= 1904 Western Conference football season =

- Sport: Football
- Number of teams: 9
- Co-champions: Minnesota, Michigan

Football seasons
- ← 1903 1905 →

1904 Western Conference football standings
	Conf.					Overall
Team	W		L		T	W		L		T
Minnesota +	3	–	0	–	0	13	–	0	–	0
Michigan +	2	–	0	–	0	10	–	0	–	0
Chicago	5	–	1	–	1	10	–	1	–	1
Illinois	3	–	1	–	1	9	–	2	–	1
Northwestern	1	–	2	–	0	8	–	2	–	0
Purdue	1	–	2	–	0	9	–	3	–	0
Iowa	0	–	3	–	0	7	–	4	–	0
Wisconsin	0	–	3	–	0	5	–	3	–	0
Indiana	0	–	3	–	0	6	–	4	–	0
+ – Conference co-champions

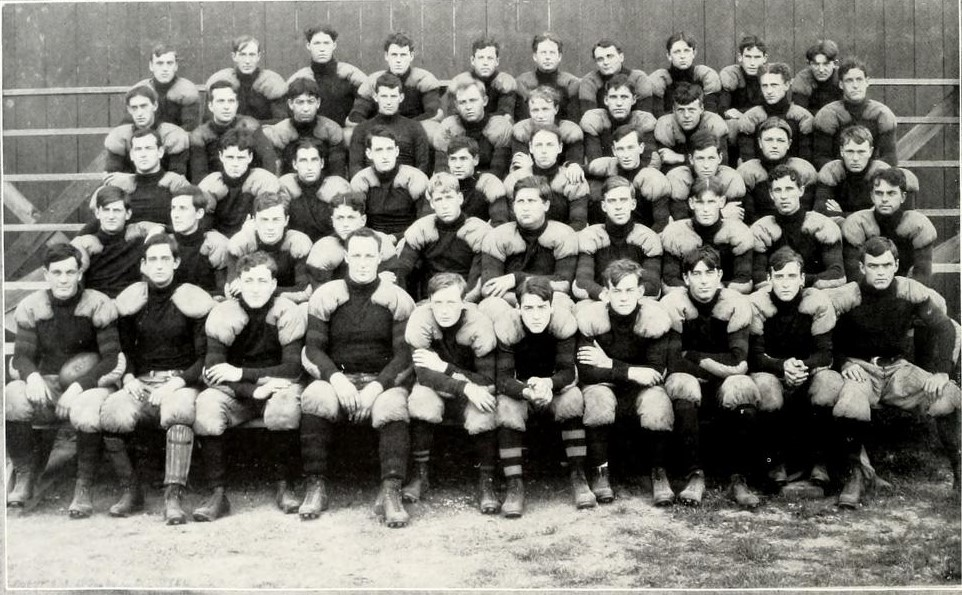
Photo of the 1904 Purdue football team

The 1904 Western Conference football season was the ninth season of college football played by the member schools of the Western Conference (later known as the Big Ten Conference) and was a part of the 1904 college football season.

== Season overview ==
=== Results and team statistics ===
Conf. Rank	Team	Head coach	Overall record	Conf. record	PPG	PAG
1 (tie)	Minnesota	Henry L. Williams	13-0	3-0	55.8	0.9
1 (tie)	Michigan	Fielding H. Yost	10–0	2–0	56.7	2.2
3	Chicago	Amos A. Stagg	10–1–1	5–1–1	34.2	3.7
4	Illinois	multiple	9–2–1	3–1–1	19.3	3.5
5 (tie)	Northwestern	Walter McCornack	8–2	1–2	31.2	5.5
5 (tie)	Purdue	Oliver Cutts	9–3	1–2	14.7	5.5
7 (tie)	Iowa	John Chalmers	7–4	0–3	22.8	9.9
7 (tie)	Wisconsin	Arthur Curtis	5–3	0–3	33.1	9.3
7 (tie)	Indiana	James H. Horne	6–4	0–3	8.4	11.6

Key

PPG = Average of points scored per game
PAG = Average of points allowed per game

=== Bowl games ===
No Western Conference schools participated in any bowl games during the 1904 season.

== Awards and honors ==
=== All-Western players ===
Eleven players were chosen as first-team players on at least four of the 1904 All-Western college football teams named by the following eight selectors: Collier's Weekly (COL), Chicago Record-Herald (CRH), Chicago Tribune (CT), Detroit Free Press (DFP), Detroit Tribune (DT), The Minneapolis Journal (MJ), The St. Louis Republic (SLR), and Walter Camp (WC) in Collier's Weekly. (Players unanimously chosen by all eight selectors are listed in bold.)

- Claude Rothgeb, end, Illinois (COL, CRH, CT, DFP, DT, SLR, WC)
- James Irving Bush, end, Wisconsin (COL, CRH, DFP, DT, MJ, WC)
- **Joe Curtis**, tackle, Michigan (COL, CRH, CT, DFP, DT, MJ, SLR, WC)
- Wilson Bertke, tackle, Wisconsin (COL, DFP, MJ, SLR, WC)
- **Walton W. Thorpe**, guard, Minnesota (COL, CRH, CT, DFP, DT, MJ, SLR, WC)
- Charles A. Fairweather, guard, Illinois (COL, CRH, CT, DFP, SLR, WC)
- John Hazelwood, center, Illinois (COL, CRH, CT, SLR)
- Walter Eckersall, Chicago (COL, CRH, CT, DFP, DT, SLR, WC)
- **Willie Heston**, halfback, Michigan (COL, CRH, CT, DFP, DT, MJ, SLR, WC)
- E. J. Vanderboom, halfback, Wisconsin (DFP, DT, SLR, WC)
- Frank Longman, fullback, Michigan (COL, CRH, DFP, DT)

=== All-Americans ===
The following three Western Conference players were consensus first-team players on the 1904 College Football All-America Team.

- Fred Speik, end, Chicago (Caspar Whitney [CW])
- Willie Heston, halfback, Michigan (Walter Camp [WC], New York Evening Telegram)
- Walter Eckersall, fullback, Chicago (CW, WC)
