= 1904 Chicago Maroons football team =

American college football season

1904 Chicago Maroons football
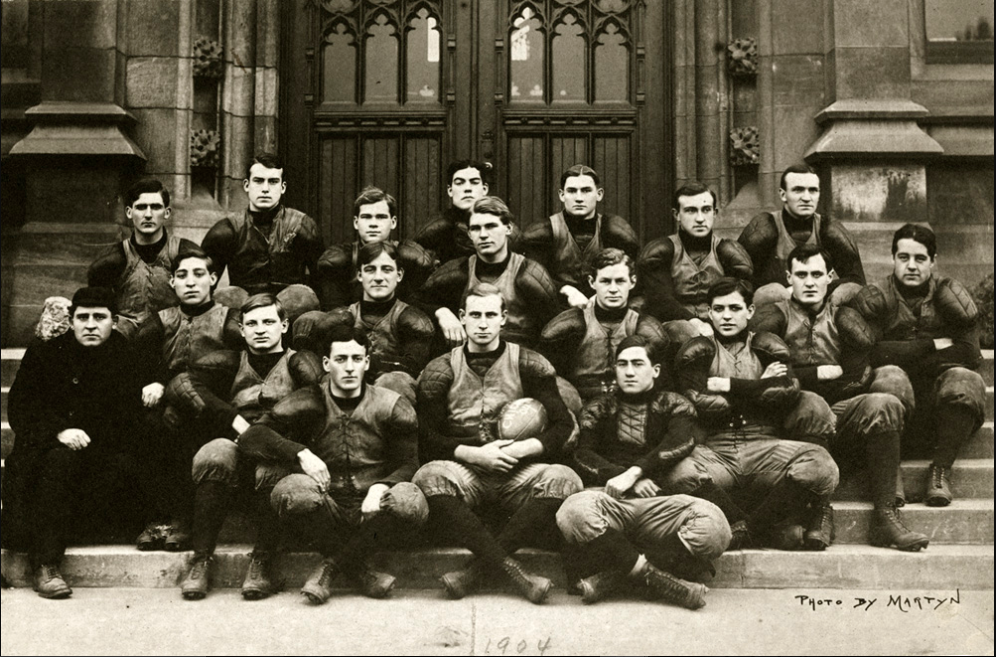
- Conference: Western Conference
- Record: 10–1–1 (5–1–1 Western)
- Head coach: Amos Alonzo Stagg (13th season)
- Captain: Frederick A. Speik
- Home stadium: Marshall Field

1904 Western Conference football standings
	Conf.					Overall
Team	W		L		T	W		L		T
Minnesota +	3	–	0	–	0	13	–	0	–	0
Michigan +	2	–	0	–	0	10	–	0	–	0
Chicago	5	–	1	–	1	10	–	1	–	1
Illinois	3	–	1	–	1	9	–	2	–	1
Northwestern	1	–	2	–	0	8	–	2	–	0
Purdue	1	–	2	–	0	9	–	3	–	0
Iowa	0	–	3	–	0	7	–	4	–	0
Wisconsin	0	–	3	–	0	5	–	3	–	0
Indiana	0	–	3	–	0	6	–	4	–	0
+ – Conference co-champions

The 1904 Chicago Maroons football team was an American football team that represented the University of Chicago as a member of the Western Conference (now commonly known as the Big Ten Conference) during the 1904 Western Conference football season. In their 13th season under head coach Amos Alonzo Stagg, the Maroons compiled a 10–1–1 record (5–1–1 in conference games), finished in third place in the conference, shut out eight opponents, and outscored all opponents by a total of 410 to 44.

The Maroons won the first eight games of the season and had convincing victories over Indiana (56–0), Iowa (39–0), Texas (68–0) and Wisconsin (18–11). The team's only setbacks were a 6–6 tie with Illinois and a 22–12 loss to national champion Michigan.

The team played its home games at Marshall Field (later renamed Stagg Field) on the school's campus in Chicago.

== Schedule ==
Date	Opponent	Site	Result	Attendance	Source
September 17	Lombard*	Marshall Field; Chicago, IL	W 40–5		
September 21	Englewood High School*	Marshall Field; Chicago, IL	W 72–0		
September 24	Lawrence*	Marshall Field; Chicago, IL	W 29–0		
September 28	North Division High School*	Marshall Field; Chicago, IL	W 18–0		
October 1	Indiana	Marshall Field; Chicago, IL	W 56–0		
October 8	Purdue	Marshall Field; Chicago, IL (rivalry)	W 20–0	4,000	
October 15	Iowa	Marshall Field; Chicago, IL	W 39–0		
October 22	Northwestern	Marshall Field; Chicago, IL	W 32–0	15,000	
October 29	Illinois	Marshall Field; Chicago, IL	T 6–6		
November 5	Texas*	Marshall Field; Chicago, IL	W 68–0		
November 12	at Michigan	Regents Field; Ann Arbor, MI (rivalry)	L 12–22	13,000	
November 24	Wisconsin	Marshall Field; Chicago, IL	W 18–11	15,000	
*Non-conference game

== Roster ==
Player	Position	Weight
Frederick A. Speik (captain)	left end	176
Benjamin Harrison Badenoch	right guard	188
Hugo Bezdek	fullback	175
William James Boone	right tackle	182
Mark Catlin Sr.	right halfback	181
Leo DeTray	left halfback	172
Walter Eckersall	quarterback	140
Burton Pike Gale	center	185
Melville Archibald Hill	left tackle, center	205
Carl Huntley Hitchcock	left halfback	157
Charles Ferguson Kennedy	right end	150
Lee Wilder Maxwell	quarterback, right end	156
Fred William Noll	left guard	205
Ed Parry	left tackle	202
William Charles Speidel	right halfback	175
Schuyler Baldwin Terry	right guard	197
John F. Tobin	left guard, right tackle	192
Mysterious Walker	fullback	170
Lester Larson	substitute	164
Wayland Wells Magee	substitute	161
Clarence W. Russell	substitute	182
George Varnell	substitute	158
Charles Francis Watson	substitute	176
Max Yates	substitute	163
Hiram Conibear	trainer

- Head coach: Amos Alonzo Stagg (13th year at Chicago)

== Honors and awards ==
End Frederick A. Speik was selected as the team captain in January 1904.

Quarterback Walter Eckersall was selected by both Walter Camp and Caspar Whitney as a first-team player on the 1964 All-America college football team. Speik also received first-team All-America honors from Whitney.

Six Chicago players received first-team honors on the 1904 All-Western college football team: Eckersall (eight selectors); tackle Ed Parry (three selectors); Speik (two selectors); fullback Hugo Bezdek (two selectors); halfback Mark Catlin Sr. (one selector); and end Charles Kennedy (one selector).
