= 1904 Minnesota Golden Gophers football team =

American college football season

1904 Minnesota Golden Gophers football
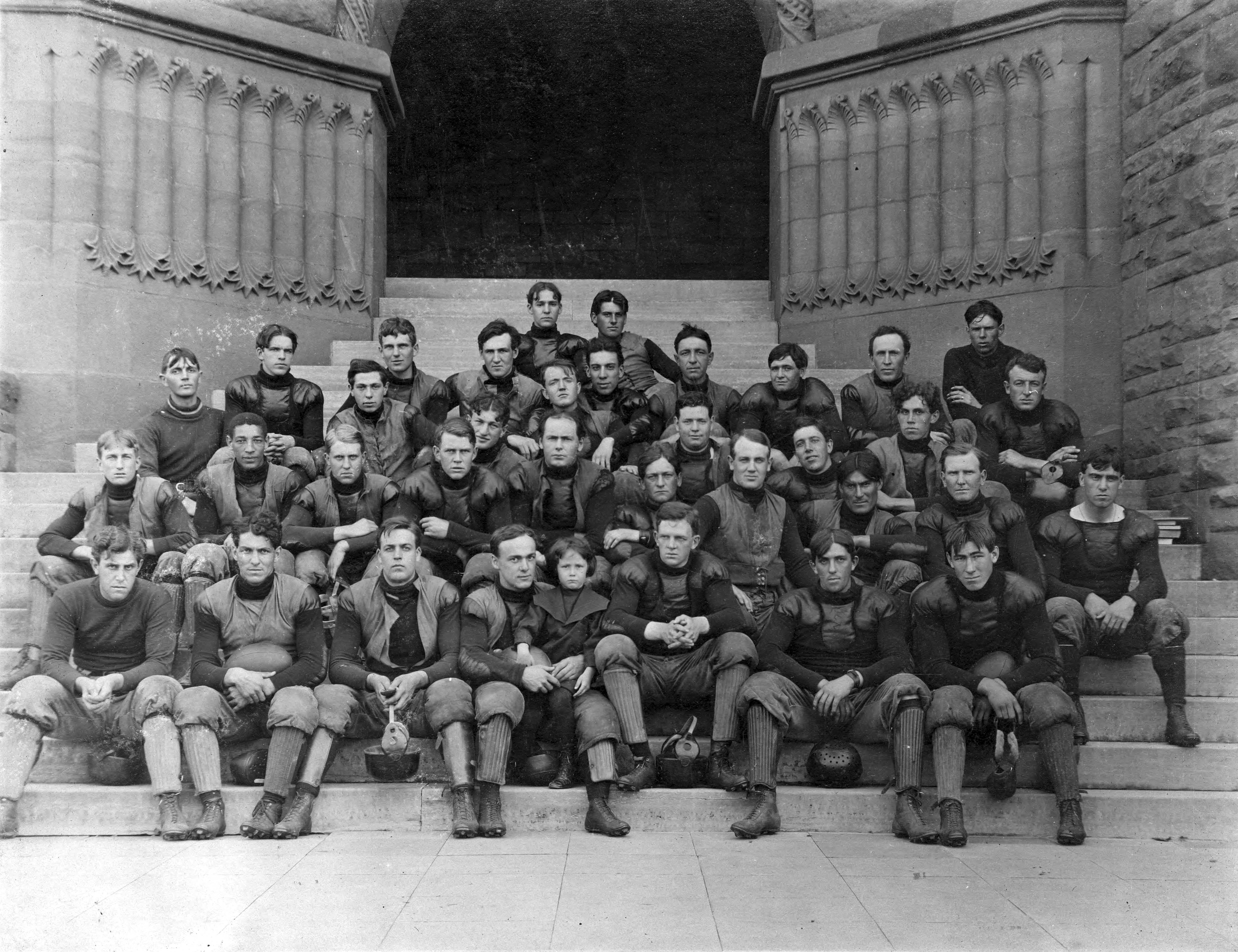

National champion (Billingsley) Western Conference co-champion
- Conference: Western Conference
- Record: 13–0 (3–0 Western)
- Head coach: Henry L. Williams (5th season)
- Base defense: 7–1–2–1
- Captain: Mose Strathern
- Home stadium: Northrop Field

1904 Western Conference football standings
	Conf.					Overall
Team	W		L		T	W		L		T
Minnesota +	3	–	0	–	0	13	–	0	–	0
Michigan +	2	–	0	–	0	10	–	0	–	0
Chicago	5	–	1	–	1	10	–	1	–	1
Illinois	3	–	1	–	1	9	–	2	–	1
Northwestern	1	–	2	–	0	8	–	2	–	0
Purdue	1	–	2	–	0	9	–	3	–	0
Iowa	0	–	3	–	0	7	–	4	–	0
Wisconsin	0	–	3	–	0	5	–	3	–	0
Indiana	0	–	3	–	0	6	–	4	–	0
+ – Conference co-champions

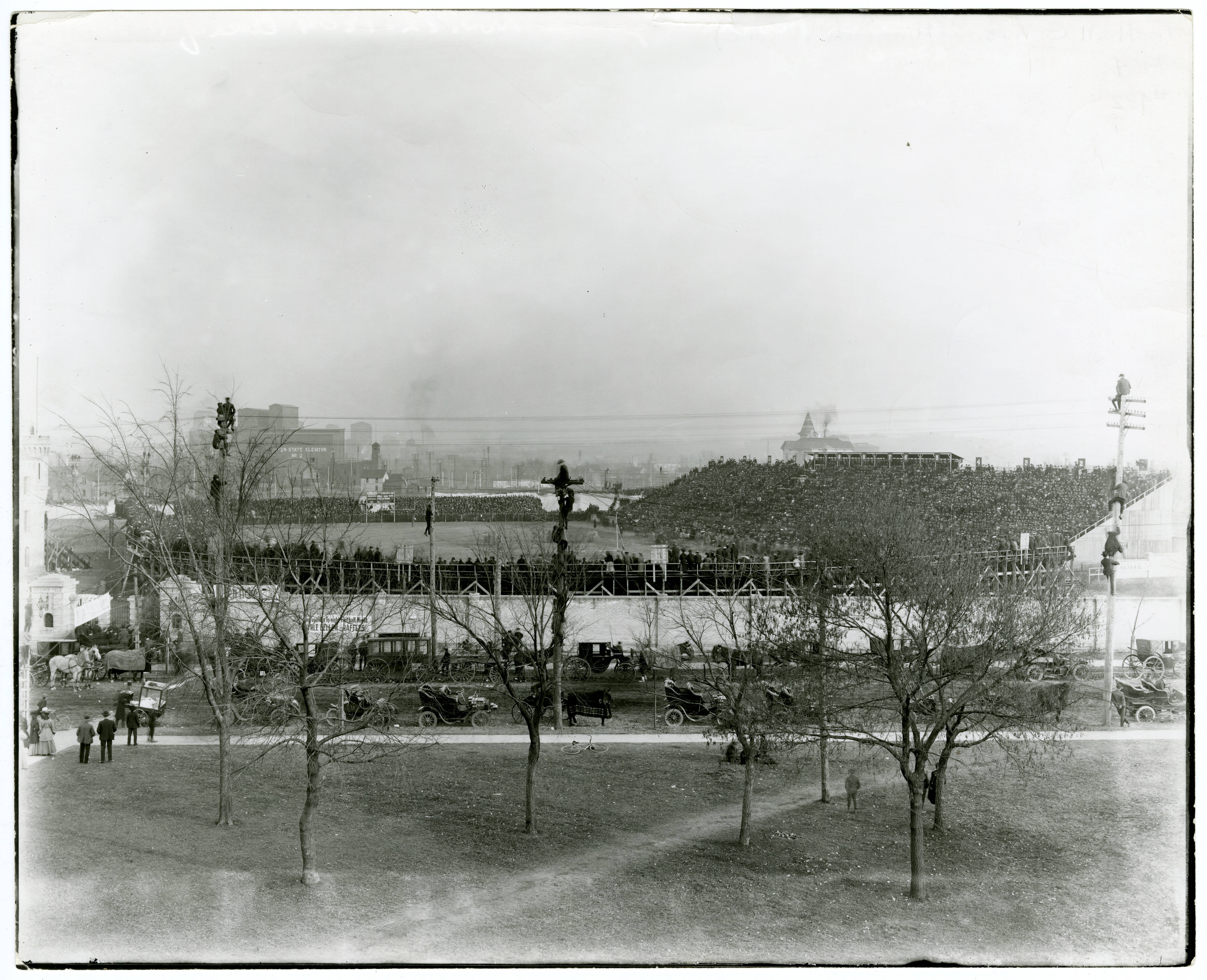
Football Game, Wisconsin versus Minnesota at Northrop Field, November 12, 1904

The 1904 Minnesota Golden Gophers football team represented the University of Minnesota in the 1904 Western Conference football season. In their fifth year under head coach Henry L. Williams, the Golden Gophers compiled a 13–0 record (3–0 against Western Conference opponents). The 1904 Minnesota team has been recognized as a college football national champion by the Billingsley Report.

The 146 point victory over Grinnell represents both the largest point total and the largest margin of victory in Gopher football history.

Ten Minnesota players were recognized on the 1904 All-Western college football team: quarterback Sigmund Harris (COL-2, CT-2, MJ-1); halfbacks Otto Nelson Davies (COL-1, CT-2, MJ-1) and James Edward Kremer (COL-2); fullback Earl Current (CT-2, MJ-1); end Bobby Marshall (COL-2, MJ-1); tackles Percy Porter Brush (CRH, CT-2, MJ-2) and George Leland Case (MJ-2); guards Walton W. Thorpe (COL-1, CRH, CT-1, DFP, DT, MJ-1, SLR, WC) and Daniel D. Smith, Minnesota (CT-2); and center Moses Strathern (MJ-1).

Two players also received recognition on the 1904 College Football All-America Team. Quarterback Sigmund Harris received third-team honors from Walter Camp, and guard Walton Thorp received first-team honors from Illinois coach Fred Lowenthal and third-team honors from Walter Camp.

Notably, Minnesota did not play undefeated Michigan in 1904, despite the teams being members of the Western Conference. Both teams received acclaim as national champion for the 1904 season.

== Schedule ==
Date	Opponent	Site	Result	Attendance	Source
September 17	Twin Cities Central High*	Northrop Field; Minneapolis, MN	W 107–0	3,000	
September 24	South Dakota*	Northrop Field; Minneapolis, MN	W 77–0		
September 28	Shattuck*	Northrop Field; Minneapolis, MN	W 75–0		
October 1	Carleton*	Northrop Field; Minneapolis, MN	W 65–0		
October 5	St. Thomas (MN)*	Northrop Field; Minneapolis, MN	W 47–0		
October 8	North Dakota*	Northrop Field; Minneapolis, MN	W 35–0	2,000	
October 15	Iowa State*	Northrop Field; Minneapolis, MN	W 32–0		
October 22	Grinnell*	Northrop Field; Minneapolis, MN	W 146–0		
October 29	Nebraska*	Northrop Field; Minneapolis, MN (rivalry)	W 16–12	12,000	
November 5	Lawrence*	Northrop Field; Minneapolis, MN	W 69–0		
November 12	Wisconsin	Northrop Field; Minneapolis, MN (rivalry)	W 28–0	18,000	
November 19	vs. Northwestern	Marshall Field; Chicago, IL	W 17–0	11,000	
November 24	vs. Iowa	Cedar Rapids, IA (rivalry)	W 11–0		
*Non-conference game
