= Walter Rheinschild =

American football player and coach (1884–1960)

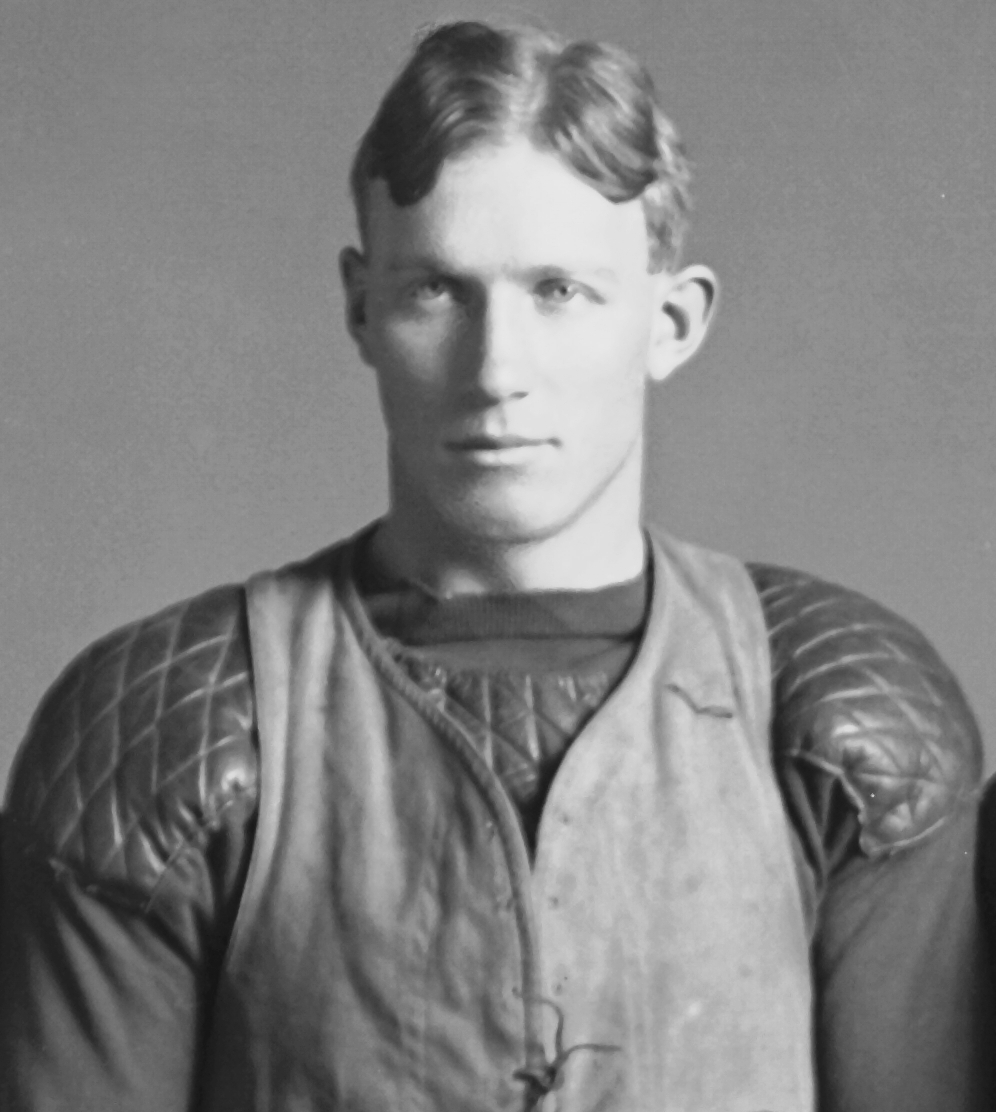

Biographical details
- Born: September 26, 1884; Lawrence, Kansas, U.S.
- Died: October 3, 1960 (aged 76); Los Angeles, California, U.S.

Playing career
- 1904–1905, 1907: Michigan
- Positions: Tackle, fullback

Coaching career (HC unless noted)
- 1908: Washington State
- 1909: St. Vincent's (CA)
- 1913: Throop
- 1917: Occidental

Head coaching record
- Overall: 15–4–2

Accomplishments and honors

Championships
- National (1904)

Awards
- First-team All-Western (1907)

Walter Meadowfield Rheinschild (September 26, 1884 – October 3, 1960), known also by the nicknames "Rheiny" and "Rhino", was an American football player and coach. He played for the University of Michigan in 1904, 1905, and 1907, and was once "rated as the highest salaried amateur athlete in the business." He later coached for Washington State University in 1908, St. Vincent's College (now known as Loyola Marymount University) in 1909, Throop College (now known as California Institute of Technology) in 1913, and Occidental College in 1917.

== Biography ==
=== Early years ===
Rheinschild was born in Lawrence, Kansas in 1884 and raised in Los Angeles, California. In the 1890s, Rheinschild began playing football for the Boyle Heights Stars in the Boyle Heights section of Los Angeles. With Rheinschild playing fullback, the Stars won what the Los Angeles Times called "the 'scrub' championship of this city."

In 1900, Rheinschild enrolled at Los Angeles High School, where he became "a gridiron hero." In 1901, he played tackle for the Los Angeles High School football team that tied Belmont High School for the state championship and defeated several college teams, including the University of Southern California (28–0), Pomona College (30–0), Occidental College (32–0), and St. Vincent's College (95–0). In 1902, the powerful Los Angeles High School team again defeated college teams, including USC, Occidental, Pomona and Throop College (now known as California Institute of Technology). In his senior year in 1903, Rheinschild led Los Angeles High School to the California state championship, culminating in an 11–0 victory over Berkeley High School in the championship game.

Rheinschild also organized the first track team at Los Angeles High School and was elected as the first captain of the track team.

=== Bidding for Rheinschild's services ===
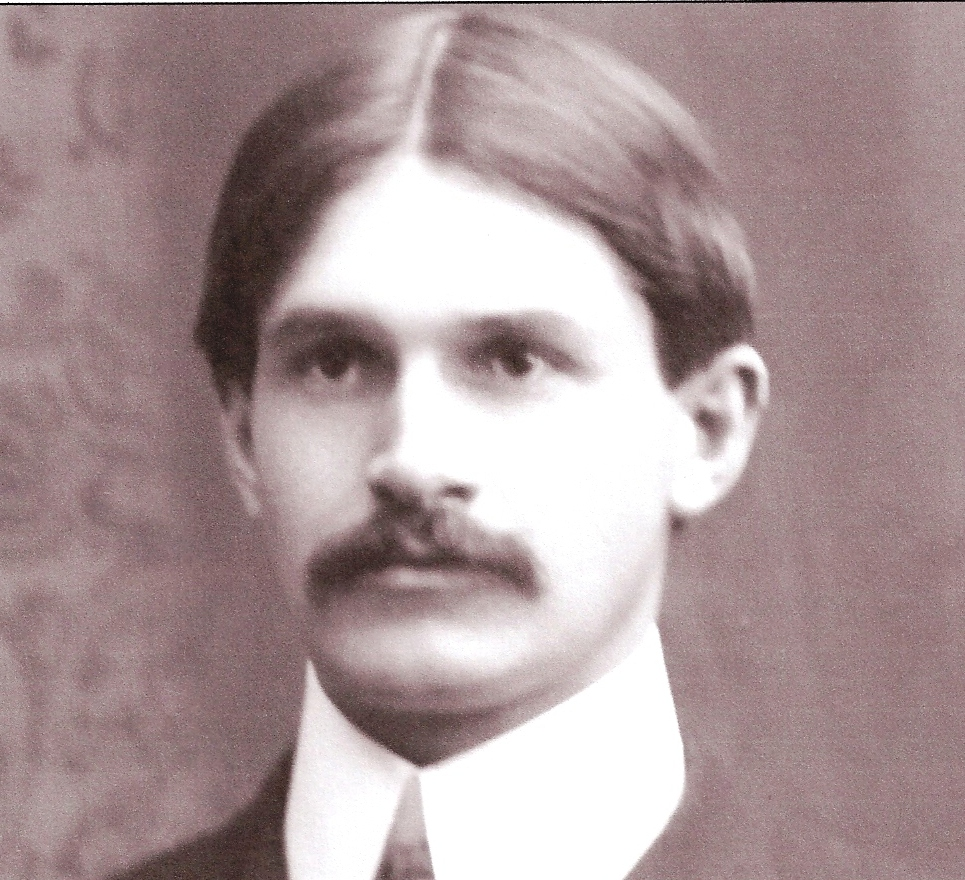
Rheinschild and Michigan athletic director Charles A. Baird (pictured) denied that any money was paid to Rheinschild for playing football.

Rheinschild was one of the most heavily recruited high school football players in the United States in 1904. USC coach Harvey Holmes recruited him strenuously, and Rheinschild later said that Holmes had offered him $75 a month for his services. At the time, USC was not a major football program, and Rheinschild reportedly wanted "nothing but the big league stuff." The University of Wisconsin made an offer to Rheinschild which he said was $25 higher than USC had offered. Rheinschild recalled, "Twelve hundred looked big to me, but I wanted a winner. Wisconsin had been a joke for many seasons and I couldn't see it." A former coach at Los Angeles High School, Shorty Roach, was a friend of Michigan coach Fielding H. Yost and a Michigan scout on the side. Roach encouraged Rheinschild to consider Michigan, which had not lost a game since 1900. A Wisconsin newspaper described the bidding contest between the University of Wisconsin and the University of Michigan for his services:

Walter Rheinschild, one of the best academic foot ball players in Southern California, is the object of spirited bidding by foot ball managers at Wisconsin and Michigan universities. Rheinschild was a star tackle on last year's local high school team. He weighs 190 pounds. He declares openly that Manager Baird of Michigan offered to pay all his expenses during the season and finally offered him remunerative employment. Wisconsin, he says, offered him all traveling expenses and $60 a month for two hours work a day at the state capital. Rheinschild leaves tomorrow for the east. If Michigan equals Wisconsin's offer he will go to Ann Arbor, if not, to Madison. At Kansas City he expects to receive Baird's highest offer.

Rheinschild was also visited by "a delegation" from Dartmouth College seeking "to do business with the California lad." Rheinschild later told the Los Angeles Times that Dartmouth had offered him $2,200 for a year's work on the football team. Rheinschild settled on Fielding Yost's team at Michigan and later told the Times that "he swears by all that is swearable that he never received a cent from his Alma Mater for his athletic contributions." Michigan's athletic director Charles A. Baird also denied making any offers of financial assistance to Rheinschild. However, when he rejected Dartmouth's offer of $2,200, eastern newspapers insinuated that Rheinschild had signed for "a Ty Cobb salary at Ann Arbor." It was rumored that Rheinschild was receiving as much as $50,000 a year at Michigan, which if true would be as much as the U.S. president at the time.

In a feature story on Rheinschild, the Los Angeles Times in 1914 summed up the bidding war for Rheinschild this way:

He used to be the great 'Rhiney,' and was known from coast to coast as one of the most eminent gridiron warriors ever enticed under the Michigan colors. At one time, 'Rhiney' was rated as the highest salaried amateur athlete in the business, and he had standing offers from a number of those colleges where football reigns, of sweet sums for his services.

=== University of Michigan ===
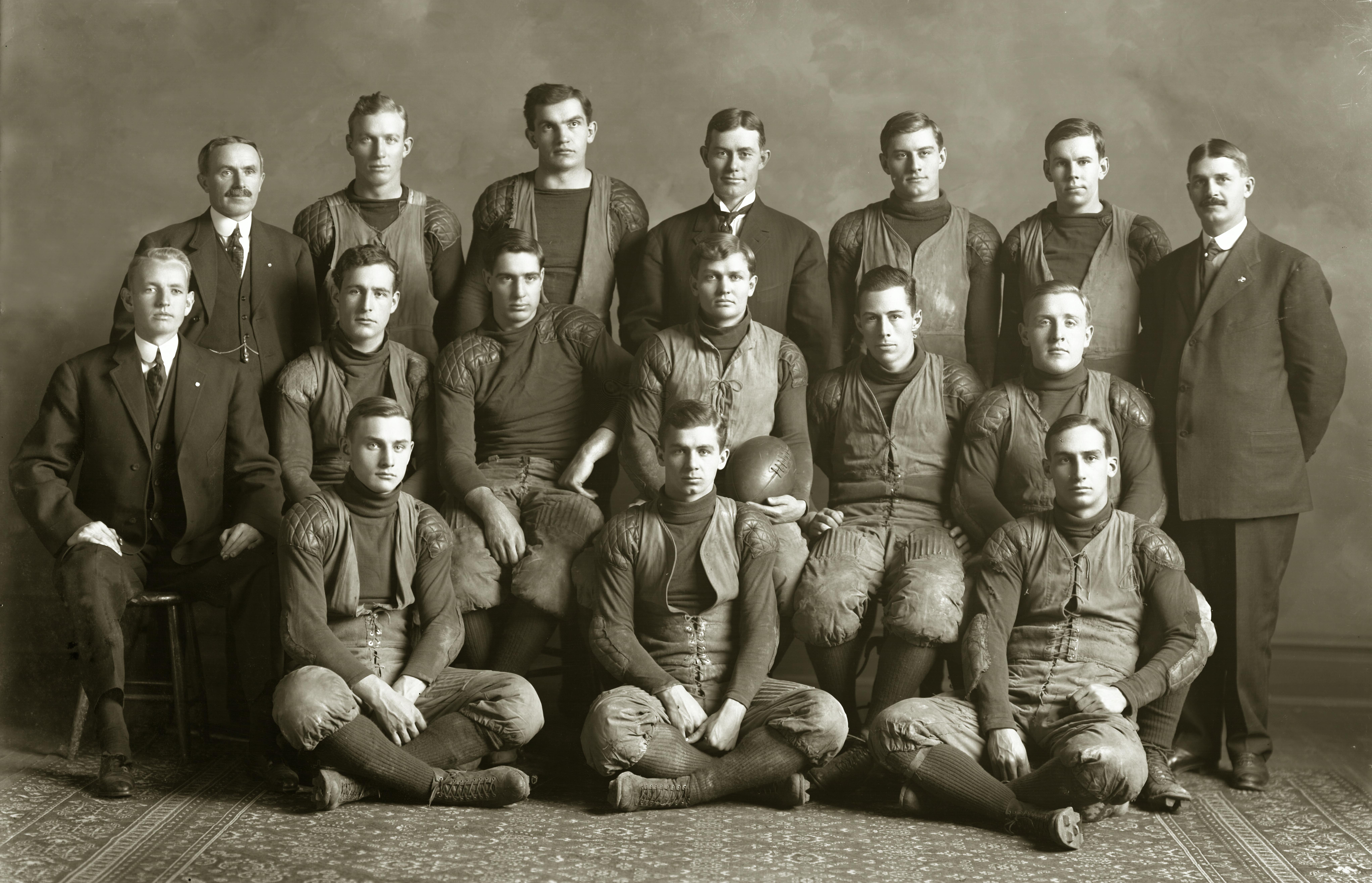
Official portrait of the 1907 Michigan football team—Rheinschild is second from the left in the back row.

Rheinschild enrolled at the University of Michigan in 1904 and played for Fielding H. Yost's Michigan Wolverines football teams of 1904, 1905, and 1907. Rheinschild also threw the shot put for the Michigan Wolverines men's track and field team alongside world record holder Ralph Rose, and played catcher on the Michigan Wolverines baseball team.

When Rheinschild established himself as a starter for Michigan in 1905, the Los Angeles Herald reported on his success as follows:

Walter Reinschild, formerly a star player of the Los Angeles high school football team, is making good with the University of Michigan squad this year. He played right tackle in the game against Vanderbilt university last Saturday and made consistent gains when given the ball. According to reports of the game Reinschild hit the opposing line low and hard and his work was a factor in winning a decisive victory for 'Hurry Up' Yost's team. It looks as though Reinschild would be a fixture on the team.

In late 1905 and early 1906, charges of professionalism were leveled at the major college football programs, including Michigan, leading to calls for reform or even elimination of the sport from college campuses. In response to the controversy, the faculty at Michigan ruled Rheinschild and two other football players, Germany Schulz and Henry Schulte, academically ineligible. As a result, Rheinschild missed the 1906 season. Rheinschild's hometown newspaper, the Los Angeles Times described the action as follows: "In 1906 a wave of athletic purity swept over the country and the faculty refused to allow Rheinschild to play, for appearance sake. ... 'Rhiney' assisted Yost with the coaching and did some classroom work for a change."

Rheinschild returned to the football team in 1907. Playing at tackle and occasionally at fullback, he scored three touchdowns in Michigan's victory over Michigan Agricultural College (now known as Michigan State University) in October 1907. He also scored touchdowns against Wabash College and Ohio State in 1907. At the end of the 1907 season, Rheinschild was one of two Michigan players selected by Fielding H. Yost for the All-American team he selected for the North American Press Syndicate. He was also selected as an All-Western tackle by Walter Eckersall, who wrote that Rheinschild "has no equal at tackle." Eckersall continued:

Rheinschild of Michigan played close to the top this year, and his work in the Pennsylvania game would have given him even without his work in the other games. It was the best of any tackle on the field, and clearly indicated his caliber. One of his points is getting down the field under kicks. He often beat his ends down, and was sure and deadly in his tackle. He was not made use of sufficiently in offense to get his value in that respect. He was able to lunge from his position with extreme rapidity, to assist either the offense or defense. His play was, if anything less showy than in former years, but fully as effective, and this was clearly demonstrated all year.

Rheinschild graduated from the University of Michigan in 1908 with a law degree.

=== Coaching career ===
After receiving his law degree, Rheinschild went to London where he competed for the Illinois Athletic Club in the 1908 Summer Olympics. After the Olympics, Rheinschild traveled to Paris, where he claimed to have "taught the 'frog-eaters' how to box for a few months." Upon returning to the United States, he got a job "escorting a flock of prisoners across the continent to Mare Island" in Northern California.

In the fall of 1908, Rheinschild served as head football coach for the Washington State University Cougars in Pullman, Washington. In his first and only season as coach at Washington State, his football team compiled a record of 4 wins, 0 losses, and 2 ties. When the University of Washington claimed to be the football champions of the Northwest, Rheinschild, whose team played Washington to a tie, disputed the claim and challenged them to a rematch in Pullman. Rheinschild added, "Can Washington lay claim to the championship over W.S.C. when we played them to a standstill on their own grounds, held them to a 6 to 6 score and were outplaying them in the last 10 minutes of the game, so that nothing but the expiration of time prevented us from scoring a touchdown?"

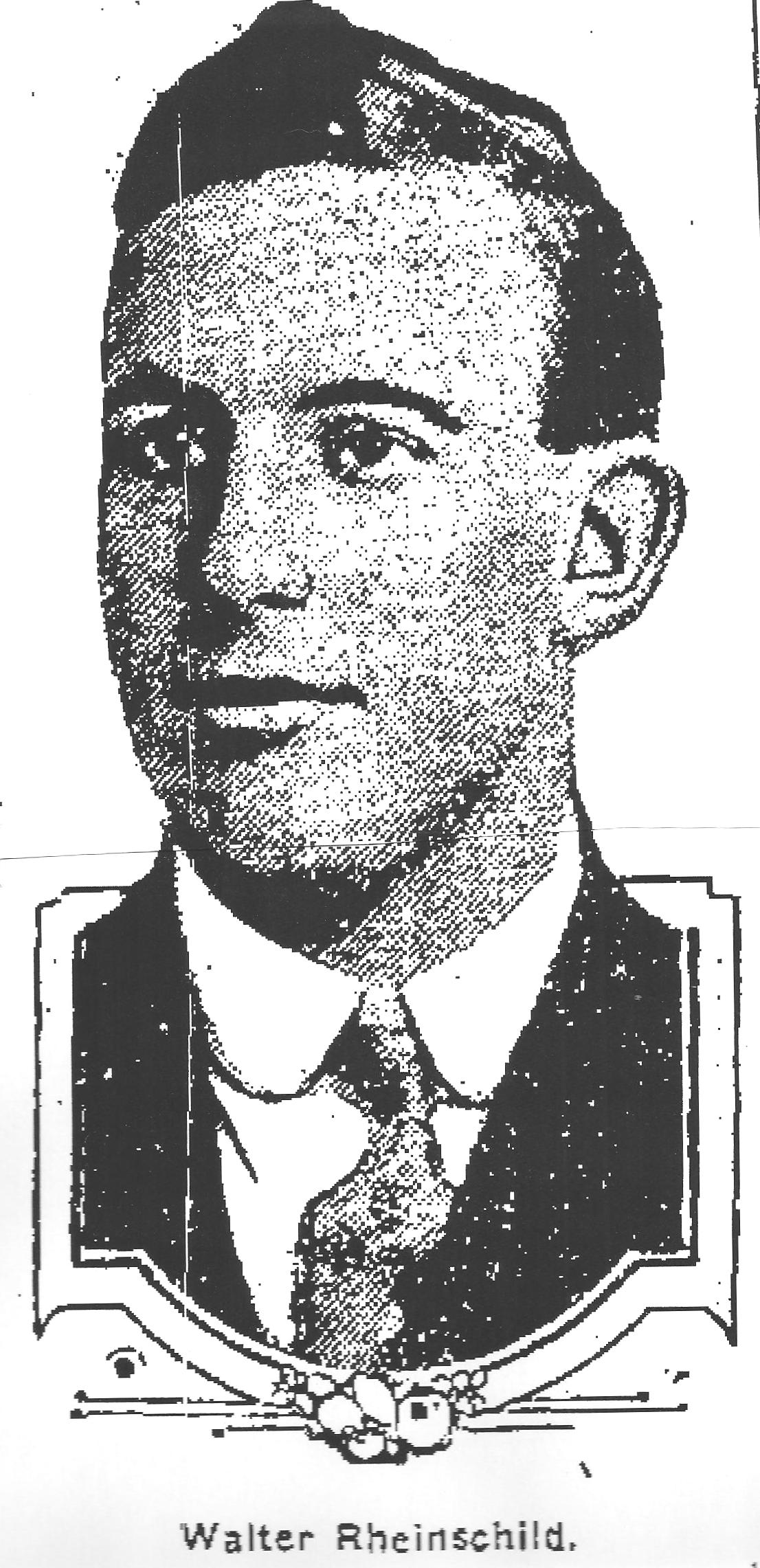
Image of Rheinschild from 1909 newspaper article announcing his hiring by St. Vincent's College

In 1909, Rheinschild returned to Los Angeles to become head football coach at St. Vincent's College (now known as Loyola Marymount University). He led St. Vincent's to an undefeated season and the football championship of Southern California in his one year as head coach. The Los Angeles Times praised Rheinschild's efforts in turning the St. Vincent's team into champions:

Rheinschild has accomplished wonders with a squad which at the outset of the season appeared to be mediocre to an unusual degree. The Saints' athletic authorities are more than pleased with the success of 'Rheiny.' They expected the coach to clean up the Saint athletics and get a start for next year. 'Rheiny' did considerably more. He developed the strongest team the Saints ever had. And the eleven played clean ball too.

In 1910, St. Vincent's College withdrew from participation in Southern California intercollegiate athletics, opting to confine athletics to the Catholic student body.

In 1913, Rheinschild was hired as the football coach at Throop College (now known as California Institute of Technology) in Pasadena, California, where he was paid $40 per game—the largest salary ever paid to a football coach in Southern California. He continued coaching in the 1910s as the football coach of the Los Angeles Athletic Club.

In 1915, Rheinschild was offered coaching positions at both the University of Michigan and the University of Washington. In April 1916 Rheinschild was endorsed to serve as the football coach at Occidental College, replacing Joseph Pipal. Occidental football records show that Fox Stanton served as the team's head coach in 1916. Rheinschild coached at Occidental during the 1917 season.

On Christmas Day 1917, Rheinschild coached and played for a college all-star football team in a match against athletes from the San Pedro Submarine Base.

=== Family, legal and business careers ===
Rheinschild was married in February 1909 to Enid Daniels at the Scottish Rite Cathedral in Los Angeles; following the ceremony, they couple was given a box at the Orpheum Theatre where a spot light was thrown on them between acts as "the orchestra struck up a wedding march" for the embarrassed couple.

After stepping down as the coach at St. Vincent's College in 1910, Rheinschild established a law practice in the Security Building, then the tallest building in Los Angeles, located in the heart of the city's Spring Street Financial District. He continued with his legal practice between and after his stints as a football coach.

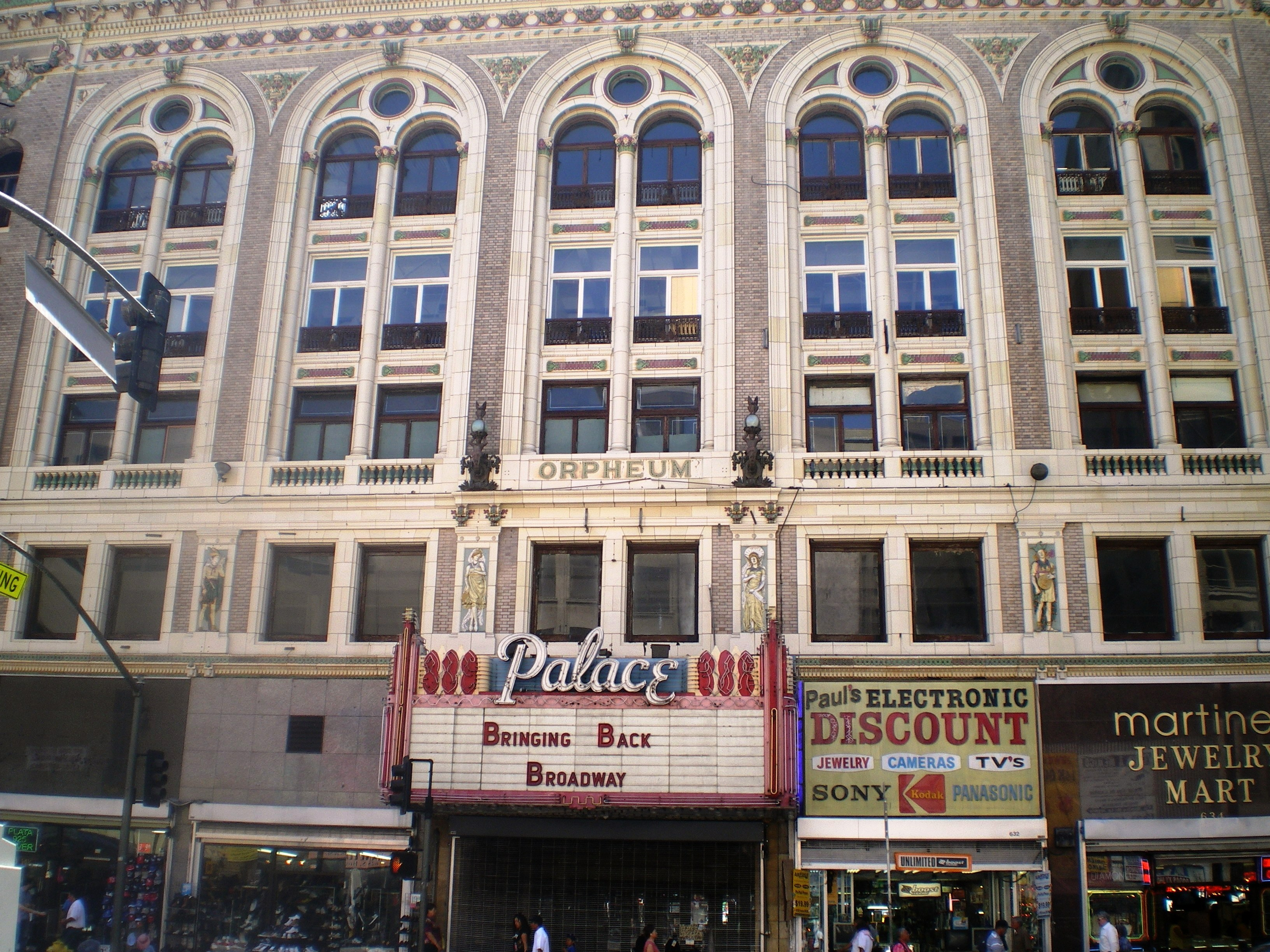
The old "Orpheum Theater" where Rheinschild and his bride were in the spotlight in 1909.

In April 1919, Rheinschild was tried and found not guilty of complicity in an automobile theft; Rheinschild had been accused of hiding the automobile after it was stolen by another person. In September 1919, Rheinschild was suspended from the practice of law for 18 months after being accused of unethical conduct in representing both parties in a loan transaction. The Los Angeles Times reported that "tears of mortification" came into his eyes when the suspension was announced, and "his young and attractive wife ran up to him and threw her arms around his neck and tenderly kissed him." Two weeks later, the same judge reversed the suspension. The following month, a different judge ordered Rheinschild disbarred, stating that the action was needed to set an example for other lawyers to restrain from similar conflicts of interest.

As of 1934, Rheinschild was the president of Corona Oil Company, Ltd., which was then drilling for oil in "the old Rancho LaSierra" in Riverside County, California.

In 1942, Rheinschild was a prosecution witness against Bugsy Siegel on charges of murdering Harry "Big Greenie" Greenberg; Rheinschild testified he had seen Siegel near Greenberg's house on many occasions in the weeks prior to the murder.

== Head coaching record ==
Year	Team	Overall	Conference	Standing	Bowl/playoffs
Washington State (Northwest Conference) (1908)
1908	Washington State	4–0–2	1–0–2	2nd	
Washington State:		4–0–2	1–0–2		
St. Vincent's Saints (Independent) (1909)
1909	St. Vincent's	6–0			
St. Vincent's:		6–0			
Throop (Independent) (1913)
1913	Throop	0–2			
Throop:		0–2			
Occidental Tigers (Southern California Conference) (1917)
1917	Occidental	5–2	3–1	2nd	
Occidental:		5–2	3–1		
Total:		15–4–2			
