= 1904 Case football team =

American college football season

1904 Case football
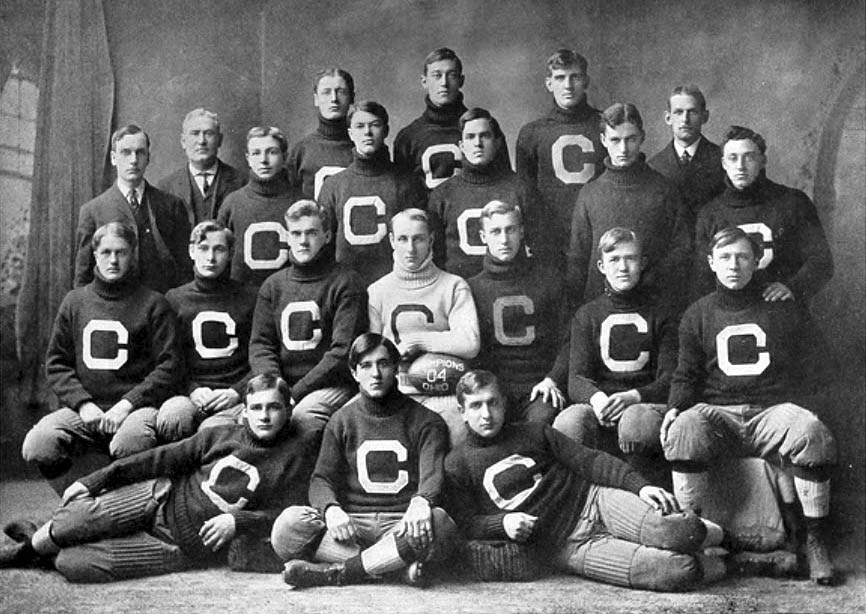

OAC champion
- Conference: Ohio Athletic Conference
- Record: 7–2 (4–1 OAC)
- Head coach: Joseph Wentworth (3rd season)
- Captain: Chester Orr

1904 Ohio Athletic Conference football standings
	Conf.					Overall
Team	W		L		T	W		L		T
Case $	4	–	1	–	0	7	–	2	–	0
Ohio State	2	–	1	–	0	6	–	5	–	0
Oberlin	2	–	2	–	1	4	–	2	–	1
Western Reserve	1	–	1	–	1	4	–	2	–	3
Ohio Wesleyan	2	–	2	–	0	5	–	5	–	0
Kenyon	0	–	4	–	0	3	–	5	–	1
$ – Conference champion

The 1904 Case football team represented the Case School of Applied Science, now a part of Case Western Reserve University, during the 1904 college football season. The team's head coach was Joseph Wentworth. Case won its third consecutive Ohio Athletic Conference title.

== Schedule ==
Date	Opponent	Site	Result
October 1	at Michigan*	Regents Field; Ann Arbor, MI	L 0–33
October 8	Kenyon	Van Horn Field; Cleveland, OH	W 6–0
October 18	Wooster*	Van Horn Field; Cleveland, OH	W 22–0
October 22	at Ohio State	Ohio Field; Columbus, OH	L 6–16
October 29	Oberlin	Van Horn Field; Cleveland OH	W 16–0
November 5	Ohio Medical*	Van Horn Field; Cleveland, OH	W 21–0
November 15	at Ohio Wesleyan	Delaware, OH	W 38–6
November 19	at Allegheny*	Meadville, PA	W 29–4
November 24	Western Reserve	Van Horn Field; Cleveland, OH	W 22–0
*Non-conference game
