= 1904 Ohio State Buckeyes football team =

American college football season

1904 Ohio State Buckeyes football
- Conference: Ohio Athletic Conference
- Record: 6–5 (2–1 OAC)
- Head coach: Edwin Sweetland (1st season)
- Home stadium: Ohio Field

1904 Ohio Athletic Conference football standings
	Conf.					Overall
Team	W		L		T	W		L		T
Case $	4	–	1	–	0	7	–	2	–	0
Ohio State	2	–	1	–	0	6	–	5	–	0
Oberlin	2	–	2	–	1	4	–	2	–	1
Western Reserve	1	–	1	–	1	4	–	2	–	3
Ohio Wesleyan	2	–	2	–	0	5	–	5	–	0
Kenyon	0	–	4	–	0	3	–	5	–	1
$ – Conference champion

The 1904 Ohio State Buckeyes football team represented the Ohio State University in the 1904 college football season. The team was led by first-year head coach Edwin Sweetland and played their home games at Ohio Field. It finished the season with a 6–5 record overall and a 2–1 record in Ohio Athletic Conference play.

== Schedule ==
Date	Opponent	Site	Result	Attendance	Source
September 24	Otterbein*	Ohio Field; Columbus, OH	W 34–0		
October 1	Miami (OH)*	Ohio Field; Columbus, OH	W 80–0		
October 5	Muskingum*	Ohio Field; Columbus, OH	W 47–0		
October 8	Denison*	Ohio Field; Columbus, OH	W 24–0	2000	
October 15	Michigan*	Ohio Field; Columbus, OH (rivalry)	L 6–31	10,000	
October 22	Case	Ohio Field; Columbus, OH	W 16–6		
October 29	at Indiana*	Jordan Field; Bloomington, IN	L 0–8		
November 5	Illinois*	Ohio Field; Columbus, OH (rivalry)	L 0–46		
November 12	at Oberlin	Oberlin, OH	L 2–4		
November 19	Kenyon	Ohio Field; Columbus, OH	W 11–5		
November 24	Carlisle*	Ohio Field; Columbus, OH	L 0–23	6000	
*Non-conference game
