= Frank Longman =

American football player and coach (1882–1928)

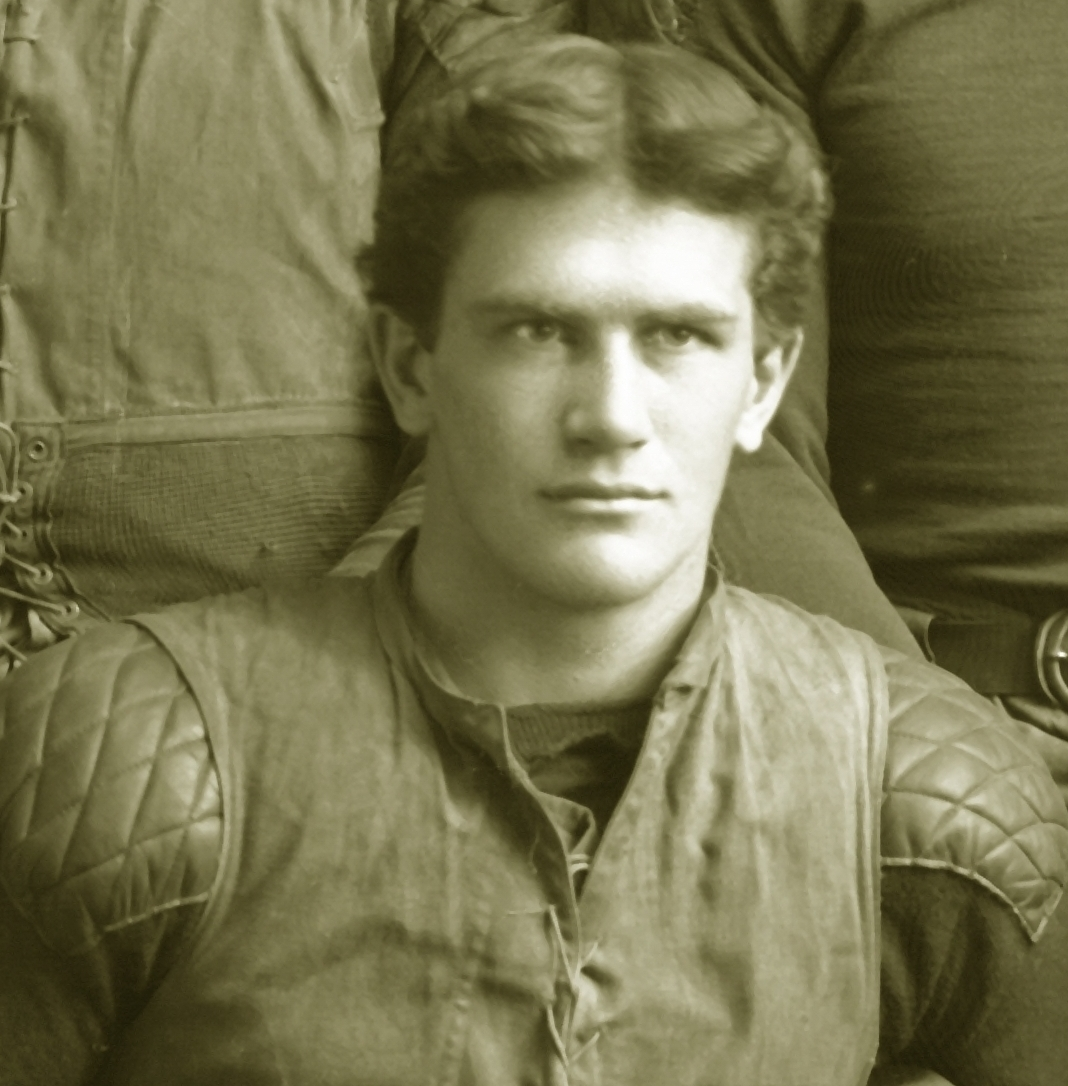
- Longman cropped from 1903 Michigan Wolverines team photograph

Biographical details
- Born: December 7, 1882; Fulton, Michigan, U.S.
- Died: April 2, 1928 (aged 45); Ann Arbor, Michigan, U.S.

Playing career
- 1903–1905: Michigan
- Position: Fullback

Coaching career (HC unless noted)
- 1906–1907: Arkansas
- 1908: Wooster
- 1909–1910: Notre Dame

Head coaching record
- Overall: 19–14–5

Accomplishments and honors

Championships
- 2× National (1903, 1904)

Awards
- First-team All-Western (1904)

Frank Chandler "Shorty" Longman (December 7, 1882 – April 4, 1928) was an American college football player and coach. He was born Dec. 7, 1882 in Fulton, a small community in rural Kalamazoo County, Michigan. By 1894, the Longman family had moved to Kalamazoo, and Chandler attended and played on the football team at Kalamazoo High School (later known as Kalamazoo Central High School). He was a member of the June 1902 Kalamazoo High School graduating class, according to an article in the June 19, 1902 Kalamazoo Telegraph.

Longman played college football at the University of Michigan from 1903 to 1905, where he was a star fullback. He later served as the head football coach at the University of Arkansas (1906–1907), and the University of Notre Dame (1909–1910).

Longman was one of the stars of Fielding H. Yost's "Point-a-Minute" teams at the University of Michigan in 1903, 1904, and 1905. In December 1904, the Chicago Daily Tribune wrote: "Longman hits the line like a stone shot from a catapult." University of Chicago star, Walter Eckersall, later wrote of Longman:

Outside of Billy Heston and Tom Hammond, Longman was the most respected player on the Wolverine elevens of those years. He was a great line plunger, had an uncanny knack of holding his feet, and when Heston and Hammond buckled on to him to drive him through a line he was hard to stop. ... Aside from being a wonderful ball carrier, Longman was a splendid blocker and it was his perfect taking off of tacklers which made numbers of Heston's runs possible.

From 1906 to 1907, he served as the head football coach at the University of Arkansas, where he compiled a 5–8–3 record. He then coached for one season at the College of Wooster in 1908. From 1909 to 1910, he coached at Notre Dame, where his teams went 11–1–2.

Longman coached the first Notre Dame team to beat the University of Michigan on the gridiron, beating the squad led by Yost, his former coach, 11-3 on Nov. 6, 1909.

Knute Rockne, who went on to become a Notre Dame football star and later a legendary coach of the Fighting Irish, played as a freshman on Longman's 1910 team.

In December 1910, Longman sold a photographic business and opened a new business in Ann Arbor, Michigan as a manufacturer of flashlight powders. In August 1911, Longman resigned as the coach at Notre Dame. At the time, The Indianapolis Star wrote:

Shorty Longman, former Michigan star full back, all-American choice, and one of the finest players that ever donned the moleskins, has forsaken football. For the last few years his work with the Notre Dame University eleven has been little short of phenomenal, and under his tutelage and care the Catholics last season won the Western championship and, land a good hold on the Eastern championship, as much as it is possible for any Western team to do. All Notre Dame will mourn the loss of Longman. He was a prime favorite among the pigskin artists, and a general favorite among the student body. His work with the eleven and their subsequent victories made him the hero of every Notre Dame man. Longman put on the field for Notre Dame the classiest group of football players that ever fought under the Catholic colors.

Longman married Edythe Eberbach on July 10, 1906 in Ann Arbor, Michigan.

Longman died from tuberculosis of the lungs and larynx at the University of Michigan Hospital in 1928 at age 45.

== Head coaching record ==
Year	Team	Overall	Conference	Standing	Bowl/playoffs
Arkansas Cardinals/Razorbacks (Independent) (1906–1907)
1906	Arkansas	2–4–2			
1907	Arkansas	3–4–1			
Arkansas:		5–8–3			
Wooster Presbyterians (Ohio Athletic Conference) (1908)
1908	Wooster	3–5	1–5	8th	
Wooster:		3–5	1–5		
Notre Dame Fighting Irish (Independent) (1909–1910)
1909	Notre Dame	7–0–1			
1910	Notre Dame	4–1–1			
Notre Dame:		11–1–2			
Total:		19–14–5			
