= 1904 All-Western college football team =

American all-star college football team

The 1904 All-Western college football team consists of American football players selected to the All-Western teams chosen by various selectors for the 1904 Western Conference football season.

== All-Western selections ==
=== Ends ===
- Claude Rothgeb, Illinois (COL-1, CRH, CT-1, DFP, DT, MJ-2, SLR, WC)
- James Irving Bush, Wisconsin (COL-1, CRH, CT-2, DFP, DT, MJ-1, WC)
- Frederick A. Speik, Chicago (COL-2, CT-2, MJ-2, SLR)
- Bobby Marshall, Minnesota (COL-2, MJ-1) (CFHOF)
- Charles Ferguson Kennedy, Chicago (CT-1)

=== Tackles ===
- Joe Curtis, Michigan (COL-1, CRH, CT-1, DFP, DT, MJ-1, SLR, WC)
- Wilson Bertke, Wisconsin (COL-1, DFP, MJ-1, SLR, WC)
- Ed Parry, Chicago (COL-2, CT-1, DT)
- Percy Porter Brush, Minnesota (CRH, CT-2, MJ-2)
- Charles J. Moynihan, Illinois (CT-2)
- Henry H. Kafir, Northwestern (COL-2)
- George Leland Case, Minnesota (MJ-2)

=== Guards ===
- Walton W. Thorpe, Minnesota (COL-1, CRH, CT-1, DFP, DT, MJ-1, SLR, WC)
- Charles A. Fairweather, Illinois (COL-1, CRH, CT-1, DFP, SLR, WC)
- Charles B. Carter, Michigan (COL-2, CT-2, DT, MJ-1)
- Daniel D. Smith, Minnesota (CT-2)
- Henry Schulte, Michigan (COL-2)
- Louis Donovan, Wisconsin (MJ-2)
- William Atkinson, Iowa (MJ-2)

=== Centers ===
- John Hazelwood, Illinois (COL-1, CRH, CT-1, SLR)
- Richard W. Remp, Wisconsin (COL-2, CT-2, DFP, DT, WC)
- Moses Lane Strathern, Minnesota (MJ-1)
- Charles T. Borg, Nebraska (MJ-2)

=== Quarterbacks ===
- Walter Eckersall, Chicago (COL-1, CRH, CT-1, DFP, DT, MJ-2, SLR, WC) (CFHOF)
- Sigmund Harris, Minnesota (COL-2, CT-2, MJ-1)

=== Halfbacks ===
- Willie Heston, Michigan (COL-1, CRH, CT-1, DFP, DT, MJ-1, SLR, WC) (CFHOF)
- E. J. Vanderboom, Wisconsin (COL-2, CT-2, DFP, DT, MJ-2, SLR, WC)
- Thomas S. Hammond, Michigan (CRH, CT-1, DFP [tackle])
- Otto Nelson Davies, Minnesota (COL-1, CT-2, MJ-1)
- Mark Catlin Sr., Chicago (CT-2, SLR)
- John R. Bender, Nebraska (CT-2, MJ-2)
- James Edward Kremer, Minnesota (COL-2)

=== Fullbacks ===
- Frank Longman, Michigan (COL-1, CRH, CT-2, DFP, DT, MJ-2)
- Hugo Bezdek, Chicago (COL-2, CT-1, WC) (CFHOF)
- Earl Current, Minnesota (CT-2, MJ-1)

== Key ==
COL = Collier's Weekly

CRH = Chicago Record-Herald

CT = Chicago Tribune

DFP = Detroit Free Press

DT = Detroit Tribune

MJ = The Minneapolis Journal, by O'Loughlin

SLR = The St. Louis Republic

WC = Walter Camp in Collier's Weekly

CFHOF = College Football Hall of Fame

== See also ==
- 1904 College Football All-America Team
