= 1904 Michigan Wolverines football team =

American college football season

1904 Michigan Wolverines football
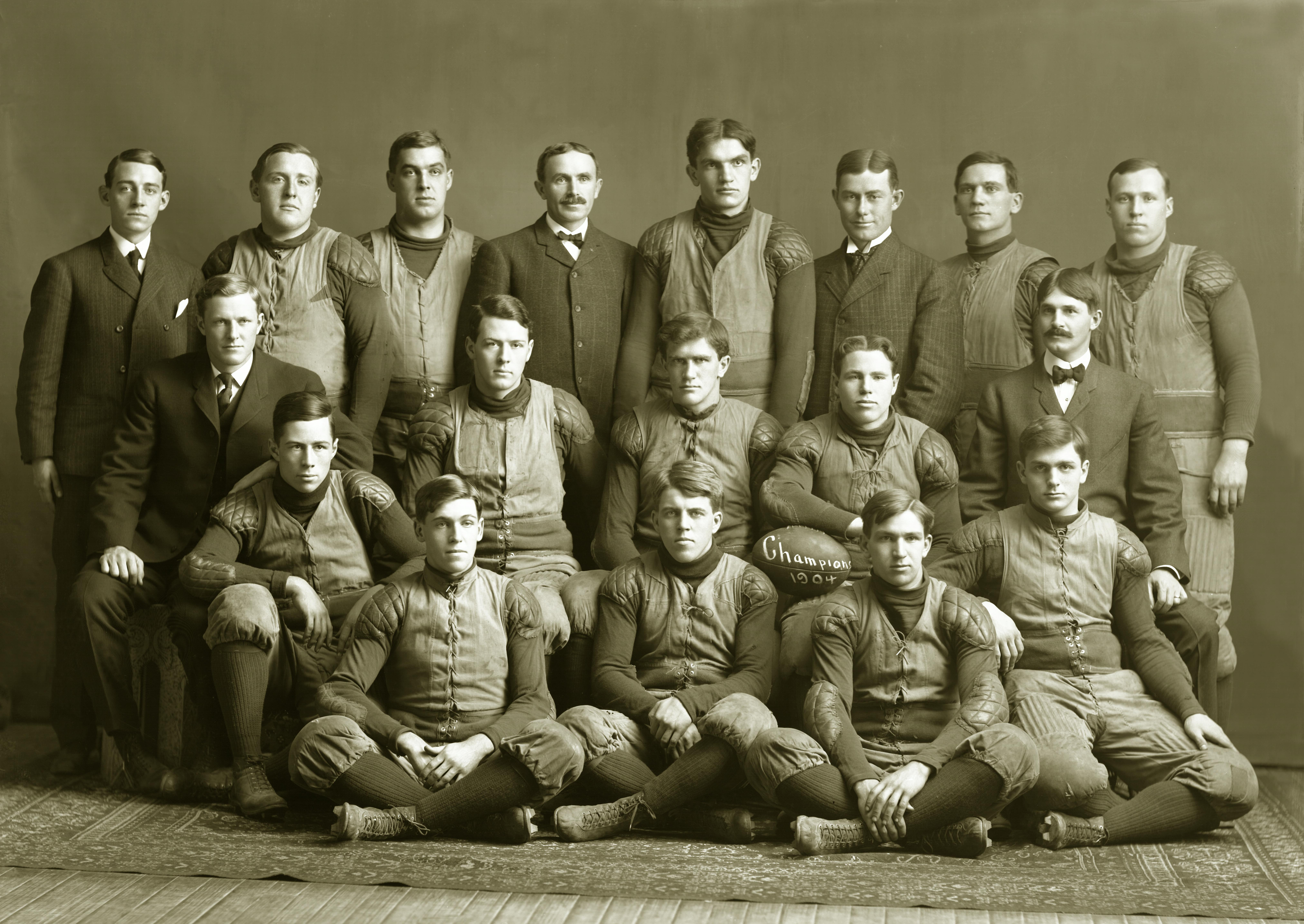

Co-national champion (NCF) Western Conference co-champion
- Conference: Western Conference
- Record: 10–0 (2–0 Western)
- Head coach: Fielding H. Yost (4th season)
- Captain: Willie Heston
- Home stadium: Regents Field

1904 Western Conference football standings
| | Conf. | | | | | Overall |
| Team | W | | L | | T | W | | L | | T |
|---|---|---|---|---|---|---|---|---|---|---|
| Minnesota + | 3 | – | 0 | – | 0 | 13 | – | 0 | – | 0 |
| Michigan + | 2 | – | 0 | – | 0 | 10 | – | 0 | – | 0 |
| Chicago | 5 | – | 1 | – | 1 | 10 | – | 1 | – | 1 |
| Illinois | 3 | – | 1 | – | 1 | 9 | – | 2 | – | 1 |
| Northwestern | 1 | – | 2 | – | 0 | 8 | – | 2 | – | 0 |
| Purdue | 1 | – | 2 | – | 0 | 9 | – | 3 | – | 0 |
| Iowa | 0 | – | 3 | – | 0 | 7 | – | 4 | – | 0 |
| Wisconsin | 0 | – | 3 | – | 0 | 5 | – | 3 | – | 0 |
| Indiana | 0 | – | 3 | – | 0 | 6 | – | 4 | – | 0 |
+ – Conference co-champions

The 1904 Michigan Wolverines football team represented the University of Michigan in the 1904 Western Conference football season. In the team's fourth season under head coach Fielding H. Yost, the Wolverines compiled a perfect 10–0 record and outscored opponents 567–22. The 1904 team was the fourth of Yost's legendary "Point-a-Minute" teams. Michigan's games were of varying length from 22½ minutes to 70 minutes. Over the course of ten games, Michigan played 476 minutes of football and averaged a point scored for every 50.3 seconds played. The team included future College Football Hall of Fame inductee Willie Heston, who scored 20 touchdowns for 100 points that season; touchdowns were worth five points under 1904 rules.

== Schedule ==
| Date | Opponent | Site | Result | Attendance |
|---|---|---|---|---|
| October 1 | Case* | Regents Field; Ann Arbor, MI | W 33–0 | |
| October 5 | Ohio Northern* | Regents Field; Ann Arbor, MI | W 48–0 | |
| October 8 | Kalamazoo* | Regents Field; Ann Arbor, MI | W 95–0 | |
| October 12 | Physicians & Surgeons* | Regents Field; Ann Arbor, MI | W 72–0 | 1,500 |
| October 15 | at Ohio State* | University Park; Columbus, OH (rivalry) | W 31–6 | 8,000 |
| October 19 | American Medical* | Regents Field; Ann Arbor, MI | W 72–0 | |
| October 22 | West Virginia* | Regents Field; Ann Arbor, MI | W 130–0 | 4,000 |
| October 29 | at Wisconsin | Randall Field; Madison, WI | W 28–0 | 11,000 |
| November 5 | Drake* | Regents Field; Ann Arbor, MI | W 36–4 | |
| November 12 | Chicago^{†} | Regents Field; Ann Arbor, MI (rivalry) | W 22–12 | 13,000 |
*Non-conference game; ^{†}Homecoming

== Game summaries ==
=== Michigan 33, Case 0 ===
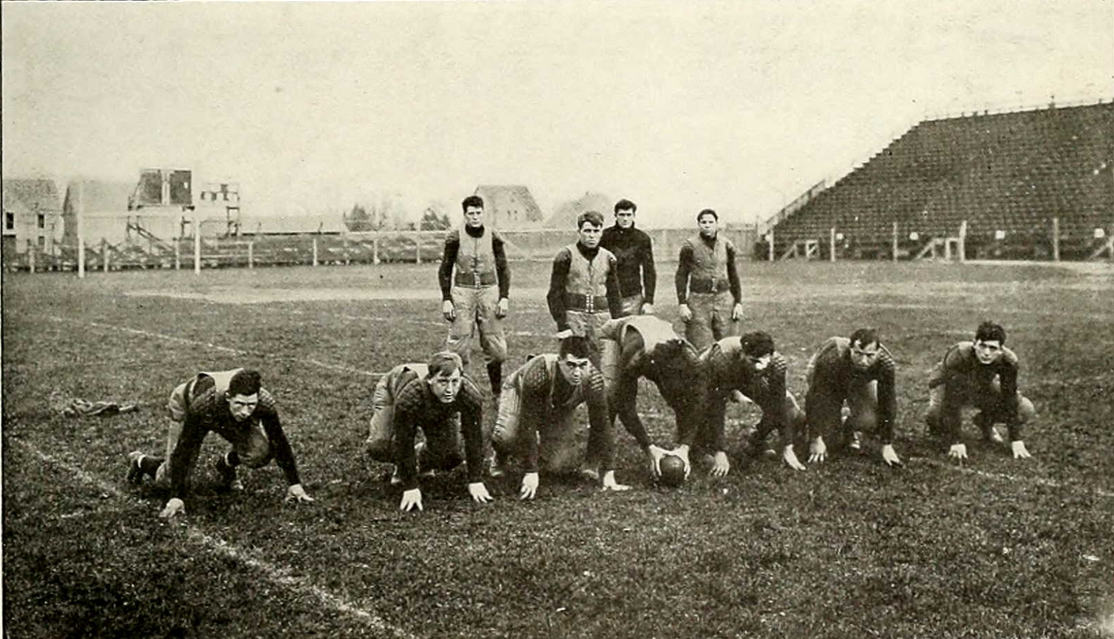
1904 Michigan football team

Michigan opened the 1904 college football season on October 1 with a 33–0 win over Cleveland's Case School of Applied Science. The game was played in 20-minute halves, and the Wolverines scored 22 points in the first half. Numerous substitutions were made at half-time, and the backup players added 11 points in the second half. Fullback Frank Longman scored three touchdowns in the game, and Willie Heston, Walter Rheinschild, and Joe Curtis scored one touchdown each. Tom Hammond converted three extra point kicks. Heston's touchdown came on a 75-yard run. Case managed only one first down in the game.

The Michigan players appearing in the game were: John Garrels (left end), Joe Curtis (left tackle), Henry Schulte (left guard), Ted Hammond (starting center), Germany Schulz (right guard), Roy Beechler (starting right tackle and substitute at center), Smull (substitute at right tackle), Tom Hammond (starting right end), Harry Patrick (substitute at right end), Fred Norcross (starting quarterback and substitute at right halfback), Walter Becker (substitute at quarterback), Willie Heston (starting left halfback), William Dennison Clark (substitute at left halfback), Ted Stuart (starting right halfback), James DePree (substitute at right halfback), Frank Longman (starting fullback), and Walter Rheinschild (substitute at fullback).

| Player | Position | Starter | Touchdowns | Extra points | Field goals | Points |
|---|---|---|---|---|---|---|
| Longman | Fullback | Yes | 3 | 0 | 0 | 15 |
| Heston | Left halfback | Yes | 1 | 0 | 0 | 5 |
| Curtis | Left tackle | Yes | 1 | 0 | 0 | 5 |
| Rheinschild | Fullback | No | 1 | 0 | 0 | 5 |
| Tom Hammond | Right end | No | 0 | 3 | 0 | 3 |
| Total | -- | -- | 6 | 3 | 0 | 33 |

=== Michigan 48, Ohio Northern 0 ===
In the second game of the 1904 season, Michigan defeated Ohio Northern, 38–0, in a game consisting of halves of 20 and 15 minutes. Willie Heston scored three touchdowns and had runs of 45, 32, 35 and 30 yards.

| Player | Position | Starter | Touchdowns | Extra points | Field goals | Points |
|---|---|---|---|---|---|---|
| Heston | Left halfback | Yes | 3 | 0 | 0 | 15 |
| Tom Hammond | Right end | Yes | 0 | 5 | 2 | 13 |
| H. Hammond | Fullback | Yes | 2 | 0 | 0 | 10 |
| Clark | Fullback | No | 1 | 0 | 0 | 5 |
| Hal Weeks | Right halfback | No | 1 | 0 | 0 | 5 |
| Total | -- | -- | 7 | 5 | 2 | 48 |

=== Michigan 95, Kalamazoo 0 ===
In the third game of the season, Michigan defeated Kalamazoo College, 95–0, in a game consisting of two 20-minute halves. Heston scored six touchdowns and had long touchdown runs of 65, 70, 85 and 65 yards.

| Player | Position | Starter | Touchdowns | Extra points | Field goals | Points |
|---|---|---|---|---|---|---|
| Heston | Left halfback | Yes | 6 | 0 | 0 | 30 |
| H. Hammond | Fullback | Yes | 5 | 0 | 0 | 25 |
| Tom Hammond | Right tackle | Yes | 0 | 15 | 0 | 15 |
| Patrick | Left tackle | No | 2 | 0 | 0 | 10 |
| Hal Weeks | Right halfback | No | 1 | 0 | 0 | 5 |
| Clark | Right end | No | 1 | 0 | 0 | 5 |
| Schulte | Center | Yes | 1 | 0 | 0 | 5 |
| Total | -- | -- | 16 | 15 | 0 | 95 |

=== Michigan 72, Physicians & Surgeons 0 ===
In the fourth game of the season, Michigan defeated the Physicians & Surgeons team 72–0 in a short mid-week game lasting only 22½ minutes, a 15-minute first half and a 7½ minute second half. Quarterback Fred Norcross scored four touchdowns, and Heston scored three. Norcross had touchdown runs of 67, 35 and 90 yards.

| Player | Position | Starter | Touchdowns | Extra points | Field goals | Points |
|---|---|---|---|---|---|---|
| Tom Hammond | Right tackle | Yes | 2 | 12 | 0 | 22 |
| Norcross | Quarterback | Yes | 4 | 0 | 0 | 20 |
| Heston | Left halfback | Yes | 3 | 0 | 0 | 15 |
| Curtis | Left tackle | Yes | 1 | 0 | 0 | 5 |
| Clark | Right end | Yes | 1 | 0 | 0 | 5 |
| H. Hammond | Right halfback | Yes | 1 | 0 | 0 | 5 |
| Total | -- | -- | 12 | 12 | 0 | 72 |

=== Michigan 31, Ohio State 6 ===
Michigan defeated Ohio State, 31–6, in a game consisting of 30-minute halves in Columbus, Ohio. Heston scored three touchdowns, bringing his season total to 16.

| Player | Position | Starter | Touchdowns | Extra points | Field goals | Points |
|---|---|---|---|---|---|---|
| Heston | Left halfback | Yes | 3 | 0 | 0 | 15 |
| Tom Hammond | Right tackle | Yes | 0 | 3 | 2 | 11 |
| H. Hammond | Right halfback | Yes | 1 | 0 | 0 | 5 |
| Total | -- | -- | 4 | 3 | 2 | 31 |

=== Michigan 72, American Medical 0 ===
For its sixth game of the season, Michigan played a short mid-week game against the American Medical School. The game consisted of a 20-minute first half and a 3½ minute second half. Right halfback Clark led the scoring with four touchdowns. Weeks scored three touchdowns. Heston was limited to a single touchdown.

| Player | Position | Starter | Touchdowns | Extra points | Field goals | Points |
|---|---|---|---|---|---|---|
| Clark | Right halfback | Yes | 4 | 0 | 0 | 20 |
| Hal Weeks | Fullback | Yes | 3 | 0 | 0 | 15 |
| Curtis | Left tackle | Yes | 1 | 5 | 0 | 10 |
| Magoffin | Left halfback | No | 1 | 2 | 0 | 7 |
| Carter | Right guard | Yes | 1 | 0 | 0 | 5 |
| Heston | Left halfback | Yes | 1 | 0 | 0 | 5 |
| Rheinschild | Left end | No | 1 | 0 | 0 | 5 |
| Patrick | Left tackle | No | 1 | 0 | 0 | 5 |
| Total | -- | -- | 13 | 7 | 0 | 72 |

=== Michigan 130, West Virginia 0 ===
The most lopsided score in Michigan football history. In a game consisting of 25 and 20-minute halves, the Wolverines scored 22 touchdowns and 20 extra points (which would have resulted in a margin of 152-0 under modern scoring rules). Joe Curtis alone accounted for 49 points with six touchdowns and 19 extra points. The undefeated 1904 team won Michigan's fourth national championship and scored 567 points in 476 minutes of football, averaging a point every 50.3 seconds. For the first time in the 1904 season, Heston did not score.

| Player | Position | Starter | Touchdowns | Extra points | Field goals | Points |
|---|---|---|---|---|---|---|
| Curtis | Left tackle | Yes | 6 | 19 | 0 | 49 |
| Norcross | Quarterback | Yes | 5 | 0 | 0 | 25 |
| Clark | Fullback | Yes | 3 | 0 | 0 | 15 |
| Magoffin | Right halfback | Yes | 2 | 1 | 0 | 11 |
| Graham | Right tackle | Yes | 1 | 0 | 0 | 5 |
| Patrick | Right tackle | No | 1 | 0 | 0 | 5 |
| H. Hammond | Right end | Yes | 1 | 0 | 0 | 5 |
| Schulte | Left guard | Yes | 1 | 0 | 0 | 5 |
| Carter | Right guard | Yes | 1 | 0 | 0 | 5 |
| Becker | Quarterback | No | 1 | 0 | 0 | 5 |
| Total | -- | -- | 22 | 20 | 0 | 130 |

=== Michigan 28, Wisconsin 0 ===
Michigan played its first full-length game (two 35-minute halves) of the season against Wisconsin. Michigan won the game, 28–0. Heston and Carter each scored two touchdowns, and Norcross added another.

| Player | Position | Starter | Touchdowns | Extra points | Field goals | Points |
|---|---|---|---|---|---|---|
| Heston | Left halfback | Yes | 2 | 0 | 0 | 10 |
| Carter | Right guard | Yes | 2 | 0 | 0 | 10 |
| Norcross | Quarterback | Yes | 1 | 0 | 0 | 5 |
| Tom Hammond | Right halfback | Yes | 0 | 2 | 0 | 2 |
| Curtis | Left tackle | Yes | 0 | 1 | 0 | 1 |
| Total | -- | -- | 5 | 3 | 0 | 28 |

=== Michigan 36, Drake 4 ===
In its ninth game, Michigan defeated the team from Drake by a score of 36–4. The game was played in two 25-minute halves. Curtis led the scoring with 16 points on two touchdowns and six extra point kicks. Willie Heston did not play in the game.

| Player | Position | Starter | Touchdowns | Extra points | Field goals | Points |
|---|---|---|---|---|---|---|
| Curtis | Left tackle | Yes | 2 | 6 | 0 | 16 |
| Carter | Right guard | Yes | 2 | 0 | 0 | 10 |
| Stuart | Right end | Yes | 1 | 0 | 0 | 5 |
| Tom Hammond | Right halfback | Yes | 1 | 0 | 0 | 5 |
| Total | -- | -- | 6 | 6 | 0 | 36 |

=== Michigan 22, Chicago 12 ===
Michigan concluded an undefeated season with a 22–12 win over the University of Chicago on November 12. The game, played in 35-minute halves, featured several College Football Hall of Fame inductees, including Walter Eckersall and Hugo Bezdek for Chicago and Willie Heston and Germany Schulz for Michigan. Heston, Eckersall and Bezdek each scored single touchdowns, but the lead scorer was Michigan's Tom Hammond with 17 points on three touchdowns and two extra points. Heston finished the season with 20 touchdowns for 100 points.

| Player | Position | Starter | Touchdowns | Extra points | Field goals | Points |
|---|---|---|---|---|---|---|
| Tom Hammond | Right halfback | Yes | 3 | 2 | 0 | 17 |
| Heston | Left halfback | Yes | 1 | 0 | 0 | 5 |
| Total | -- | -- | 4 | 2 | 0 | 22 |

== Players ==
=== Varsity letter winners ===
The following 13 players received varsity "M" letters for their participation on the 1904 football team:

| Player | Position | Games started | Hometown |
|---|---|---|---|
| Charles B. Carter | Right guard | 8 | Lewiston, Maine |
| William Dennison Clark | Left end Right end Fullback; Right halfback | 2; 2; 1; 1 | Detroit, Michigan |
| Joe Curtis | Left tackle | 10 | Brooklyn, New York |
| Walter D. Graham | Right tackle | 6 | Chicago, Illinois |
| Harry S. Hammond | Right end Fullback; Right halfback | 4; 2; 2 | Chicago, Illinois |
| Tom Hammond | Right tackle Right end Right halfback | 3; 3; 3 | Chicago, Illinois |
| Willie Heston | Left halfback | 9 | Grants Pass, Oregon |
| Frank Longman | Fullback | 4 | Battle Creek, Michigan |
| Fred Norcross | Quarterback | 10 | Menominee, Michigan |
| Henry Schulte | Left guard Center | 7; 3 | Jefferson Barracks, Missouri |
| Germany Schulz | Center; Left guard Right guard | 5; 3; 2 | Fort Wayne, Indiana |
| Ted Stuart | Right end Right halfback | 1; 1 | Chariton, Iowa |
| Harold Weeks | Fullback; Left end | 3; 2 | Allegan, Michigan |

=== Scoring leaders ===
| Player | Touchdowns | Extra points | Field goals | Points |
|---|---|---|---|---|
| Willie Heston | 20 | 0 | 0 | 100 |
| Tom Hammond | 6 | 42 | 4 | 88 |
| Joe Curtis | 11 | 31 | 0 | 86 |
| Fred Norcross | 10 | 0 | 0 | 50 |
| Harry Hammond | 10 | 0 | 0 | 50 |
| Wm. Clark | 10 | 0 | 0 | 50 |
| Charles Carter | 6 | 0 | 0 | 30 |
| Harold Weeks | 5 | 0 | 0 | 25 |
| Harry Patrick | 4 | 0 | 0 | 20 |
| Paul Magoffin | 3 | 3 | 0 | 18 |
| Frank Longman | 3 | 0 | 0 | 15 |
| Walter Rheinschild | 2 | 0 | 0 | 10 |
| Henry Schulte | 2 | 0 | 0 | 10 |
| Walter Graham | 1 | 0 | 0 | 5 |
| Walter Becker | 1 | 0 | 0 | 5 |
| Ted Stuart | 1 | 0 | 0 | 5 |

=== Reserves ===
- Charles W. Anderson, Albion, Michigan
- Harry S. Bartlett, Detroit, Michigan
- Walter Cooley Becker, Chicago, Illinois
- Roy Beechler, Ithaca, New York - started 1 game at right tackle
- James DePree, Holland, Michigan
- Robert M. Drysdale, Wooster, Ohio
- George Palmer Edmonds, Wayne, Michigan
- John Garrels, left end, Detroit, Michigan - started 6 games at left end
- Edward P. "Ted" Hammond, Detroit, Michigan - started 2 games at center
- John F. Lewis, Covington, Indiana
- Jay Mack Love, Arkansas City, Kansas
- Paul Magoffin, Washington, D.C. - started 3 games at right halfback
- William Joseph Miller, Escanaba, Michigan
- Harry E. Patrick, Detroit, Michigan - started 1 game at left halfback
- Duncan H. Pierce, Buffalo, New York
- Walter Rheinschild, Los Angeles, California
- Mason Rumney, Detroit, Michigan
- Reuben S. Schmidt, Los Angeles, California
- Charles Smoyer, Wadsworth, Ohio
- Edward G. Weeks, Allegan, Michigan
- Harry A. Workman, Chicago, Illinois

=== Others ===
- Charles A. Briggs, Red Oak, Iowa
- William Cole, Charlottesville, Virginia
- Roswell Murray Wendell, Detroit, Michigan

== Awards and honors ==
- Captain: Willie Heston
- All-Americans: Willie Heston (as selected by Walter Camp, New York Evening Telegram, and Fred Lowenthal); Joe Curtis (as selected by Fred Lowenthal)
- All-Western: Willie Heston (Chicago Record-Herald, Chicago Tribune, Detroit Free Press, Detroit Tribune), Tom Hammond (Chicago Record-Herald, Chicago Tribune, Detroit Free Press), Frank Longman (Chicago Record-Herald, Detroit Free Press, Detroit Tribune), Joe Curtis (Chicago Record-Herald, Chicago Tribune, Detroit Tribune), Carter (Detroit Tribune)

== Coaching staff ==
- Head coach: Fielding H. Yost
- Assistant coach: William C. "King" Cole
- Trainer: Keene Fitzpatrick
- Graduate director of athletics: Charles A. Baird
- Manager: A.H. Montgomery
