= 1904 Purdue Boilermakers football team =

American college football season

1904 Purdue Boilermakers football
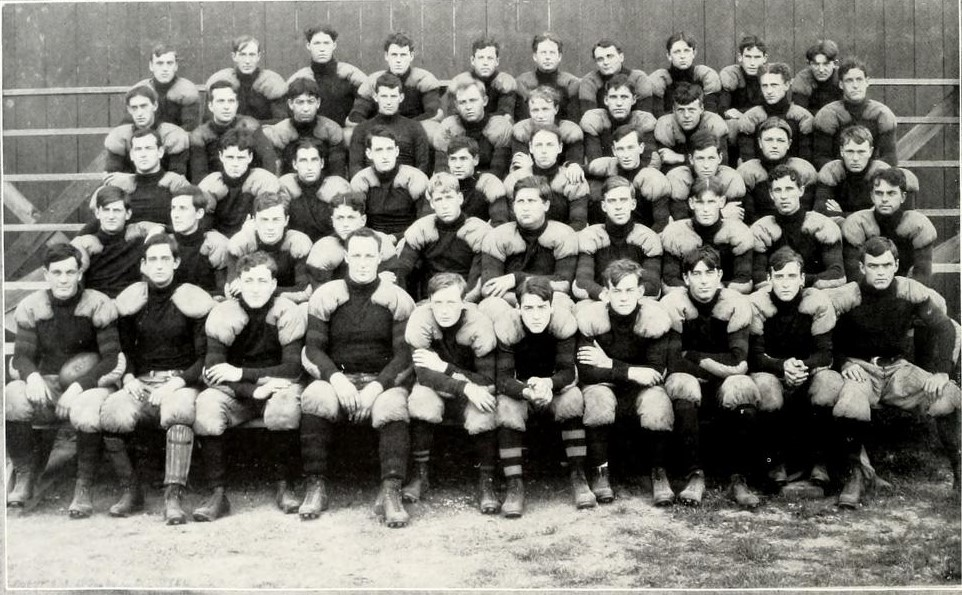
- Conference: Western Conference
- Record: 9–3 (1–2 Western)
- Head coach: Oliver Cutts (2nd season)
- Captain: D. M. Allen
- Home stadium: Stuart Field

1904 Western Conference football standings
	Conf.					Overall
Team	W		L		T	W		L		T
Minnesota +	3	–	0	–	0	13	–	0	–	0
Michigan +	2	–	0	–	0	10	–	0	–	0
Chicago	5	–	1	–	1	10	–	1	–	1
Illinois	3	–	1	–	1	9	–	2	–	1
Northwestern	1	–	2	–	0	8	–	2	–	0
Purdue	1	–	2	–	0	9	–	3	–	0
Iowa	0	–	3	–	0	7	–	4	–	0
Wisconsin	0	–	3	–	0	5	–	3	–	0
Indiana	0	–	3	–	0	6	–	4	–	0
+ – Conference co-champions

The 1904 Purdue Boilermakers football team was an American football team that represented Purdue University during the 1904 Western Conference football season. It was the Boilermakers' first season following the disastrous 1903 Purdue Wreck in which 14 players were killed. In their second season under head coach Oliver Cutts, the Boilermakers compiled a 9–3 record, finished in sixth place in the Western Conference with a 1–2 record against conference opponents, and outscored all opponents by a total of 176 to 66. D. M. Allen was the team captain.

== Schedule ==
Date	Time	Opponent	Site	Result	Attendance	Source
September 17	vs.	Purdue alumni*	Stuart Field; West Lafayette, IN	L 2–6		
September 24		North Division High School*	Stuart Field; West Lafayette, IN	W 5–0		
September 28		Beloit*	Stuart Field; West Lafayette, IN	W 11–0		
October 1		Earlham*	Stuart Field; West Lafayette, IN	W 28–11		
October 8		at Chicago	Marshall Field; Chicago, IL (rivalry)	L 0–20	4,000	
October 15		Wabash*	Stuart Field; West Lafayette, IN	W 6–0		
October 22		Illinois	Stuart Field; West Lafayette, IN (rivalry)	L 6–24		
October 28	2:30 p.m.	vs. Missouri*	World's Fair Stadium; St. Louis, MO	W 11–0	3,000	
November 5		Medical College of Indiana*	Stuart Field; West Lafayette, IN	W 34–5		
November 12		vs. Indiana	Washington Park; Indianapolis, IN (rivalry)	W 27–0	15,000	
November 19		Culver Military Academy*	Stuart Field; West Lafayette, IN	W 10–0		
November 24		Notre Dame*	Stuart Field; West Lafayette, IN (rivalry)	W 36–0		
*Non-conference game

== Roster ==
- Harry Adams, HB
- D. M. Allen, T
- Harold Emies, T
- R. W. Fleming, E
- A. L. Holter, HB
- Thomas Johnston, QB
- E. P. King, G
- Joseph Knapp, HB
- Walt Krull, E
- D. H. Long, T
- Irving Long, T-G
- O. A. McCormick, E
- J. H. Mowrey, HB
- W. E. Russell, HB
- Roy Shackleton, QB
- Homer Thomas, FB
- W. Wellinghoff, C
- E. W. Worsham, HB
- C. Zimmerman, HB
