= Thomas J. Smull =

American professor, athletics administrator, athlete, and coach

Biographical details
- Born: September 22, 1875; Mackeyville, Pennsylvania, U.S.
- Died: February 15, 1962 (aged 86); Lima, Ohio, U.S.

Playing career

Football
- 1904: Michigan
- Position: Right tackle

Coaching career (HC unless noted)

Football
- 1905: Ohio Northern
- 1910: Ohio Northern
- 1918: Ohio Northern

Baseball
- 1910–1911: Ohio Northern

Head coaching record
- Overall: 5–13 (football); 16–25–1 (baseball)

Thomas Jefferson Smull (September 22, 1875 – February 15, 1962) was an American professor of engineering, athletics administrator, athlete, and coach. He was the head football coach at Ohio Northern University in 1905, 1910 and 1918. A member of the faculty at Ohio Northern from 1905 to 1942, he was also the faculty manager of athletics and was known as the school's "father of athletics".

== Early years and college athlete ==
Smull was born in 1875 in Mackeyville, Pennsylvania. He attended the Central State Normal School (now known as Lock Haven University of Pennsylvania) in Lock Haven, Pennsylvania. He played for the school's baseball team in 1897 and 1898. In 1900, he enrolled at Susquehanna University where he again played for that school's baseball team.

In 1901, Smull enrolled at Ohio Northern University. He remained active in athletics and was chosen as captain of both the football and baseball teams. He graduated from Ohio Northern in 1904 with a degree in civil engineering.

In October 1903, Smull played in a football game against Michigan. Michigan coach Fielding H. Yost was impressed by Smull and recruited him. In the fall of 1904, Smull transferred to Michigan. He appeared in five games for Yost's 1904 "Point-a-Minute" football team that compiled a 10–0 record and outscored opponents, 567 to 22.

Smull left Michigan before the end of the 1904 season, transferring to Lafayette College. According to one account, he was found it impossible to arrange a schedule at Michigan that also allowed him to pursue his studies.

== Professor and coach ==
Smull returned to Ohio Northern in 1905 as the head of the engineering department and faculty manager of athletics. He had exclusive control over the school's athletic program from 1905 to 1908. In 1908, he organized the Ohio Northern University Athletic Board and served as its chairman for five years. He remained as the honorary president and advisor to the Athletic Board until 1922.

In 1916, he led Ohio Northern's successful effort to seek admission to the Ohio Athletic Conference (OAC). He remained the school's faculty representative with the OAC for many years. He retired from the Ohio Northern faculty in 1942.

== Later years and honors ==
From 1942 to 1955, he was a materials engineer for the Ohio Department of Highways. He died in 1962 in Lima, Ohio.

As a tribute to Smull's contributions, Ohio Northern's engineering college is known as the T.J. Smull College of Engineering.

In 1968, Smull was selected as one of the six inaugural inductees into the Ohio Northern Athletics Hall of Fame.

== Head coaching record ==
=== Football ===
Year	Team	Overall	Conference	Standing	Bowl/playoffs
Ohio Northern (Independent) (1905)
1905	Ohio Northern	2–3			
Ohio Northern (Independent) (1910)
1910	Ohio Northern	2–5			
Ohio Northern (Ohio Athletic Conference) (1918)
1918	Ohio Northern	1–5	0–5	T–14th	
Ohio Northern:		5–13	0–5		
Total:		5–13			
