= Joe Curtis =

American football player and coach (1882–1972)

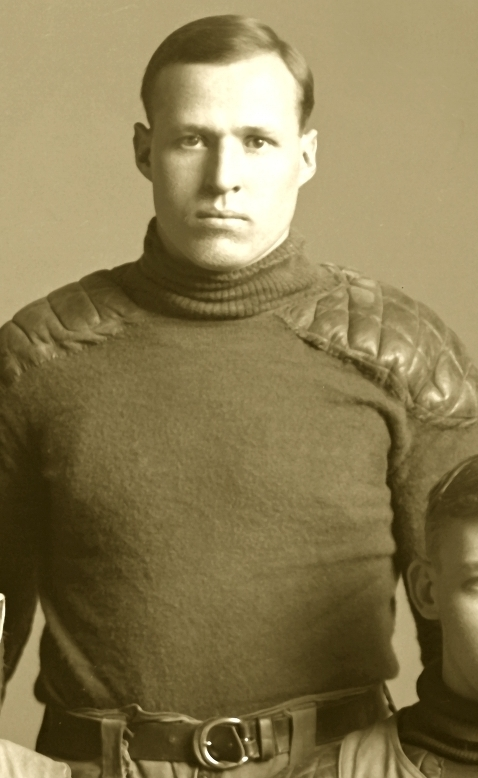

Biographical details
- Born: November 14, 1882; Pueblo, Colorado, U.S.
- Died: January 29, 1972 (aged 89); Kansas City, Missouri, U.S.

Playing career
- 1903–1906: Michigan
- Position: Tackle

Coaching career (HC unless noted)
- 1907–1908: Tulane
- 1909: Colorado Mines

Head coaching record
- Overall: 13–6

Accomplishments and honors

Championships
- 2× National (1903, 1904)

Awards
- 2× Second-team All-American (1904, 1905); 3× First-team All-Western (1904, 1905, 1906)

John Spencer "Big Joe" Curtis (November 14, 1882 – January 29, 1972) was an American football player and coach. While playing for the University of Michigan, he was selected as a first-team All-Western tackle three consecutive years from 1904 to 1906 and as an All-American in 1904 and 1905. In his four seasons as the starting left tackle for the Michigan Wolverines, the team compiled a record of 37–2–1, won two national championships and outscored opponents by a combined total of 1,699 to 60. Curtis later served as the head football coach at Tulane University from 1907 to 1908 and at the Colorado School of Mines in 1909.

== Football player ==
A native of Pueblo, Colorado, Curtis played three years of high school football in Colorado. He enrolled at the University of Michigan in 1903 to play football for Fielding H. Yost's famous "Point-a-Minute" football teams. He played tackle for the Michigan Wolverines from 1903 to 1906.

=== 1903 season ===
As a freshman in 1903, Curtis was selected by Yost to play on the varsity football team. He started all twelve games at left tackle for the Michigan team that finished the season with a record of 11–0–1, outscored opponents 565–6, and has been retrospectively declared National Champions.

=== 1904 season ===
In 1904, Curtis started all ten games at left tackle for the Michigan football team that compiled a 10–0 record, outscored opponents 567–22, and has been retrospectively declared national champions. At the end of the 1904 season, Curtis was selected as a first-team All-Western tackle by the Chicago Daily News, Chicago Journal, Chicago Post and Chicago News. The Chicago Tribune also selected Curtis for its 1904 All-Western team and noted: "Curtis of Michigan has been the star tackle of the year. Weighing 230 pounds, strong, active, he has outplayed every opponent. Seldom has he been 'boxed in' by end of tackle plays, and in getting down the field under punts he has often preceded his ends. On the offense he has developed into one of the best ground gainers on Yost's eleven, and has been most effective in disposing of his opponents when his team has had possession of the ball."

Although Eastern football writer Walter Camp picked Curtis as a second-team All-American in 1904, at least one All-American selector also chose Curtis as a first-team All-American. In announcing the selection, that writer said: "Hogan of Yale is the best tackle of the year. Next to him is Curtis of Michigan, a wonder on defense and almost as strong in tearing up interference as the blue captain. There can be little doubt of the ability of this pair to make the real 'All-America.'"

=== 1905 season ===
Curtis was considered one of the best defensive players in the West, but he was also a leading ball-carrier and kicker for Michigan on offense. In 1905, he started all 13 games at left tackle and was one of the leading scorers for a team that compiled a record of 12–1 and outscored its opponents 495–0 in the first 12 games before losing to the Chicago 2–0 on Thanksgiving Day. Curtis's individual scoring totals in 1905 included the following:

- In a 44–0 win over Kalamazoo College, Curtis scored three touchdowns.
- In a 36–0 win over Case, Curtis scored two touchdowns and kicked a "goal from touchdown."
- In a 23–0 win over Ohio Northern, Curtis scored two touchdowns and three goals from touchdown.
- In an 18–0 win over Vanderbilt, Curtis scored a touchdown and "did yeoman service in advancing the ball, by both hurdling and straight smashing."
- In a 31–0 win over Nebraska, Curtis scored a touchdown.
- In a 70–0 win over Albion College, Curtis scored a touchdown and ten goals from touchdown.
- In a 48–0 win over Drake, Curtis scored seven goals from touchdown.
- In a 40–0 win over Ohio State, Curtis scored a touchdown and a goal from touchdown.
- In a 75–0 win over Oberlin College, Curtis scored four touchdowns and two goals from touchdown.

In the season's final game at Chicago, Curtis was disqualified early in the game on grounds of unnecessary roughness. Early in the game, Chicago quarterback Walter Eckersall, considered the best player in the West, dropped back for a punt from Chicago's 40-yard line, and Curtis broke through and threw Eckersall to the frozen ground as he tried to block the kick. Eckersall lay on the ground knocked out for two minutes following the blow. The referee ruled that Curtis had swung an upper cut at Eckersall's jaw and ruled Curtis out of the game. A newspaper account of the incident reported that, after Eckersall had gotten the punt safely away, Curtis, who had broken through, "came down on the little maroon like a whirlwind, knocking him down." Without Curtis in the lineup, Michigan lost its first game since 1900, losing to Chicago by a score of 2 to 0. After the game, Yost observed, "Michigan's chances were materially lessened when Curtis went out." The ruling ejecting Curtis from the Chicago game became a source of controversy. Eckersall himself spoke in defense of Curtis:

"I will never believe that Curtis intended to rough it with me in that unfortunate incident in the Michigan game. He was doing his best to block the punt, but could not stop in time to keep from running me down. I have known Curtis for several years, and he is a gentleman and one of the best sportsmen I have ever met. I feel that he has been unjustly censured for the play in which I was injured and for which he was ruled out of the game."

Two weeks after the Chicago game, the Michigan football players unanimously elected Curtis as captain of the 1906 football team. The players noted that Curtis was given the honor both due to his ability as a player and "the desire of the team to evidence their belief that the ruling out of Curtis from the Chicago game on Thanksgiving day for alleged unnecessary roughness in play was entirely unjustified." The selection of Curtis was reported to be "peculiarly pleasing to Ann Arbor's students ... because they think that his disqualification in the Chicago match was a great injustice and mistake."

After the 1905 season, Walter Camp named Curtis as a second-team All-American for the second consecutive year. In selecting Curtis, Camp noted:

"Curtis, of Michigan, mentioned in these columns last year, is a type of man the east has not seen, but he would be something of a revelation. He is heavier than any of the standard eastern tackles, but so quick on his feet ... Curtis is also good on defense. ... He is a good plunger and works well with a heavy back field."

=== 1906 season ===
In 1906, Yost undertook what was referred to in the press as a "startling shift" in moving Curtis to the left end position. One sports writer referred to Curtis as a "mastodon," and noted that, although he "carries something like an eighth of a ton of beef and brawn whenever he moves," he also had "the speed of a quarter horse." Under the rules of the day, the five middle linemen were not permitted to drop back of the line scrimmage unless they were at least five yards behind the line when the ball was put in play. By placing Curtis at end, Yost explained that he would give Curtis the ability to play on the line or back off without having to be a full five feet behind the line. In this way, Curtis could be used both to receive the ball and open holes.

In the first four games of the 1906 football season, Curtis started two games at left end and two games at left tackle. Michigan won those four games by a combined score of 72 to 13.

The fifth and final game of the short 1906 season pitted Michigan against Pennsylvania. One week before the Penn game, Curtis suffered a badly broken leg during a practice game. He had been running with the ball when he was tackled by a member of the scrub team, and "his leg was heard to snap." Due to the seriousness of the injury, Curtis was hospitalized for several weeks and did not play in the Penn game.

In Curtis's four years at Michigan, the football team lost only two games — the 1905 Chicago game from which Curtis was ejected for unnecessary roughness and the 1906 Penn game in which Curtis could not play due to his broken leg.

Based on the games played before the injury, Curtis was selected as a first-team All-Western player in 1906 by the Chicago Tribune, Inter-Ocean, and Chicago Chronicle.

After four years starting at the tackle position for Michigan, Curtis had "earned a reputation as the greatest tackle that ever played football in the west."

Curtis graduated from the University of Michigan as part of the engineering school's Class of 1907.

== Football coach ==
=== Tulane ===
After graduating from Michigan, Curtis served as the head football coach at Tulane in 1907 and 1908. Shortly after being hired at Tulane, Curtis proposed an international football game with Tulane playing against the University of Havana in Havana, Cuba. Some called it a stunt. After consecutive winless seasons in 1905 and 1906, Curtis coached Tulane to a 3–2 record in 1907. In 1908, he led the Tulane team to a 7–1 season — the best record in the school's history to that time — including wins over the Texas Longhorns, the Ole Miss Rebels, Centre College Praying Colonels, Washington Bears and the Baylor Bears. In 1909, Curtis retired as Tulane's coach and announced plans to enter business in his home state of Colorado.

=== School of Mines ===
In September 1909, Curtis was hired to serve as the head football coach for the Colorado School of Mines in Golden, Colorado. In November 1909, a Colorado Springs newspaper reported that Curtis had injected "more ginger" into the school's playbook and had "planned a number of new and spectacular formations." At the end of the 1909 season, Curtis resigned as football coach at the School of Mines, declining an offer to make him a member of the faculty and director of athletics will full charge of the gymnasium and all athletic programs. Curtis announced that his sole reason for declining the offer was his desire to go into business.

After retiring from coaching, Curtis lived in Denver and was called upon to referee important inter-collegiate football games.

== Head coaching record ==
Year	Team	Overall	Conference	Standing	Bowl/playoffs
Tulane Olive and Blue (Independent) (1907–1908)
1907	Tulane	3–2			
1908	Tulane	7–1			
Tulane:		10–3			
Colorado Mines Orediggers (Colorado Faculty Athletic Conference) (1909)
1909	Colorado Mines	3–3	0–2	T–3rd	
Colorado Mines:		3–3	0–2		
Total:		13–6			

== See also ==
- List of Michigan Wolverines football All-Americans
