= 1904 Iowa Hawkeyes football team =

American college football season

1904 Iowa Hawkeyes football
- Conference: Western Conference
- Record: 7–4 (0–3 Western)
- Head coach: John Chalmers (2nd season)
- Captain: Nyle Jones
- Home stadium: Iowa Field

1904 Western Conference football standings
	Conf.					Overall
Team	W		L		T	W		L		T
Minnesota +	3	–	0	–	0	13	–	0	–	0
Michigan +	2	–	0	–	0	10	–	0	–	0
Chicago	5	–	1	–	1	10	–	1	–	1
Illinois	3	–	1	–	1	9	–	2	–	1
Northwestern	1	–	2	–	0	8	–	2	–	0
Purdue	1	–	2	–	0	9	–	3	–	0
Iowa	0	–	3	–	0	7	–	4	–	0
Wisconsin	0	–	3	–	0	5	–	3	–	0
Indiana	0	–	3	–	0	6	–	4	–	0
+ – Conference co-champions

The 1904 Iowa Hawkeyes football team was an American football team that represented the State University of Iowa ("S.U.I."), now commonly known as the University of Iowa, as a member of the Western Conference during the 1904 Western Conference football season. In their second year under head coach John Chalmers, the Hawkeyes compiled a 7–4 record (0–3 in conference games), finished in a three-way tie for last place in the Western Conference, and outscored opponents by a total of 251 to 109.

The team played its home games at Iowa Field in Iowa City, Iowa.

== Schedule ==
Date	Opponent	Site	Result	Source
September 24	Coe*	Iowa Field; Iowa City, IA	W 17–0	
September 28	Augustana (IL)*	Iowa Field; Iowa City, IA	W 33–2	
October 1	Cornell (IA)*	Iowa Field; Iowa City, IA	W 88–0	
October 8	at Drake*	Haskins Field; Des Moines, IA	W 17–0	
October 15	at Chicago	Marshall Field; Chicago, IL	L 0–39	
October 22	Iowa State Normal*	Iowa Field; Iowa City, IA	W 11–5	
October 29	Iowa State*	Iowa Field; Iowa City, IA (rivalry)	W 10–6	
November 5	at Nebraska*	Antelope Field; Lincoln, NE (rivalry)	L 6–17	
November 12	Grinnell*	Iowa Field; Iowa City, IA	W 69–0	
November 19	at Illinois	Illinois Field; Champaign, IL	L 0–29	
November 24	vs. Minnesota	Cedar Rapids, IA (rivalry)	L 0–11	
*Non-conference game
