= 1904 Wisconsin Badgers football team =

American college football season

1904 Wisconsin Badgers football
- Conference: Western Conference
- Record: 5–3 (0–3 Western)
- Head coach: Arthur Hale Curtis (1st season)
- Captain: James Bush
- Home stadium: Randall Field

1904 Western Conference football standings
| | Conf. | | | | | Overall |
| Team | W | | L | | T | W | | L | | T |
|---|---|---|---|---|---|---|---|---|---|---|
| Minnesota + | 3 | – | 0 | – | 0 | 13 | – | 0 | – | 0 |
| Michigan + | 2 | – | 0 | – | 0 | 10 | – | 0 | – | 0 |
| Chicago | 5 | – | 1 | – | 1 | 10 | – | 1 | – | 1 |
| Illinois | 3 | – | 1 | – | 1 | 9 | – | 2 | – | 1 |
| Northwestern | 1 | – | 2 | – | 0 | 8 | – | 2 | – | 0 |
| Purdue | 1 | – | 2 | – | 0 | 9 | – | 3 | – | 0 |
| Iowa | 0 | – | 3 | – | 0 | 7 | – | 4 | – | 0 |
| Wisconsin | 0 | – | 3 | – | 0 | 5 | – | 3 | – | 0 |
| Indiana | 0 | – | 3 | – | 0 | 6 | – | 4 | – | 0 |
+ – Conference co-champions

The 1904 Wisconsin Badgers football team represented the University of Wisconsin in the 1904 Western Conference football season. Led by Arthur Hale Curtis in his second and final season as head coach, the Badgers compiled an overall record of 5–3 with a mark of 0–3 in conference play, tying for seventh place in the Western Conference. The team's captain was James Bush.

== Schedule ==
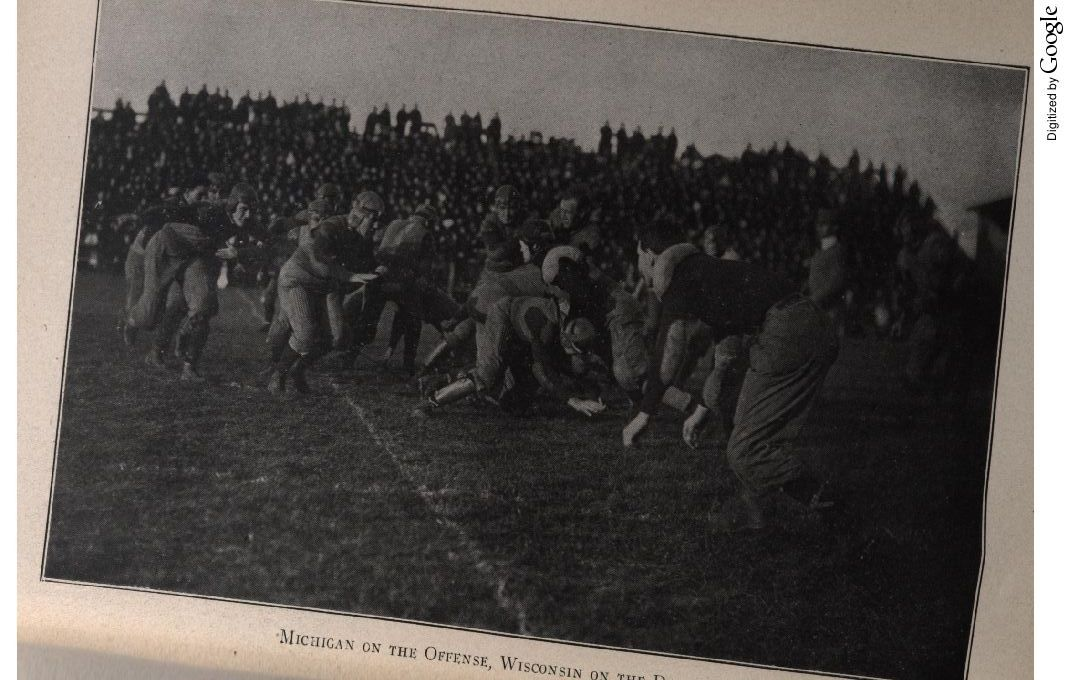
Michigan vs Wisconsin 1904

| Date | Opponent | Site | Result | Attendance | Source |
|---|---|---|---|---|---|
| October 1 | Fort Sheridan* | Randall Field; Madison, WI | W 45–0 | | |
| October 8 | Marquette* | Randall Field; Madison, WI | W 33–0 | | |
| October 15 | vs. Notre Dame* | Milwaukee, WI | W 58–0 | | |
| October 22 | Drake* | Randall Field; Madison, WI | W 82–0 | | |
| October 29 | Michigan | Randall Field; Madison, WI | L 0–28 | 11,000 | |
| November 5 | Beloit* | Randall Field; Madison, WI | W 36–0 | | |
| November 12 | at Minnesota | Northrop Field; Minneapolis, MN (rivalry) | L 0–28 | 18,000 | |
| November 24 | at Chicago | Marshall Field; Chicago, IL | L 11–18 | 15,000 | |
*Non-conference game
