= 1904 Northwestern Purple football team =

American college football season

1904 Northwestern Purple football
- Conference: Western Conference
- Record: 8–2 (1–2 Western)
- Head coach: Walter McCornack (2nd season)
- Captain: Harry Allen
- Home stadium: Sheppard Field

1904 Western Conference football standings
	Conf.					Overall
Team	W		L		T	W		L		T
Minnesota +	3	–	0	–	0	13	–	0	–	0
Michigan +	2	–	0	–	0	10	–	0	–	0
Chicago	5	–	1	–	1	10	–	1	–	1
Illinois	3	–	1	–	1	9	–	2	–	1
Northwestern	1	–	2	–	0	8	–	2	–	0
Purdue	1	–	2	–	0	9	–	3	–	0
Iowa	0	–	3	–	0	7	–	4	–	0
Wisconsin	0	–	3	–	0	5	–	3	–	0
Indiana	0	–	3	–	0	6	–	4	–	0
+ – Conference co-champions

The 1904 Northwestern Purple football team was an American football team that represented Northwestern University during the 1904 Western Conference football season. In its second season under head coach Walter McCornack, the team compiled an 8–2 record and finished in a tie for fifth place in the Western Conference. The team's sole losses were to Chicago and conference co-champion Minnesota.

== Schedule ==
Date	Opponent	Site	Result	Attendance	Source
September 24	Fort Sheridan*	Sheppard Field; Evanston, IL	W 17–0		
October 1	Northwestern College*	Sheppard Field; Evanston, IL	W 34–0		
October 5	North Division High School*	Sheppard Field; Evanston, IL	W 18–0		
October 8	Lombard*	Sheppard Field; Evanston, IL	W 55–0		
October 15	Beloit*	Sheppard Field; Evanston, IL	W 34–0		
October 22	at Chicago	Marshall Field; Chicago, IL	L 0–32	15,000	
October 29	DePauw*	Sheppard Field; Evanston, IL	W 45–0		
November 5	Oshkosh Normal*	Sheppard Field; Evanston, IL	W 97–0		
November 12	Illinois	Sheppard Field; Evanston, IL (rivalry)	W 12–6		
November 19	vs. Minnesota	Marshall Field; Chicago, IL	L 0–17	11,000	
*Non-conference game
