= 1904 Indiana Hoosiers football team =

American college football season

1904 Indiana Hoosiers football
- Conference: Western Conference
- Record: 6–4 (0–3 Western)
- Head coach: James H. Horne (7th season)
- Captain: Willis Coval
- Home stadium: Jordan Field

1904 Western Conference football standings
	Conf.					Overall
Team	W		L		T	W		L		T
Minnesota +	3	–	0	–	0	13	–	0	–	0
Michigan +	2	–	0	–	0	10	–	0	–	0
Chicago	5	–	1	–	1	10	–	1	–	1
Illinois	3	–	1	–	1	9	–	2	–	1
Northwestern	1	–	2	–	0	8	–	2	–	0
Purdue	1	–	2	–	0	9	–	3	–	0
Iowa	0	–	3	–	0	7	–	4	–	0
Wisconsin	0	–	3	–	0	5	–	3	–	0
Indiana	0	–	3	–	0	6	–	4	–	0
+ – Conference co-champions

The 1904 Indiana Hoosiers football team was an American football team that represented Indiana University Bloomington during the 1904 Western Conference football season. In their seventh season under head coach James H. Horne, the Hoosiers compiled a 6–4 record and were outscored by their opponents by a combined total of 116 to 84.

== Schedule ==
Date	Time	Opponent	Site	Result	Attendance	Source
September 24		Indiana alumni*	Jordan Field; Bloomington, IN	W 11–5		
September 28		Indiana Medical*	Jordan Field; Bloomington, IN	W 12–0		
October 1		at Chicago	Marshall Field; Chicago, IL	L 0–56		
October 8		Kentucky State College*	Jordan Field; Bloomington, IN (rivalry)	L 0–12		
October 15		at Illinois	Illinois Field; Champaign, IL (rivalry)	L 0–10		
October 22	3:30 p.m.	at Washington University*	World's Fair Stadium; St. Louis, MO	W 21–6		
October 29		Ohio State	Jordan Field; Bloomington, IN	W 8–0		
November 5		at Wabash*	Crawfordsville, IN	W 4–0		
November 12		vs. Purdue	Washington Park; Indianapolis, IN (rivalry)	L 0–27	15,000	
November 19		Kentucky University*	Jordan Field; Bloomington, IN	W 27–0		
*Non-conference game
