= Arthur Hale Curtis =

American football player and coach

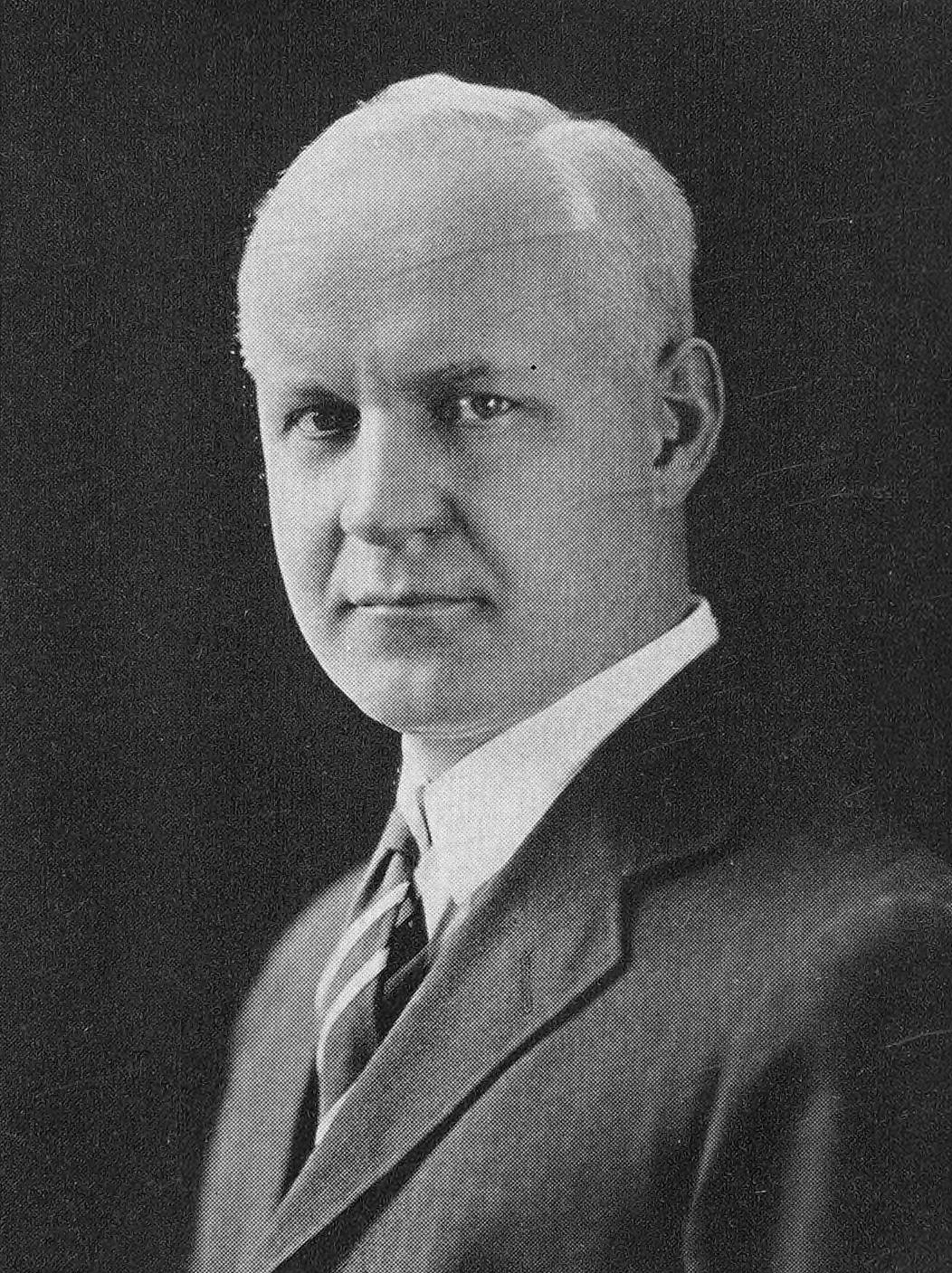

Biographical details
- Born: May 20, 1881; Portage, Wisconsin, U.S.
- Died: November 13, 1955 (aged 74); Evanston, Illinois, U.S.

Playing career
- 1898–1901: Wisconsin
- Position: Tackle

Coaching career (HC unless noted)
- 1902: Kansas
- 1903–1904: Wisconsin

Head coaching record
- Overall: 17–10–1

Accomplishments and honors

Awards
- Second-team All-American (1901)

Arthur Hale Curtis (May 20, 1881 – November 13, 1955) was an American football player, coach, and gynecologist. He served as the head coach at the University of Kansas in 1902 and at the University of Wisconsin–Madison from 1903 to 1904, compiling a career college football record of 17–10–1. Curtis earned an MD degree from Rush Medical College in 1905. He interned at Cook County Hospital and became a member of the Northwestern University Medical School faculty in 1910. Curtis was born on May 20, 1881, in Portage, Wisconsin. He died of November 13, 1955, at his apartment in the Homestead hotel, in Evanston, Illinois.

== Head coaching record ==
Year	Team	Overall	Conference	Standing	Bowl/playoffs
Kansas Jayhawks (Independent) (1902)
1902	Kansas	6–4			
Kansas:		6–4			
Wisconsin Badgers (Western Conference) (1903–1904)
1903	Wisconsin	6–3–1	0–3–1	8th	
1904	Wisconsin	5–3	0–3	T–7th	
Wisconsin:		11–6–1	0–6–1		
Total:		17–10–1			
