= 1904 Illinois Fighting Illini football team =

American college football season

1904 Illinois Fighting Illini football
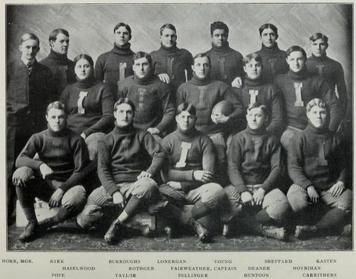
- Conference: Western Conference
- Record: 9–2–1 (3–1–1 Western)
- Head coach: Arthur R. Hall, Justa Lindgren, Fred Lowenthal & Clyde Mathews (1st season)
- Captain: Charles A. Fairweather
- Home stadium: Illinois Field

1904 Western Conference football standings
| | Conf. | | | | | Overall |
| Team | W | | L | | T | W | | L | | T |
|---|---|---|---|---|---|---|---|---|---|---|
| Minnesota + | 3 | – | 0 | – | 0 | 13 | – | 0 | – | 0 |
| Michigan + | 2 | – | 0 | – | 0 | 10 | – | 0 | – | 0 |
| Chicago | 5 | – | 1 | – | 1 | 10 | – | 1 | – | 1 |
| Illinois | 3 | – | 1 | – | 1 | 9 | – | 2 | – | 1 |
| Northwestern | 1 | – | 2 | – | 0 | 8 | – | 2 | – | 0 |
| Purdue | 1 | – | 2 | – | 0 | 9 | – | 3 | – | 0 |
| Iowa | 0 | – | 3 | – | 0 | 7 | – | 4 | – | 0 |
| Wisconsin | 0 | – | 3 | – | 0 | 5 | – | 3 | – | 0 |
| Indiana | 0 | – | 3 | – | 0 | 6 | – | 4 | – | 0 |
+ – Conference co-champions

The 1904 Illinois Fighting Illini football team was an American football team that represented the University of Illinois during the 1904 Western Conference football season. Coached by Arthur R. Hall, Justa Lindgren, Fred Lowenthal, and Clyde Mathews, the Illini compiled a 9–2–1 record and finished in fourth place in the Western Conference. Guard Charles A. Fairweather was the team captain.

== Schedule ==
| Date | Time | Opponent | Site | Result | Source |
|---|---|---|---|---|---|
| September 24 | | Northwestern College* | Illinois Field; Champaign, IL | W 10–0 | |
| September 28 | | Wabash* | Illinois Field; Champaign, IL | W 23–2 | |
| October 1 | | Knox* | Illinois Field; Champaign, IL | W 11–0 | |
| October 5 | | Chicago Physicians and Surgeons* | Illinois Field; Champaign, IL | W 26–0 | |
| October 8 | 2:30 p.m. | at Washington University* | World's Fair Stadium; St. Louis, MO | W 31–0 | |
| October 15 | | Indiana | Illinois Field; Champaign, IL (rivalry) | W 10–0 | |
| October 22 | | at Purdue | Stuart Field; Lafayette, IN | W 24–6 | |
| October 29 | | at Chicago | Marshall Field; Chicago, IL | T 6–6 | |
| November 5 | | at Ohio State | Ohio Field; Columbus, OH (rivalry) | W 46–0 | |
| November 12 | | at Northwestern | Evanston, IL (rivalry) | L 6–12 | |
| November 19 | | Iowa | Illinois Field; Champaign, IL | W 29–0 | |
| November 24 | | at Nebraska* | Antelope Field; Lincoln, NE | L 10–16 | |
*Non-conference game

== Awards and honors ==
- Claude Rothgeb, end

- Third-team selection by Walter Camp for the Collier's Weekly 1904 College Football All-America Team
- Selected as an All-American by Fred Lowenthal, coach of the University of Illinois

- John M. Haselwood, guard

- Selected as an All-American by Fred Lowenthal
