= Frederick A. Speik =

American football player and coach (1882–1940)

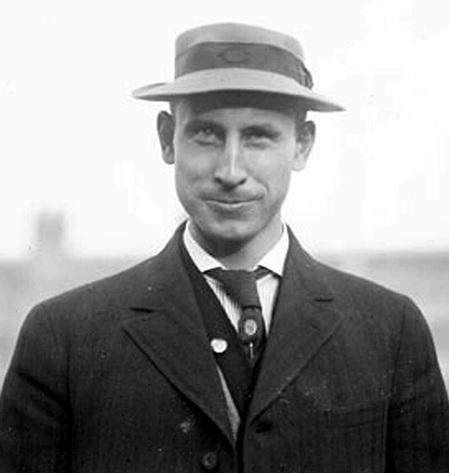
- Fred Speik, c. 1909

Biographical details
- Born: January 26, 1882; Stockton, California, U.S.
- Died: June 30, 1940 (aged 58); South Pasadena, California, U.S.

Playing career
- 1901–1904: Chicago
- Position: End

Coaching career (HC unless noted)
- 1905–1907: Chicago (assistant)
- 1908–1909: Purdue

Head coaching record
- Overall: 6–8

Accomplishments and honors

Awards
- Consensus All-American (1904); University of Chicago Athletics Hall of Fame

Frederick Adolph Speik (January 26, 1882 – June 30, 1940) was an American college football player and coach. He played for the University of Chicago from 1901 to 1904 and was selected as a first-team All-American in 1904. He was the head football coach at Purdue University from 1908 to 1909, compiling a record of 6–8.

== Biography ==
=== Early years ===
Speik was born in Stockton, California in 1882. He was the son of a manufacturer and grocer. Speik came to Chicago for his education and attended the Northwest Division High School.

Speik enrolled at the University of Chicago in 1901 and played four years of college football there under legendary coach Amos Alonzo Stagg. He also played for Chicago's water polo and track teams. As a football player, he played at the left end position, was captain of the 1904 team, and became a close friend of Coach Stagg. The Chicago Daily Tribune called him "one of the best ends ever developed at Chicago." At the end of the 1904 season, Speik was selected as a first-team All-American by Caspar Whitney in Outing magazine

In 2017 he was inducted into the University of Chicago Athletics Hall of Fame.

=== Football coach and medical student ===
After graduating from Chicago in 1905, Speik served as an assistant football coach under head coach Stagg. Speik attended Rush Medical College while working as an assistant football coach. He graduated from medical school in 1907.

In 1908, Speik accepted the job as the head coach of the Purdue Boilermakers football team and served there in the 1908 and 1909 college football seasons. He compiled a 6–8 record in two years at Purdue and resigned his position as head coach on October 23, 1909. At the time of his resignation, the Chicago Daily Tribune reported: "Since Speik has been in charge at the Boilermaker institution Purdue has not won a game of note, and his ability as an instructor did not meet the expectations of members of the association, who assert that Speik had splendid material from which to pick an eleven."

=== Family ===
In June 1909, Speik married Edith Charlotte Lawton in Chicago. The couple had four children, Robert Lawton Speik, Madeleine Lawton (Speik) Lynden, Charlotte Ann Speik and Elizabeth Jane Speik.

=== Medical career ===
After retiring from football, Speik moved to California and became a successful physician and surgeon. He was on the staff of the Los Angeles County Hospital and the Pasadena Hospital and was a professor of medicine at the University of Southern California Medical School from 1915 to 1919. In 1917, he was Chairman of the Los Angeles County Medical Association's Committee on the County Hospital. The family lived on Fair Oaks Avenue in South Pasadena, California. He was active in South Pasadena civic and political affairs. In 1938, he received a patent for an ornamental spoon holder.

=== Death ===
In June 1940, Speik's body was discovered hanging by a heavy cord attached to one of the machines at a surgical supply factory in South Pasadena. His death was ruled a suicide. He was survived by his wife and four children.

== Head coaching record ==
Year	Team	Overall	Conference	Standing	Bowl/playoffs
Purdue Boilermakers (Western Conference) (1908–1909)
1908	Purdue	4–3	1–3	T–4th	
1909	Purdue	2–5	0–4	8th	
Purdue:		6–8	1–7		
Total:		6–8			
