= Walter Eckersall =

American football player, official, and sportswriter (1883–1930)

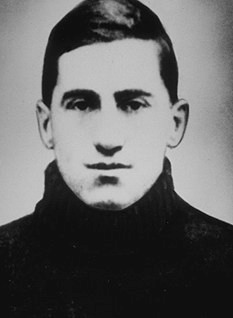
- circa 1905

Profile
- Position: Quarterback

Personal information
- Born: June 17, 1883; Chicago, Illinois, U.S.
- Died: March 24, 1930 (aged 46); Chicago, Illinois, U.S.
- Listed height: 5 ft 7 in (1.70 m)
- Listed weight: 141 lb (64 kg)

Career information
- College: Chicago (1903–1906)

Awards and highlights
- National champion (1905); 3× Consensus All-American (1904, 1905, 1906); 4× First-team All-Western (1903−1906); Camp All-time All-America team; Yost All-time All-America team; Thorpe All-time All-America team; FWAA College Football All-Time Team (1869–1919)

Walter Herbert "Eckie" Eckersall (June 17, 1883 – March 24, 1930) was an American college football player, official, and sportswriter for the Chicago Tribune.

He played for the Maroons of the University of Chicago, and was elected to the College Football Hall of Fame in 1951. Eckersall was selected as the quarterback for Walter Camp's "All-Time All-America Team" honoring the greatest college football players during the sport's formative years. He was selected to Camp's All-American teams in 1904, 1905, and 1906.

== Early life ==
Walter Eckersall was born in Chicago on June 17, 1883. He grew up in its Woodlawn neighborhood just south of the University of Chicago. His talent emerged at Hyde Park High School, where he dashed 100 yards (91 m) in 10.0 seconds, an Illinois record for 25 years, and excelled on the football field. In 1902, he quarterbacked Hyde Park to an undefeated season and then led the squad to a 105–0 trouncing of Brooklyn Polytechnic at Marshall Field on December 5 to claim the unofficial national high school football championship.

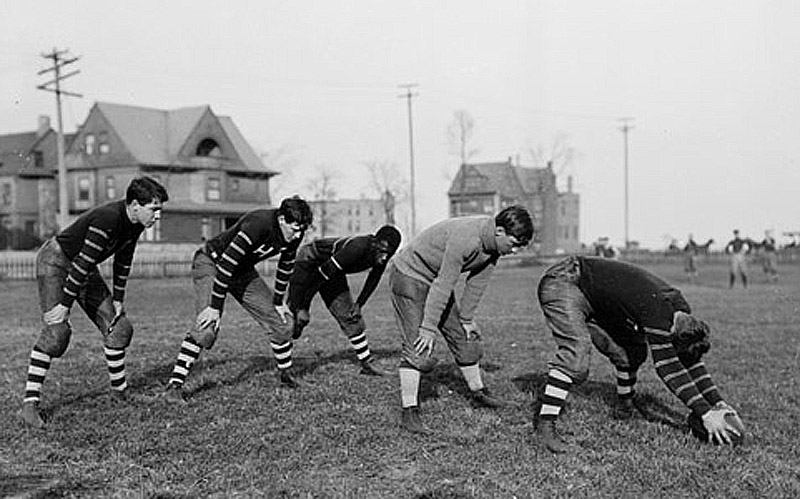
1902 Hyde Park football

Eckersall later wrote about his years at Hyde Park in a column picked up for national syndication in 1918. Much of the article was about African American player and World War I veteran Lieutenant Samuel Ransom.

Eckersall was highly recruited out of high school by both Fielding Yost of Michigan and Amos Alonzo Stagg of Chicago. Stagg resorted to chicanery, snatching Eckersall off a train platform to keep him from attending a recruitment rendezvous arranged by Michigan coaches in Ann Arbor in 1903.

== College career ==
In Eckersall, Stagg saw the promise of "a selfless performer, marked by complete dedication" to victory. During his career, Eckersall led Chicago to a 25–2–1 (.911) record, outscoring their opponents 856–66. The two losses were to Michigan in 1904 and to Minnesota in 1906. The tie was a 6–6 stalemate with Illinois in 1904.

=== 1905 ===
In 1905, the junior quarterback led the Maroons to a national championship. In the final game of the season on Thursday, November 30, Chicago and Michigan met in a battle of undefeated Western Conference powerhouses in front of 27,000 spectators at Chicago's Marshall Field. It was at that time the largest crowd to view a football game in the city. Michigan was 12–0-0 with no points allowed and had a 56-game undefeated streak on the line while Chicago was 10–0-0 and had allowed only five points all season.

The game was a punting duel between Eckersall and Michigan's John Garrels. It was scoreless until early in the third quarter when a Michigan punt and Chicago penalty pinned Chicago inside its own 10-yard line. On third down as Eckersall attempted to punt, he encountered a fearsome rush but evaded the Michigan tacklers and was able to scramble to the 22-yard line and a first down.

After three more first downs, the drive stalled and Chicago was forced to punt again. Eckersall's booming punt carried into the end zone where it was caught by Michigan's William Dennison Clark, who attempted to run the ball out. He advanced the ball forward to the one-yard line but was hit hard by Art Badenoch and then was brought back inside his own end zone by Mark Catlin for a two-point safety. Under the rules of the time, forward progress was not credited and a ball carrier could be carried backwards or forwards until he was down. The rest of the third and fourth quarters continued as a defensive stalemate. Chicago's 2–0 victory snapped Michigan's 56-game unbeaten streak and gave Chicago the national championship for 1905. It is one of the first games identified as a "Game of the Century."

Clark was generally blamed for the Michigan loss, and in 1932 he shot himself through the heart. In a suicide note to his wife he reportedly expressed the hope that his "final play" would be of some benefit in atoning for his error at Marshall Field.

== Later life ==
Team captains of Brown and Washington State with referee Eckersall prior to Rose Bowl kickoff in Pasadena on January 1, 1916

After his playing days, Eckersall remained a prominent figure in football. He had a successful dual career as a sportswriter for the Chicago Tribune and as a game official. As a referee, Eckersall was considered one of the best and officiated at many high-profile games. Highly regarded as an authority on football, he selected the Chicago Tribune's all star team; his "All Western" eleven carried prestige.

Eckersall is also a footnote in the story of Knute Rockne and the history of Notre Dame because of his presence at many of their games. Eckersall was an idol of Rockne, who grew up in Chicago and watched Eckersall play in high school and in college. Rockne said that "The first time I learned a football was not only something to kick, but something to think with, was when I saw a great football player in action."

=== Death ===
Eckersall's alcoholism and carousing often contradicted Stagg's description of football as a builder of moral character. Stagg gradually distanced himself from his greatest player, especially when Eckersall reneged on a $20 debt and was later featured in a national ad campaign for cigarettes—a habit Stagg regarded as sinful. In March 1930, when Eckersall was hospitalized for illnesses associated with his hard living, Stagg came to his bedside with the firm advice to "turn over a new leaf." Eckersall promised his old coach that he would; however, the former football star died of cirrhosis of the liver and pneumonia on March 24 at the age of 46. The cause of death was reported as a heart attack in the Chicago Tribune the next day.

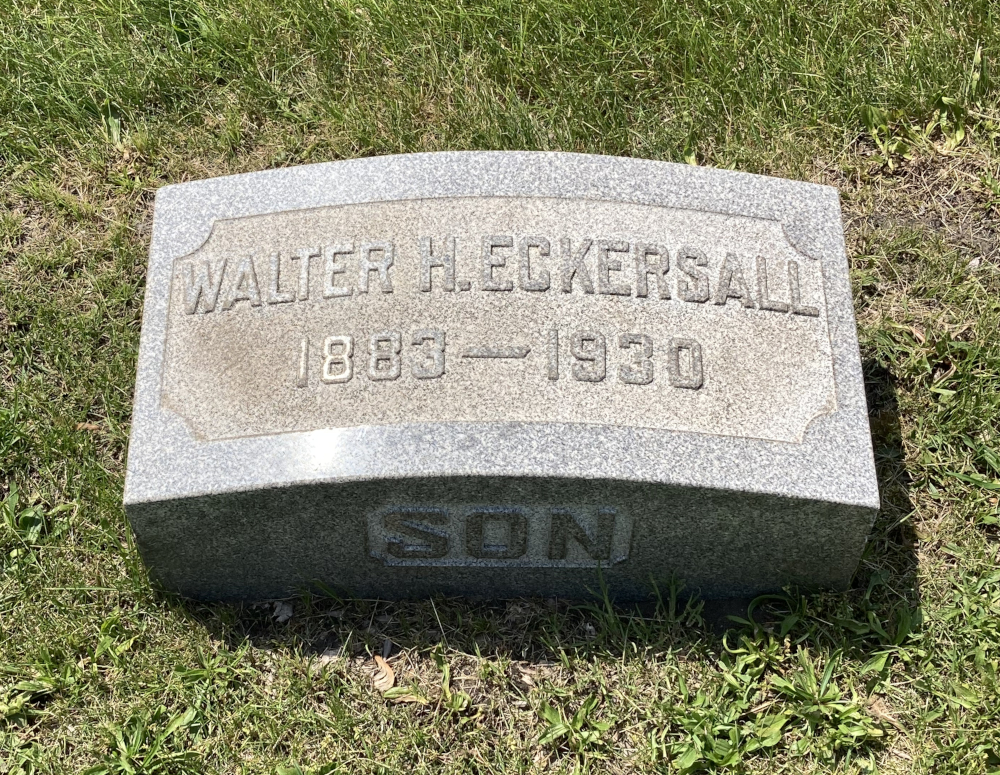
Eckersall's grave at Oak Woods Cemetery

Eckersall's funeral on March 27 at Holy Cross Church, five blocks south of the university, was attended by fifteen hundred people. At 65th & Maryland, a parish church was built on the site where he first played sandlot football as a child. (41.777°N 87.6043°W) He was buried at nearby Oak Woods Cemetery next to his parents.

=== Legacy ===
The Chicago Public Schools constructed a sporting facility in South Chicago at 2423 East 82nd Street named Walter Eckersall Stadium in 1949. (41.745°N 87.565°W)

In 1969, in honor of the centennial of collegiate football, the Football Writers Association of America named two "College Football All-Time Teams" of eleven players — an "early" team consisting of players who played prior to 1920, and a "modern" team who played in 1920 and after. Eckersall was chosen as quarterback of the pre-1920 squad.

He is the subject of Eckie: Walter Eckersall and the Rise of Chicago Sports, a book written by Chris Serb and released by the University of Nebraska Press in October 2025.
