= 1903 Western Conference football season =

- Sport: Football
- Number of teams: 9
- Co-champions: Minnesota, Michigan

Football seasons
- ← 1902 1904 →

1903 Western Conference football standings
	Conf.					Overall
Team	W		L		T	W		L		T
Minnesota +	3	–	0	–	1	14	–	0	–	1
Michigan +	3	–	0	–	1	11	–	0	–	1
Northwestern +	1	–	0	–	2	10	–	1	–	3
Chicago	4	–	1	–	1	12	–	2	–	1
Iowa	1	–	1	–	0	9	–	2	–	0
Indiana	1	–	2	–	0	4	–	4	–	0
Illinois	1	–	5	–	0	8	–	6	–	0
Wisconsin	0	–	3	–	1	6	–	3	–	1
Purdue	0	–	2	–	0	4	–	2	–	0
+ – Conference co-champions

The 1903 Western Conference football season was the eighth season of college football played by the member schools of the Western Conference (later known as the Big Ten Conference) and was a part of the 1903 college football season.

Michigan and Minnesota were conference co-champions, both compiling undefeated seasons with the exception of a 6-6 tie when the two teams played each other. The tie between Michigan and Minnesota gave rise to the tradition of the two teams' playing for the Little Brown Jug. In the chaos that ensued when the Minnesota crowd rushed onto the field at the end of the game, the Wolverines left their water jug behind. The next day, custodian Oscar Munson brought the jug to Minnesota's athletic director; they painted the jug brown and wrote on it, "Michigan Jug – Captured by Oscar, October 31, 1903." According to legend, Yost sent a letter asking for the jug to be returned, and Cooke wrote in response: "We have your little brown jug; if you want it, you'll have to win it." Yost returned with his team in 1909 to reclaim the jug, and the two teams have awarded the jug to the winner of their annual rivalry game.

Michigan compiled an 11–0–1 and outscored opponents 565 to 6, and Minnesota went 14-0-1 record and outscored opponents 656 to 12. All of Michigan's victories were shutouts, and 13 of Minnesota's victories were shutouts. The 1903 Michigan team was the third of Yost's "Point-a-Minute" teams and has been recognized retrospectively as a co-national champion (along with Princeton) by the National Championship Foundation. Michigan's high scorer was fullback Tom Hammond with 163 points.

The remainder of Purdue University's season was canceled following the death of 14 players in the disastrous Purdue Wreck, a train collision that occurred on October 31, 1903, in Indianapolis. The Boilermakers were on their way to the annual Indiana–Purdue football rivalry game to be played at Washington Park. Purdue's season ended at 4–2 (0–2).

== Season overview ==
=== Results and team statistics ===
Conf. Rank	Team	Head coach	Overall record	Conf. record	PPG	PAG
1 (tie)	Minnesota	Henry L. Williams	14-0-1	3-0-1	41.2	0.8
1 (tie)	Michigan	Fielding H. Yost	11–0–1	3–0–1	47.1	0.5
3	Northwestern	Walter McCornack	10–1–3	1–0–2	16.4	4.8
4	Chicago	Amos A. Stagg	12–2–1	4–1–1	27.5	4.1
5	Iowa	John Chalmers	9–2	1–1	15.5	9.3
6	Indiana	James H. Horne	4–4	1–2	18.5	15.5
7	Illinois	G. W. Woodruff	8–6	1–5	25.1	8.4
8	Wisconsin	Arthur Curtis	6–3–1	0–3–1	30.5	6.7
9	Purdue	Oliver Cutts	4–2	0–2	14.5	8.0

Key

PPG = Average of points scored per game
PAG = Average of points allowed per game

=== Bowl games ===
No Western Conference schools participated in any bowl games during the 1903 season.

== Awards and honors ==
=== All-Western players ===
Thirteen players were chosen as first-team players on at least four of the 1903 All-Western college football teams named by the following eight selectors: Billy Mac aggregate (BMA), a team selected by aggregating the choices made by ten critics in St. Paul, Minneapolis, Milwaukee, Chicago and Detroit, Billy Mac (BM) in The St. Paul Globe Chicago Inter-Ocean (CIO), Chicago Record-Herald (CRH), Chicago Tribune (CT), Fred Lowenthal (FL), former star football player at University of Illinois, The Minneapolis Journal (MJ), and Walter Camp (WC). (Players unanimously chosen by all eight selectors are listed in bold.)

- Curtis Redden, end, Michigan (BMA, CIO, CRH, CT, FL, MJ, WC)
- Allen Abbott, end, Wisconsin (BMA, BM, CIO, CRH, CT)
- Edward L. Rogers, end, Minnesota (BMA, BM, FL, MJ, WC)
- **Joe Maddock**, tackle, Michigan (BMA, BM, CIO, CRH, CT, FL, MJ, WC)
- **Fred Schacht**, tackle, Minnesota (BMA, BM, CIO, CRH, CT, FL, MJ, WC)
- Robert Philips, guard, Northwestern (BMA, CIO, CRH, WC)
- Wilson Berthke, guard, Wisconsin (BMA, BM, FL, MJ, WC)
- Moses Land Strathern, center, Minnesota (BMA, BM, CIO, CRH, FL, MJ, WC)
- Walter Eckersall, quarterback, Chicago (BMA, CIO, CT, MJ)
- Sigmund Harris, quarterback, Minnesota (BM, CRH, FL, WC)
- **Willie Heston**, halfback, Michigan (BMA, BM, CIO, CRH, CT, FL, MJ, WC)
- James B. Irsfield, halfback, Minnesota (BMA, CT, FL, WC)
- Louis J. Salmon, fullback, Notre Dame (BMA, BM, CIO, CT, MJ, WC)

=== All-Americans ===
The following players were selected as first-team players by at least one selector for the 1903 College Football All-America Team. (Consensus first-team selections designated in bold.)

- Fred Schacht, tackle, Minnesota (Caspar Whitney [CW])
- Joe Maddock, tackle, Michigan (Fielding H. Yost [FY], San Antonio Daily Light [SA])
- Sigmund Harris, quarterback, Minnesota (FY)
- **Willie Heston**, halfback, Michigan (Walter Camp, CW, FY, SA)
