= 1903 Minnesota Golden Gophers football team =

American college football season

1903 Minnesota Golden Gophers football

Western Conference co-champion
- Conference: Western Conference
- Record: 14–0–1 (3–0–1 Western)
- Head coach: Henry L. Williams (4th season)
- Captain: Eddie Rogers
- Home stadium: Northrop Field

1903 Western Conference football standings
	Conf.					Overall
Team	W		L		T	W		L		T
Minnesota +	3	–	0	–	1	14	–	0	–	1
Michigan +	3	–	0	–	1	11	–	0	–	1
Northwestern +	1	–	0	–	2	10	–	1	–	3
Chicago	4	–	1	–	1	12	–	2	–	1
Iowa	1	–	1	–	0	9	–	2	–	0
Indiana	1	–	2	–	0	4	–	4	–	0
Illinois	1	–	5	–	0	8	–	6	–	0
Wisconsin	0	–	3	–	1	6	–	3	–	1
Purdue	0	–	2	–	0	4	–	2	–	0
+ – Conference co-champions

The 1903 Minnesota Golden Gophers football team represented the University of Minnesota in the 1903 college football season. In their fourth year under head coach Henry L. Williams, the Golden Gophers compiled a 14–0–1 record (3–0–1 against Western Conference opponents), shut out 13 of their 15 opponents, and outscored all opponents by a combined total of 656 to 12. The team finished the season in a tie with Michigan for the Western Conference co-championship. When Minnesota and Michigan met, the teams played to a tie in a game that gave rise the Little Brown Jug trophy.

Four Minnesota players were recognized on the 1903 College Football All-America Team. Quarterback Sigmund Harris received first-team honors from Fielding H. Yost and third-team honors from Walter Camp. Tackle Fred Schacht received first-team honors from Caspar Whitney and second-team honors from Camp and Yost. Center Moses Strathern received second-team honors from Camp. And, end Eddie Rogers received third-team honors from Camp.

In addition, nine Gophers were honored on the 1903 All-Western college football team: quarterback Sigmund Harris (BM-1, CIO-2, CRH, FL-1, MJ-2, WC); halfbacks James B. Irsfield (BMA, CIO-2, CT, FL-1, MJ-2, WC) and Otto Nelson Davies (BM-2); fullback Earl Current (BM-2); end Edward L. Rogers (BMA, BM-1, CIO-2, FL-1, MJ-1, WC); tackle Fred Schacht (BMA, BM-1, CIO-1, CRH, CT, FL-1, MJ-1, WC); guards Walton Willard Thorp (BM-1, CIO-2, CT, MJ-1) and John B. Warren (BM-2, MJ-2); and center Moses Strathern (BMA, BM-1, CIO-1, CRH, FL-1, MJ-1, WC).

== Schedule ==
Date	Opponent	Site	Result	Attendance	Source
September 19	Minneapolis Central High*	Northrop Field; Minneapolis, MN	W 21–6	3,000	
September 19	Saint Paul Central High School*	Northrop Field; Minneapolis, MN	W 36–0	3,000	
September 23	Minneapolis East High*	Northrop Field; Minneapolis, MN	W 37–0		
September 26	Carleton*	Northrop Field; Minneapolis, MN	W 29–0		
September 30	Macalester*	Northrop Field; Minneapolis, MN	W 112–0		
October 3	Grinnell*	Northrop Field; Minneapolis, MN	W 39–0		
October 7	Hamline*	Northrop Field; Minneapolis, MN	W 65–0		
October 10	Iowa State*	Northrop Field; Minneapolis, MN	W 46–0		
October 17	Iowa	Northrop Field; Minneapolis, MN (rivalry)	W 75–0	6,000	
October 24	Beloit*	Northrop Field; Minneapolis, MN	W 46–0		
October 31	Michigan	Northrop Field; Minneapolis, MN (Little Brown Jug)	T 6–6	20,000–30,000	
November 2	at North Dakota Agricultural*	Fargo, ND	W 11–0		
November 7	at Lawrence*	Appleton, WI	W 46–0		
November 14	at Illinois	Champaign, IL	W 32–0		
November 26	at Wisconsin	Randall Field; Madison, WI (rivalry)	W 17–0	< 3,500	
*Non-conference game

== Game summaries ==
=== Michigan ===
The eighth game of the season matched Minnesota against Michigan in a game played at Northrop Field in Minneapolis, Minnesota. The New York Times reported that the match, "one of the most desperate football games seen in the West in years," was witnessed by "fully 30,000 spectators." The game ended in a 6–6 tie, the first time in the Yost era that Michigan had not achieved a victory. During the first half, Minnesota outgained Michigan 155 yards to 60 yards. The Michigan defense held, and the first half ended in a scoreless tie.

With 15 minutes remaining in the game, Michigan sustained a 65-yard drive culminating with a touchdown by right tackle Joe Maddock. On the drive that followed, the Michigan line was "unable to sustain Schacht's fierce line smashes," and Minnesota tied the game with a touchdown run by its fullback, Boeckmann, and Rogers kicked the point after touchdown. Although approximately two minutes remained in the game, Minnesota fans surged onto the field, and the game had to be ended early. The Detroit Free Press described the scene as follows:

"Time was not up by a few minutes, but the crowd surged onto the field and time was called, as it would have been impossible to have cleared the gridiron in time to resume play before daylight had faded entirely away."

When the Michigan team returned to Ann Arbor on November 1, the players were greeted by a crowd of 5,000 singing and yelling at the depot. The crowd attached ropes to a bus and towed the team to campus while continuing with organized songs and yells. At a rally near the law building, Willie Heston told the crowd that the Minnesota players were "the roughest lot of sluggers I ever went up against." Heston's right eye was nearly swollen shut, and his nose bore "marks of terrific smashes." Joe Maddock added, "I don't know how many times I was hit and kicked, but I think I got at least twenty blows on the back of my neck." The Michigan Alumnus complained about "the unsportsmanlike spirit" manifested by some Minnesota players and opined that the Minnesota fans who surged onto the field had responded to "an impulse which does more credit to their enthusiasm than their love of fair play." The Detroit Free Press condemned "the muckerish tactics of the crowd and the pugilistic efforts of the Gophers." Several in attendance reported that Minnesota assistant coach Pudge Heffelfinger had been heard yelling from the sidelines, "Kill off Heston in the first ten minutes, or you'll lose." The crowd reportedly picked up the comment and responded with the yell, "Kill off Heston." The game's umpire, Henry Clark, was selected by Minnesota, and he came under heavy criticism from Michigan loyalists for failing to call Minnesota for its rough play.

The Minnesota game generated gross gate receipts of $30,933.50. After deducting expenses, Michigan's share was $13,000. Yost defended his team's performance upon his return to Ann Arbor. Pulling a criss-crossed chart from his pocket, Yost walked through the progress of the game with reporters. Even though Minnesota outgained Michigan in the first half, Yost said:

"Why, they never had the ball inside our 30-yard line but once during the first half, and it was just inside at that time. The goal was never in danger because our boys played a scientific defensive game and kept the ball in the air part of the time, where it belonged. We had good headwork as well as beef, and I do not think it is fair to Michigan to say that she was outplayed in the first half. The touchdown the Minnesota boys made was made after dark, when nobody could see the ball, and of course that prevented us from stopping them. Also, the field was crowned. I am confident, however, that we have the better team. That man Gooding and Heston played a wonderful game, and all the boys did, for that matter. I have no fault to find with anyone."

==== Little Brown Jug ====
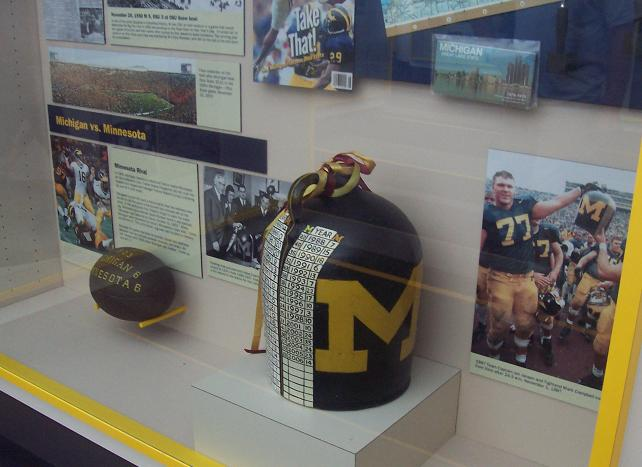
Replica of the Little Brown Jug on display in Ann Arbor, Michigan in 2007. The real Jug is kept in storage.

The 1903 game against Minnesota also gave rise to the tradition of the two teams playing for the Little Brown Jug. When the Michigan team arrived in Minneapolis, Yost reportedly instructed student manager Thomas B. Roberts to purchase a water jug. Roberts purchased a five-gallon jug for 30¢ from a local variety store. In the chaos that ensued when the Minnesota crowd rushed onto the field, the Wolverines left the jug behind. Thomas Roberts, writing in 1956, stated that the jug had served its purpose, so he intentionally left it sitting on the field. The next day, custodian Oscar Munson brought the jug to L. J. Cooke, head of the Minnesota athletics department. Cooke and Munson painted the jug brown and wrote on it, "Michigan Jug – Captured by Oscar, October 31, 1903." According to legend, Yost sent a letter asking for the jug to be returned, and Cooke wrote in response: "We have your little brown jug; if you want it, you'll have to win it." Yost returned with his team in 1909 to reclaim the jug, and the two teams have awarded the jug to the winner of their annual rivalry game.
