= 1903 Indiana Hoosiers football team =

American college football season

1903 Indiana Hoosiers football
- Conference: Western Conference
- Record: 4–4 (1–2 Western)
- Head coach: James H. Horne (6th season)
- Captain: Zora Clevenger
- Home stadium: Jordan Field

1903 Western Conference football standings
	Conf.					Overall
Team	W		L		T	W		L		T
Minnesota +	3	–	0	–	1	14	–	0	–	1
Michigan +	3	–	0	–	1	11	–	0	–	1
Northwestern +	1	–	0	–	2	10	–	1	–	3
Chicago	4	–	1	–	1	12	–	2	–	1
Iowa	1	–	1	–	0	9	–	2	–	0
Indiana	1	–	2	–	0	4	–	4	–	0
Illinois	1	–	5	–	0	8	–	6	–	0
Wisconsin	0	–	3	–	1	6	–	3	–	1
Purdue	0	–	2	–	0	4	–	2	–	0
+ – Conference co-champions

The 1903 Indiana Hoosiers football team was an American football team that represented Indiana University Bloomington during the 1903 college football season. In their sixth season under head coach James H. Horne, the Hoosiers compiled a 4–4 record and were outscored by their opponents by a combined total of 148 to 124.

== Schedule ==
Date	Opponent	Site	Result	Source
September 26	Wabash*	Jordan Field; Bloomington, IN	L 0–5	
October 3	at Chicago	Marshall Field; Chicago, IL	L 0–34	
October 10	Earlham*	Jordan Field; Bloomington, IN	W 39–0	
October 17	at Michigan	Regents Field; Ann Arbor, MI	L 0–51	
October 31	vs. Purdue	Washington Park; Indianapolis, IN	Cancelled (see Purdue Wreck)	
November 7	Illinois	Jordan Field; Bloomington, IN (rivalry)	W 17–0	
November 14	DePauw*	Jordan Field; Bloomington, IN	W 70–0	
November 21	at Kentucky University*	Lexington, KY	L 5–18	
November 28	at Ohio State	Ohio Field; Columbus, OH	W 17–16	
*Non-conference game

== Personnel ==
=== Roster ===
Name	Personnel	Year	Source
Zora G. Clevenger		Senior	
Joseph M. Artman			
Allen L. Brenner			
Walter E. Hottel		Junior	

=== Staffing ===
- James H. Horne, coach
