= 1903 Illinois Fighting Illini football team =

American college football season

1903 Illinois Fighting Illini football
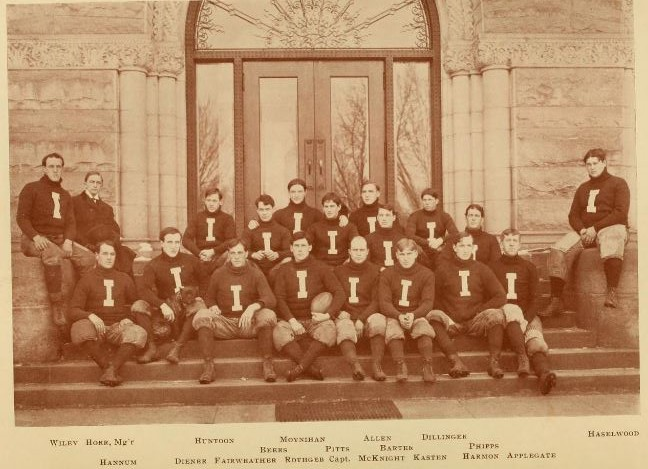
- Conference: Western Conference
- Record: 8–6 (1–5 Western)
- Head coach: George Woodruff (1st season)
- Captain: Claude Rothgeb
- Home stadium: Illinois Field

1903 Western Conference football standings
	Conf.					Overall
Team	W		L		T	W		L		T
Minnesota +	3	–	0	–	1	14	–	0	–	1
Michigan +	3	–	0	–	1	11	–	0	–	1
Northwestern +	1	–	0	–	2	10	–	1	–	3
Chicago	4	–	1	–	1	12	–	2	–	1
Iowa	1	–	1	–	0	9	–	2	–	0
Indiana	1	–	2	–	0	4	–	4	–	0
Illinois	1	–	5	–	0	8	–	6	–	0
Wisconsin	0	–	3	–	1	6	–	3	–	1
Purdue	0	–	2	–	0	4	–	2	–	0
+ – Conference co-champions

The 1903 Illinois Fighting Illini football team was an American football team that represented the University of Illinois during the 1903 college football season. In their first season under head coach George Washington Woodruff, the Illini compiled an 8–6 record and finished in seventh place in the Western Conference. Guard/end Claude Rothgeb was the team captain.

== Schedule ==
Date	Opponent	Site	Result	Source
September 19	Englewood High School	Illinois Field; Champaign, IL	W 45–5	
September 26	Lombard	Illinois Field; Champaign, IL	W 43–0	
September 30	Kirksville Osteopaths	Illinois Field; Champaign, IL	W 36–0	
October 3	Knox	Illinois Field; Champaign, IL	W 29–5	
October 7	Chicago Physicians and Surgeons	Illinois Field; Champaign, IL	W 40–0	
October 10	Rush Medical	Illinois Field; Champaign, IL	W 64–0	
October 14	Chicago Dental	Illinois Field; Champaign, IL	W 54–0	
October 17	at Purdue	Stuart Field; Lafayette, IN (rivalry)	W 24–0	
October 24	at Chicago	Marshall Field; Chicago, IL	L 6–18	
October 31	Northwestern	Illinois Field; Champaign, IL (rivalry)	L 11–12	
November 6	at Indiana	Jordan Field; Bloomington, IN (rivalry)	L 0–17	
November 14	Minnesota	Illinois Field; Champaign, IL	L 0–32	
November 21	at Iowa	Iowa Field; Iowa City, IA	L 0–12	
November 26	at Nebraska	Antelope Field; Lincoln, NE	L 0–16	
