= 1903 Iowa Hawkeyes football team =

American college football season

1903 Iowa Hawkeyes football

Iowa state champion
- Conference: Western Conference
- Record: 9–2 (1–1 Western)
- Head coach: John Chalmers (1st season)
- Captain: George Harris Coulthard
- Home stadium: Iowa Field

1903 Western Conference football standings
	Conf.					Overall
Team	W		L		T	W		L		T
Minnesota +	3	–	0	–	1	14	–	0	–	1
Michigan +	3	–	0	–	1	11	–	0	–	1
Northwestern +	1	–	0	–	2	10	–	1	–	3
Chicago	4	–	1	–	1	12	–	2	–	1
Iowa	1	–	1	–	0	9	–	2	–	0
Indiana	1	–	2	–	0	4	–	4	–	0
Illinois	1	–	5	–	0	8	–	6	–	0
Wisconsin	0	–	3	–	1	6	–	3	–	1
Purdue	0	–	2	–	0	4	–	2	–	0
+ – Conference co-champions

The 1903 Iowa Hawkeyes football team was an American football team that represented the State University of Iowa ("S.U.I."), now commonly known as the University of Iowa, as a member of the Western Conference during the 1903 Western Conference football season. In their first year under head coach John Chalmers, the Hawkeyes compiled a 9–2 record (1–1 in conference games), finished fifth in the Western Conference, shut out six of eleven opponents, and outscored all opponents by a total of 171 to 102. The Hawkeyes played only two conference games: a 75–0 loss to Minnesota; and a 12–0 victory over Illinois. The 75-point margin of victory for Minnesota remains the largest in the history of the Iowa–Minnesota football rivalry.

== Background ==
With victories over six Iowa teams (Cornell (IA), Coe, Iowa State Normal, Drake, Grinnell, and Simpson), the Hawkeyes were recognized as the Iowa state football champion. End George Harris Coulthard was the team captain. The team played its home games at Iowa Field in Iowa City, Iowa.

== Schedule ==
Date	Time	Opponent	Site	Result	Attendance	Source
September 27		Cornell (IA)*	Iowa Field; Iowa City, IA	W 6–0		
September 30		Coe*	Iowa Field; Iowa City, IA	W 16–0		
October 3		Iowa State Normal*	Iowa Field; Iowa City, IA	W 29–0		
October 10		Drake*	Iowa Field; Iowa City, IA	W 22–6		
October 17		at Minnesota	Northrop Field; Minneapolis, MN (rivalry)	L 0–75	6,000	
October 24		at Grinnell*	Grinnell, IA	W 17–0		
October 31		Nebraska*	Iowa Field; Iowa City, IA (rivalry)	L 6–17		
November 6		Simpson*	Iowa Field; Iowa City, IA	W 35–2		
November 14		at Missouri*	Rollins Field; Columbia, MO	W 16–0		
November 21		Illinois	Iowa Field; Iowa City, IA	W 12–0		
November 26	3:30 p.m.	at Washington University*	League Park; St. Louis, MO	W 12–2		
*Non-conference game

== Players ==
- George Allen, halfback
- William Atkinson, guard
- Fred Buckley, fullback/tackle
- Roy Buckley, tackle
- George Harris Coulthard, end and captain
- Louis Donovan, guard
- Frank Gibbs, fullback
- Dwight Griffith, end/quarterback
- Albert Johnston (or Johnson), center
- Nyle Jones, halfback
- Earle McGowan (sometimes spelled McGowen), guard/tackle
- Frederick Schwinn (or Schwin), guard
- Charles Terry
- Glen Wilkins
