= 1903 Chicago Maroons football team =

American college football season

1903 Chicago Maroons football
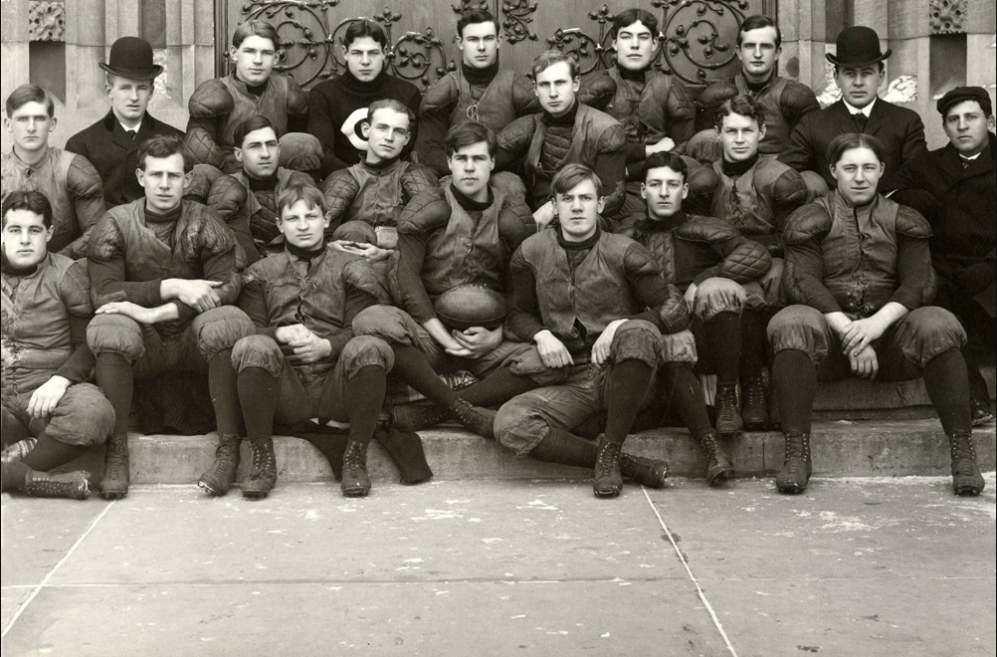
- Conference: Western Conference
- Record: 12–2–1 (4–1–1 Western)
- Head coach: Amos Alonzo Stagg (12th season)
- Captain: Shorty Ellsworth
- Home stadium: Marshall Field

1903 Western Conference football standings
	Conf.					Overall
Team	W		L		T	W		L		T
Minnesota +	3	–	0	–	1	14	–	0	–	1
Michigan +	3	–	0	–	1	11	–	0	–	1
Northwestern +	1	–	0	–	2	10	–	1	–	3
Chicago	4	–	1	–	1	12	–	2	–	1
Iowa	1	–	1	–	0	9	–	2	–	0
Indiana	1	–	2	–	0	4	–	4	–	0
Illinois	1	–	5	–	0	8	–	6	–	0
Wisconsin	0	–	3	–	1	6	–	3	–	1
Purdue	0	–	2	–	0	4	–	2	–	0
+ – Conference co-champions

The 1903 Chicago Maroons football team was an American football team that represented the University of Chicago during the 1903 college football season. In their 12th season under head coach Amos Alonzo Stagg, the Maroons compiled a 12–2–1 record, finished in fourth place in the Western Conference with a 4–1–1 record against conference opponents, and outscored all opponents by a combined total of 413 to 61.

== Schedule ==
Date	Time	Opponent	Site	Result	Attendance	Source
September 17		Englewood High School*	Marshall Field; Chicago, IL	W 40–0		
September 19		Lombard *	Marshall Field; Chicago, IL	W 34–0		
September 23		North Division High School*	Marshall Field; Chicago, IL	W 33–0		
September 26		Lawrence*	Marshall Field; Chicago, IL	W 23–0		
September 30		Monmouth (IL)*	Marshall Field; Chicago, IL	W 108–0		
October 3		Indiana	Marshall Field; Chicago, IL	W 34–0		
October 7		Cornell (IA)*	Marshall Field; Chicago, IL	W 23–0		
October 10		Purdue	Marshall Field; Chicago, IL (rivalry)	W 22–0		
October 14		Rush Medical*	Marshall Field; Chicago, IL	W 40–0		
October 17		Northwestern	Marshall Field; Chicago, IL	T 0–0		
October 24		Illinois	Marshall Field; Chicago, IL	W 18–6		
October 31		at Wisconsin	Randall Field; Madison, WI	W 15–6		
November 7	2:44 p.m.	Haskell*	Marshall Field; Chicago, IL	W 17–11		
November 14		at Army*	The Plain; West Point, NY	L 6–10		
November 26		Michigan	Marshall Field; Chicago, IL (rivalry)	L 0–28	15,000–20,000	
*Non-conference game

== Roster ==
Player	Position	Weight
Alfred Chester Ellsworth (captain)	center, right tackle	189
Herbert Frederick Ahlswede	left guard	196
Hugo Francis Bezdek	right halfback, left halfback	169
Frank G. Burrows	left tackle, right tackle	174
Mark Seavey Catlin	left halfback	175
Walter Herbert Eckersall	quarterback	140
Melville Archibald Hill	right guard, center	215
George Edwin Ivison	left halfback	172
Charles Ferguson Kennedy	right end	146
Lee Wilder Maxwell	quarterback	156
Robert Wallace Maxwell	right guard, right tackle	244
George Nordenholt	fullback	168
Edwin Eugene Parry	left tackle	200
George Edward Schnur	quarterback	158
Frederick Adolph Speik	left end	174
John Frederick Tobin	right guard	194
Sherburne Henry Wightman	fullback, left guard	171
John Orlo Backhouse	substitute	167
Burton Pike Gale	substitute	182
Carl Huntley Hitchcock	substitute	153
Joseph Edward Hora	substitute	152
Wayland Wells Magee	substitute	160
Hiram Boardman Conibear	trainer

- Head coach: Amos Alonzo Stagg (12th year at Chicago)
