= 1903 Purdue Boilermakers football team =

American college football season

1903 Purdue Boilermakers football
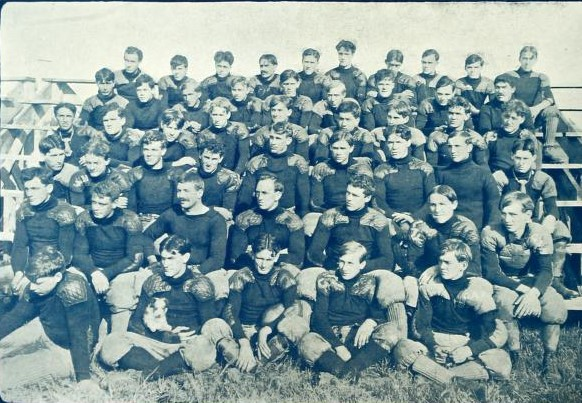
- Conference: Western Conference
- Record: 4–2 (0–2 Western)
- Head coach: Oliver Cutts (1st season)
- Captain: I. S. Osborn
- Home stadium: Stuart Field

1903 Western Conference football standings
	Conf.					Overall
Team	W		L		T	W		L		T
Minnesota +	3	–	0	–	1	14	–	0	–	1
Michigan +	3	–	0	–	1	11	–	0	–	1
Northwestern +	1	–	0	–	2	10	–	1	–	3
Chicago	4	–	1	–	1	12	–	2	–	1
Iowa	1	–	1	–	0	9	–	2	–	0
Indiana	1	–	2	–	0	4	–	4	–	0
Illinois	1	–	5	–	0	8	–	6	–	0
Wisconsin	0	–	3	–	1	6	–	3	–	1
Purdue	0	–	2	–	0	4	–	2	–	0
+ – Conference co-champions

The 1903 Purdue Boilermakers football team was an American football team that represented Purdue University during the 1903 college football season. In their first season under head coach Oliver Cutts, the Boilermakers compiled a 4–2 record before 14 players were killed in a train accident on the way to a game in Indianapolis. Purdue officials canceled the game and the remainder of Purdue's schedule, leading the Boilermakers to finish in last place in the Western Conference with an 0–2 record against conference opponents, outscoring their opponents by a total of 87 to 48. I. S. Osborn was the team captain.

== Schedule ==
Date	Opponent	Site	Result
September 26	Chicago Englewood High School*	Stuart Field; West Lafayette, IN	W 34–0
October 1	at Wabash*	Crawfordsville, IN	W 18–0
October 3	Beloit*	Stuart Field; West Lafayette, IN	W 17–0
October 10	at Chicago	Marshall Field; Chicago, IL	L 0–22
October 17	at Illinois	Stuart Field; West Lafayette, IN	L 0–24
October 24	Oberlin*	Stuart Field; West Lafayette, IN	W 18–2
October 31	vs. Indiana	Washington Park; Indianapolis, IN	cancelled, see Purdue Wreck
	Northwestern		
	Kentucky University*		
	DePauw*		
	Notre Dame*		
*Non-conference game; Source:

== Roster ==
- Harry Adams, HB
- D. M. Allen, T
- William Collar, QB
- Charles Furr, G
- Walter Hamilton, C
- A. L. Holter, HB
- Thomas Johnston, QB
- Joseph Knapp, HB
- Harry G. Leslie, FB
- Irving Long, T-G
- W. G. McManus, T
- F. H. Miller, C
- S. V. Miller, E
- J. H. Mowrey, HB
- I. S. Osborn, QB
- Roswell Powell, E
- F. Riebel, G
- Leo Rush
- Homer Thomas, FB
- C. Zimmerman, HB
