= 1903 Wisconsin Badgers football team =

American college football season

1903 Wisconsin Badgers football
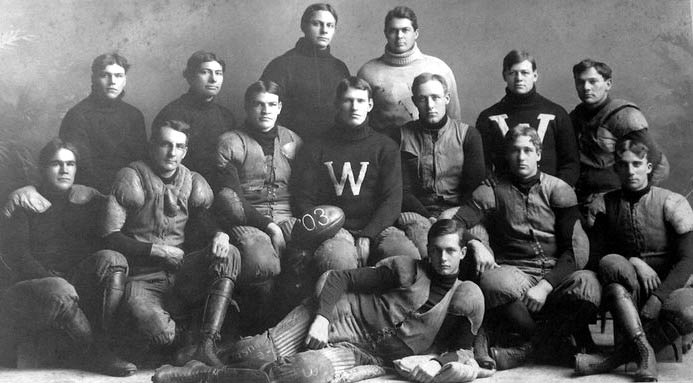
- Conference: Western Conference
- Record: 6–3–1 (0–3–1 Western)
- Head coach: Arthur Hale Curtis (1st season)
- Captain: Allen Abbott
- Home stadium: Randall Field

1903 Western Conference football standings
	Conf.					Overall
Team	W		L		T	W		L		T
Minnesota +	3	–	0	–	1	14	–	0	–	1
Michigan +	3	–	0	–	1	11	–	0	–	1
Northwestern +	1	–	0	–	2	10	–	1	–	3
Chicago	4	–	1	–	1	12	–	2	–	1
Iowa	1	–	1	–	0	9	–	2	–	0
Indiana	1	–	2	–	0	4	–	4	–	0
Illinois	1	–	5	–	0	8	–	6	–	0
Wisconsin	0	–	3	–	1	6	–	3	–	1
Purdue	0	–	2	–	0	4	–	2	–	0
+ – Conference co-champions

The 1903 Wisconsin Badgers football team represented the University of Wisconsin in the 1903 Western Conference football season. Led by first-year head coach Arthur Hale Curtis, the Badgers compiled an overall record of 6–3–1 with a mark of 0–3–1 in conference play, placing eighth in the Western Conference. The team's captain was Allen Abbott.

== Schedule ==
Date	Time	Opponent	Site	Result	Attendance	Source
October 3		North-Western College*	Randall Field; Madison, WI	W 28–0		
October 10		Lawrence*	Randall Field; Madison, WI	W 40–7		
October 17		Beloit*	Randall Field; Madison, WI	W 87–0		
October 21		Kirksville Osteopaths*	Randall Field; Madison, WI	W 32–0		
October 25		Knox (IL)*	Randall Field; Madison, WI	W 54–6		
October 31		Chicago	Randall Field; Madison, WI	L 6–15		
November 7		Oshkosh Normal*	Randall Field; Madison, WI	W 52–0		
November 14	2:00 p.m.	at Michigan	Regents Field; Ann Arbor, MI	L 0–16		
November 21	2:13 p.m.	vs. Northwestern	South Side Park; Chicago, IL	T 6–6	10,000	
November 26		Minnesota	Randall Field; Madison, WI (rivalry)	L 0–17	< 3,500	
*Non-conference game
