= Cecil Gooding =

American football player (1883–1904)

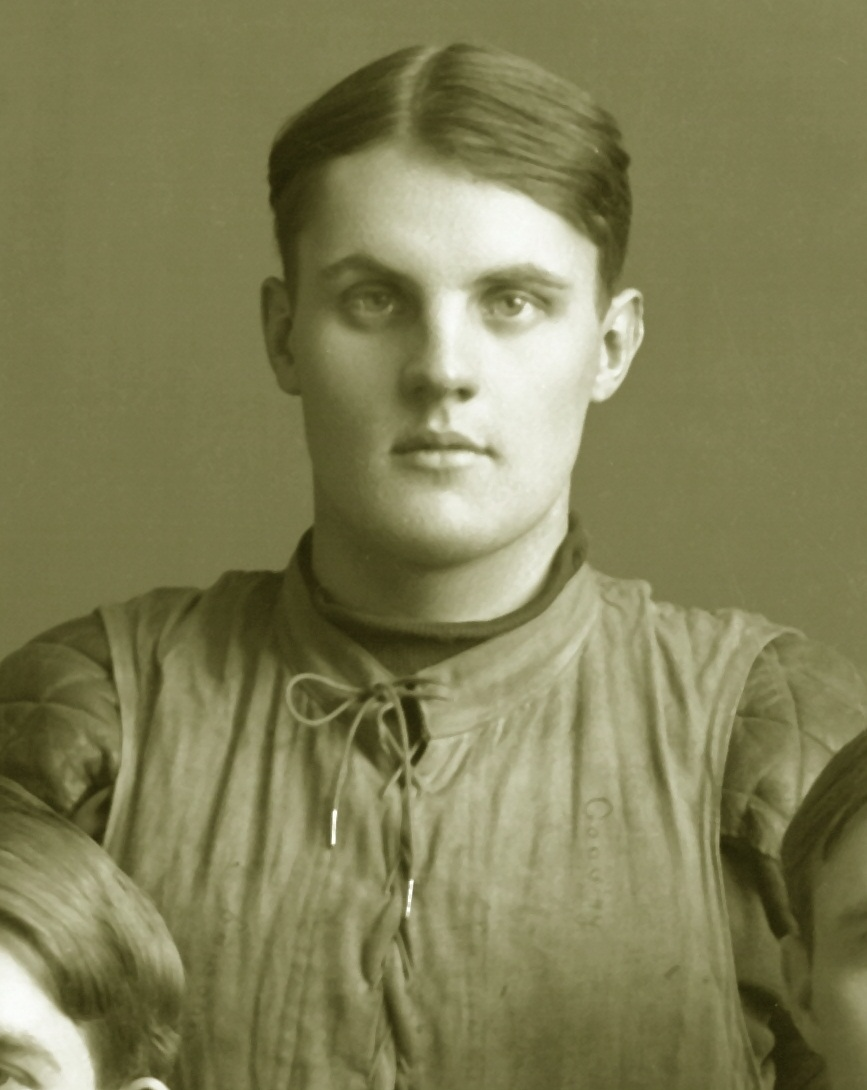

Michigan Wolverines
- Position: Guard

Personal information
- Born: May 1883; Michigan, U.S.
- Died: January 5, 1904 (aged 20); Ann Arbor, Michigan, U.S.

Career information
- College: Michigan (1902–1903)

Awards and highlights
- National champion (1903)

Cecil Gooding (May 1883 – January 5, 1904) was an American football player. Gooding attended Ann Arbor High School where he played football. He enrolled as an engineering student at the University of Michigan in the fall of 1901. He played on Michigan's All-Freshman football team in 1901 and became a backup at the guard position for the 1902 Michigan Wolverines football team. As a junior, he was the starting right guard in all 12 games for the 1903 Michigan Wolverines football team that compiled a record of 11-0-1 and outscored its opponents 565–6. The 1903 Michigan team has been recognized as national champions by the National Championship Foundation. He contracted typhoid fever following a Thanksgiving Day game against the University of Minnesota in late November 1903. It was believed that he contracted the illness from drinking the water while in Chicago for the game. He died five weeks later. He was the first Michigan Wolverines football player to die while attending the school. Following his death, The Michigan Alumnus wrote: "He had striven conscientiously to perfect himself in the game and earned the respect of coaches, players and spectators. He was a reliable, hard-working guard who never under any circumstances played anything but a sportsmanlike game. He was a man off the field and on." He was buried at York Charter Township, Washtenaw County, Michigan.
