= Oliver Cutts =

American football player, coach, and administrator (1873–1939)

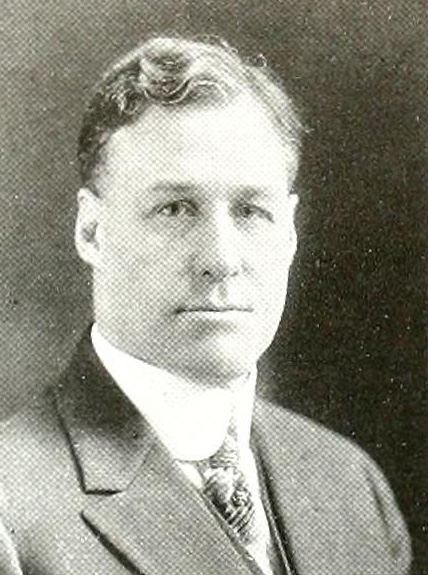
- Cutts pictured in Debris 1917, Purdue yearbook

Biographical details
- Born: August 6, 1873; North Anson, Maine, U.S.
- Died: August 4, 1939 (aged 65); Boston, Massachusetts, U.S.

Playing career
- 1893–1895: Bates
- 1901: Harvard
- Positions: Guard, tackle

Coaching career (HC unless noted)
- 1902: Bates (assistant)
- 1903–1904: Purdue
- 1905: Washington
- 1906–1907: Harvard (assistant)
- 1922–1924: Bates

Administrative career (AD unless noted)
- 1904–1905: Purdue
- 1915–1918: Purdue
- 1922–1938: Bates

Head coaching record
- Overall: 26–23–3

Accomplishments and honors

Awards
- Consensus All-American (1901)

Oliver Frost Cutts (August 6, 1873 – August 4, 1939) was an American college football player, coach, and college athletics administrator. He served as the head football coach at Purdue University (1903–1904), the University of Washington (1905), and Bates College (1922–1924), compiling a career head coaching record of 23–18–3. Cutts was also the athletic director at Purdue (1904–1905 and 1915–1918) and Bates (1922–1938).

== Playing career ==
Cutts attended Bates College and played for the school's football team in 1893. He was a member of the track and baseball teams the following spring, but a leg injury forced him to miss the 1894 football season. He played both baseball and football in 1895. He attended Harvard Summer School at the end of his sophomore year and was Bates' gymnasium leader during his junior and season years. From 1896 to 1900, he was a mathematics teacher and athletic coach at the Haverford School. In 1901, Cutts enrolled in Harvard Law School. He had one year of college athletic eligibility remaining and played tackle for the 1901 Harvard Crimson football team.

== Coaching career ==
In 1902, Cutts assisted Bates football coach Royce Purinton when it didn't interfere with his studies. From 1903 to 1904, he was the head coach at Purdue University. His 1903 football team was involved in a train wreck that killed 14 of its players. Cutts suffered crushed bones in both of his ankles but spent a day tending to his fellow injured passengers before going to the hospital. The following season, the Boilermakers 9–3 and outscored opponents 176–66. In 1905, he moved to Seattle to practice law. That year, he coached at the University of Washington football team, where he compiled a 4–2–2 record.

== Administration ==
From 1911 to 1914, Cutts did recruiting for the YMCA in New York City. In 1915, he returned to Purdue as director of athletics. From 1919 to 1922, Cutts was out of athletics, instead working for Dungan, Hood & Company, a Philadelphia-based manufacturer of glazed kid leather. In 1922, Cutts returned to Bates as athletic director. Cutts took over as head football coach shortly before the 1922 season due to the resignation of Raymond A. Watkins. He stepped down as football coach after the 1924 season but continued to serve as athletic director until his retirement in 1938.

== Personal life ==
In 1909, Cutts married Eugenia Ayer of Dorchester, Massachusetts. They had two daughters.

Cutts died on August 4, 1939, at his home in the Jamaica Plain neighborhood of Boston, Massachusetts.

== Head coaching record ==
Year	Team	Overall	Conference	Standing	Bowl/playoffs
Purdue Boilermakers (Western Conference) (1903–1904)
1903	Purdue	4–2	0–2	9th	
1904	Purdue	9–3	1–2	T–5th	
Purdue:		13–5	1–4		
Washington (Independent) (1905)
1905	Washington	5–2–2			
Washington:		5–2–2			
Bates Bobcats (Independent) (1922–1923)
1922	Bates	2–6–1			
1923	Bates	3–5			
1924	Bates	3–5			
Bates:		8–16–1			
Total:		26–23–3			
