= 1903 Northwestern Purple football team =

American college football season

1903 Northwestern Purple football

Western Conference co-champion
- Conference: Western Conference
- Record: 10–1–3 (1–0–2 Western)
- Head coach: Walter McCornack (1st season)
- Captain: Dixie Fleager
- Home stadium: Sheppard Field

1903 Western Conference football standings
	Conf.					Overall
Team	W		L		T	W		L		T
Minnesota +	3	–	0	–	1	14	–	0	–	1
Michigan +	3	–	0	–	1	11	–	0	–	1
Northwestern +	1	–	0	–	2	10	–	1	–	3
Chicago	4	–	1	–	1	12	–	2	–	1
Iowa	1	–	1	–	0	9	–	2	–	0
Indiana	1	–	2	–	0	4	–	4	–	0
Illinois	1	–	5	–	0	8	–	6	–	0
Wisconsin	0	–	3	–	1	6	–	3	–	1
Purdue	0	–	2	–	0	4	–	2	–	0
+ – Conference co-champions

The 1903 Northwestern Purple team was an American football team that represented Northwestern University as a member of the Western Conference (now commonly known as the Big Ten Conference) during the 1903 college football season. In their first season under head coach Walter McCornack, the Wildcats compiled a 10–1–3 record (1–0–2 in conference games), shut out eight opponents, outscored all opponents by a total of 229 to 67, and tied for the conference championship. They were undefeated in the first eleven games, finally losing in the final game of the season to the team from the Carlisle Indian Industrial School.

== Schedule ==
Date	Time	Opponent	Site	Result	Attendance	Source
September 19		North Division High School	Evanston, IL	W 22–5		
September 22		Fort Sheridan	Evanston, IL	W 28–0		
September 23		Englewood High School	Evanston, IL	W 35–0		
September 26		Northwestern College	Sheppard Field; Evanston, IL	W 22–6		
September 30		Northwestern alumni	Evanston, IL	W 5–0		
October 3		Lombard	Evanston, IL	W 23–0		
October 7		Chicago Dental	Evanston, IL	W 18–11		
October 10		at Washington University	League Park; St. Louis, MO	W 23–0		
October 17		at Chicago	Marshall Field; Chicago, IL	T 0–0		
October 24	2:30 p.m.	at Cincinnati	Burnet Woods; Cincinnati, OH	W 35–0		
October 31		at Illinois	Illinois Field; Champaign, IL	W 12–11		
November 14		vs. Notre Dame	South Side Park; Chicago, IL (rivalry)	T 0–0		
November 21	2:13 p.m.	vs. Wisconsin	South Side Park; Chicago, IL	T 6–6	10,000	
November 26		vs. Carlisle	South Side Park; Chicago, IL	L 0–28	3,000	
