= 1903 Michigan Wolverines football team =

American college football season

1903 Michigan Wolverines football
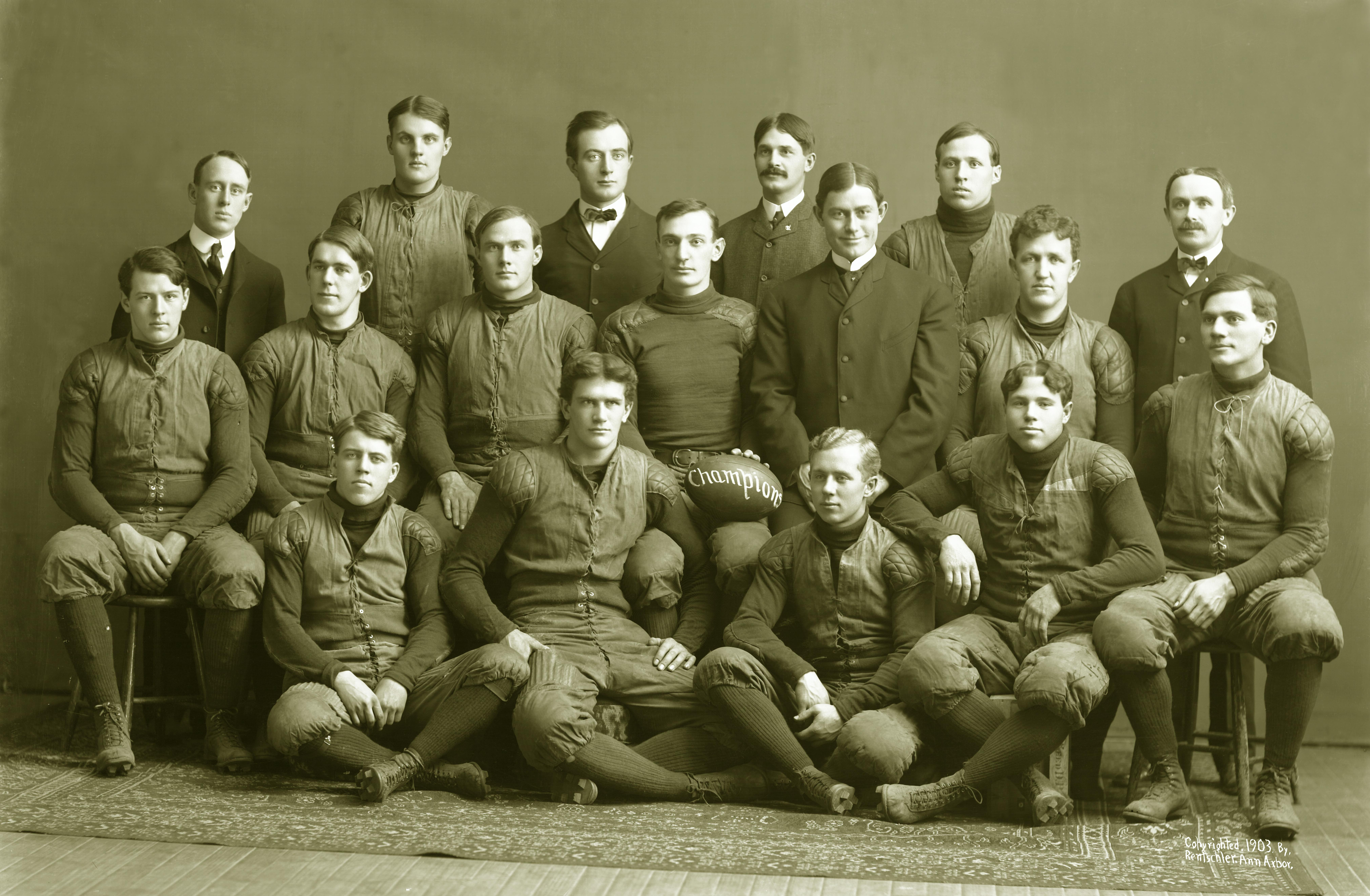

National champion (Billingsley) Co-national champion (NCF) Western Conference co-champion
- Conference: Western Conference
- Record: 11–0–1 (3–0–1 Western)
- Head coach: Fielding H. Yost (3rd season)
- Offensive scheme: Short punt
- Captain: Curtis Redden
- Home stadium: Regents Field

1903 Western Conference football standings
	Conf.					Overall
Team	W		L		T	W		L		T
Minnesota +	3	–	0	–	1	14	–	0	–	1
Michigan +	3	–	0	–	1	11	–	0	–	1
Northwestern +	1	–	0	–	2	10	–	1	–	3
Chicago	4	–	1	–	1	12	–	2	–	1
Iowa	1	–	1	–	0	9	–	2	–	0
Indiana	1	–	2	–	0	4	–	4	–	0
Illinois	1	–	5	–	0	8	–	6	–	0
Wisconsin	0	–	3	–	1	6	–	3	–	1
Purdue	0	–	2	–	0	4	–	2	–	0
+ – Conference co-champions

The 1903 Michigan Wolverines football team represented the University of Michigan in the 1903 college football season. The team's head football coach was Fielding H. Yost. The Wolverines played their home games at Regents Field. The 1903 team compiled a record of 11–0–1 and outscored opponents 565 to 6. The only points allowed came on a touchdown in a 6–6 tie with Minnesota. All eleven wins were shutouts. The 1903 Michigan team was the third of Yost's "Point-a-Minute" teams and has been recognized retrospectively as a co-national champion by the National Championship Foundation.

The team captain was Curtis Redden, and the high scorer was fullback Tom Hammond who scored 163 points. Halfback Willie Heston was the only member of the team selected as a first-team All-American, receiving the honor from both Walter Camp in Collier's Weekly and Caspar Whitney in Outing magazine.

== Schedule ==
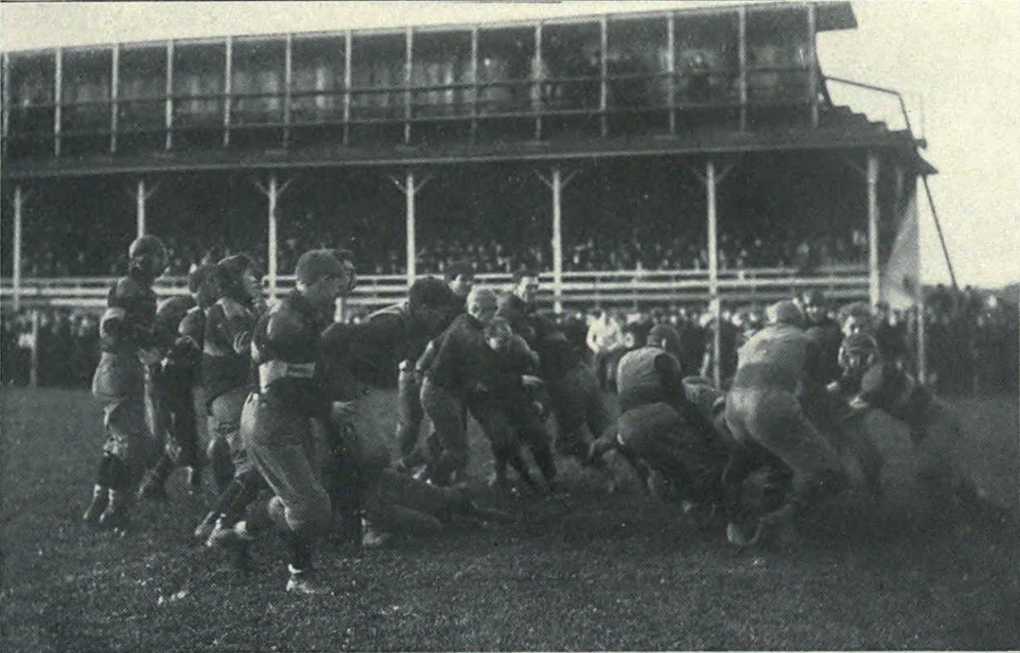
1903 football game at Regents Field

Date	Time	Opponent	Site	Result	Attendance
October 3		Case*	Regents Field; Ann Arbor, MI	W 31–0	2,000
October 8		Albion*	Regents Field; Ann Arbor, MI	W 76–0	
October 10		Beloit*	Regents Field; Ann Arbor, MI	W 79–0	
October 14		Ohio Northern*	Regents Field; Ann Arbor, MI	W 65–0	
October 17		Indiana	Regents Field; Ann Arbor, MI	W 51–0	
October 21		Ferris State*	Regents Field; Ann Arbor, MI	W 88–0	8,000
October 24		Drake*	Regents Field; Ann Arbor, MI	W 47–0	
October 31		at Minnesota	Northrop Field; Minneapolis, MN (Little Brown Jug)	T 6–6	20,000–30,000
November 7		Ohio State*	Regents Field; Ann Arbor, MI (rivalry)	W 36–0	5,000
November 14	2:00 p.m.	Wisconsin^{†}	Regents Field; Ann Arbor, MI	W 16–0	
November 21		Oberlin*	Regents Field; Ann Arbor, MI	W 42–0	
November 26		at Chicago	Marshall Field; Chicago, IL (rivalry)	W 28–0	15,000–20,000
*Non-conference game; ^{†}Homecoming; All times are in Eastern time

== Preseason ==
=== Controversy ===
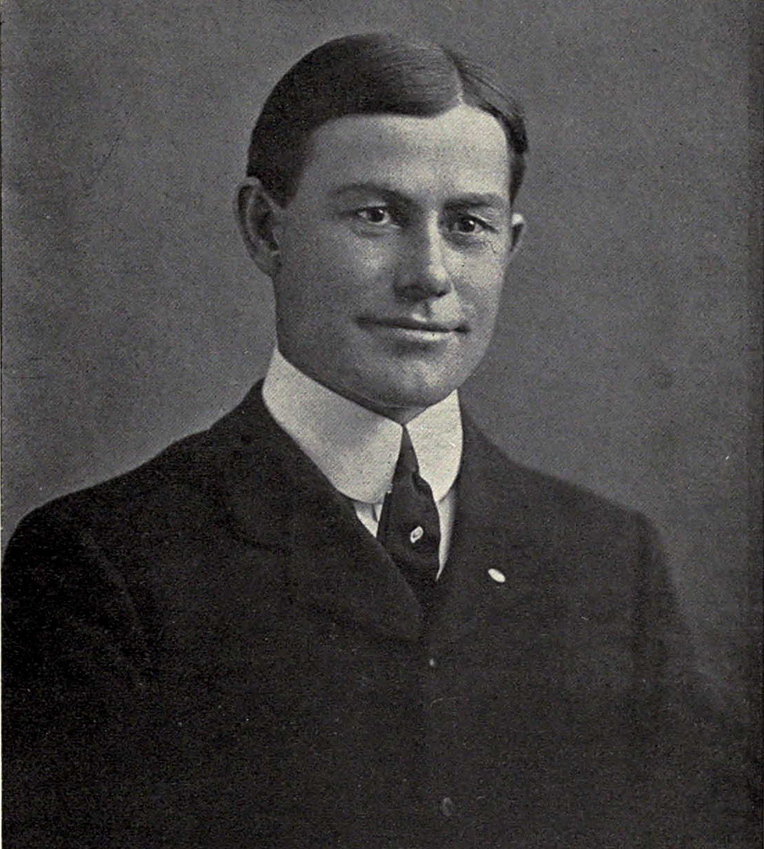
Fielding Yost from the 1904 Michiganensian

Before the start of the 1903 season, Michigan became involved in controversy over amateurism in college football. In April 1903, David Starr Jordan, the president of Stanford University, accused Michigan coach Fielding Yost of sinning against the spirit of amateur athletics. Jordan's accusations focused on two players, George W. Gregory and Willie Heston, both of whom had come to Michigan from California with Coach Yost in 1901. The Detroit Free Press reported in early September 1903 that the two might opt not to return to the University of Michigan when classes resumed.

A report issued by the North Central Association of Colleges and Secondary Schools in April 1903 advocated stricter regulation to protect the amateur nature of the games. Although the report contained only passing references to the University of Michigan, the Chicago Record-Herald devoted much of its coverage to attacks on amateurism at the University of Michigan. The Michigan Alumnus expressed concern that football posed a danger "to the minds and morals of the players and their fellow-students." It published an open letter to Coach Yost on the evils of recruiting in college football. The open letter advocated the adoption of a one-year residency rule requiring a year of satisfactory scholarship for all players on college teams. Professor Albert Pattengill, chairman of Michigan's Board of Control of Athletics, defended Yost:

"In justice to Mr. Yost it must be said that the greatest sin we can lay at his door is that for two seasons he has led Michigan's team to victory. He is a man of good personal habits, and enthusiastic in his work. He exercises a wholesome influence over the young men under him. . . . We have made many inquiries, and have not heard from any sources anything to give cause for uneasiness. . . .

=== Training camp and pre-season expectations ===
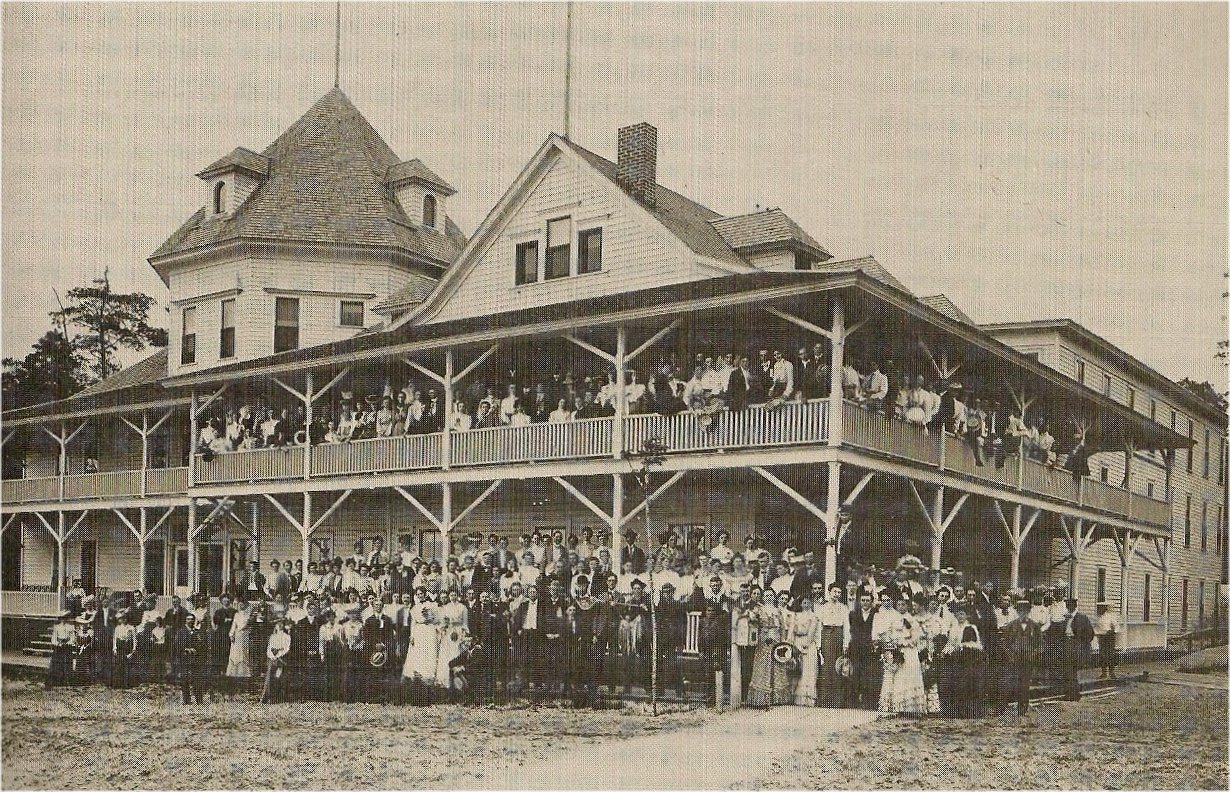
The Epworth Heights resort, where Michigan conducted its 1903 training camp.

Although Michigan's football training camp had previously been held at Whitmore Lake, Yost moved the team's pre-season camp to the Epworth Hotel in Epworth Heights, a summer resort located three miles from Ludington, Michigan. Yost hoped that the northern location would allow the team to practice away from the September heat. Training camp opened on September 14, 1903, and was attended by 25 players, Yost, and trainer Keene Fitzpatrick. While in Ludington, the Michigan players played a baseball game against the local team and attended a dance at the Stearns Hotel in downtown Ludington. The locals were surprised when the guests of honor left the dance at 10:05 pm, under orders from Keene Fitzpatrick. The squad returned to Ann Arbor on September 26 and joined a separate body of recruits training under the direction of assistant coach Dan McGugin.

At the start of the 1903 season, there were concerns about the team's lack of experience. Most of the starters from the 1902 team had been lost, including the team's two leading scorers (Albert E. Herrnstein and James E. Lawrence), its starting quarterback (Boss Weeks), and four of the starting linemen (Everett Sweeley, Dan McGugin, "King" Cole, and "Babe" Carter). Adding to the problems, the 1902 team's starting fullback (Paul Jones) suffered a nearly deadly attack of typhoid fever in early 1903 and was unable to return to the team.

The most promising new players on the 1903 squad included Joe Curtis, a 212-pounder from Pueblo, Colorado, Tom Hammond, a fullback from Hyde Park, Illinois, and John Garrels, a speedster from Detroit who went on to win the silver medal in the 110 meter hurdles at the 1908 Summer Olympics. With only eight veterans returning team captain Curtis Redden wrote that "[n]o season in the history of Michigan football has opened with a gloomier outlook" than that of 1903. The Michigan Alumnus opined that a repetition of the extraordinary scores of 1902 was too much to expect, but expressed hope that the 1903 team would be able to "cope honorably" with its "most dreaded rivals," Chicago and Minnesota.

== Game summaries ==
=== Michigan 31, Case 0 ===
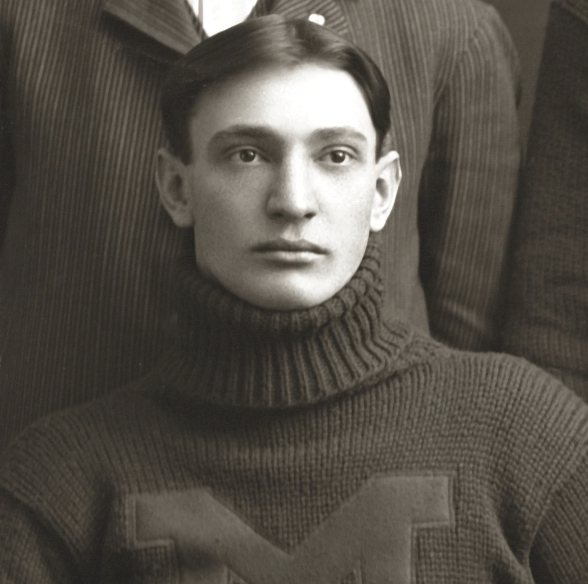
1903 team captain Curtis Redden died in action while serving in France during World War I.

The season opener was played on October 3, 1903, in weather that was described as "excessively warm for football." The game was played in 20-minute halves and matched Michigan against Case Scientific School in front of 2,000 people. Willie Heston scored three touchdowns in the game, including one on a 45-yard run. Tom Hammond also scored two touchdowns, and Hal Weeks scored after substituting for Heston at left halfback in the second half. Michigan converted only one of six point after touchdown attempts, and the team's punting and goal-kicking were described as "sad failures."

Player	Position	Starter	Touchdowns	Extra points	Field goals	Points
Willie Heston	Left halfback	yes	3	0	0	15
Tom Hammond	Fullback	yes	2	0	0	10
Hal Weeks	Left halfback	no	1	0	0	5
Herb Graver	Right halfback	no	0	1	0	1

=== Michigan 76, Albion 0 ===
The second game of the 1903 season was played on Thursday, October 8, against Albion College. In a game that consisted of 27-1/2 minutes (first half of 20 minutes, second half of 7-1/2 minutes), Michigan scored 76 points. The Wolverines failed to score on only one drive, and were stopped inside Albion's five-yard line on that drive. Albion converted only two first downs in the game. Tom Hammond led the scoring with 35 points on five touchdowns and 10 successful point after touchdown kicks. Willie Heston added three touchdowns, and single touchdowns were added by Herb Graver, Roswell Wendell, Fred Norcross, and Rolla Bigelow.

Player	Position	Starter	Touchdowns	Extra points	Field goals	Points
Tom Hammond	Fullback	yes	5	10	0	35
Willie Heston	Left halfback	yes	3	0	0	15
Herb Graver	Right halfback	yes	2	0	0	10
Roswell Wendell	Right halfback	no	1	1	0	6
Fred Norcross	Left halfback	no	1	0	0	5
Rolla Bigelow	Fullback	no	1	0	0	5

=== Michigan 79, Beloit 0 ===
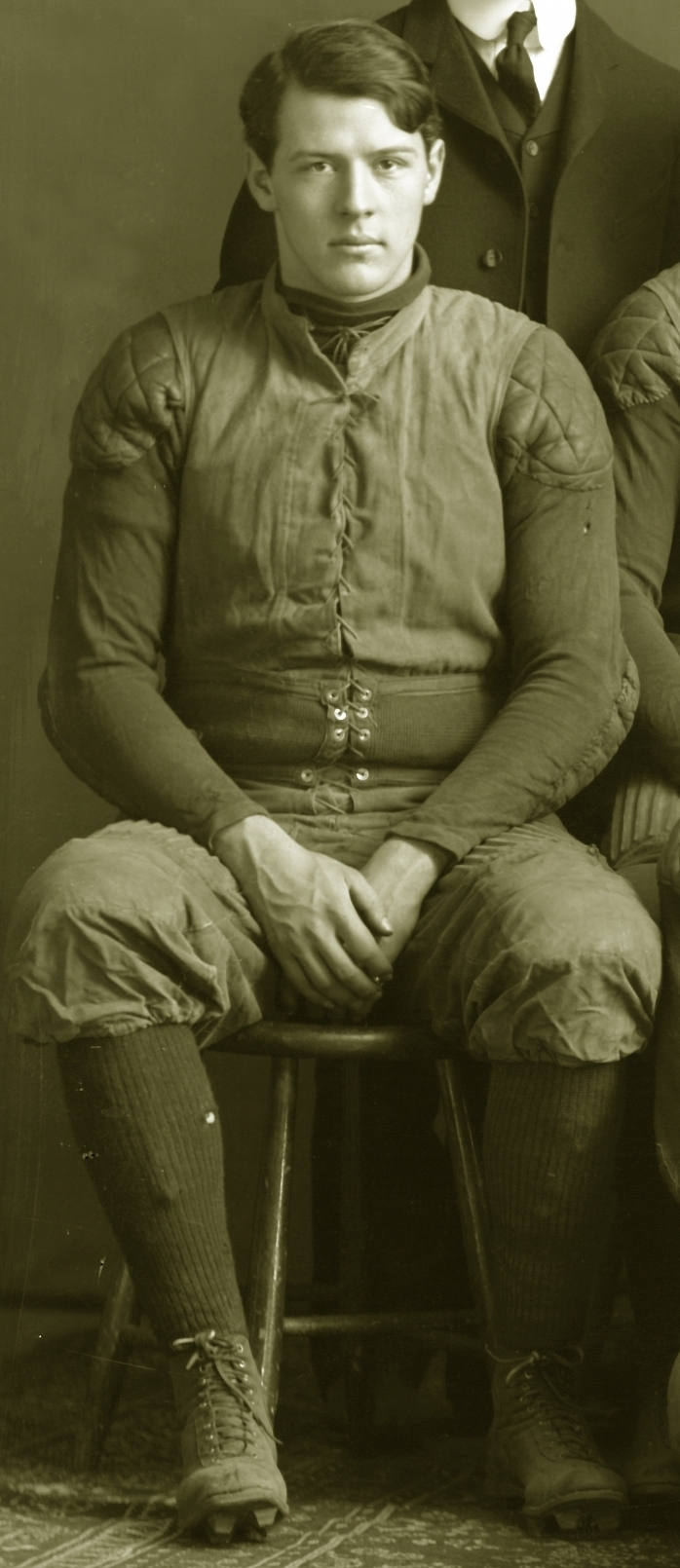
Tom Hammond was the leading scorer on the 1903 team with 163 points scored.

Two days after the Albion game, Michigan faced Beloit. In 45 minutes of football (first half of 25 minutes, second half of 20 minutes), Michigan scored 79 points. The Michigan Alumnus praised the team effort on offense and singled out Gooding who "once carried Heston over the line for a touchdown." Curtis Redden was also praised for his blocking and for his clever play in recovering and returning a Beloit fumble in the second half. Willie Heston and Fred Norcross led the scoring with five and three touchdowns, respectively. The Michigan Alumnus noted, "Time after time Heston and Norcross, aided by good blocking, sprinted long distances for touchdowns."

Through the first three games of the 1903 season, the Wolverines scored 186 points in 112 1/2 minutes of play. The Detroit Free Press noted that Yost's team narrowly missed averaging two points per minute against Beloit.

Player	Position	Starter	Touchdowns	Extra points	Field goals	Safeties	Points
Willie Heston	Left halfback	yes	5	0	0	0	25
Fred Norcross	Right halfback	yes	3	0	0	0	15
Rolla Bigelow			3	0	0	0	15
Duncan Thompson	Right halfback	no	2	0	0	0	10
Tom Hammond	Fullback	yes	0	7	0	0	7
Joe Curtis	Left tackle	yes	0	5	0	0	5
na	na	na	0	0	0	1	2

=== Michigan 65, Ohio Normal 0 ===
On Wednesday, October 14, 1903, Michigan played Ohio Normal from Ada, Ohio. In 34 minutes of football (first half of 20 minutes, second half of 14 minutes), Michigan scored 65 points. Duncan Thompson, starting at the right halfback position, led the scoring with four touchdowns. The "most stirring" play of the game was a 75-yard touchdown run "through the whole Ohio team" by Fred Norcross. Ohio Normal's longest gain was a seven-yard run. The Michigan Alumnus noted that the Wolverines' play was "at times over-zealous and severe penalties for foul interference and off-side resulted."

Through the first four games of the 1903 season, the Wolverines scored 251 points in 146 1/2 minutes of play.

Player	Position	Starter	Touchdowns	Extra points	Field goals	Points
Tom Hammond	Fullback	yes	2	10	0	20
Duncan Thompson	Right halfback	yes	4	0	0	20
Fred Norcross	Right halfback	no	2	0	0	10
Willie Heston	Left halfback	yes	1	0	0	5
Joe Maddock	Right tackle	yes	1	0	0	5
Hal Weeks	Left halfback	no	1	0	0	5

=== Michigan 51, Indiana 0 ===
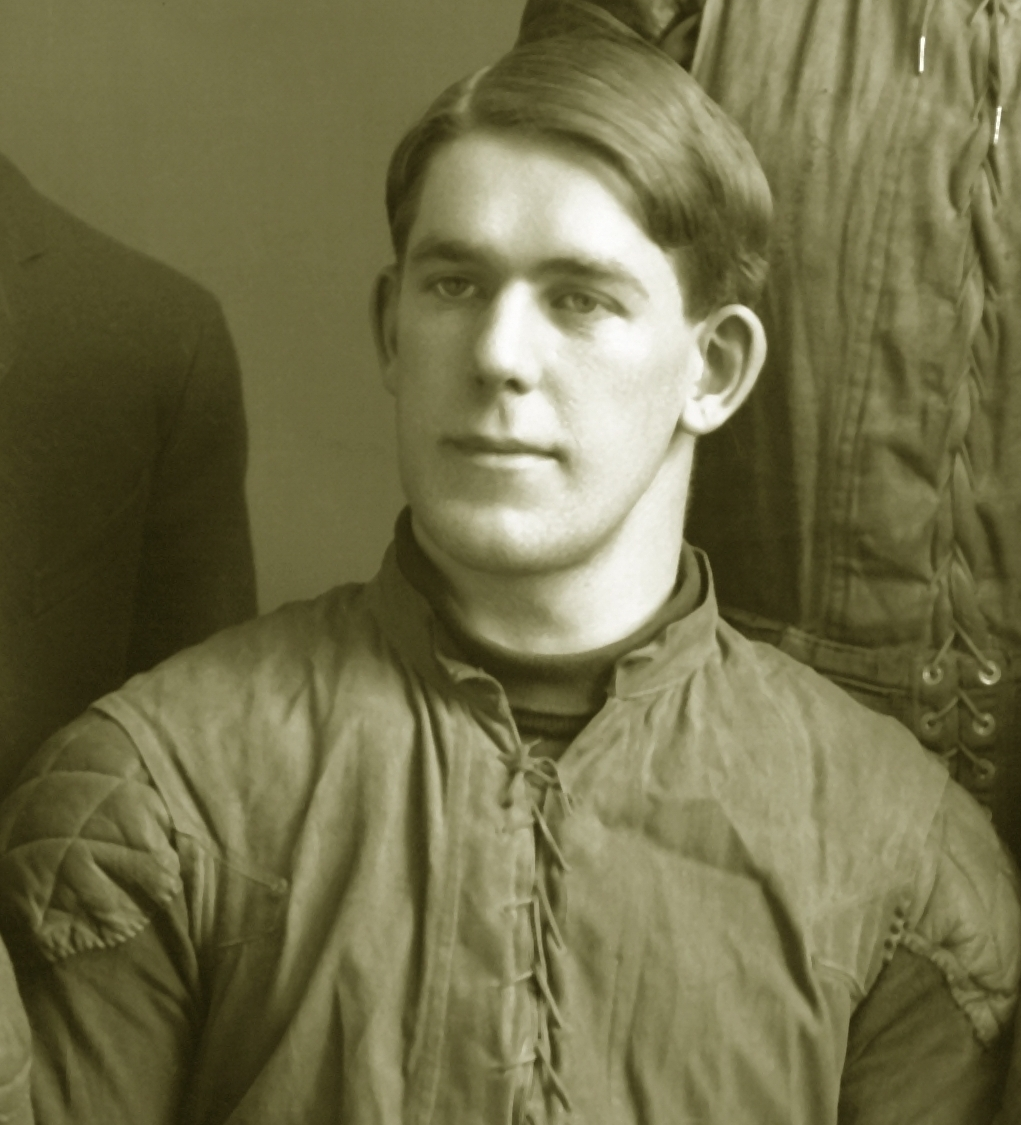
Herb Graver was the second leading scorer on the 1903 team with 76 points scored.

Three days after its mid-week contest against Ohio Normal, the Wolverines played Indiana on October 17, 1901. In the season's first full-length game (two halves of 25 minutes), Michigan outscored Indiana 51 to 0. Despite the lopsided score, The Michigan Alumnus complained that certain features of the team's play were "most unsatisfactory," including fumbles and a lack of versatility in the team's offensive play. Curtis Redden was credited with the "prettiest run of the day" for recovering a half-blocked punt and returning it 65 yards for Michigan's third touchdown. Tom Hammond scored 21 points in the game on two touchdowns, 6 point after touchdown kicks, and a field goal.

Through the first five games of the 1903 season, the Wolverines scored 302 points in 196 1/2 minutes of play.

Player	Position	Starter	Touchdowns	Extra points	Field goals	Points
Tom Hammond	Fullback	yes	2	6	1	21
Herb Graver	Right halfback	yes	2	0	0	10
Curtis Redden	Left end	yes	1	0	0	5
Joe Maddock	Right tackle	yes	1	0	0	5
Duncan Thompson	Right halfback	no	1	0	0	5
Frank Longman	Righte end	yes	1	0	0	5

=== Michigan 88, Ferris Institute 0 ===
In another mid-week game, Michigan defeated the team from the Ferris Institute in Big Rapids, Michigan, by a score of 88 to 0. The Wolverines added to their "Point-a-Minute" margin by scoring 88 points in only 30 minutes of play (first half of 20 minutes, second half of 10 minutes). The Ferris team was held to an "aggregate of gains" of only eight yards. The Michigan Alumnus described the game as a mismatch: "The visitors were hopelessly outclassed in weight and experience, but under these trying conditions did the best they could." Willie Heston did not play in the game, and Tom Hammond was the leading scorer for the second consecutive week with 23 points on three touchdowns and eight point after touchdown kicks.

Through the first six games of the 1903 season, the Wolverines scored 390 points in 226 1/2 minutes of play.

Player	Position	Starter	Touchdowns	Extra points	Field goals	Points
Tom Hammond	Fullback	yes	3	8	0	23
Herb Graver	Right halfback	yes	3	0	0	15
Joe Maddock	Right tackle	yes	3	0	0	15
Duncan Thompson	Right halfback	no	2	0	0	10
Joe Curtis	Left tackle	yes	1	5	0	10
Fred Norcross	Left halfback	yes	1	0	0	5
Rolla Bigelow	Left halfback	no	1	0	0	5
Eugene Person	Fullback	no	1	0	0	5

=== Michigan 47, Drake 0 ===
Michigan's game against Drake on October 24, 1903, was described at the time as "the most exciting contest seen on Ferry Field this year." With Willie Heston was on the sidelines, the Wolverines failed to score a point-a-minute for the first time in 1903, scoring 47 points in 55 minutes of play (first half of 30 minutes, second half of 25 minutes). In the first half, Drake held Michigan to only 18 points. Drake came close to scoring the first points of the year against Michigan after its fullback, Kintz, ran for 25 yards, and an off-side penalty (resulting in a 20-yard penalty) brought the ball within reach of Michigan's goal. Drake's left guard, Stewart, attempted a field goal, but missed by "the narrowest of margins." Right tackle Joe Maddock led the scoring with three touchdowns in the game.

Through the first seven games of the 1903 season, the Wolverines scored 437 points in 281 1/2 minutes of play.

Player	Position	Starter	Touchdowns	Extra points	Field goals	Points
Joe Maddock	Right tackle	yes	3	0	0	15
Joe Curtis	Left tackle	yes	2	2	0	12
Herb Graver	Right halfback	yes	2	0	0	10
Tom Hammond	Fullback	yes	0	5	0	5
Fred Norcross	Left halfback	yes	1	0	0	5

=== Michigan 6, Minnesota 6 ===
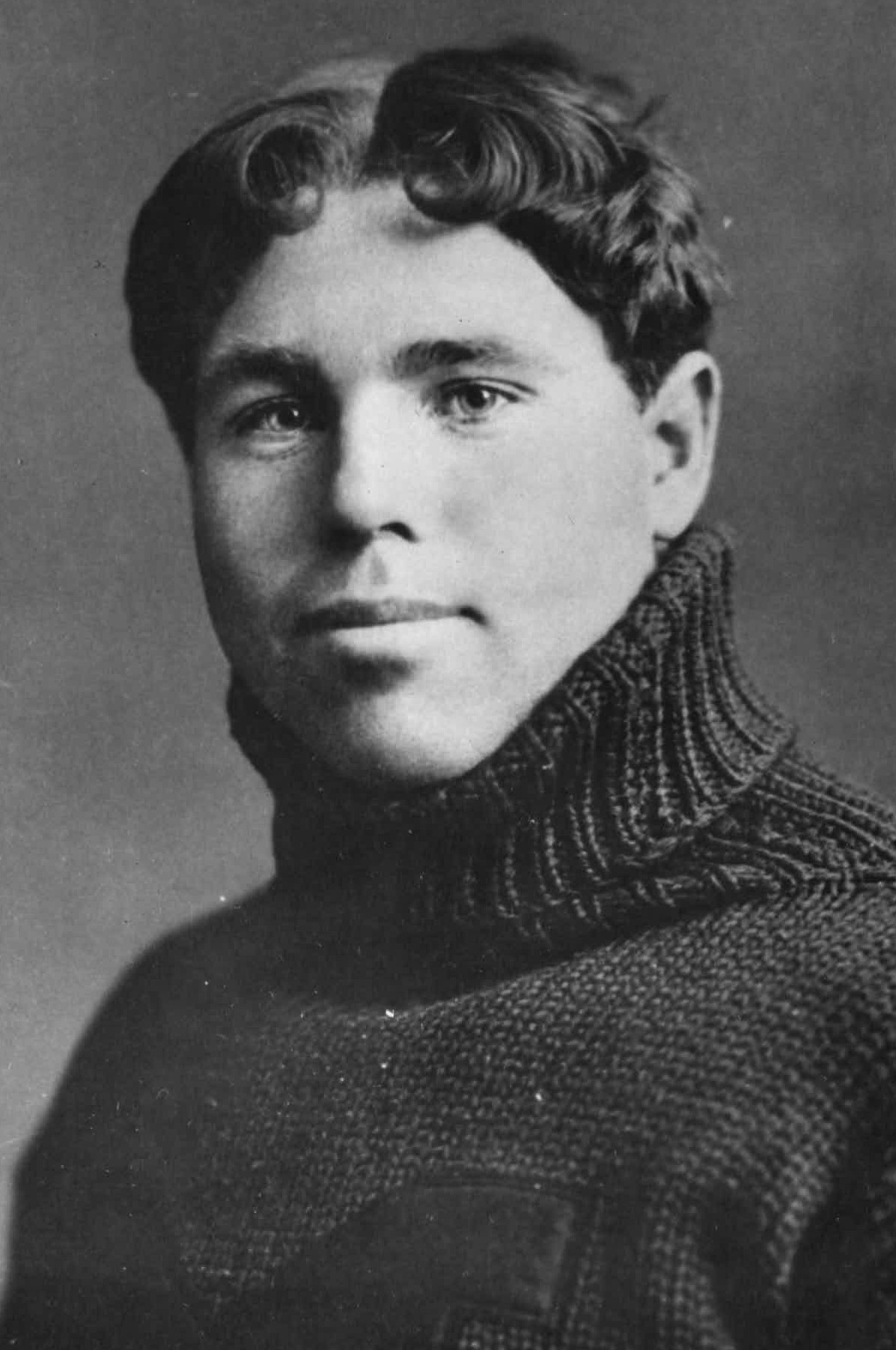
Willie Heston returned from the Minnesota game with his right eye nearly swollen shut.

The eighth game of the season matched Michigan against Minnesota in a game played at Northrop Field in Minneapolis, Minnesota. The New York Times reported that the match, "one of the most desperate football games seen in the West in years," was witnessed by "fully 30,000 spectators." The game ended in a 6–6 tie, the first time in the Yost era that Michigan had not achieved a victory. During the first half, Minnesota outgained Michigan 155 yards to 60 yards. The Michigan defense held, and the first half ended in a scoreless tie.

With 15 minutes remaining in the game, Michigan sustained a 65-yard drive culminating with a touchdown by right tackle Joe Maddock. On the drive that followed, the Michigan line was "unable to sustain Schacht's fierce line smashes," and Minnesota tied the game with a touchdown run by its fullback, Boeckmann, and Rogers kicked the point after touchdown. Although approximately two minutes remained in the game, Minnesota fans surged onto the field, and the game had to be ended early. The Detroit Free Press described the scene as follows:

"Time was not up by a few minutes, but the crowd surged onto the field and time was called, as it would have been impossible to have cleared the gridiron in time to resume play before daylight had faded entirely away."

When the Michigan team returned to Ann Arbor on November 1, the players were greeted by a crowd of 5,000 singing and yelling at the depot. The crowd attached ropes to a bus and towed the team to campus while continuing with organized songs and yells. At a rally near the law building, Willie Heston told the crowd that the Minnesota players were "the roughest lot of sluggers I ever went up against." Heston's right eye was nearly swollen shut, and his nose bore "marks of terrific smashes." Joe Maddock added, "I don't know how many times I was hit and kicked, but I think I got at least twenty blows on the back of my neck." The Michigan Alumnus complained about "the unsportsmanlike spirit" manifested by some Minnesota players and opined that the Minnesota fans who surged onto the field had responded to "an impulse which does more credit to their enthusiasm than their love of fair play." The Detroit Free Press condemned "the muckerish tactics of the crowd and the pugilistic efforts of the Gophers." Several in attendance reported that Minnesota assistant coach Pudge Heffelfinger had been heard yelling from the sidelines, "Kill off Heston in the first ten minutes, or you'll lose." The crowd reportedly picked up the comment and responded with the yell, "Kill off Heston." The game's umpire, Henry Clark, was selected by Minnesota, and he came under heavy criticism from Michigan loyalists for failing to call Minnesota for its rough play.

The Minnesota game generated gross gate receipts of $30,933.50. After deducting expenses, Michigan's share was $13,000. Yost defended his team's performance upon his return to Ann Arbor. Pulling a criss-crossed chart from his pocket, Yost walked through the progress of the game with reporters. Even though Minnesota outgained Michigan in the first half, Yost said:

"Why, they never had the ball inside our 30-yard line but once during the first half, and it was just inside at that time. The goal was never in danger because our boys played a scientific defensive game and kept the ball in the air part of the time, where it belonged. We had good headwork as well as beef, and I do not think it is fair to Michigan to say that she was outplayed in the first half. The touchdown the Minnesota boys made was made after dark, when nobody could see the ball, and of course that prevented us from stopping them. Also, the field was crowned. I am confident, however, that we have the better team. That man Gooding and Heston played a wonderful game, and all the boys did, for that matter. I have no fault to find with anyone."

Through the first eight games of the 1903 season, the Wolverines scored 443 points and had played between 329 and 349 minutes.

Player	Position	Starter	Touchdowns	Extra points	Field goals	Points
Maddock	Right tackle	yes	1	0	0	5
Tom Hammond	Fullback	yes	0	1	0	1

==== Little Brown Jug ====
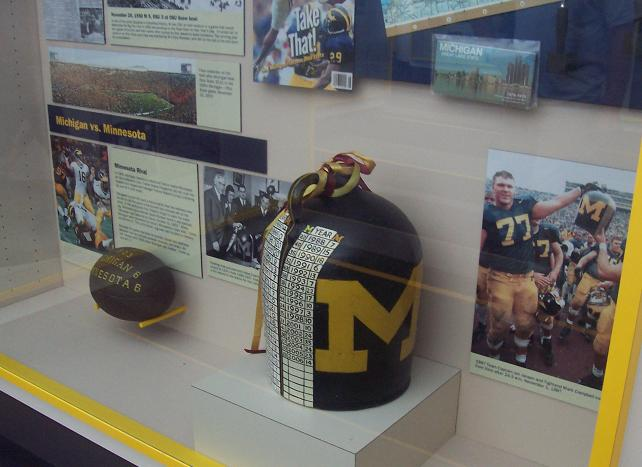
Replica of the Little Brown Jug on display in Ann Arbor, Michigan, in 2007. The real Jug is kept in storage.

The 1903 game against Minnesota also gave rise to the tradition of the two teams' playing for the Little Brown Jug. When the Michigan team arrived in Minneapolis, Yost reportedly instructed student manager Thomas B. Roberts to purchase a water jug. Roberts purchased a five-gallon jug for 30¢ from a local variety store. In the chaos that ensued when the Minnesota crowd rushed onto the field, the Wolverines left the jug behind. Thomas Roberts, writing in 1956, stated that the jug had served its purpose, so he intentionally left it sitting on the field. The next day, custodian Oscar Munson brought the jug to L. J. Cooke, head of the Minnesota athletics department. Cooke and Munson painted the jug brown and wrote on it, "Michigan Jug – Captured by Oscar, October 31, 1903." According to legend, Yost sent a letter asking for the jug to be returned, and Cooke wrote in response: "We have your little brown jug; if you want it, you'll have to win it." Yost returned with his team in 1909 to reclaim the jug, and the two teams have awarded the jug to the winner of their annual rivalry game.

=== Michigan 36, Ohio State 0 ===
After suffering its first setback since the 1900 season, Michigan returned to Ann Arbor for a November 7 game against Ohio State. The Wolverines defeated the Buckeyes 36 to 0. On the opening drive, Herb Graver had runs of 30 and 20 yards, the latter resulting in the game's first touchdown. Within the game's first five minutes, Michigan had scored its second touchdown. Graver scored Michigan's third touchdown on a 30-yard run, but the Ohio State defense grew more stubborn. The first half ended with a score of 36 to 0. The Michigan Alumnus credited Gregory's work on the line and long runs by Herb Graver with Michigan's edge in the first half. Graver led the Michigan scoring with five first half touchdowns, good for 25 points.

Michigan drove to the Ohio State five-yard line on the opening drive of the second half, but lost the ball on a fumble. Later in the second half, Jones of Ohio recovered a fumble by Fred Norcross, and ran the ball over a clear field toward the Michigan goal. Curtis Redden caught up with Jones and tackled him at Michigan's 20-yard line. '"The Michigan Alumnus" cited Redden as having on several occasions been "the one saving element in Michigan's defense." No points were scored by either team in the second half, as "the men from Columbus played the Varsity to a standstill." The game consisted of 55 minutes of playing time – a 30-minute first half and a 25-minute second half.

Through the first nine games of the 1903 season, the Wolverines scored 479 points and had played between 386 and 406 minutes.

Player	Position	Starter	Touchdowns	Extra points	Field goals	Points
Herb Graver	Right halfback	yes	5	0	0	25
Tom Hammond	Right end	yes	0	6	0	6
Joe Curtis	Left tackle	yes	1	0	0	5

=== Michigan 16, Wisconsin 0 ===
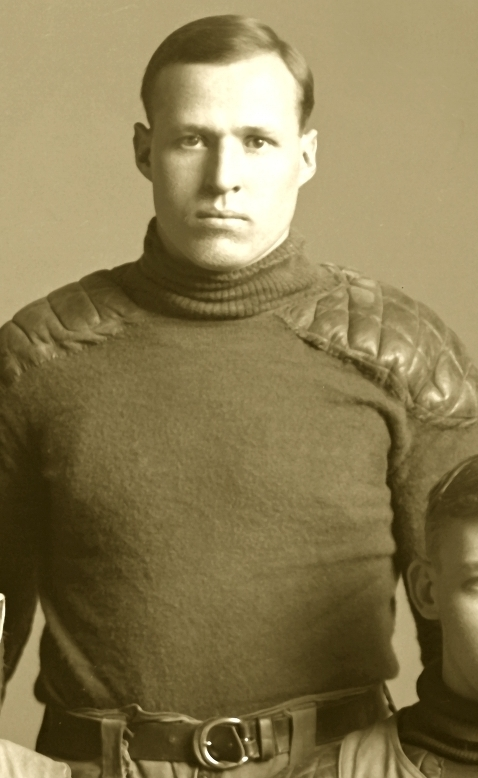
"Big Joe" Curtis started all 12 games at left tackle for the 1903 team.

On November 14, 1903, Michigan played Wisconsin in a game starting at 2:00 pm on Ferry Field. Michigan won the game, played in 35-minute halves, by a score of 16 to 0. The New York Times called it "one of the cleanest football games every played here." Although Michigan outgained Wisconsin 165 yards to 55 yards and kept the ball "almost constantly in Wisconsin's territory," the first half ended in a scoreless tie.

Michigan continued to have difficulty reaching Wisconsin's goal in the second half and relied on Tom Hammond to kick two field goals, good for five points each under 1903 rules. Hammond's first field goal came on a place-kick from the 24-yard line. The snap to James was high, but he placed it accurately and "Hammond made as beautiful a field goal as was ever seen on any grounds." Hammond's final field goal came on "a marvelous place-kick from Wisconsin's 45-yard line." Herb Graver accounted for Michigan's only long runs, and the sole touchdown was scored by Joe Maddock on a "mass play" from the five-yard line. The Michigan Alumnus noted that the game was marked by "thorough sportsmanship" and played in "propitious weather" in front of a crowd of approximately 8,000 estimated to be the second largest ever assembled at Ferry Field. The Alumnus also offered the following comparison with Yost's 1902 team: "It was the impression of many alumni who were for the first time viewing the men in action, that in speed and certainly the team's offensive play fell somewhat below the standard of last years' eleven."

Through the first ten games of the 1903 season, the Wolverines scored 495 points and had played between 456 and 476 minutes.

Player	Position	Starter	Touchdowns	Extra points	Field goals	Points
Tom Hammond	Right end	yes	0	1	2	11
Joe Maddock	Right tackle	yes	1	0	0	5

=== Michigan 42, Oberlin 0 ===
Michigan played its final home game against Oberlin College. Michigan's starting backfield did not play in the game in order to avoid injuries prior to the Chicago game. In 45 minutes of playing time (first half of 25 minutes, second half of 20 minutes), Michigan scored 42 points. Wolfe, from Hyde Park, Illinois, made his first appearance for Michigan and was credited with the longest run of the game, 25 yards. Joe Curtis led the scoring with 16 points on three touchdowns and a point after touchdown kick. Tom Hammond missed three kicks for field goals. Oberlin had only two first downs in the game. University of Chicago coach Amos Alonzo Stagg attended the game and opined afterward that he picked Michigan as a slight favorite against his own team on Thanksgiving Day.

Through the first 11 games of the 1903 season, the Wolverines scored 537 points and had played between 501 and 521 minutes.

Player	Position	Starter	Touchdowns	Extra points	Field goals	Points
Joe Curtis	Left tackle	yes	3	1	0	16
Tom Hammond	Right end	yes	1	6	0	11
Fred Norcross	Quarterback	yes	1	0	0	5
Hal Weeks	Left halfback	yes	1	0	0	5
Duncan Thompson	Right halfback	no	1	0	0	5

=== Michigan 28, Chicago 0 ===
Michigan concluded the 1903 season with its traditional rivalry game in Chicago against Amos Alonzo Stagg's Chicago Maroons. The New York Times reported that the game was attended by a record-setting crowd: "All records for attendance were broken, fully 20,000 enthusiastic spectators braving a heavy snowfall to see the game." Another account placed the attendance at 15,000. The Michigan Alumnus noted that Michigan men regarded Chicago as "their dearest rival," and the Thanksgiving Day game at Marshall Field marked the culmination of the season.

A blizzard threatened cancellation of the game, but the snow stopped suddenly and the wind died down in the early afternoon. The game was commenced at 2:00 pm after seven or eight inches of snow were cleared from the field.

Stagg's 1903 team featured three future College Football Hall of Fame inductees: Walter Eckersall at quarterback, Hugo Bezdek at right halfback, and Tiny Maxwell at right tackle. All-American Frederick A. Speik also played at left end for the 1903 Maroons. The two teams were expected to be evenly matched, but the game, played on a snowy and slippery field, proved to be one-sided. Chicago was handicapped by the illness of Coach Stagg who directed the game from a closed carriage where he lay "bundled up in blankets."

Michigan scored on every drive in the first half, save one, and Chicago made only one first down in the first half. Eckersall's defensive play was praised in accounts of the game, though, on one play, Willie Heston eluded Eckersall "by a well-timed hurdle" for a 20-yard gain. Heston scored two touchdowns, but Tom Hammond was the leading scorer with 13 points on two field goals (five points each) and three point after touchdown kicks. The game was played in halves of 35 and 20 minutes, with the second half being cut short to avoid playing after darkness had fallen.

Walter Camp attended the game, watching from the sidelines. Camp offered the following comments:

"The helping of the men on the Michigan team was high-grade football. Their work at helping the man with the ball was as good as that displayed in any game I have seen this season. This is the first western game I have witnessed this year. I was particularly impressed with the work of Heston as a halfback."

The Chicago Daily Tribune opened its game coverage, "The premature blizzard which descended on Chicago yesterday made it anything but an ideal football day, but that driving snow storm was gentleness itself compared to what was in store for Chicago's two football elevens." The Detroit Free Press called it "the most severe drubbing ever administered to the Maroons in the history of football of that institution." Noted sports writer Joe S. Jackson wrote: "Chicago was not beaten – it was run over, buffeted about, almost made the sport of its opponents at times . . ."

The Michigan team was the guest of the Studebaker Theatre the evening after the game.

At a post-season dinner, Fielding Yost said that he regarded Michigan's play in the Chicago game to be "the best he had ever seen by a Michigan team during his three years here." Michigan's captain, Curtis Redden, opined that the spectators saw "the finest exhibition of speed and team work ever seen in the West."

Through all 12 games of the 1903 season, the Wolverines scored 565 points and played between 556 and 576 minutes.

Player	Position	Starter	Touchdowns	Extra points	Field goals	Points
Tom Hammond	Right end	yes	0	3	2	13
Willie Heston	Left halfback	yes	2	0	0	10
Herb Graver	Right halfback	yes	1	0	0	5

== Post-season ==
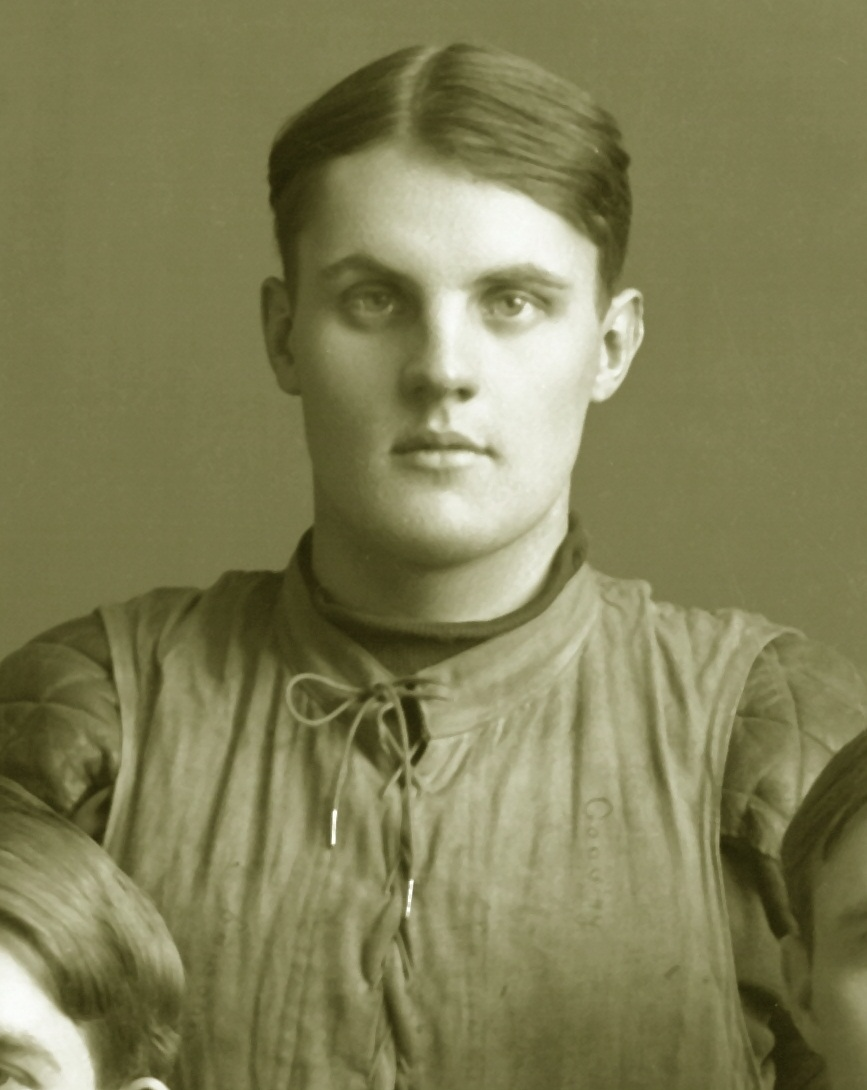
Cecil Gooding

Prior to the Chicago game, Fielding Yost announced that he had consented to coach the Michigan football team for another year in 1904. The Michigan Alumnus applauded the announcement: "Michigan football teams, under Coach Yost's regime have never lost and have always played fair. Every loyal Michigan man will hail Mr. Yost's decision with delight, and count his stay a guarantee of a fourth season of clean and successful football."

On December 16, 1903, the team's official portrait was taken, and Willie Heston was elected captain of the 1904 team. That night, local businessmen hosted a dinner for the team. Team captain Redden summarized the 1903 season: "With the poorest prospects and in the face of the greatest obstacles, to achieve the success she did – Michigan may well look back to the season of nineteen hundred and three as one of the most brilliant in her football history."

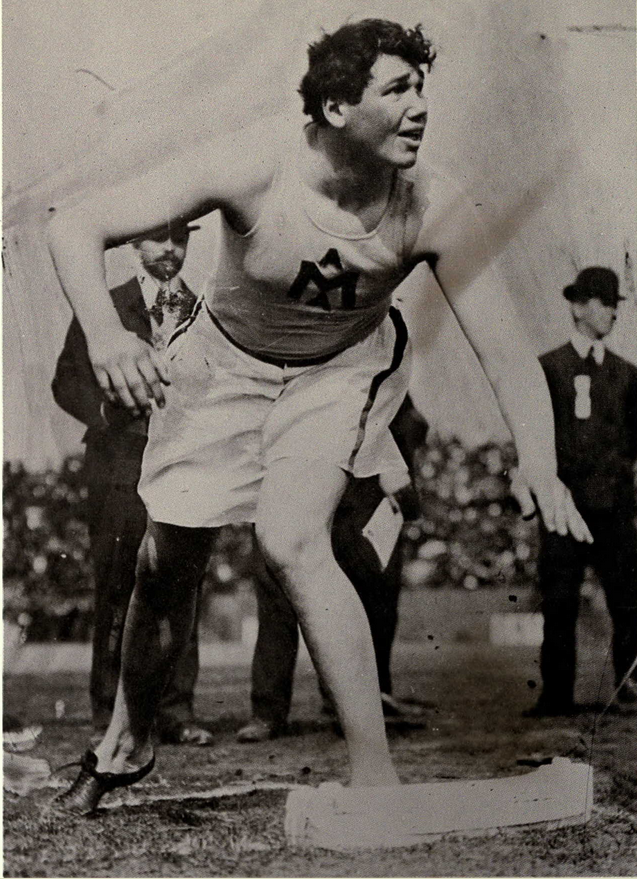
Ralph Rose, whose recruitment caused controversy, went on to win gold medals in the shot put at the 1904, 1908 and 1912 Summer Olympic games.

The 1903 season saw the final appearance of several players, including Curtis Redden, Joe Maddock, George Gregory, and Herb Graver. Nevertheless, with Willie Heston, Joe Curtis, Tom Hammond, and Fred Norcross returning, The Michigan Alumnus noted that the promise for the 1904 season was good.

Cecil Gooding contracted typhoid fever following the Minnesota game in late November 1903. It was believed that he contracted the illness from drinking the water while in Chicago for the game. He died five weeks later. He was the first Michigan Wolverines football player to die while attending the school. Following his death, The Michigan Alumnus wrote: "He had striven conscientiously to perfect himself in the game and earned the respect of coaches, players and spectators. He was a reliable, hard-working guard who never under any circumstances played anything but a sportsmanlike game. He was a man off the field and on."

=== Ralph Rose controversy ===
In the spring of 1904, a controversy arose over allegations published in the San Francisco Chronicle that Yost had promised Ralph Rose, a 6-foot, 6-inch, 250-pound athlete from California, a job in the library and membership in a fraternity if he enrolled at Michigan. Yost denied the charges, and The Michigan Alumnus wrote that student positions in the library paid no more than 12 1/2 cents per hour, and Rose had received no such job in any event. Nor had he been made a member of any fraternity. In the end, Rose never played for Michigan's football team. Despite his size and strength, he lacked the speed to compete effectively in Yost's fast-paced style of football. Instead, Rose competed in the shot put for Michigan, setting a new world's record in May 1904. He went on to win the gold medal in the shot put at the 1904, 1908 and 1912 Summer Olympics and died in 1913 from typhoid fever at age 28.

== Players ==
=== Varsity letter winners ===
The following 12 players received varsity "M" letters for their participation on the 1903 football team:

Player	Position	Games started	Hometown
Joe Curtis	Left tackle	12	Brooklyn, New York
Cecil Gooding	Right guard	12	Ann Arbor, Michigan
Herb Graver	Right halfback Right end	8; 1	Chicago, Illinois
George W. Gregory	Center	10	Seattle, Washington
Tom Hammond	Fullback; Right end	8; 3	Chicago, Illinois
Willie Heston	Left halfback	8	Grants Pass, Oregon
Harry James	Quarterback	8	Detroit, Michigan
Frank Longman	Right end Fullback; Right halfback	7; 3; 1	Battle Creek, Michigan
Joe Maddock	Right tackle	9	East Jordan, Michigan
Fred Norcross	Quarterback; Left halfback Left end Right halfback	4; 3; 1; 1	Menominee, Michigan
Curtis Redden	Left end	11	Rossville, Illinois
Henry Schulte	Left guard	12	Jefferson Barracks, Missouri

=== Scoring leaders ===
Player	Touchdowns	Extra points	Field goals	Points
Tom Hammond	15	63	5	163
Herb Graver	15	1	0	76
Willie Heston	14	0	0	70
Joe Curtis	8	13	0	53
Joe Maddock	10	0	0	50
Duncan Thompson	10	0	0	50
Fred Norcross	9	0	0	45
Rolla Bigelow	5	0	0	25

=== Non-letter winners and reserves ===
- Harold Baker, Rochester, New York
- Rolla Bigelow, Owosso, Michigan – started 1 game at fullback, 1 game at left halfback
- Ray Forrest Barnett, Ann Arbor, Michigan
- Harry S. Bartlett, Detroit, Michigan
- David E. Beardsley, Kalamazoo, Michigan
- Walter Coooley Becker, Chicago, Illinois
- Charles A. Briggs, Red Oak, Iowa
- William Dennison Clark, Detroit, Michigan
- Carl H. Clement, Toledo, Ohio
- James DePree, Grand Rapids, Michigan – started 1 game at right halfback
- Edward W. Dickey, Weiser, Idaho
- Francis J. Dingeman, Detroit, Michigan
- Frank Langdon Doty, Pontiac, Michigan
- David L. Dunlap, Hopkinton, Iowa – started 1 game at right end
- George Palmer Edmonds, Wayne, Michigan – started 1 game at right tackle
- Walter L. Eyke, Muskegon, Michigan – started 2 games at right tackle
- Glenn R.C. Faling, Toledo, Ohio
- John Garrels, Detroit, Michigan
- Edward P. "Ted" Hammond, Detroit, Michigan – started 2 games at center
- Harry S. Hammond, Chicago, IL
- John F. Hincks, Manistee, Michigan
- Howard Howie, Sault Ste. Marie, Michigan
- Paul J. Jones, Youngstown, Ohio
- Ross H. Kidston, La Grange, Illinois
- John F. Lewis, Covington, Indiana
- Earl M. Nisen, Union Grove, Wisconsin
- Harry E. Patrick, Detroit, Michigan
- Eugene E. Person, Buffalo, New York
- George Martin Read, Augusta, Illinois
- Forest Don Redden, Rossville, Illinois
- Mason Pittman Rumney, Detroit, Michigan
- Rueben S. Schmidt, Los Angeles, California
- Fred Schule, Chicago, Illinois
- Robert P. Shorts, Mt. Pleasant, Michigan
- Duncan Thomson, Chicago, Illinois – started 1 game at right halfback
- Hal Weeks, Allegan, Michigan – started 1 game at left halfback
- William R. Weeks, Allegan, Michigan
- Roswell Murray Wendell, Detroit, Michigan
- Paul Work, Elkhart, Indiana
- Harry A. Workman, Chicago, Illinois

=== Coaching personnel ===
- Fielding H. Yost, head coach
- Dan McGugin, assistant coach
- Keene Fitzpatrick, trainer
- Charles A. Baird, athletic director
- Thomas B. Roberts, manager

== Awards and honors ==
- Captain: Curtis Redden
- All-Americans: William Heston (WC-1), Herb Graver (WC-3), Curtis Redden (WC-3; SA-1)
- All-Western: Joseph Maddock (Walter Camp, Chicago Record-Herald), William Heston (Walter Camp, Chicago Record-Herald), Curtis Redden (Walter Camp, Chicago Record-Herald), Herb Graver (Chicago Record-Herald)
