= Fred Schacht =

American football player, coach, and medical doctor

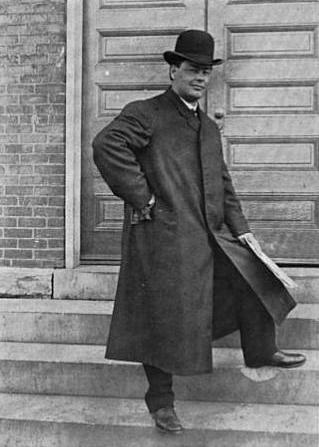
- Schacht at Kentucky in 1905

Biographical details
- Born: c. 1875; Minneapolis, Minnesota, U.S.
- Died: December 1, 1906 (aged 31); Seattle, Washington, U.S.

Playing career
- 1903: Minnesota
- Position: Tackle

Coaching career (HC unless noted)
- 1904–1905: Kentucky State College

Head coaching record
- Overall: 15–4–1

Accomplishments and honors

Awards
- Consensus All-American (1903); Third-team All-American (1902); First-team All-Western (1903)

Frederick E. Schacht (c. 1875 – December 1, 1906) was an American college football coach, player, and medical doctor. He served as the head football coach at Kentucky State College—now known as the University of Kentucky—from 1904 to 1905, compiling a record of 15–4–1.

== Early life and college ==
A native of Minneapolis, Schacht joined the United States Army during the Spanish–American War and served with the 13th Minnesota Volunteers. He then attended the University of Minnesota, and was initiated as a member of the Nu Sigma Nu professional medical fraternity on March 9, 1901. He played on the football team as a tackle in 1903, and the 216-pound Schacht was reportedly "a terror on offense." He starred in Minnesota's 1903 victory over Wisconsin, but gained his greatest acclaim for his role in that season's game against Michigan. Schacht broke three ribs shortly before the game, but refused to go to the hospital and showed up beforehand with his body "encased in a steel harness." Despite the broken ribs, he carried the ball three times for 40-, 50- and 60-yard gains after the kickoff. The contest ended in a tie, which made it the first game Michigan had not won in three years, with Schacht being "hailed throughout the west as the greatest tackle of a decade." After the season, he was named to several All-America teams: Caspar Whitney's first team, Walter Camp's second team, and Fielding H. Yost's second team. Schacht received a Doctor of Medicine degree from Minnesota in 1903.

== University of Kentucky ==
At graduation, he worked at the City Hospital in Minneapolis. Within a year Schacht soon moved to Fergus Falls, Minnesota. From 1904 to 1905, he served as the head football coach at the University of Kentucky. During the first year of his tenure, a controversy erupted before the Thanksgiving Day game against bitter cross-town rival Transylvania University. Kentucky protested the eligibility of several Transylvania players, which prompted Professor A. P. Fairhurst of the opponent's athletic committee to pen an article in the Lexington Herald titled "Shut Up and Play Ball". In it, he sarcastically wrote that Transylvania would allow Kentucky to draw players "from the four quarters of the earth and from the fifth quarter if you can find it gather them from all the tribes and kindred of the earth ... Hottentots, Flat-head Indians, Patagonians, Native Australians, Esquimaux, New Yorkers, Danvillians, Cincinnatians, Hoodoos, Burgoos, Whatnots, Topnots ... the more the merrier". The next day, the Herald published an article from the Kentucky Intercollegiate Athletic Association titled "Protests Erased From Slate—Game Will Be Played" in which it declared the Transylvania players eligible. Kentucky won the game easily, 21–4.

Kentucky struggled the following season, and was shut out, 82–0, by Saint Louis. Controversy arose prior to the Thanksgiving rivalry against Transylvania when Kentucky again protested the eligibility of some opposing players. This time, however, neither school could come to an agreement, and the game was cancelled altogether. Transylvania scheduled Ohio Wesleyan instead, while Kentucky held elections for the next year's team captains and disbanded for the season. Kentucky amassed a 15–4–1 record during his tenure.

== Later life ==
On November 26, 1904, he married Sophia Gloria née Weise in St. Louis, Missouri. In 1905, he opened a drug store in Burlington, Washington. After several months of illness, Schacht died at the Providence Hospital in Seattle on December 1, 1906, at the age of 31. It was the opinion of the attending physician that overtraining during his football career was responsible for a weakened heart that resulted in his death. Another account states that he died from Bright's disease. Minnesota's football coach Dr. Henry L. Williams denied suggestions that the death was the result of overtraining.

== Head coaching record ==
| Year | Team | Overall | Conference | Standing | Bowl/playoffs |
|---|---|---|---|---|---|
Kentucky State College Blue and White (Southern Intercollegiate Athletic Association) (1904)
| 1904 | Kentucky State College | 9–1 | 2–0 | 3rd | |
Kentucky State College Blue and White (Independent) (1905)
| 1905 | Kentucky State College | 6–3–1 | | | |
| Kentucky State College: | | 15–4–1 | 2–0 | | |
| Total: | | 15–4–1 | | | |
