= Little Brown Jug (college football trophy) =

Michigan–Minnesota football rivalry

Michigan–Minnesota football rivalry
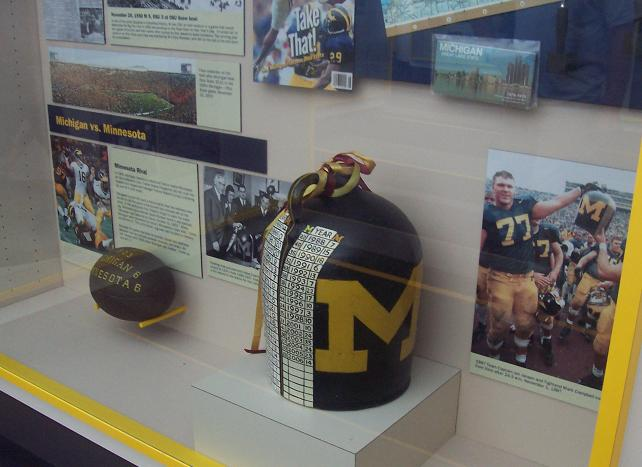
- Replica of the Little Brown Jug on display in Ann Arbor, Michigan in 2007. The real jug is kept in storage.

- Michigan Wolverines Minnesota Golden Gophers
- First meeting: October 17, 1892; Minnesota, 14–6
- Latest meeting: October 3, 2026; Minnesota, 20–14
- Next meeting: TBD
- Trophy: Little Brown Jug

Statistics
- Total meetings: 107
- All-time series: Michigan leads, 78–26–3 (.743)
- Trophy series: Michigan leads, 74–24–2 (.750)
- Largest victory: Michigan, 58–0 (2011)
- Longest win streak: Michigan, 16 (1987–2004)
- Current win streak: Minnesota, 1 (2026–present)

Locations of Michigan and Minnesota

The Little Brown Jug is a trophy contested between the Michigan Wolverines football team of the University of Michigan and the Minnesota Golden Gophers football team of the University of Minnesota. The Little Brown Jug is an earthenware jug that serves as a trophy awarded to the winner of the game. It is one of the oldest and most played rivalries in American college football, dating to 1892. The Little Brown Jug is the most regularly exchanged rivalry trophy in college football, the oldest trophy game in FBS college football, and the second oldest rivalry trophy overall, next to the 1899 Territorial Cup (which did not become a travelling/exchange trophy until 2001), contested between Arizona and Arizona State (which did not become a four-year college until 1925).

Both universities are founding members of the Big Ten Conference. As a result of the Big Ten not playing a complete round-robin schedule, Michigan and Minnesota occasionally did not play. In 2011, with the conference's expansion and initiation of divisional play, Michigan and Minnesota were both placed in the Big Ten's Legends division under the new two-division alignment, guaranteeing that they would face each other every year. However, when the conference expanded again three years later, the teams were split into opposite divisions (Michigan in the East, Minnesota in the West). The conference stated that there would be only one protected annual crossover matchup under the new alignment (Indiana vs. Purdue for the Old Oaken Bucket). Similarly, the series was not included in the list of protected rivalries released by the Big Ten when it adjusted its scheduling model in 2024 after further expansion. As a result, although Michigan and Minnesota play each other sporadically as conference opponents, their series is not contested annually.

Minnesota is the current holder of the jug with a 20–14 victory on October 3, 2026. Through the end of the 2026 season, Michigan leads the series, 78–26–3.

== Series history ==
=== Pre-Brown Jug ===
The teams met for the first time in 1892 in Minneapolis, with Minnesota prevailing 14–6. Michigan and Minnesota played five more games over the next decade, Michigan winning four of those five.

=== 1903 game ===
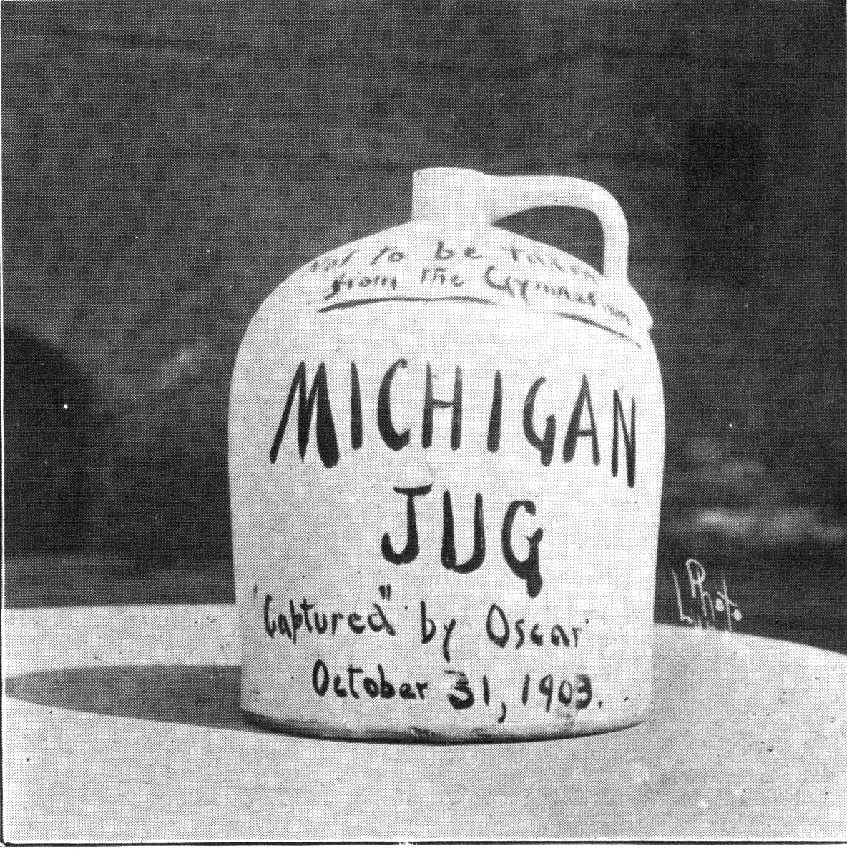
Photograph of the "Michigan Jug" (which was neither little nor brown) from the 1909 Michiganensian

The earthenware jug, originally used by Michigan coach Fielding H. Yost, is painted with the victories of each team. The name most likely originates in the 1869 song of the same name by Joseph Winner.

After Yost took over coaching the Wolverines in 1901, the team went on to win 28 straight games. In the meantime, Minnesota had been assembling teams themselves, and Gopher fans were excited about possibly ending the Wolverines' streak.

When Yost and the team came into Minneapolis for the 1903 game, student manager Thomas B. Roberts was told to purchase something to carry water. Yost was somewhat concerned that Gopher fans might contaminate his water supply. Roberts purchased a five-gallon jug for 30¢ from a local variety store in Dinkytown. The jug itself is known as a Red Wing Pottery "five gallon beehive jug", and was made in Red Wing, Minnesota.

Twenty thousand fans watched the matchup between the two teams in an overflowing Northrop Field. Minnesota held the "point-a-minute" squad to just one touchdown, but hadn't yet managed to score themselves. Finally, late in the second half, the Gophers reached the endzone to tie the game at 6. As clouds from an impending storm hung overhead, Minnesota fans stormed the field in celebration. Order could not be restored and the game had to be called with two minutes remaining. The Wolverines walked off the field, leaving the jug behind in the locker room of the University of Minnesota Armory.

The next day custodian Oscar Munson brought the jug to L. J. Cooke, head of the Minnesota athletics department, and declared in a thick Scandinavian accent: "Yost left his jug." Exactly how Munson came to possess the jug is a mystery. Some accounts say that Munson purposely stole the jug in the chaos that ended the game, although most believe it was accidentally left behind. Thomas Roberts, writing in 1956, stated that the jug had served its purpose, so he intentionally left it sitting on the field.

Still, Cooke and Munson were excited to have this bit of memorabilia, proceeding to paint it brown (it had originally been putty-colored and currently is painted half blue, which is Michigan's color) and commemorate the day by writing "Michigan Jug –; Captured by Oscar, October 31, 1903" on the side along with the score "Michigan 6, Minnesota 6". Minnesota's score was written many times larger than that of Michigan.

When the two schools met in football again in 1909, Cooke and the Minnesota team captain decided that playing for the jug "might be material to build up a fine tradition between the two institutions." When presented with this idea, Yost and Michigan's captain agreed, and has been a travelling trophy since. Michigan took home the jug in 1909 and 1910. Minnesota and Michigan met up again in 1919 after Michigan rejoined the Big Ten Conference, marking the first year that Minnesota won the jug outright.

=== Other notable games ===
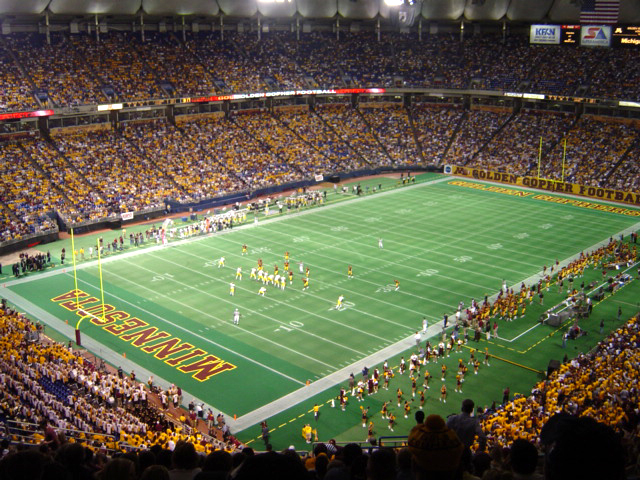
The 2003 edition of the battle for the Little Brown Jug. This particular game was famous for being the biggest comeback in Michigan football history.

"The Battle of Giants" occurred in 1940, with undefeated Minnesota facing undefeated Michigan on November 9, 1940. Minnesota won 7–6. Minnesota went on to go 8–0 and win the national championship.

In 1977, Minnesota stunned #1 Michigan 16–0; it was the only loss of the regular season for the Wolverines as they advanced to (and lost) the 1978 Rose Bowl to the Washington Huskies 27-20. The Gophers would have to wait quite some time for their next home victory though. Forty nine years later after losing 18 consecutive games, between 3 different stadiums Minnesota called home. The Golden Gophers would finally end the drought with a 20-14 victory over a College Football Playoff hopeful Michigan Wolverine team.

In 1986, Minnesota was regarded as an easy victory for #2 Michigan as a 25-point underdog. With two minutes to go and the game tied at 17, Minnesota quarterback Rickey Foggie scrambled to put Chip Lohmiller in position to kick the winning field goal. The Gophers took home the Little Brown Jug from Michigan for the first time since 1977. Similarly, it was Michigan's only loss in the regular season on their way to losing the 1987 Rose Bowl.

The 2003 game was one of the most highly anticipated Michigan–Minnesota matchups in years. This was the 100th Anniversary of the 1903 game. The Little Brown Jug was featured on the cover of the Michigan Football Media Guide. Minnesota was ranked #17 and Michigan was ranked #20 with the game at Hubert H. Humphrey Metrodome. Down 28–7, Michigan put together a comeback in the fourth quarter to win 38–35. Michigan advanced to (and lost) the 2004 Rose Bowl. The next season, in another highly anticipated game, #14 Michigan came back again in the fourth quarter to defeat #13 Minnesota 27–24. Michigan advanced to (and lost) the 2005 Rose Bowl. In 2013, the 2003 game was singled out as one of the biggest setbacks to the Gopher football team rebuilding since their last Big Ten Championship in 1967.

Michigan has dominated the series since 1968, during which Minnesota has held the jug only five times. On October 8, 2005, Minnesota claimed the jug for the first time since 1986, defeating Michigan 23–20 on a last second field goal in Ann Arbor, Michigan. The Wolverines grabbed the trophy right back the next year on September 30, with a 28–14 victory in Minneapolis.

Michigan won all 12 meetings with Minnesota at the Hubert H. Humphrey Metrodome, which the Gophers shared with the Minnesota Twins and Minnesota Vikings from 1982 through 2008.

== Accomplishments by the two rivals ==
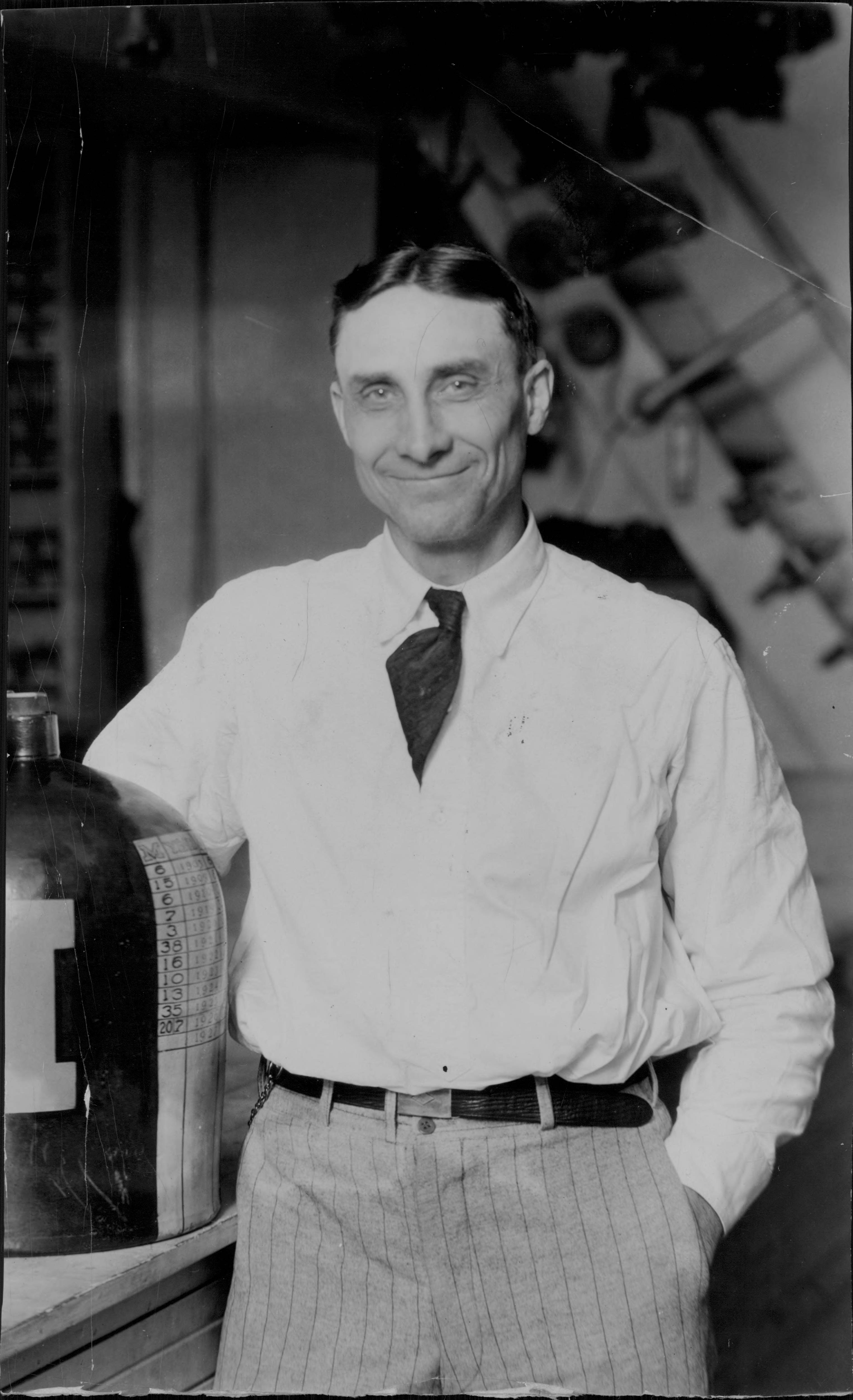
Oscar Munson with the Little Brown Jug (1928)

Team	Michigan	Minnesota
National titles	12	7
CFP appearances	3	0
Bowl appearances	51	20
Postseason bowl record	21–28	8–12
Rose Bowl Game appearances	20	2
Rose Bowl Game wins	9	1
Big Ten divisional titles	3	0
Big Ten titles	45	18
Consensus All-Americans	87	33
Heisman Trophies	3	1
All-time program record	1004–353–36	710–533–44
All-time win percentage	.729	.569

== Game results ==
Michigan victories	Minnesota victories	Tie games

No.	Date	Location	Winner	Score
1	October 17, 1892	Minneapolis, MN	Minnesota	14–6
2	October 28, 1893	Ann Arbor, MI	Minnesota	34–20
3	November 23, 1895	Ann Arbor, MI	Michigan	20–0
4	November 7, 1896	Minneapolis, MN	Michigan	6–4
5	November 13, 1897	Ann Arbor, MI	Michigan	14–0
6	November 27, 1902	Ann Arbor, MI	Michigan	23–6
7	October 31, 1903	Minneapolis, MN	Tie	6–6
8	November 20, 1909	Minneapolis, MN	Michigan	15–6
9	November 19, 1910	Ann Arbor, MI	Michigan	6–0
10	November 22, 1919	Ann Arbor, MI	Minnesota	34–7
11	November 20, 1920	Minneapolis, MN	Michigan	3–0
12	November 19, 1921	Ann Arbor, MI	Michigan	38–0
13	November 25, 1922	Minneapolis, MN	Michigan	16–7
14	November 24, 1923	Ann Arbor, MI	Michigan	10–0
15	November 1, 1924	Minneapolis, MN	Michigan	13–0
16	November 21, 1925	Ann Arbor, MI	Michigan	35–0
17	October 16, 1926	Ann Arbor, MI	Michigan	20–0
18	November 20, 1926	Minneapolis, MN	Michigan	7–6
19	November 19, 1927	Ann Arbor, MI	Minnesota	13–7
20	November 16, 1929	Minneapolis, MN	Michigan	7–6
21	November 15, 1930	Ann Arbor, MI	Michigan	7–0
22	November 21, 1931	Ann Arbor, MI	Michigan	6–0
23	November 19, 1932	Minneapolis, MN	Michigan	3–0
24	November 18, 1933	Ann Arbor, MI	Tie	0–0
25	November 3, 1934	Minneapolis, MN	Minnesota	34–0
26	November 16, 1935	Ann Arbor, MI	Minnesota	40–0
27	October 17, 1936	Minneapolis, MN	Minnesota	26–0
28	October 16, 1937	Ann Arbor, MI	Minnesota	39–6
29	October 15, 1938	Minneapolis, MN	Minnesota	7–6
30	November 11, 1939	Ann Arbor, MI	Minnesota	20–7
31	November 9, 1940	Minneapolis, MN	No. 2 Minnesota	7–6
32	October 25, 1941	Ann Arbor, MI	No. 1 Minnesota	7–0
33	October 24, 1942	Minneapolis, MN	No. 13 Minnesota	16–14
34	October 23, 1943	Ann Arbor, MI	No. 10 Michigan	49–6
35	October 7, 1944	Minneapolis, MN	Michigan	28–13
36	November 3, 1945	Ann Arbor, MI	No. 10 Michigan	26–0
37	November 2, 1946	Minneapolis, MN	No. 13 Michigan	21–0
38	October 25, 1947	Ann Arbor, MI	No. 1 Michigan	13–6
39	October 23, 1948	Minneapolis, MN	No. 1 Michigan	27–14
40	October 22, 1949	Ann Arbor, MI	No. 12 Michigan	14–7
41	October 28, 1950	Minneapolis, MN	Tie	7–7
42	October 27, 1951	Ann Arbor, MI	Michigan	54–27
43	October 25, 1952	Ann Arbor, MI	No. 19 Michigan	21–0
44	October 24, 1953	Minneapolis, MN	Minnesota	22–0
45	October 23, 1954	Ann Arbor, MI	Michigan	34–0
46	October 22, 1955	Minneapolis, MN	No. 1 Michigan	14–13
47	October 27, 1956	Ann Arbor, MI	Minnesota	20–7
48	October 26, 1957	Minneapolis, MN	No. 20 Michigan	24–7
49	October 25, 1958	Ann Arbor, MI	Michigan	20–19
50	October 24, 1959	Minneapolis, MN	Michigan	14–6
51	October 22, 1960	Ann Arbor, MI	No. 6 Minnesota	10–0
52	October 28, 1961	Minneapolis, MN	Minnesota	23–20
53	October 27, 1962	Ann Arbor, MI	Minnesota	17–0
54	October 26, 1963	Minneapolis, MN	Minnesota	6–0

No.	Date	Location	Winner	Score
55	October 24, 1964	Ann Arbor, MI	Michigan	19–12
56	October 23, 1965	Minneapolis, MN	Minnesota	14–13
57	October 22, 1966	Ann Arbor, MI	Michigan	49–0
58	October 28, 1967	Minneapolis, MN	Minnesota	20–15
59	October 26, 1968	Ann Arbor, MI	No. 12 Michigan	33–20
60	October 25, 1969	Minneapolis, MN	Michigan	35–9
61	October 24, 1970	Ann Arbor, MI	No. 5 Michigan	39–13
62	October 23, 1971	Minneapolis, MN	No. 3 Michigan	35–7
63	October 28, 1972	Ann Arbor, MI	No. 5 Michigan	42–0
64	October 27, 1973	Minneapolis, MN	No. 4 Michigan	34–7
65	October 26, 1974	Ann Arbor, MI	No. 3 Michigan	49–0
66	November 1, 1975	Minneapolis, MN	No. 7 Michigan	28–21
67	October 30, 1976	Ann Arbor, MI	No. 1 Michigan	45–0
68	October 22, 1977	Minneapolis, MN	Minnesota	16–0
69	October 28, 1978	Ann Arbor, MI	No. 8 Michigan	42–10
70	October 13, 1979	Ann Arbor, MI	No. 11 Michigan	31–21
71	October 18, 1980	Minneapolis, MN	Michigan	37–14
72	October 31, 1981	Minneapolis, MN	No. 15 Michigan	34–13
73	October 30, 1982	Ann Arbor, MI	No. 20 Michigan	52–14
74	November 12, 1983	Minneapolis, MN	No. 9 Michigan	58–10
75	November 10, 1984	Ann Arbor, MI	Michigan	31–7
76	November 16, 1985	Minneapolis, MN	No. 8 Michigan	48–7
77	November 15, 1986	Ann Arbor, MI	Minnesota	20–17
78	November 7, 1987	Minneapolis, MN	Michigan	30–20
79	November 5, 1988	Ann Arbor, MI	No. 14 Michigan	22–7
80	November 18, 1989	Minneapolis, MN	No. 3 Michigan	49–15
81	November 17, 1990	Ann Arbor, MI	No. 16 Michigan	35–18
82	October 25, 1991	Minneapolis, MN	No. 4 Michigan	52–6
83	October 24, 1992	Ann Arbor, MI	No. 3 Michigan	63–13
84	November 13, 1993	Minneapolis, MN	Michigan	58–7
85	November 12, 1994	Ann Arbor, MI	No. 19 Michigan	38–22
86	October 28, 1995	Ann Arbor, MI	No. 9 Michigan	52–17
87	October 26, 1996	Minneapolis, MN	No. 10 Michigan	44–10
88	November 1, 1997	Ann Arbor, MI	No. 4 Michigan	24–3
89	October 31, 1998	Minneapolis, MN	No. 22 Michigan	15–10
90	November 10, 2001	Ann Arbor, MI	No. 12 Michigan	31–10
91	November 9, 2002	Minneapolis, MN	No. 13 Michigan	41–24
92	October 10, 2003	Minneapolis, MN	No. 20 Michigan	38–35
93	October 9, 2004	Ann Arbor, MI	No. 14 Michigan	27–24
94	October 8, 2005	Ann Arbor, MI	Minnesota	23–20
95	September 30, 2006	Minneapolis, MN	No. 6 Michigan	28–14
96	October 27, 2007	Ann Arbor, MI	No. 19 Michigan	34–10
97	November 8, 2008	Minneapolis, MN	Michigan	29–6
98	October 1, 2011	Ann Arbor, MI	No. 19 Michigan	58–0
99	November 3, 2012	Minneapolis, MN	Michigan	35–13
100	October 5, 2013	Ann Arbor, MI	No. 19 Michigan	42–13
101	September 27, 2014	Ann Arbor, MI	Minnesota	30–14
102	October 31, 2015	Minneapolis, MN	No. 15 Michigan	29–26
103	November 4, 2017	Ann Arbor, MI	Michigan	33–10
104	October 24, 2020	Minneapolis, MN	No. 18 Michigan	49–24
105	October 7, 2023	Minneapolis, MN	No. 2 Michigan	52–10
106	September 28, 2024	Ann Arbor, MI	No. 12 Michigan	27–24
107	October 3, 2026	Minneapolis, MN	Minnesota	20–14
Series: Michigan leads 78–26–3

Note: Michigan and Minnesota played twice in 1926 (on October 16 in Ann Arbor and on November 20 in Minneapolis) due to conference scheduling issues for Minnesota.

== See also ==
- List of NCAA college football rivalry games
- List of most-played college football series in NCAA Division I
- Lions–Vikings rivalry

== Bibliography ==
- Gruver, Edward (2002), Nitschke. Lanham:Taylor Trade Publishing. ISBN 1-58979-127-4
