= Purdue wreck =

1903 train collision

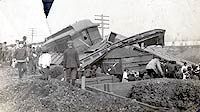
- The remains of the first coach of the Big Four special, where the Purdue football team was seated, lies splintered on and about a coal tender.
- Date: October 31, 1903; 122 years ago
- Location: Indianapolis, Indiana; 39.790°N 86.165°W
- Type: Train wreck (collision)
- Cause: Dispatcher's error.
- Deaths: 17

The Purdue wreck was a railroad train collision in Indianapolis, Indiana, on Saturday, October 31, 1903, between two special trains that killed 17 people, including 14 players of the 1903 Purdue University football team. Team captain and future Indiana governor Harry G. Leslie was initially thought to have died in the accident, but was later revived.

== Trains ==
Two special trains operated by the Cleveland, Cincinnati, Chicago and St. Louis Railway (the "Big Four Railroad") were chartered to carry the Purdue football team and over 1,500 passengers from Lafayette, Indiana, to Indianapolis for the annual Indiana Hoosiers–Purdue Boilermakers football rivalry game. It was to be played for the first time at a "neutral" field at Washington Park in Indianapolis.

The lead special carried 950 passengers, including 600 students. It consisted of Richmond engine No. 350, a coal tender, and 14 coach cars. It was piloted by Engineer William H. Shumaker and Conductor Frank M. Johnson. The second special was pulled by engine No. 183 and carried the remaining 550 passengers. The coal train consisted of switching engine No. 84 and seven 80,000-pound (36,000 kg) coal cars—a total weight of 560,000 lb (250,000 kg). It was piloted by Engineer Smith and Conductor Acres. Witnesses reported special No. 350 was heading southeasterly toward Union Station at a speed of 25 miles per hour (40 km/h) or more, while coal train No. 84 was being pushed northwesterly on the same track en route to North Indianapolis at 5 mph (8.0 km/h).

== Crash ==
Owing to a breakdown in communication later attributed to Big Four Chief Dispatcher H. C. Byers in Kankakee, Illinois, Indianapolis general yard master John Q. Hicks, Engineer Smith, and Conductor Acres were not aware of the two approaching specials. Smith and Acres were pushing their train of coal cars northwest on the main track just as the lead special began rounding the bend at 18th Street. Engineer Shumaker was able to throw No. 350 into reverse and set the brake when he saw the coal train emerge around the bend of the track ahead. He and Conductor Johnson then jumped clear of their engine, but they were not able to prevent the collision at approximately 10:00 am. Engineer Smith was also able to set the brakes on No. 84.

The collision drove engine No. 350 and the lead coal car of the coal train under the second coal car. Witnesses reported the first coach car, where the team, coaches, and others were seated, was "split from end to end, thrown straight up in the air, and fell in splinters and twisted iron on either side of the track." Only the roof and one side of the coach remained recognizable. The body of the second coach car, where members of the marching band and students were seated, was torn from its frame and thrust down the embankment into a gravel pit to the east. The third coach car was thrust over the remains of the engine and coal cars, then on top of the train cars on the siding to the west. Many of the other 11 coach cars derailed but remained upright. During the collision, one member of the team miraculously landed on his feet and was unharmed after being thrown out a window.

After the impact, the uninjured passengers in the coaches further back wasted little time in coming to the aid of the wounded up ahead. Local residents and laborers also rushed to the scene to provide help as they could. According to Joseph Bradfield, then a Purdue student riding in the procession, “We began carrying the people out, the injured ones. There was a line of horse-and-buggies along the whole stretch there for half a mile. We didn’t stop for ceremony; we simply loaded the injured people into the buggies and sent the buggies into town, got them to a hospital [….] There was no ambulance, no cars…” As the survivors of the wreck, including Purdue University President Winthrop E. Stone, comforted the injured and dying, others ran back up the track to stop the next special 15 minutes behind, thereby preventing an even greater tragedy.

== Victims ==
Sixteen passengers in the first coach of the lead special were killed, with thirteen of the dead identified as members of the Purdue football team. A fourteenth player died of his injuries on November 30, 1903, bringing the total death toll to seventeen. At least forty other passengers were injured, including twenty-two varsity and scrub team members.

== Investigation ==
The accident investigation was led by Indianapolis Coroner Harry D. Tutewiler. It opened on Monday November 2, 1903, and concluded with his report and official determination of the accident's cause on November 14. Almost 100 witnesses were interviewed, including 24 on the first day. The coroner determined Big Four Chief Dispatcher H. C. "Bert" Byers in Kankakee, Illinois, was at fault for the accident. The coroner's report exonerated the crews of both trains as well as the general yard master John Q. Hicks, even though it was noted that neither Engineer Shumaker nor Engineer Smith were obeying the speed limit established by the city of Indianapolis, nor did Engineer Shumaker maintain control of his train.

A special train is a train section that is not scheduled, and therefore, not visible to other railroad employees on a published schedule of train movements. The special is considered part of the previous, regularly scheduled train to have preceded it down the same track. The Big Four's operating rules stipulated that the special had the right-of-way over almost all other trains. Therefore, the track was to remain clear during the time the special was expected to pass.

Byers could have communicated there would be two specials that morning in two ways. First, signals could have been attached to the preceding regularly scheduled train from Lafayette to Indianapolis, pulled by engine No. 34, that two additional specials were to follow. Big Four employees would see the signals and know additional unscheduled trains would be passing. Second, the chief dispatcher could have communicated to any yard or station master along the route that two specials would be associated with the scheduled train departing Lafayette, along with the expected times of their arrival at various locations. These yard and station masters would have then ordered the tracks under their control to remain clear of other trains at the times the specials were expected to pass.

Coroner Tutewiler determined that only the station master at Union Station in Indianapolis had received notification from Byers' office that two specials would be arriving that morning from Lafayette. Byers had not notified yard master Hicks, who controlled the yard adjacent to the Mill Street Power House, nor had he notified any other yard or maintenance facility along the route. As a result, Hicks had not notified Smith and Acres about the approaching specials and to remain clear of the main track passing through the yard.

Many witnesses reported the lead special was traveling at least 25 mph (40 km/h) through the yard. Some were watching for the specials to pass because they had heard the team from Purdue would be traveling to Indianapolis that morning. People who lived and worked near the railroad who were familiar with the normal volume and speed of the trains were surprised by the unusual length and speed of the lead special, so they continued to watch the train as it passed. Coroner Tutewiler determined that Shumaker was actually driving special No. 350 at least 30 mph (48 km/h) and No. 84 was moving in the opposite direction at 9 mph (14 km/h). The coroner noted that an Indianapolis ordinance required trains passing through the city to not exceed 4 mph (6.4 km/h). Big Four investigators, Superintendent Paquette of Chicago and General Superintendent J. Q. Van Winkle, who initiated a separate internal investigation just days after the accident, repeatedly made public statements blaming Shumaker and Johnson for causing the accident by using excessive speed and not maintaining control of their train while passing through the Mill Street rail yard. Coroner Tutewiler determined, however, that Big Four dispatchers had given Shumaker and Johnson a time table which required them to maintain elevated speeds to remain on schedule. This was confirmed by the crew of special No. 183, as they had identical orders to remain 15 minutes behind special No. 350 all the way to Union Station. It was also noted that special No. 350 was actually running 10 minutes late, putting additional pressure on Shumaker and Johnson to not fall farther behind schedule.

The crews of neither train saw the opposing train until it was too late. Due to the curve in the track, trains of coal cars and box cars parked on the sidings immediately to the west of the main track blocked their views of the opposing trains. In addition, the coal train was being pushed up the tracks by No. 84, not pulled. The switching engine was on the end of the train opposite from where special No. 350 was approaching. Therefore, Smith and Acres' view of special No. 350 was not only blocked by the trains on the adjacent sidings, but also by the seven coal cars they were pushing.

Despite the findings of the coroner, the Big Four dismissed Engineer Shumaker. Conductor Johnson resigned before he could be dismissed and found employment with another railroad company.

== Memorials ==
Memorial Gymnasium (renamed Felix Haas Hall in 2006) was constructed in 1909 on the Purdue University campus to honor the memory of those who perished. The stairway leading to the east entrance has one step for each of the 17 who died. To mark the centennial of the wreck in 2003, a tunnel in Purdue's Ross–Ade Stadium was dedicated to the victims. The Purdue football team passes through the tunnel four times at each home football game: Before the start of the game, at the end of the first half, returning to the field after half-time, and at the end of the game.

== Present-day accident site and location of the Purdue Wreck ==
Although the section of railroad no longer exists, satellite photographs show traces of the rail bed leading to the accident site. From the northwest to the accident site, the rail bed passes through the Riverside Golf Course and crosses the White River near North White River Parkway East Drive and Rivershore Place. The rail bed continues southeast between Burton Avenue and the Central Canal Trail. The rail bed crosses the canal via a bridge immediately to the north of West 24th Street and Burdsal Parkway. The rail bridge still spans the canal at this location. The rail bed continues southeast onto the property of the Republic Waste Services facility along Langsdale Avenue to Dr. Martin Luther King Jr. Street (previously named Northwestern Avenue).

The present-day accident site is bounded on the north by West 21st Street, on the south by West 16th Street, on the east by the IU Health Methodist Hospital campus, and on the west by West Dr. Martin Luther King Jr. Street, West 18th Street, and Mill Street. Prominent landmarks include IU Methodist Hospital to the east, the Peerless Pump Company to the north, and the Mill Street Substation operated by the Indianapolis Power & Light Company, which is just west of the site of the former Mill Street Power House.

After crossing West Dr. Martin Luther King Jr. Street just south of the entrance to the Peerless Pump Company, the rail bed passes between the Peerless Pump factory grounds and the IP&L Mill Street Substation. It then begins a right turn to the south until reaching Interstate 65. Beyond this point, the rail bed is no longer visible, being covered by the interstate, Senate Boulevard, and the west lawn of IU Health Methodist Hospital. A map of Indianapolis from 1916 shows the tracks continued south across West 17th Street (also known as Holton Place) just west of the Columbia School Supply facility, through a neighborhood to West 16th Street at Lafayette Street, then south along Lafayette Street into the downtown area to Union Station.

Newspaper accounts stated the wreck occurred "near Eighteenth and Mill Streets", while Coroner Tutewiler's official report stated the accident occurred "between Northwestern Avenue and Holton Place". The tracks at this location were east and southeast of the Mill Street Power House. Witnesses who were working in the Columbia School Supply building on West 17th Street stated they went to the windows of the building to watch the lead special pass when they heard it approaching, and watched the wreck happen. The 1916 map shows the tracks crossing West 17th Street immediately west of this business. This places the wreck northwest of the business. The alignment of present-day West 17th Street and Lafayette Street, when compared with the 1916 map, indicate the site of the Columbia School Supply building is at the present-day site of the parking circle at the west entrance of IU Health Methodist Hospital. Newspaper reports also stated much of the wreckage of the lead special's engine and second coach fell into a gravel pit immediately east of the main tracks. The 1916 map shows additional rail sidings at this location, but the majority of the rail yard and the open land east of the yard are north and northwest of the Columbia School Supply building and north of West 17th Street. Businesses and residences occupied both sides of the tracks south of West 17th Street, so the gravel pit was most likely north of West 17th Street and east of the tracks.

Finally, Coroner Tutewiler also noted he interviewed John Bodine. Bodine lived at 1906 Highland Place, which the 1916 map shows as several blocks directly north of the Columbia School Supply facility. Bodine was in the alley to the west of his home, with a view to the southwest across the gravel pit and to the south down the alley. He saw special No. 350 driving down the main track, and also saw the train of coal cars framed by the alley. Bodine also saw the collision of the two trains.

Based on the locations of buildings, landmarks, streets and alleys, and the rail bed seen in the 1916 maps compared to present-day satellite photographs of the same area, the most likely location of the wreck is near the present-day intersection of Senate Boulevard and the west entrance to IU Health Methodist Hospital.

== See also ==
- List of accidents involving sports teams
