= 1905 Western Conference football season =

- Sport: Football
- Number of teams: 9
- Champion: Chicago

Football seasons
- ← 1904 1906 →

1905 Western Conference football standings
	Conf.					Overall
Team	W		L		T	W		L		T
Chicago $	7	–	0	–	0	11	–	0	–	0
Michigan	2	–	1	–	0	12	–	1	–	0
Minnesota	2	–	1	–	0	10	–	1	–	0
Purdue	1	–	1	–	1	6	–	1	–	1
Wisconsin	1	–	2	–	0	8	–	2	–	0
Indiana	0	–	1	–	1	8	–	1	–	1
Iowa	0	–	2	–	0	8	–	2	–	0
Northwestern	0	–	2	–	0	8	–	2	–	1
Illinois	0	–	3	–	0	5	–	4	–	0
$ – Conference champion

The 1905 Western Conference football season was the tenth season of college football played by the member schools of the Western Conference (later known as the Big Ten Conference) and was a part of the 1905 college football season.

The 1905 Chicago Maroons football team won the conference championship, compiled an 11–0 record, and outscored opponents 271 to 5. The Maroons were retroactively named national champions by the Billingsley Report, the Helms Athletic Foundation, the National Championship Foundation, and the Houlgate System.

Michigan won the first 12 games of the season by a combined score of 495 to 0, but lost the final game of the season by a score of 2–0 against Chicago.

Minnesota compiled a 10-1 record, shut out 10 of 12 opponents, and outscored all opponents 542 to 22.

== Season overview ==
=== Results and team statistics ===
Conf. Rank	Team	Head coach	Overall record	Conf. record	PPG	PAG
1	Chicago	Amos A. Stagg	11–0	7–0	24.6	0.5
2 (tie)	Michigan	Fielding H. Yost	12–1	2–1	38.1	0.2
2 (tie)	Minnesota	Henry L. Williams	10–1	2–1	49.3	2.0
4	Purdue	Albert Herrnstein	6–1–1	1–1	22.1	3.8
5	Wisconsin	Philip King	8–2	1–2	22.6	2.8
6	Indiana	James M. Sheldon	8–1–1	0–1–1	24.0	3.8
7 (tie)	Iowa	John Chalmers	8–2	0–2	30.9	8.6
7 (tie)	Northwestern	Walter McCornack	8–2–1	0–2	19.5	11.1
7 (tie)	Illinois	Fred Lowenthal	5–4	0–3	9.3	15.1

Key

PPG = Average of points scored per game
PAG = Average of points allowed per game

=== Bowl games ===
No Western Conference schools participated in any bowl games during the 1905 season.

== Awards and honors ==
=== All-Americans ===
The following Western Conference players were selected as first-team players on the 1905 College Football All-America Team. (Consensus All-Americans displayed in bold).

- **Mark Catlin**, end, Chicago (Caspar Whitney [CW])
- **Walter Eckersall**, quarterback, Chicago (Walter Camp [WC], CW, New York Evening Post [NYEP])
- Thomas S. Hammond, Michigan (NYEP)

=== All-Western players ===
Eleven players were chosen as first-team players on at least five of the 1905 All-Western college football teams named by the following 10 selectors: Chicago American (CA), Chicago Chronicle (CC), Chicago Daily News (CDN), Chicago Evening Journal (CEJ), Chicago Evening Post (CP), Chicago Record-Herald (CRH), Chicago Tribune (CT), E. C. Patterson for Collier's Weekly (ECP), J. H. Ritchie in Illustrated Outdoor News (JHR), and The Minneapolis Journal (MJ). (Players unanimously chosen by all 10 selectors are listed in bold.)

Position	Name	Team	Selectors
End	**Mark Catlin**	Chicago	CA, CC, CDN, CEJ, CP, CRH, CT, ECP, JHR, MJ
End	Bobby Marshall	Minnesota	CC, CDN, CP, CT, ECP, JHR, MJ
Tackle	**Wilson Bertke**	Minnesota	CA, CC, CDN, CEJ, CP, CRH, CT, ECP, JHR, MJ
Tackle	Joe Curtis	Michigan	CA, CDN, CEJ, CP, CRH, CT, ECP
Guard	Henry Schulte	Michigan	CA, CC, CDN, CP, CRH, ECP, JHR, MJ
Guard	Walter D. Graham	Michigan	CC, CP, CT, JHR, MJ
C	Germany Schulz	Michigan	CC, CDN, CEJ, CP, CRH, CT, JHR, MJ
Quarterback	**Walter Eckersall**	Chicago	CA, CC, CDN, CEJ, CP, CRH, CT, ECP, JHR, MJ
Halfback	**Thomas S. Hammond**	Michigan	CA, CC, CDN, CEJ, CP, CRH, CT, ECP, JHR, MJ
Halfback	**Albion G. Findlay**	Wisconsin	CA, CC, CDN, CEJ, CP, CRH, CT, ECP, JHR, MJ
Fullback	**Hugo Bezdek**	Chicago	CA, CC, CDN, CEJ, CP, CRH, CT, ECP, JHR, MJ
