= 1905 Chicago Maroons football team =

American college football season

1905 Chicago Maroons football
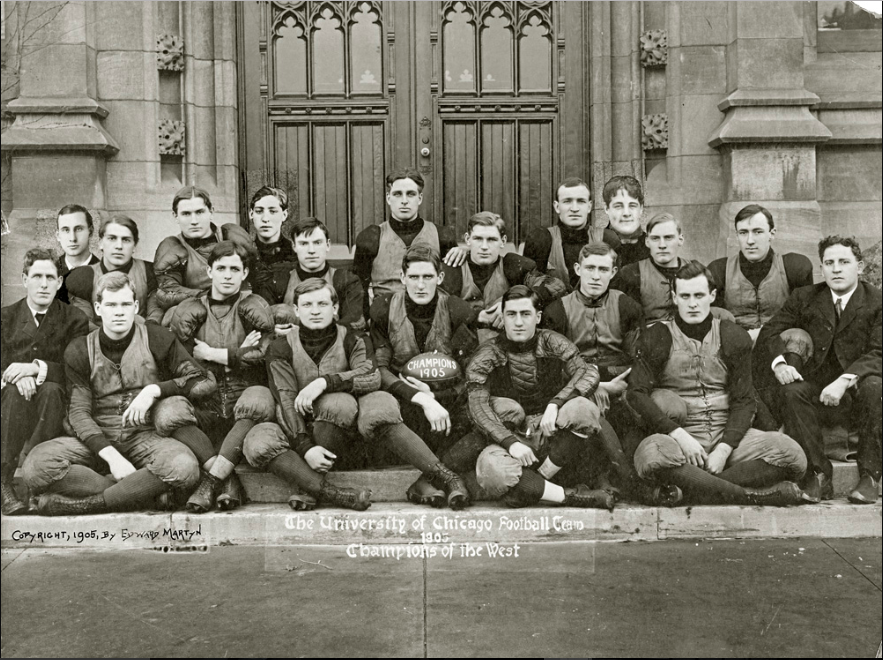

National champion (Billingsley, Helms, Houlgate, NCF) Western Conference champion
- Conference: Western Conference
- Record: 11–0 (7–0 Western)
- Head coach: Amos Alonzo Stagg (14th season)
- Base defense: 7–2–2
- Captain: Mark Catlin Sr.
- Home stadium: Marshall Field

1905 Western Conference football standings
	Conf.					Overall
Team	W		L		T	W		L		T
Chicago $	7	–	0	–	0	11	–	0	–	0
Michigan	2	–	1	–	0	12	–	1	–	0
Minnesota	2	–	1	–	0	10	–	1	–	0
Purdue	1	–	1	–	1	6	–	1	–	1
Wisconsin	1	–	2	–	0	8	–	2	–	0
Indiana	0	–	1	–	1	8	–	1	–	1
Iowa	0	–	2	–	0	8	–	2	–	0
Northwestern	0	–	2	–	0	8	–	2	–	1
Illinois	0	–	3	–	0	5	–	4	–	0
$ – Conference champion

The 1905 Chicago Maroons football team was an American football team that represented the University of Chicago during the 1905 Western Conference football season. In coach Amos Alonzo Stagg's 14th year as head coach, the Maroons finished with an 11–0 record (7–0 against Western Conference opponents), shut out 10 of 11 opponents, and outscored all opponents by a total of 271 to 5. The team played its home games at Marshall Field on the school's campus.

There was no contemporaneous system in 1905 for determining a national champion. However, Chicago was retroactively named as the national champion by the Billingsley Report, the Helms Athletic Foundation, the National Championship Foundation, and the Houlgate System.

End Mark Catlin Sr. was the team captain. Two Chicago players, Catlin and quarterback Walter Eckersall, were consensus first-team selections on the 1905 All-American football team. Other notable players included fullback Hugo Bezdek and center Burton Pike Gale, both of whom were selected by Walter Camp as third-team players on the All-America team.

Three persons associated with the team have been inducted into the College Football Hall of Fame. Stagg and Eckersall were part of the Hall's first class of inductees in 1951. Bezdek was added, based on his coaching accomplishments, in 1954.

== Schedule ==
Date	Time	Opponent	Site	Result	Attendance	Source
September 16		North Division High*	Marshall Field; Chicago, IL	W 26–0		
September 23		Lawrence*	Marshall Field; Chicago, IL	W 33–0		
September 30		Wabash*	Marshall Field; Chicago, IL	W 15–0		
October 4		Beloit*	Marshall Field; Chicago, IL	W 42–0		
October 7		Iowa	Marshall Field; Chicago, IL	W 42–0		
October 14		Indiana	Marshall Field; Chicago, IL	W 16–5		
October 21	2:07 p.m.	at Wisconsin	Randall Field; Madison, WI	W 4–0		
October 28		at Northwestern	Northwestern Field; Evanston, IL	W 32–0		
November 11		Purdue	Marshall Field; Chicago, IL (rivalry)	W 19–0		
November 18		Illinois	Marshall Field; Chicago, IL	W 44–0	10,000	
November 30		Michigan	Marshall Field; Chicago, IL (rivalry)	W 2–0	27,000	
*Non-conference game

== Game summaries ==
=== Chicago 2, Michigan 0 ===
Western Championship Match
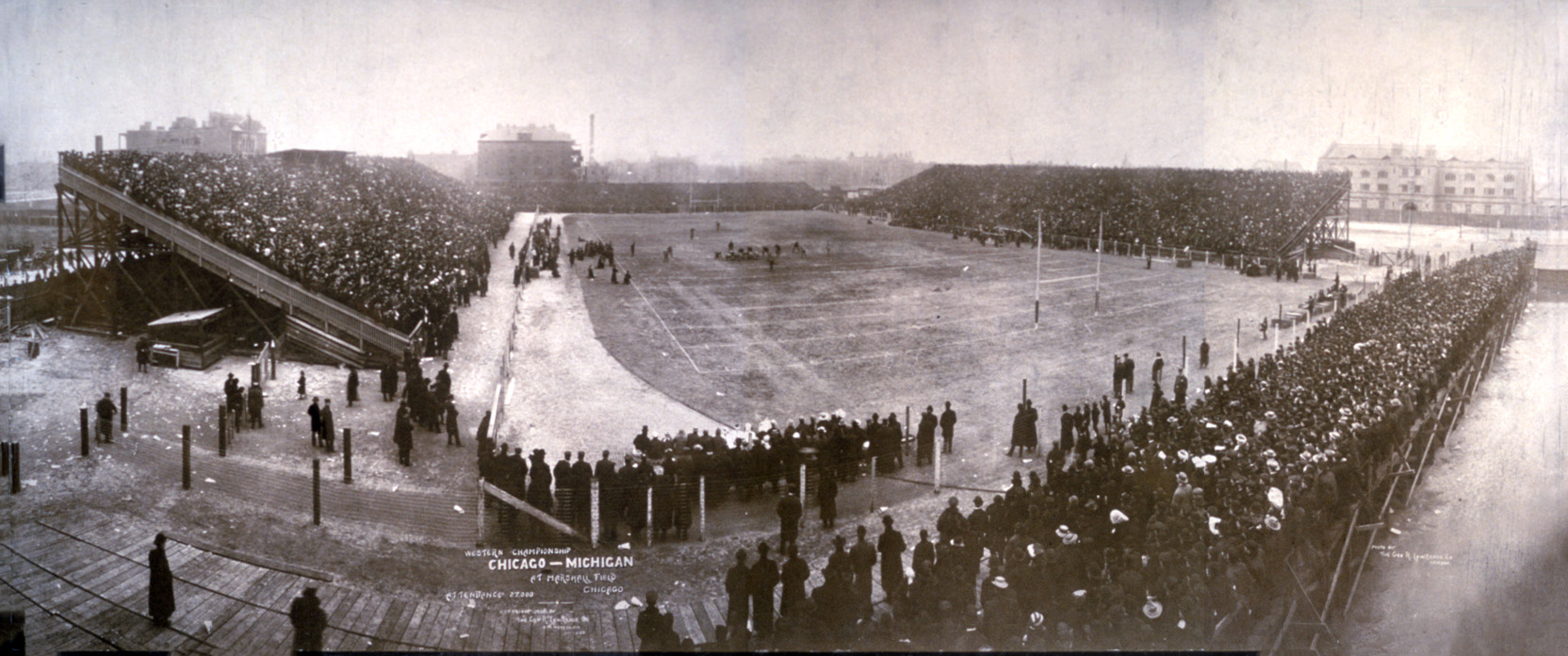

The game, dubbed "The First Greatest Game of the Century," broke Michigan's 56-game unbeaten streak. The 1905 Michigan team had outscored opponents 495-0 in its first 12 games. The game was lost in the final ten minutes of play when Denny Clark was tackled for a safety as he attempted to return a punt from behind the goal line. Newspapers described Clark's play as "the wretched blunder" and a "lapse of brain work." Clark transferred to M.I.T. the following year and was haunted by the play for the rest of his life. In 1932, he shot himself, leaving a suicide note that reportedly expressed hope that his "final play" would atone for his error at Marshall Field in 1905.

The game was played in halves of 35 minutes each.

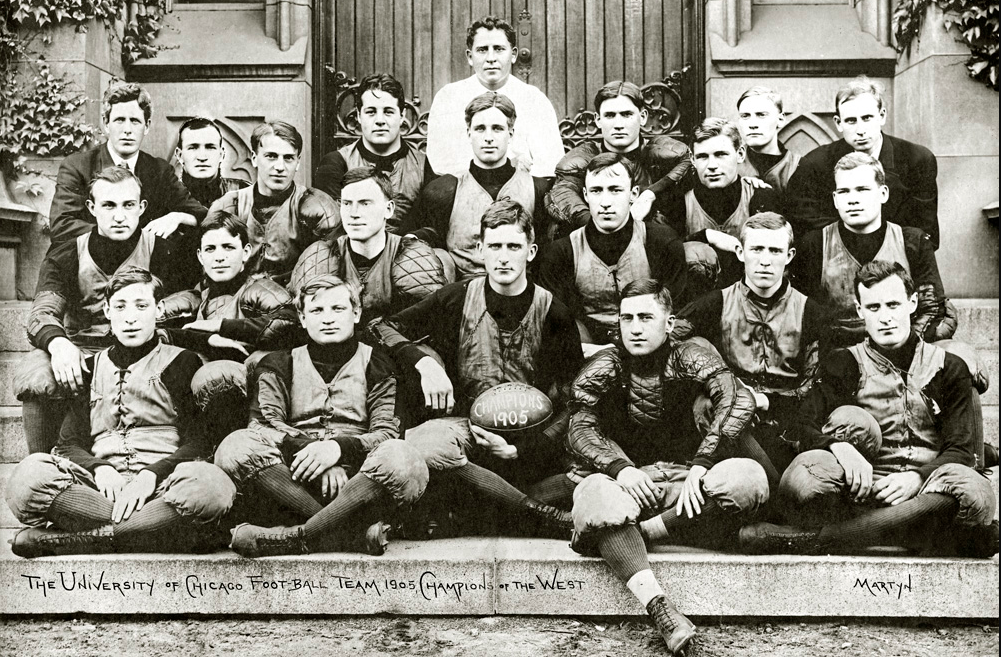
The 1905 Chicago Maroons football team

== Roster ==
Player	Position	Weight
Mark Catlin Sr. (captain)	right end	182
Art Badenoch	right tackle	189
Hugo Bezdek	fullback	179
William James Boone	right halfback	186
Leo DeTray	left halfback	174
Walter Eckersall	quarterback	143
Burton Pike Gale	center	181
Melville Archibald Hill	left tackle	218
Carl Huntley Hitchcock	right halfback	157
Hal Mefford	end	185
Merrill C. Meigs	left guard	196
Ed Parry	left end	202
Clarence W. Russell	right guard	188
Lewis D. Scherer	right guard	184
Mysterious Walker	left halfback	174
Jesse Harper	substitute - quarterback	155
Lester Larson	substitute - end	164
Fred William Noll	substitute - guard	203
Gerry Williamson	substitute - fullback	181
Hiram Conibear	trainer

- Head coach: Amos Alonzo Stagg (14th year at Chicago)
