= 1905 Northwestern Purple football team =

American college football season

1905 Northwestern Purple football
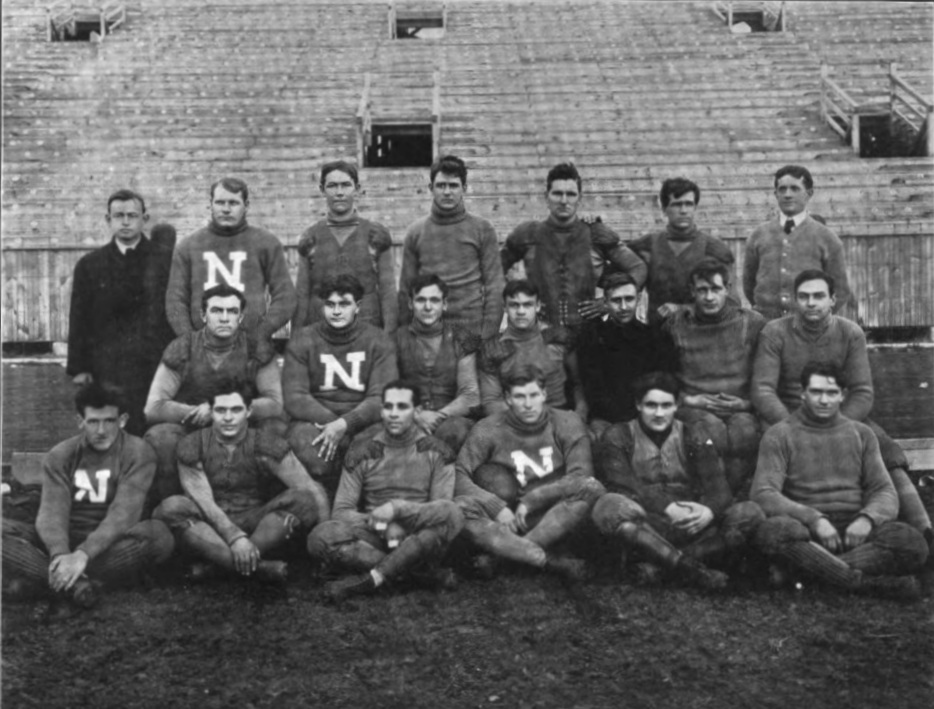
- Conference: Western Conference
- Record: 8–2–1 (0–2 Western)
- Head coach: Walter McCornack (3rd season)
- Captain: Arthur Rueber
- Home stadium: Northwestern Field

1905 Western Conference football standings
	Conf.					Overall
Team	W		L		T	W		L		T
Chicago $	7	–	0	–	0	11	–	0	–	0
Michigan	2	–	1	–	0	12	–	1	–	0
Minnesota	2	–	1	–	0	10	–	1	–	0
Purdue	1	–	1	–	1	6	–	1	–	1
Wisconsin	1	–	2	–	0	8	–	2	–	0
Indiana	0	–	1	–	1	8	–	1	–	1
Iowa	0	–	2	–	0	8	–	2	–	0
Northwestern	0	–	2	–	0	8	–	2	–	1
Illinois	0	–	3	–	0	5	–	4	–	0
$ – Conference champion

The 1905 Northwestern Purple football team represented Northwestern University during the 1905 Western Conference football season. Walter McCornack, in his third season at Northwestern, was the team's head coach. The Purple's home games were played at the new Northwestern Field in Evanston, Illinois. They were members of the Western Conference. They finished the season 8–2–1, and 0–2 in Western Conference play.

== Schedule ==
Date	Opponent	Site	Result	Attendance	Source
September 20	Evanston High School*	Northwestern Field; Evanston, IL	W 32–0		
September 23	at North Division High School*	Marshall Field; Chicago, IL	W 11–0		
September 30	St. Viateur's Academy*	Northwestern Field; Evanston, IL	W 41–0		
October 7	Wabash*	Northwestern Field; Evanston, IL	W 5–0		
October 14	Beloit*	Northwestern Field; Evanston, IL	W 18–2		
October 21	Kentucky University*	Northwestern Field; Evanston, IL	T 0–0		
October 28	Chicago	Northwestern Field; Evanston, IL	L 0–32		
November 4	Marquette*	Northwestern Field; Evanston, IL	W 34–6		
November 11	Ohio Northern*	Northwestern Field; Evanston, IL	W 34–0		
November 18	Michigan Agricultural*	Northwestern Field; Evanston, IL	W 37–11	1,500	
November 25	at Minnesota	Northrop Field; Minneapolis, MN	L 6–72	5,000	
*Non-conference game

== Regular season ==
=== North Division High School ===
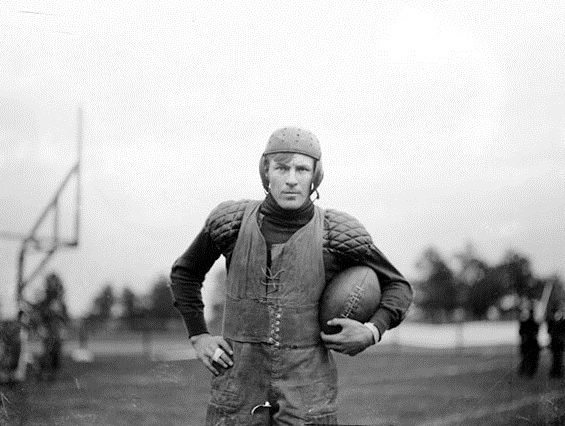
Arthur Rueber before the game

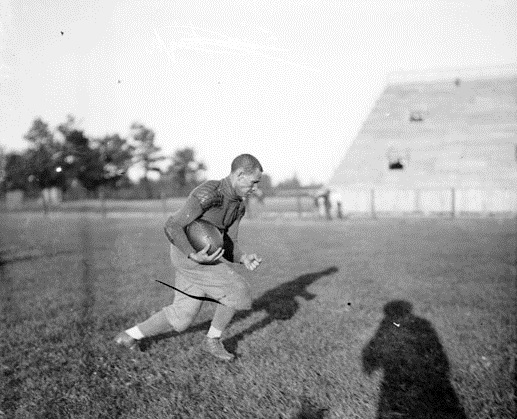
Johnson practicing before the game.

=== Beloit ===
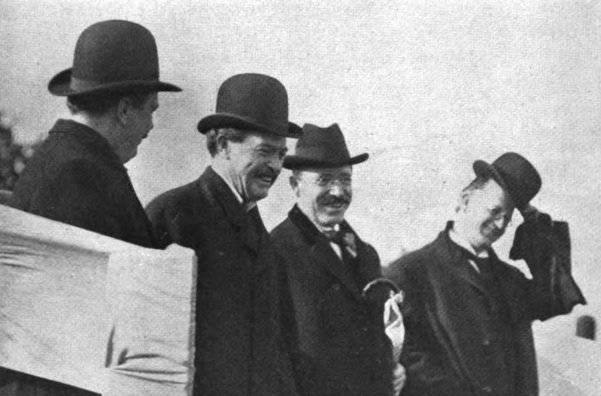
The dedication of Northwestern Field before the Beloit game, with Evanston mayor Barker, Chicago mayor Dunne, dean of the liberal arts college Holgate, and Northwestern business manager Dyche.

=== Kentucky University ===
	1	2	3	4	Total
Kentucky University	0	0	0	0	0
Purple	0	0	0	0	0

=== Chicago ===
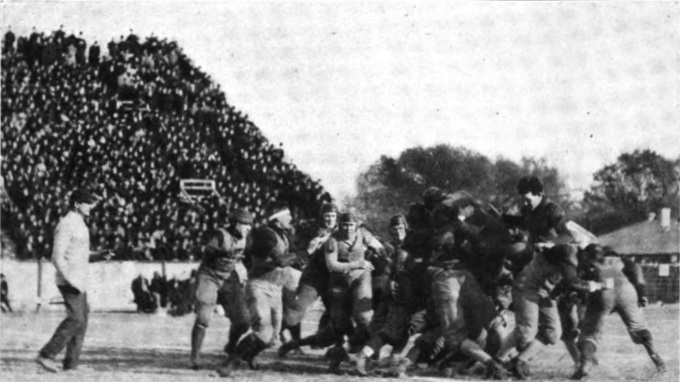
Rueber running with the ball in the Chicago game.

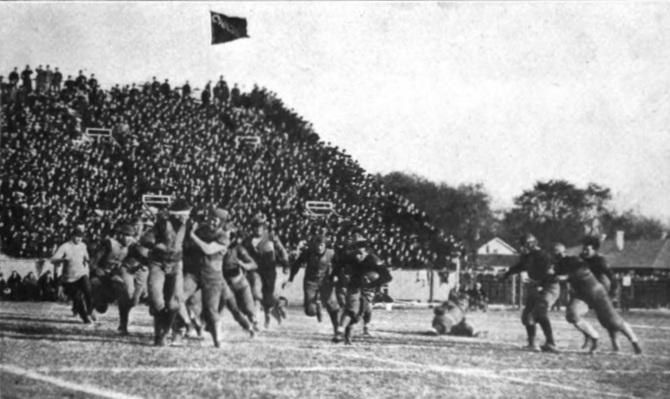
Johnson (center) running with the ball.

=== Minnesota ===
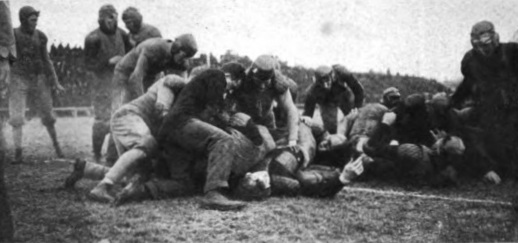
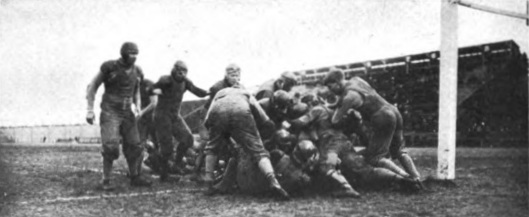

== Roster ==
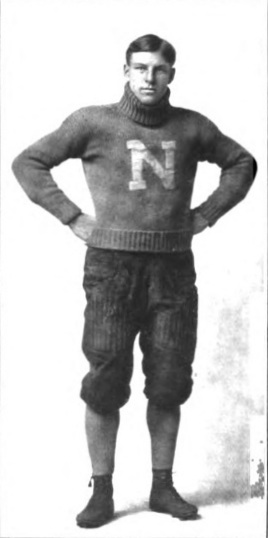
Arthur Rueber, the team captain and right half.

1905 Northwestern Purple roster
Quarterback: James Johnson – Sophomore; Right Half: Arthur Rueber (C) – Junior; Left Half: Oscar Granberg – Freshman; F. Reynolds; Full Back: Charles S. Blair – Senior; Right ends: James Turner – Freshman; William Hanns – Freshman; Right tackle: Bert Jenkins – Freshman	Right guard: Julius G. Carlson – Junior; Center: William Davis – Sophomore; Left guard: Tom Scott – Junior; Left tackles: John P. Gilbreath – Freshman; R. Schoch – Freshman; Left ends: Fred Shauver; Howard McPherrin – Freshman; Ruby J. Hamilton – Freshman	Head coach: Walter McCornack; Assistants: Harry I. Allen – Assistant coach; Frank O. Smith – Manager; Thomas Holland – Trainer; Legend: (C) Team captain
