= Mark Catlin Sr. =

American sportsman, lawyer and politician (1882–1956)

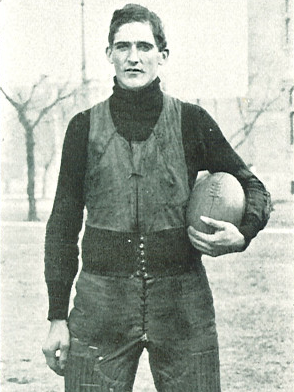
- Catlin in 1907

Biographical details
- Born: November 12, 1882; Aurora, Illinois, U.S.
- Died: May 16, 1956 (aged 73); Appleton, Wisconsin, U.S.

Playing career

Football
- 1903–1905: Chicago
- Positions: End, halfback

Coaching career (HC unless noted)

Football
- 1906–1908: Iowa
- 1909–1918: Lawrence
- 1924–1927: Lawrence

Basketball
- 1909–1912: Lawrence

Head coaching record
- Overall: 63–40–7 (football); 15–13 (basketball)

Accomplishments and honors

Championships
- As coach: MVIAA (1907); MWC (1924); As player: National (1905)

Awards
- Consensus All-American (1905); First-team All-Western (1905)

Mark Seavey Catlin Sr. (November 12, 1882 – May 16, 1956) was an American football player, track athlete, coach, lawyer, and politician. He served as the head football coach at the University of Iowa from 1906 to 1908, and at Lawrence University from 1909 to 1918 and again from 1924 to 1927, compiling a career college football record of 63–40–7. Catlin played football at the University of Chicago and also participated in track and field competitions held adjunct to the 1904 Olympic Games. He later worked as an attorney and also served in the Wisconsin State Assembly from 1921 to 1923.

== Playing career ==
Born in Aurora, Illinois, Catlin played football at the University of Chicago under Amos Alonzo Stagg. He accounted for the only score in Chicago's 1905 victory over Michigan by tackling a Wolverine in the end zone for a safety. The Chicago victory broke Michigan's 56-game unbeaten streak. He earned All-Western Conference honors at the end position, and he was named a second team All-American.

Catlin was also a brilliant field athlete. Catlin won in the broad jump and high and low hurdles and also competed in the hurdles and discus at the Olympic Collegiate Championships, held in St. Louis in June, before the 1904 Olympics, along with many other competitions that included the word "Olympics" in their title. At this competition he received gold medals in the 120 and 220 yd hurdles and silver in the discus. His time in the 120 yd hurdles (15 3-5s) bested that recorded in the official Olympics (16s). He graduated from Chicago in 1905. 100 years later, Catlin was elected to the University of Chicago's Hall of Fame in 2005.

== Coaching career ==
=== Iowa ===
Mark Catlin decided to go to law school at the University of Iowa. Catlin was hired as the heir apparent to John Chalmers as Iowa's head football coach. Catlin spent the 1906 season assisting Chalmers. Although Catlin was actually an assistant coach, many Iowa records consider Catlin, not Chalmers, the official coach of the 1906 Hawkeyes.

The Western Conference meetings of 1905 led to two significant rule changes. Conference members were not allowed to play more than five games per season. Also, freshmen were now ineligible, and players were allowed a maximum of three years of eligibility. These rule changes were made in response to growing criticism over player injuries and deaths during games at that time.

These changes greatly hampered play in 1906. Conference players who were to be seniors were all ruled ineligible, because they had already played three years of competition. Players who were to be freshmen also sat out. Only players who were to be sophomores and juniors were allowed to play.

Iowa finished with a 2–3 record in 1906. Coaches Chalmers and Catlin worked well together but had contrasting coaching styles. Chalmers learned the eastern style of play at Lafayette, coaching players as individuals and devising conservative schemes to maximize their talents. Catlin learned the western style of play from Amos Alonzo Stagg at Chicago, coaching schemes rather than players and advocating an open, aggressive style.

The most notable game of the 1907 season was the "rabbit game" against Wisconsin. After two easy wins to start the season, Iowa held a 5–0 halftime lead over Wisconsin when the two teams lined up for the second half kickoff. A rabbit ran out of Wisconsin's end zone and sprinted 110 yards downfield into Iowa's end zone. Wisconsin returned a punt late in the game for a touchdown, following the path of the rabbit, and gave the Badgers a 6–5 win.

The Hawkeyes were amusingly convinced that it was the rabbit that had jinxed the team. Before their Wednesday practice for the weekend's Illinois game, the team had a rabbit hunt. Catlin found and shot the unlucky rabbit, and before the game with Illinois, the members of the Hawkeye team rubbed the dead rabbit's left hind foot for good luck. It must have worked; Iowa won, 25–12. Iowa finished the year with a 3–2 record.

Catlin returned for the 1908 season. The season opening game against Coe College set the tone for the season. Two years earlier, Coe protested a game against Iowa. Iowa had won, 15–12, but there was considerable controversy surrounding the win. Iowa trailed late in the game, and Coe officials complained that the timekeeper had given the Hawkeye team extra time to get in position for the game winning score. The Hawkeyes were determined to leave no doubt this time. They didn't. Iowa won, 92–0. It is still the second largest margin of victory in school history. However, it was a Pyrrhic victory. Five prominent players, including Carroll "Chick" Kirk and Walter "Stub" Stewart, were badly injured and did not regain their effectiveness all year. As a result, Iowa stumbled to a 2–5 record.

In 1908, Catlin acquired a live black bear named Burch when visiting his dad back in Wisconsin. Burch served as the mascot for the Iowa Football team from 1908 to 1910.

Mark Catlin, law degree in hand, left Iowa after the 1908 season. He had a 5–7 record in 1907–1908, and a 2–3 record in 1906. Despite the record, Catlin was a very innovative coach. He introduced the team to the game of handball to develop the team's quickness. He was also one of the first coaches to give his players oxygen when they became winded. In addition to coaching football, Catlin served as Iowa's track and cross country coach for three years from 1906 to 1908. He left to coach at Lawrence University.

=== Lawrence ===
Catlin began to make his mark on Lawrence football in 1910, when the Vikings played to a 6–6 tie with Wisconsin. For the next four seasons, Lawrence was the unquestioned powerhouse of small college football in the state. Catlin's teams won four consecutive Wisconsin Intercollegiate championships from 1911 to 1914 and gave up just one touchdown to a small college opponent. In that stretch, Lawrence outscored its opponents 485–143.

Catlin stepped away from football following the 1918 season. He served in the Wisconsin State Assembly from 1921 to 1923 as a Republican. His son, Mark Catlin Jr., also served in the Wisconsin State Assembly and was the speaker. After being defeated in the Republican primary in 1922, he returned to his law practice.

Catlin returned to football in 1924 and coached the Vikings to a 4–1–1 record and their second Midwest Conference championship. He coached for three more seasons before leaving Lawrence for good in 1927.

Catlin was a master strategist and psychologist when it came to gridiron tactics. He insisted on skin-tight dark blue jerseys, to make his team look smaller. This was the rough-and-tumble age of football, and Catlin wanted his men to be the toughest. He allowed minimal padding, and the men wore no shoulder pads or helmets. Catlin once said, "My theory on shoulder pads is that they are unnecessary because nature has provided protection at the vital points."

Catlin earned the moniker "Coach of Champions" during his 14 years as the football coach at Lawrence University. He won five conference championships, and his record of 55–29–7 ranks him third on the school's all-time wins list.

Catlin worked as an attorney until his death of a heart attack in 1956. He was inducted into the Lawrence University Hall of Fame in 2002.

== Head coaching record ==
=== Football ===
| Year | Team | Overall | Conference | Standing |
|---|---|---|---|---|
Iowa Hawkeyes (Western Conference) (1906–1908)
| 1906 | Iowa | 2–3 | 0–1 | 6th |
Iowa Hawkeyes (Western Conference / Missouri Valley Intercollegiate Athletic Association) (1907–1908)
| 1907 | Iowa | 3–2 | 1–1 / 1–0 | 4th / T–1st |
| 1908 | Iowa | 2–5 | 0–1 / 0–4–0 | 6th / 7th |
| Iowa: | | 7–10 | 1–3 / 1–4 | |
Lawrence Vikings (Independent) (1909–1918)
| 1909 | Lawrence | 4–3 | | |
| 1910 | Lawrence | 3–3–1 | | |
| 1911 | Lawrence | 8–1 | | |
| 1912 | Lawrence | 5–1–1 | | |
| 1913 | Lawrence | 5–1–1 | | |
| 1914 | Lawrence | 5–1 | | |
| 1915 | Lawrence | 2–5 | | |
| 1916 | Lawrence | 4–2–1 | | |
| 1917 | No team—World War I | | | |
| 1918 | Lawrence | 6–1 | | |
Lawrence Vikings (Midwest Conference) (1924–1927)
| 1924 | Lawrence | 4–2–1 | 1–0–1 | T–1st |
| 1925 | Lawrence | 4–3 | 2–1 | 5th |
| 1926 | Lawrence | 4–2–2 | 1–1–1 | T–4th |
| 1927 | Lawrence | 2–5 | 1–2 | 7th |
| Lawrence: | | 56–30–7 | 5–4–2 | |
| Total: | | 63–40–7 | | |
National championship Conference title Conference division title or championship game berth
