= Lewis D. Scherer =

American football player and coach (1879–1963)

Biographical details
- Born: June 11, 1879; Asbury Township, Gallatin County, Illinois, U.S.
- Died: July 16, 1963 (aged 84); Chehalis, Washington, U.S.
- Education: University of Chicago (1904)

Playing career
- 1905: Chicago
- Position: Right guard

Coaching career (HC unless noted)
- 1906–1908: Nebraska State Normal
- 1910–1912: Baker

Head coaching record
- Overall: 15–23–4

Lewis Daniel Scherer (June 11, 1879 – July 16, 1963) was an American college football player and coach. He served as the head football coach at Nebraska State Normal School, known as Peru State College, from 1907 to 1908 and at Baker University from 1910 to 1912. Scherer was an alumnus of the University of Chicago. He started at right guard on the 1905 Chicago Maroons football team, which was later recognized as a national champion.

== Early life ==
Scherer was born in Butler, Illinois on June 11, 1879. His was raised in Chehalis, Washington after his family moved to the city in 1891. He attended the University of Washington and was the team's starting center on defense, receiving all-star notoriety and declared the "best center-rush ever turned out at the Seattle varsity" and "never fails to 'get the charge' on his opponent".

== Coaching career ==
Prior to becoming a head football coach, Scherer served as physical director for Nebraska State Normal School in Peru, Nebraska, resigning in January 1910 under the title of professor to work as an assistant for a doctor at Harvard. Scherer was the head football coach at the Baker University in Baldwin City, Kansas for three seasons, from 1910 to 1912, compiling a record of 8–13–2. After a winless 1910 season, Scherer began 1911 with better hope, though noting a lack of returning men from his main rotation. He focused on the kicking game, described as being helmed by one of the best kickers in the state. While coaching, Scherer received a degree from Baker in 1912.

== Personal life and death ==
Scherer was recognized in 1913 as a "C" man, an honorific given to certain University of Chicago ballplayers of note during the mid-to-late 1900s, during the dedication of a new grandstand at Stagg Field, then known as Marshall Field. After his college coaching career, Scherer returned to Chehalis where he began to raise Holstein cows in 1921, quickly becoming a successful breeder. He was hired as a teacher at the Chehalis High School in 1922 and became principal of the city's Dillenbaugh school the following year. In 1926, along with other members, he began and led a cooperative chicken hatchery in Chehalis. Similar to his breeding business, the hatchery became successful and he began an interest in crop farming.

Scherer and his wife, Helen, who was a school teacher and educator in Chehalis, had two daughters, Doris and Phyllis. Helen died at the age of 55 on May 24, 1934. Lewis married Minnie Rutledge in August 1935. Scherer filed a request for divorce two months later in mid-October, claiming his new bride "developed a dislike for him" and he was being treated cruelly. He was reported as having a wife by September 1936.

Scherer died on July 16, 1963, at his home in Chehalis, Washington, survived by a widow, Bozena, and his daughter Doris.

== Head coaching record ==
Year	Team	Overall	Conference	Standing	Bowl/playoffs
Nebraska State Normal (Independent) (1906–1908)
1906	Nebraska State Normal	3–5–1			
1907	Nebraska State Normal	3–1–1			
1908	Nebraska State Normal	1–4			
Nebraska State Normal:		7–10–2			
Baker Methodists (Kansas College Athletic Conference) (1910–1912)
1910	Baker	0–6–1			
1911	Baker	5–2–1			
1912	Baker	3–5			
Baker:		8–13–2			
Total:		15–23–4			
