= 1905 Wisconsin Badgers football team =

American college football season

1905 Wisconsin Badgers football
- Conference: Western Conference
- Record: 8–2 (1–2 Western)
- Head coach: Philip King (8th season)
- Captain: E. J. Vanderboom
- Home stadium: Randall Field

1905 Western Conference football standings
	Conf.					Overall
Team	W		L		T	W		L		T
Chicago $	7	–	0	–	0	11	–	0	–	0
Michigan	2	–	1	–	0	12	–	1	–	0
Minnesota	2	–	1	–	0	10	–	1	–	0
Purdue	1	–	1	–	1	6	–	1	–	1
Wisconsin	1	–	2	–	0	8	–	2	–	0
Indiana	0	–	1	–	1	8	–	1	–	1
Iowa	0	–	2	–	0	8	–	2	–	0
Northwestern	0	–	2	–	0	8	–	2	–	1
Illinois	0	–	3	–	0	5	–	4	–	0
$ – Conference champion

The 1905 Wisconsin Badgers football team represented the University of Wisconsin in the 1905 Western Conference football season. Philip King, who helmed the team from 1896 to 1902, returned for his eighth and final season as head coach. The Badgers compiled an overall record of 8–2 with a mark of 1–2 in conference play, placing fifth in the Western Conference. The team's captain was E. J. Vanderboom.

== Schedule ==
Date	Time	Opponent	Site	Result	Attendance	Source
September 23		at Marinette Company I*	Marinette, WI	W 16–0		
September 30		North-Western College*	Randall Field; Madison, WI	W 49–0		
October 4		Marquette*	Randall Field; Madison, WI	W 29–0		
October 7		Lawrence*	Randall Field; Madison, WI	W 34–0		
October 14		vs. Notre Dame*	Milwaukee, WI	W 21–0		
October 21	2:07 p.m.	Chicago	Randall Field; Madison, WI	L 0–4		
October 28		vs. Wisconsin alumni*	Madison, WI	W 17–0		
November 4		at Minnesota	Northrop Field; Minneapolis, MN (rivalry)	W 16–12	25,000	
November 11		Beloit*	Randall Field; Madison, WI	W 44–0		
November 18		at Michigan	Regents Field; Ann Arbor, MI	L 0–12	17,000	
*Non-conference game
