= 1905 Indiana Hoosiers football team =

American college football season

1905 Indiana Hoosiers football
- Conference: Western Conference
- Record: 8–1–1 (0–1–1 Western)
- Head coach: James M. Sheldon (1st season)
- Captain: Frank Hare
- Home stadium: Jordan Field

1905 Western Conference football standings
	Conf.					Overall
Team	W		L		T	W		L		T
Chicago $	7	–	0	–	0	11	–	0	–	0
Michigan	2	–	1	–	0	12	–	1	–	0
Minnesota	2	–	1	–	0	10	–	1	–	0
Purdue	1	–	1	–	1	6	–	1	–	1
Wisconsin	1	–	2	–	0	8	–	2	–	0
Indiana	0	–	1	–	1	8	–	1	–	1
Iowa	0	–	2	–	0	8	–	2	–	0
Northwestern	0	–	2	–	0	8	–	2	–	1
Illinois	0	–	3	–	0	5	–	4	–	0
$ – Conference champion

The 1905 Indiana Hoosiers football team was an American football team that represented Indiana University Bloomington during the 1905 Western Conference football season. In their first season under head coach James M. Sheldon, the Hoosiers compiled an 8–1–1 record and outscored their opponents by a combined total of 240 to 38.

== Schedule ==
Date	Opponent	Site	Result	Attendance	Source
September 23	Indiana alumni*	Jordan Field; Bloomington, IN	W 5–0		
September 30	Butler*	Jordan Field; Bloomington, IN	W 31–0		
October 7	Kentucky State College*	Jordan Field; Bloomington, IN (rivalry)	W 29–0		
October 14	at Chicago	Marshall Field; Chicago, IL	L 5–16		
October 21	Washington University*	Jordan Field; Bloomington, IN	W 39–0		
October 28	vs. Purdue	Washington Park; Indianapolis, IN (rivalry)	T 11–11		
November 4	Cincinnati*	Jordan Field; Bloomington, IN	W 47–6	1,000	
November 11	Notre Dame*	Jordan Field; Bloomington, IN	W 22–5		
November 18	Wabash*	Jordan Field; Bloomington, IN	W 40–0		
November 30	at Ohio State	Ohio Field; Columbus, OH	W 11–0		
*Non-conference game
