= 1905 Purdue Boilermakers football team =

American college football season

1905 Purdue Boilermakers football
- Conference: Western Conference
- Record: 6–1–1 (1–2 Western)
- Head coach: Albert E. Herrnstein (1st season)
- Captain: Homer L. Thomas
- Home stadium: Stuart Field

1905 Western Conference football standings
	Conf.					Overall
Team	W		L		T	W		L		T
Chicago $	7	–	0	–	0	11	–	0	–	0
Michigan	2	–	1	–	0	12	–	1	–	0
Minnesota	2	–	1	–	0	10	–	1	–	0
Purdue	1	–	1	–	1	6	–	1	–	1
Wisconsin	1	–	2	–	0	8	–	2	–	0
Indiana	0	–	1	–	1	8	–	1	–	1
Iowa	0	–	2	–	0	8	–	2	–	0
Northwestern	0	–	2	–	0	8	–	2	–	1
Illinois	0	–	3	–	0	5	–	4	–	0
$ – Conference champion

The 1905 Purdue Boilermakers football team was an American football team that represented Purdue University during the 1905 Western Conference football season. In their first season under head coach Albert E. Herrnstein, the Boilermakers compiled a 6–1–1 record, finished in fourth place in the Big Nine Conference with a 1–1–1 record against conference opponents, and outscored all opponents by a total of 177 to 30. Homer L. Thomas was the team captain.

== Schedule ==
Date	Opponent	Site	Result	Attendance	Source
September 23	Wendell Phillips H.S.*	Stuart Field; West Lafayette, IN	W 33–0		
September 30	Beloit*	Stuart Field; West Lafayette, IN	W 36–0		
October 14	Wabash*	Stuart Field; West Lafayette, IN	W 12–0		
October 21	at Illinois	Illinois Field; Champaign, IL (rivalry)	W 29–0		
October 28	vs. Indiana	Washington Park; Indianapolis, IN (rivalry)	T 11–11		
November 4	Missouri*	Stuart Field; West Lafayette, IN	W 24–0	2,500	
November 11	at Chicago	Marshall Field; Chicago, IL (rivalry)	L 0–19	10,000	
November 24	Notre Dame*	Stuart Field; West Lafayette, IN (rivalry)	W 32–0		
*Non-conference game

== Roster ==
- D. M. Allen, T
- J. L. Conville
- Harold Emies, T
- R. W. Fleming, E
- H. J. Frushour, G
- R. F. Haffmark, G
- E. R. Holdson, QB
- Asher Holloway, HB
- Thomas Johnston, QB
- E. P. King, G
- D. H. Long, T
- Irving Long, T-G
- Robert Robertson, T
- Roy Shackleton, QB
- Homer Thomas, FB
- W. Wellinghoff, C
- C. Zimmerman, HB
