= 1905 Iowa Hawkeyes football team =

American college football season

1905 Iowa Hawkeyes football
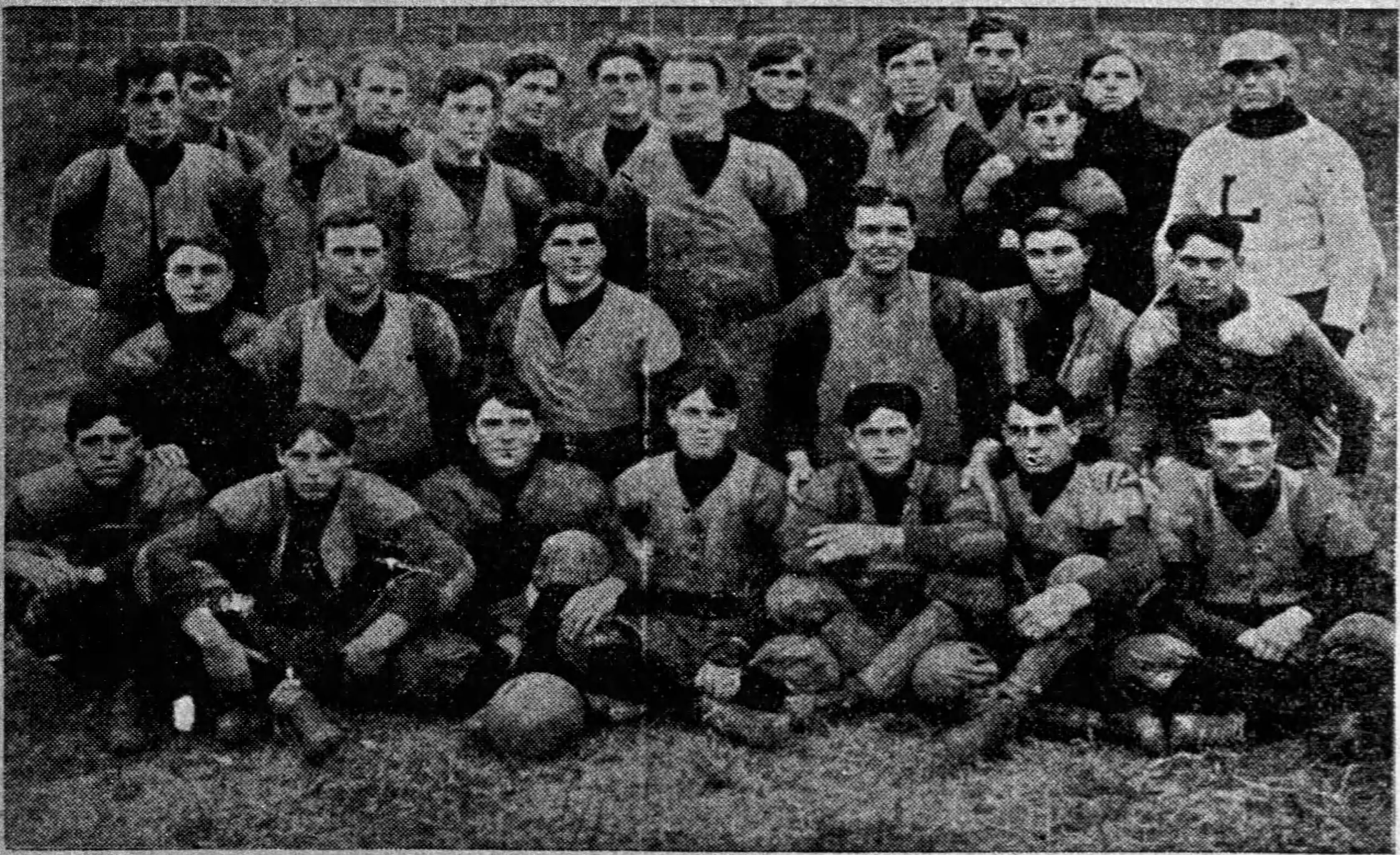

Iowa state champion
- Conference: Western Conference
- Record: 8–2 (0–2 Western)
- Head coach: John Chalmers (3rd season)
- Captain: A. Earle McGowan
- Home stadium: Iowa Field

1905 Western Conference football standings
	Conf.					Overall
Team	W		L		T	W		L		T
Chicago $	7	–	0	–	0	11	–	0	–	0
Michigan	2	–	1	–	0	12	–	1	–	0
Minnesota	2	–	1	–	0	10	–	1	–	0
Purdue	1	–	1	–	1	6	–	1	–	1
Wisconsin	1	–	2	–	0	8	–	2	–	0
Indiana	0	–	1	–	1	8	–	1	–	1
Iowa	0	–	2	–	0	8	–	2	–	0
Northwestern	0	–	2	–	0	8	–	2	–	1
Illinois	0	–	3	–	0	5	–	4	–	0
$ – Conference champion

The 1905 Iowa Hawkeyes football team was an American football team that represented the State University of Iowa ("S.U.I."), now commonly known as the University of Iowa, as a member of the Western Conference during the 1905 Western Conference football season. In their third and final year under head coach John Chalmers, the Hawkeyes compiled an 8–2 record (0–2 in conference games), tied for last place in the Western Conference, shut out seven of ten opponents, and outscored all opponents by a total of 309 to 86.

With victories over six Iowa schools (Coe, Iowa State Normal, Grinnell, Des Moines, Drake, and Iowa State), the Hawkeyes were recognized as the undisputed Iowa football champion. Their 72–0 victory over Des Moines remains the sixth-largest margin of victory in Iowa football history.

Fullback A. Earle McGowan was the team captain. Quarterback Maury Kent later played professional baseball and served as the head football coach at Iowa State.

The team played its home games at Iowa Field in Iowa City, Iowa.

== Schedule ==
Date	Time	Opponent	Site	Result	Attendance	Source
September 26		Coe*	Iowa Field; Iowa City, IA	W 27–0		
September 30		Monmouth (IL)*	Iowa Field; Iowa City, IA	W 40–0		
October 7		at Chicago	Marshall Field; Chicago, IL	L 0–42		
October 21		at Minnesota	Northrop Field; Minneapolis, MN (rivalry)	L 0–39	3,550	
October 28		Iowa State Normal*	Iowa Field; Iowa City, IA	W 41–5		
November 4		Grinnell*	Iowa Field; Iowa City, IA	W 45–0		
November 11		Des Moines*	Iowa Field; Iowa City, IA	W 72–0		
November 18		Drake*	Iowa Field; Iowa City, IA	W 44–0		
November 24		at Iowa State*	State Field; Ames, IA (rivalry)	W 8–0	3,000	
November 30	2:30 p.m.	at Saint Louis*	Sportsman's Park; St. Louis, MO	W 31–0		
*Non-conference game

== Players ==
- George Allen, halback
- George A. Bemis, quarterback, Spencer, Iowa
- Andrew Chalmers, halfback
- Thomas Green, fullback
- Maury Kent, quarterback
- A. Earle McGowan (sometimes spelled McGowen or MacGowan), fullback and captain, Ida Grove, Iowa
- Fred Moore, center
- Bernard V. Murphy
- Carl Narum, guard
- Merle Rockwood, guard
- Frederick Schwinn, tackle
- Earl Seidel, tackle
- Jeff Streff, end
- William Tupper, halfback
- Roy Washburn, end/guard/fullback
- Roy White, end/tackle
