= William Boone (American football) =

American football player and coach (1879–1963)

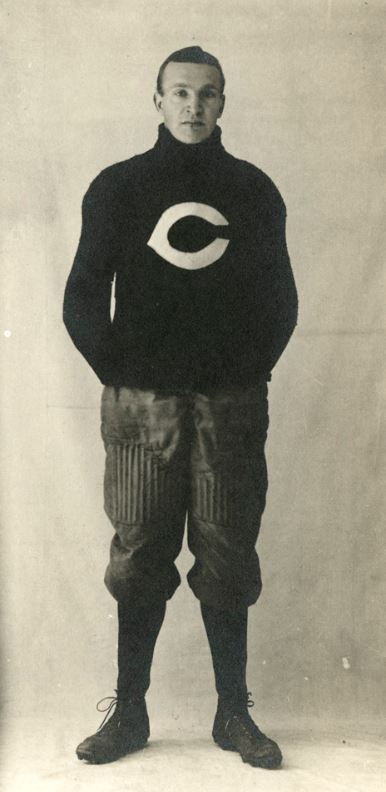

Biographical details
- Born: July 7, 1879; Woodbridge Township, Michigan, U.S.
- Died: May 15, 1963 (aged 83); Chicago, Illinois, U.S.
- Education: Hillsdale College (1904); University of Chicago

Playing career
- 1904–1905: Chicago
- Position: Halfback

Coaching career (HC unless noted)
- 1906: Hillsdale

Head coaching record
- Overall: 0–7

Accomplishments and honors

Championships
- National (1905)

William James Boone (July 7, 1879 – May 15, 1963) was an American football coach. He served as the head football coach at Hillsdale College in Hillsdale, Michigan for one season in 1906, tallying a mark of 0–7 .

Boone played football under Amos Alonzo Stagg at the University of Chicago. He was the starting right halfback of the 1905 University of Chicago national championship team .
