= 1905 Illinois Fighting Illini football team =

American college football season

1905 Illinois Fighting Illini football
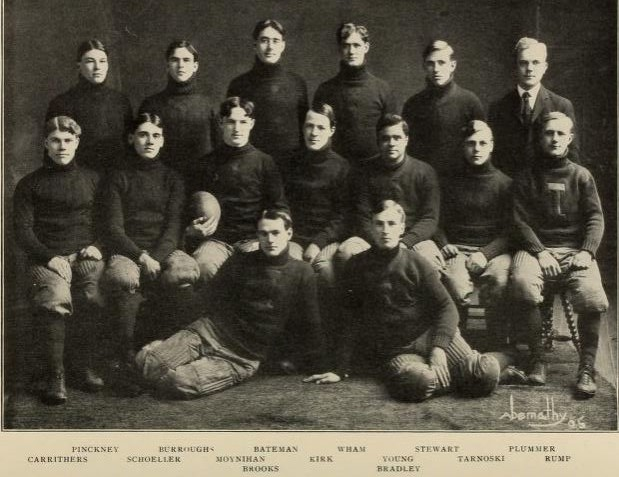
- Conference: Western Conference
- Record: 5–4 (0–3 Western)
- Head coach: Fred Lowenthal (2nd season)
- Captain: C. J. Moynihan
- Home stadium: Illinois Field

1905 Western Conference football standings
	Conf.					Overall
Team	W		L		T	W		L		T
Chicago $	7	–	0	–	0	11	–	0	–	0
Michigan	2	–	1	–	0	12	–	1	–	0
Minnesota	2	–	1	–	0	10	–	1	–	0
Purdue	1	–	1	–	1	6	–	1	–	1
Wisconsin	1	–	2	–	0	8	–	2	–	0
Indiana	0	–	1	–	1	8	–	1	–	1
Iowa	0	–	2	–	0	8	–	2	–	0
Northwestern	0	–	2	–	0	8	–	2	–	1
Illinois	0	–	3	–	0	5	–	4	–	0
$ – Conference champion

The 1905 Illinois Fighting Illini football team was an American football team that represented the University of Illinois during the 1905 Western Conference football season. In their second season under head coach Fred Lowenthal, the Illini compiled a 5–4 record and finished in last place in the Western Conference. Tackle/halfback C. J. Moynihan was the team captain.

== Schedule ==
Date	Opponent	Site	Result	Attendance	Source
September 30	Knox*	Illinois Field; Champaign, IL	W 30–0		
October 4	Wabash*	Illinois Field; Champaign, IL	W 6–0		
October 7	Northwestern College*	Illinois Field; Champaign, IL	W 24–0		
October 14	Saint Louis*	Illinois Field; Champaign, IL	W 12–6		
October 21	Purdue	Illinois Field; Champaign, IL (rivalry)	L 0–29		
October 28	Chicago Physicians and Surgeons*	Illinois Field; Champaign, IL	W 30–0		
November 4	Michigan	Illinois Field; Champaign, IL (rivalry)	L 0–33	6,000	
November 18	at Chicago	Marshall Field; Chicago, IL	L 0–44	10,000	
November 30	at Nebraska*	Antelope Field; Lincoln, NE	L 6–24		
*Non-conference game
