= 1905 Minnesota Golden Gophers football team =

American college football season

1905 Minnesota Golden Gophers football
- Conference: Western Conference
- Record: 10–1 (2–1 Western)
- Head coach: Henry L. Williams (6th season)
- Captain: Earl Current
- Home stadium: Northrop Field

1905 Western Conference football standings
	Conf.					Overall
Team	W		L		T	W		L		T
Chicago $	7	–	0	–	0	11	–	0	–	0
Michigan	2	–	1	–	0	12	–	1	–	0
Minnesota	2	–	1	–	0	10	–	1	–	0
Purdue	1	–	1	–	1	6	–	1	–	1
Wisconsin	1	–	2	–	0	8	–	2	–	0
Indiana	0	–	1	–	1	8	–	1	–	1
Iowa	0	–	2	–	0	8	–	2	–	0
Northwestern	0	–	2	–	0	8	–	2	–	1
Illinois	0	–	3	–	0	5	–	4	–	0
$ – Conference champion

The 1905 Minnesota Golden Gophers football team represented the University of Minnesota in the 1905 Western Conference football season. In their sixth year under head coach Henry L. Williams, the Golden Gophers compiled a 10–1 record (2–1 against Western Conference opponents), shut out 9 of 11 opponents, and outscored all opponents 542 to 22.

== Schedule ==
Date	Opponent	Site	Result	Attendance	Source
September 23	Twin Cities Central High*	Northrop Field; Minneapolis, MN	W 74–0	3,500	
September 30	Shattuck/Pillsbury Academy*	Northrop Field; Minneapolis, MN	W 54–0	1,500	
September 30	St. Thomas (MN)*	Northrop Field; Minneapolis, MN	W 42–0	1,500	
October 7	North Dakota Agricultural*	Northrop Field; Minneapolis, MN	W 45–0	2,000	
October 14	Iowa State*	Northrop Field; Minneapolis, MN	W 42–0	1,000	
October 21	Iowa	Northrop Field; Minneapolis, MN (rivalry)	W 39–0	3,550	
October 28	Lawrence*	Northrop Field; Minneapolis, MN	W 46–0	1,000	
November 4	Wisconsin	Northrop Field; Minneapolis, MN (rivalry)	L 12–16	25,000	
November 11	South Dakota State*	Northrop Field; Minneapolis, MN	W 81–0	1,000	
November 18	Nebraska*	Northrop Field; Minneapolis, MN (rivalry)	W 35–0	10,000	
November 25	Northwestern	Northrop Field; Minneapolis, MN	W 72–6	5,000	
*Non-conference game
