= Theodore M. Stuart =

American football player and coach (1883–1946)

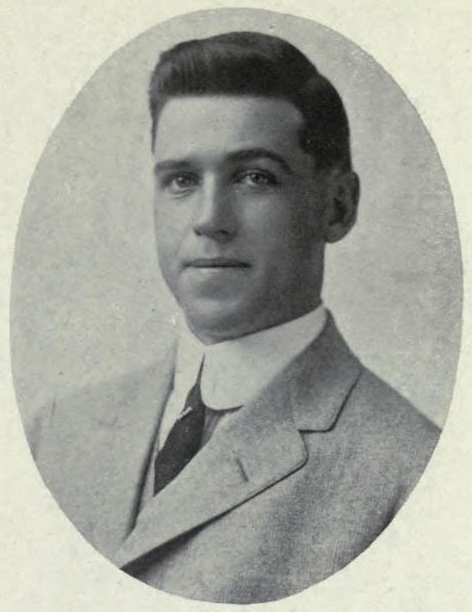

Biographical details
- Born: June 24, 1883; Chariton, Iowa, U.S.
- Died: January 14, 1946 (aged 62); San Mateo, California, U.S.

Playing career
- 1904–1905: Michigan
- Positions: End, halfback

Coaching career (HC unless noted)
- 1909: Baker
- 1910–1911: Colorado Mines

Head coaching record
- Overall: 7–10

Theodore Mallory Stuart Jr. (June 24, 1883 – January 14, 1946) was an American college football player and coach. He played as an end and halfback for the University of Michigan's 1904 and 1905 "Point-a-Minute" football teams and served as the head football coach at Colorado School of Mines from 1910 to 1911. He also practiced law in Iowa, Colorado, and California from 1906 to 1946 and served as the assistant attorney general of the State of Colorado from 1911 to 1912.

== Early years ==
Stuart was born in Chariton, Iowa in 1883. His father, Theodore M. Stuart Sr., was an Ohio native who established a law practice at Chariton. His mother, Sara (Walker) Stuart was also an Ohio native. Stuart had five siblings: Katie, C.W. Stuart, Col. George W. Stuart, Mrs. Louis Israel, and E. G. Stuart. Stuart attended primary school in the public schools at Chariton. He moved to Denver, Colorado, where his uncle, Thomas B. Stuart, was a judge. Stuart attended high school in Denver, Colorado, and subsequently attended the University of Denver, "pursuing a scientific course." He received a Bachelor of Arts degree from the University of Denver in 1904.

== University of Michigan ==
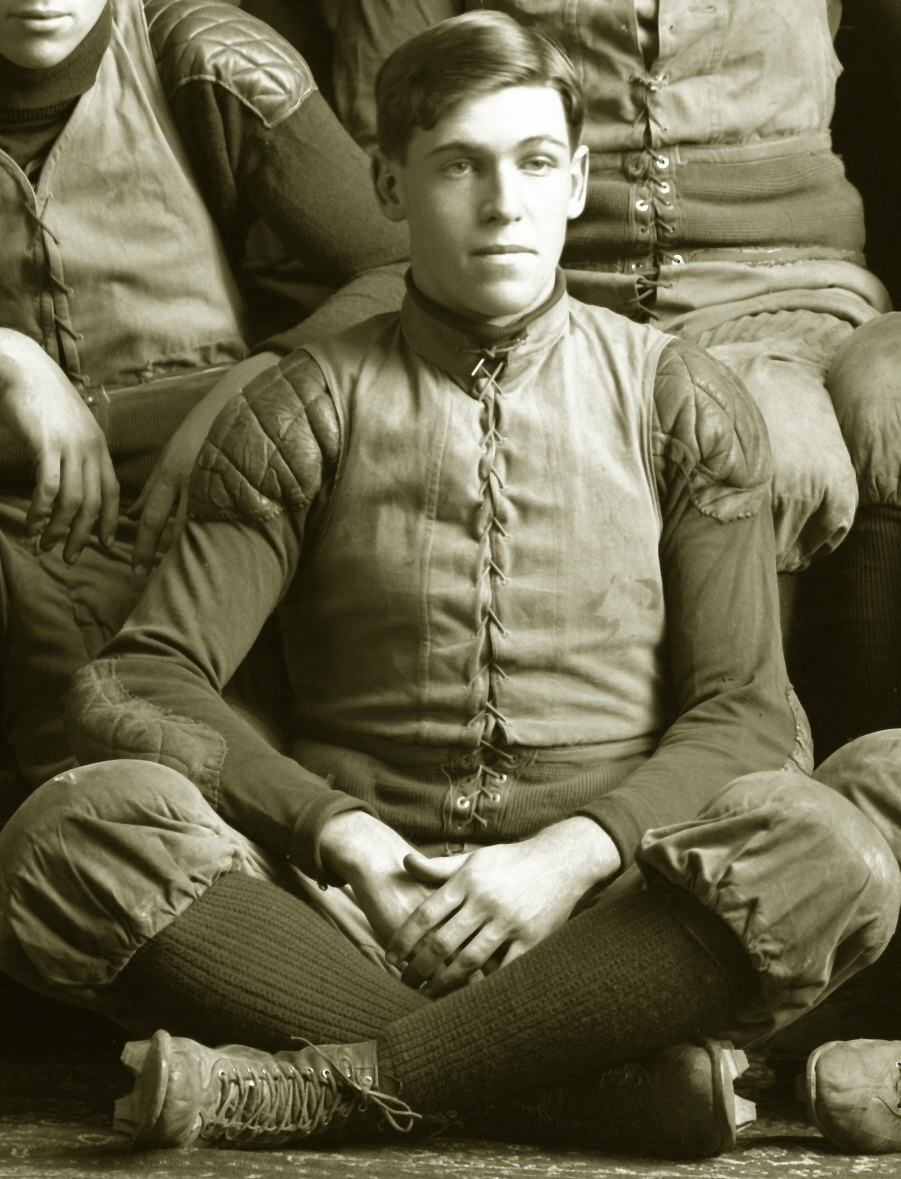
Stuart from 1904 Michigan team portrait

In 1904, Stuart enrolled in the Law Department at the University of Michigan. He received his LL.B. degree from Michigan in 1906. While attending Michigan, Stuart played as an end and halfback for Fielding H. Yost's "Point-a-Minute" football teams in 1904 and 1905. During Stuart's two years as a varsity football player, Michigan "Point-a-Minute" teams compiled a record of 22–1 and outscored opponents 1,062 to 24. The 1906 University of Michigan yearbook praised Stuart as one of the team's heroes:

'Ted' Stuart is a striking exemplification of the fact that a light man can make good in football provided that he is possessed of the proper amount of grit and determination. . . . In the fall of 1904 he entered the law department with a year's advanced standing. His punting ability attracted the attention of Coach Yost . . . No man ever showed greater improvement in one year's time than did Stuart. During the season just closed his work throughout was of a high order. He was stationed at right end in the early games and his plucky playing after he had been injured in the Nebraska game is still fresh in the minds of the rooters. In the Chicago game he was selected by Coach Yost to start the game at left half and certainly the coach had no reason to regret his choice. Speed, courage and kicking ability -- these are the attributes which have given Ted Stuart a place on the roster of Michigan's football heroes.

Stuart was also a member of Michigan's tennis team. He placed second in the singles competition at the Western Intercollegiate Tournament in June 1905. While at Michigan, Stuart was also the university tennis champion, a member of Beta Theta Pi, Phi Delta Phi, the Friars, The Barristers, and the Iowa Club.

== Coaching career ==
=== Baker ===
Stuart was the head football coach at Baker University in Baldwin City, Kansas, serving for one season, in 1909, and compiling a record of 3–0–1.

=== Colorado Mines ===
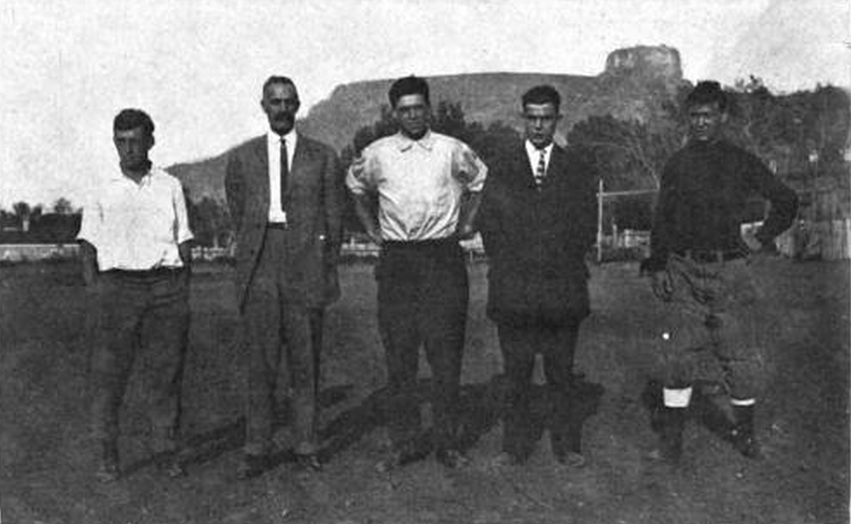
1910 Colorado School of Mines football staff (Stuart in middle)

Stuart was the head football coach at Colorado School of Mines in Golden, Colorado from 1910 to 1911. In the first issue of The Colorado School of Mines Magazine, an article described Stuart's appearance at the "first night" in the school gymnasium in September 1910: "Coach Ted Stuart, in a stirring talk, impressed upon the men the absolute necessity of all who were physically able putting on a suit and coming out and trying out for the team and staying out. He stated emphatically that he did not want 'quitters,' but wanted men with the 'Mines Spirit.'" Stuart also wrote a lengthy article in the same issue about the 1910 rules changes. Stuart noted:

The football rules governing the play of the 1910 season mark a distinctive and far-reaching step in the development of the 'new' or 'open' game, and at the same time practically deal a death blow to the 'old game' of mass plays and the 'push and pull' game. To a player of the 'old guard' the game will now present many queer features, combining some elements of basketball, soccer and English rugby, to the exclusion of nearly every semblance of the game he knew.

In two years as the head coach at the School of Mines, he compiled a record of 4–9. In March 1912, the School of Mines Magazine reported on Stuart's departure as head coach: "The position of head coach for football has been held by Ted Stuart, who is connected with a law office in Denver and consequently can not devote his entire time to the team. For this reason, and for matters of economy, as well as the fact that Johnston is fully qualified to take entire charge, the change was made."

== Family and later years ==
In 1906, Stuart returned to Chariton, Iowa, where he practiced law with his father until 1910. In 1910, he moved to Denver and began practicing law there. From 1911 to 1912, he served as the assistant attorney general of the State of Colorado. Stuart was married to Bettina B. Bradley at Centerville, Iowa in December 1911. At the time of his wedding, he reportedly "divided his time this year between coaching, duties at the statehouse and his correspondence with the girl back in Centerville." Stuart and his wife returned to Denver, where they lived at 1100 South Franklin Street. Stuart practiced law in Denver until approximately 1918. He specialized in railroad law. From 1912 until 1917, he was the assistant general solicitor for the Colorado & Southern Railway and the assistant general attorney in Colorado for the Chicago, Burlington & Quincy Railroad Company. In 1917, he became the assistant general attorney for the Denver & Rio Grande Railroad Company. He was also a director of the West Side Bank of Denver and vice president of The Progressive Mining & Leasing Company of Cripple Creek, Colorado. In a draft registration card completed on September 12, 1918, Stuart indicated that he was living with his wife, Bettina, at their home on South Franklin Street in Denver and working for the Denver & Rio Grande Railroad with an office on the fourth floor of the Equitable Building.

Stuart's wife, Bettina, died during the 1918 flu pandemic. After her death, Stuart moved to California. In September 1929, he married his second wife, Antoinette, a California native. Stuart practiced law in Fresno, California until at least 1930. At the time of the 1930 United States census, Stuart was living with Antoinette in Fresno and working as an attorney. By 1935, Stuart and Antoinette had moved to San Mateo, California, where Stuart continued to practice law. On December 31, 1945, Stuart suffered a heart attack. He was hospitalized at Mills Memorial Hospital in San Mateo for 15 days and died at age 62 on January 14, 1946. He was buried at Woodlawn Memorial Park in Burlingame, California.

== Head coaching record ==
Year	Team	Overall	Conference	Standing	Bowl/playoffs
Baker Methodists (Kansas College Athletic Conference) (1909)
1909	Baker	3–0–1			
Baker:		3–0–1			
Colorado Mines Orediggers (Rocky Mountain Conference) (1910–1911)
1910	Colorado Mines	2–4	2–4	5th	
1911	Colorado Mines	2–5	1–5	6th	
Colorado Mines:		4–9	3–9		
Total:		7–9–1			
