= 1905 All-Western college football team =

American all-star college football team

The 1905 All-Western college football team consists of American football players selected to the All-Western teams chosen by various selectors for the 1905 Western Conference football season.

== All-Western selections ==
=== Ends ===
- Mark Catlin Sr., Chicago (CA, CC, CDN, CEJ, CP, CRH, CT, ECP-1, MJ, JHR)
- Bobby Marshall, Minnesota (CC, CDN, CP, CT, ECP-1, JHR, MJ) (CFHOF)
- James Irving Bush, Wisconsin (CA, ECP-2)
- Homer Thomas, Purdue (CRH)
- Benton J. Bloom, Indiana (CEJ)
- John Garrels, Michigan (ECP-2)

=== Tackles ===
- Wilson Bertke, Minnesota (CA, CC, CDN, CEJ, CP, CRH, CT, ECP-1, JHR, MJ)
- Joe Curtis, Michigan (CA, CDN, CEJ, CP, CRH, CT, ECP-1)
- William "Bill" Ittner, Minnesota (CEJ [guard], ECP-1 [guard] JHR, MJ)
- Art Badenoch, Chicago (ECP-2)
- Percy P. Brush, Minnesota (ECP-2)

=== Guards ===
- Henry Schulte, Michigan (CA, CC, CDN, CP, CRH, ECP-1, JHR, MJ)
- Walter D. Graham, Michigan (CC, CP, CT, ECP-2, JHR, MJ)
- Merrill C. Meigs, Chicago (CDN)
- Theodore Vita, Minnesota (CA)
- Melville Archibald Hill, Chicago (CC [tackle], CT)
- Louis Donovan, Wisconsin (CRH, ECP-2)
- E. P. King, Purdue (CEJ)

=== Centers ===
- Germany Schulz, Michigan (CC, CDN, CEJ, CP, CRH, CT, ECP-2, JHR, MJ) (CFHOF)
- Richard W. Remp, Wisconsin (CA)
- Burton Pike Gale, Chicago (ECP-1)

=== Quarterbacks ===
- Walter Eckersall, Chicago (CA, CC, CDN, CEJ, CP, CRH, CT, ECP-1, JHR, MJ) (CFHOF)
- Arthur Melzner, Wisconsin (ECP-2)

=== Halfbacks ===
- Thomas S. Hammond, Michigan (CA, CC, CDN, CEJ, CP, CRH, CT, ECP-1, JHR, MJ)
- Albion Findlay, Wisconsin (CA, CC, CDN, CEJ, CP, CRH, CT, ECP-1, JHR, MJ)
- Leo DeTray, Chicago (ECP-2)
- Joseph Cutting, Minnesota (ECP-2)

=== Fullbacks ===
- Hugo Bezdek, Chicago (CA, CC, CDN, CEJ, CP, CRH, CT, ECP-1, JHR, MJ) (CFHOF)
- Leonard Roseth, Wisconsin (ECP-2)

== Key ==
CA = Chicago American

CC = Chicago Chronicle

CDN = Chicago Daily News

CEJ = Chicago Evening Journal

CP = Chicago Evening Post

CRH = Chicago Record-Herald

CT = Chicago Tribune

ECP = E. C. Patterson for Collier's Weekly

JHR = J. H. Ritchie in Illustrated Outdoor News

MJ = The Minneapolis Journal

CFHOF = College Football Hall of Fame

== See also ==
- 1905 College Football All-America Team
