= Walter McCornack =

American football player, coach, and lawyer (1875–1939)

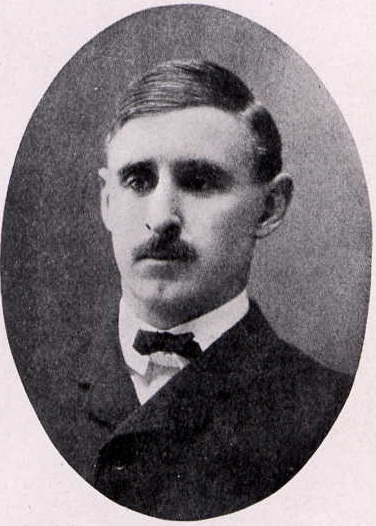
- McCornack from the 1904 Syllabus

Biographical details
- Born: January 22, 1875; Chicago, Illinois, U.S.
- Died: June 30, 1939 (aged 64); Chicago, Illinois, U.S.

Playing career
- 1893, 1895–1896: Dartmouth
- Position: Quarterback

Coaching career (HC unless noted)
- 1897-1900: Phillips Exeter Academy (NH)
- 1901–1902: Dartmouth
- 1903–1905: Northwestern

Head coaching record
- Overall: 41–8–5 (college)

Accomplishments and honors

Championships
- 1 Western (1903)

Walter Edwin McCornack (January 22, 1875 – June 30, 1939) was an American football player, coach, and lawyer. He served as the head football coach at Dartmouth College from 1901 to 1902 and at Northwestern University from 1903 to 1905, compiling a career college football coaching record of 41–8–5. McCornack's record at Northwestern was 26–5–4. His winning percentage of .800 is the highest in Northwestern Wildcats football program history.

== Early life and career ==
McCornack was born in Chicago, on January 22, 1875. He attended Chicago's Englewood High School before entering Dartmouth with the class of 1897. At Dartmouth, McCornack played football and baseball and was the captain of the football team in 1895 and 1896. McCornack graduated from Dartmouth in 1897 an earned an LLB from Northwestern in 1899.

McCornack worked as a lawyer for the Interstate Commerce Commission. McCornack died at his home in Chicago on June 30, 1939.

== Head coaching record ==
=== College ===
Year	Team	Overall	Conference	Standing	Bowl/playoffs
Dartmouth (Independent) (1901–1902)
1901	Dartmouth	9–1			
1902	Dartmouth	6–2–1			
Dartmouth:		15–3–1			
Northwestern Purple (Western Conference) (1903–1905)
1903	Northwestern	10–1–3	1–0–2	T–1st	
1904	Northwestern	8–2	1–2	T–5th	
1905	Northwestern	8–2–1	0–2	T–7th	
Northwestern:		26–5–4	2–4–2		
Total:		41–8–5			
