= James M. Sheldon =

American football player and coach (1879–1965)

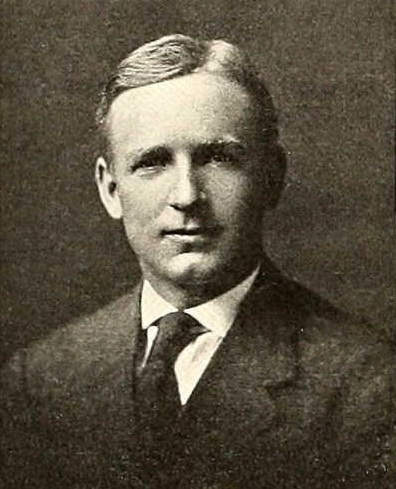
- Sheldon from The Arbutus, 1907

Biographical details
- Born: October 6, 1879; Campus, Illinois, U.S.
- Died: July 7, 1965 (aged 85); La Porte, Indiana, U.S.

Playing career

Football
- 1899–1902: Chicago
- Positions: Halfback, end

Coaching career (HC unless noted)

Football
- 1903–1904: Chicago (assistant)
- 1905–1913: Indiana

Basketball
- 1906–1907: Indiana

Administrative career (AD unless noted)
- 1907–1910: Indiana

Head coaching record
- Overall: 35–26–3 (football); 9–5 (basketball)

James Milton Sheldon Sr. (October 6, 1879 – July 7, 1965) was an American college football player, coach of college football and college basketball, and athletics administrator. He served as the head football coach at Indiana University from 1905 to 1913, while also serving as assistant professor of law, compiling a record of 35–26–3. Sheldon was also the head basketball coach at Indiana for one season, in 1906–07, tallying a mark of 9–5. In addition, he served as Indiana's athletic director from 1907 to 1910.

Sheldon was born on October 6, 1879, in Campus, Illinois. He played college football at the University of Chicago from 1899 to 1902 under Amos Alonzo Stagg, serving as team captain in 1901 and 1902. Sheldon later worked as an investment broker. He died on July 7, 1965, in La Porte, Indiana.

== Head coaching record ==
=== Football ===
Year	Team	Overall	Conference	Standing	Bowl/playoffs
Indiana Hoosiers (Big Ten Conference) (1905–1913)
1905	Indiana	8–1–1	0–1–1	6th	
1906	Indiana	4–2	0–2	7th	
1907	Indiana	2–3–1	0–3	T–6th	
1908	Indiana	3–4	1–3	T–4th	
1909	Indiana	4–3	1–3	T–5th	
1910	Indiana	6–1	3–1	3rd	
1911	Indiana	3–3–1	0–3–1	8th	
1912	Indiana	2–5	0–5	8th	
1913	Indiana	3–4	2–4	T–7th	
Indiana:		35–26–3	7–25–2		
Total:		35–26–3			
