= Thomas S. Hammond =

American businessman and soldier (1883–1950)

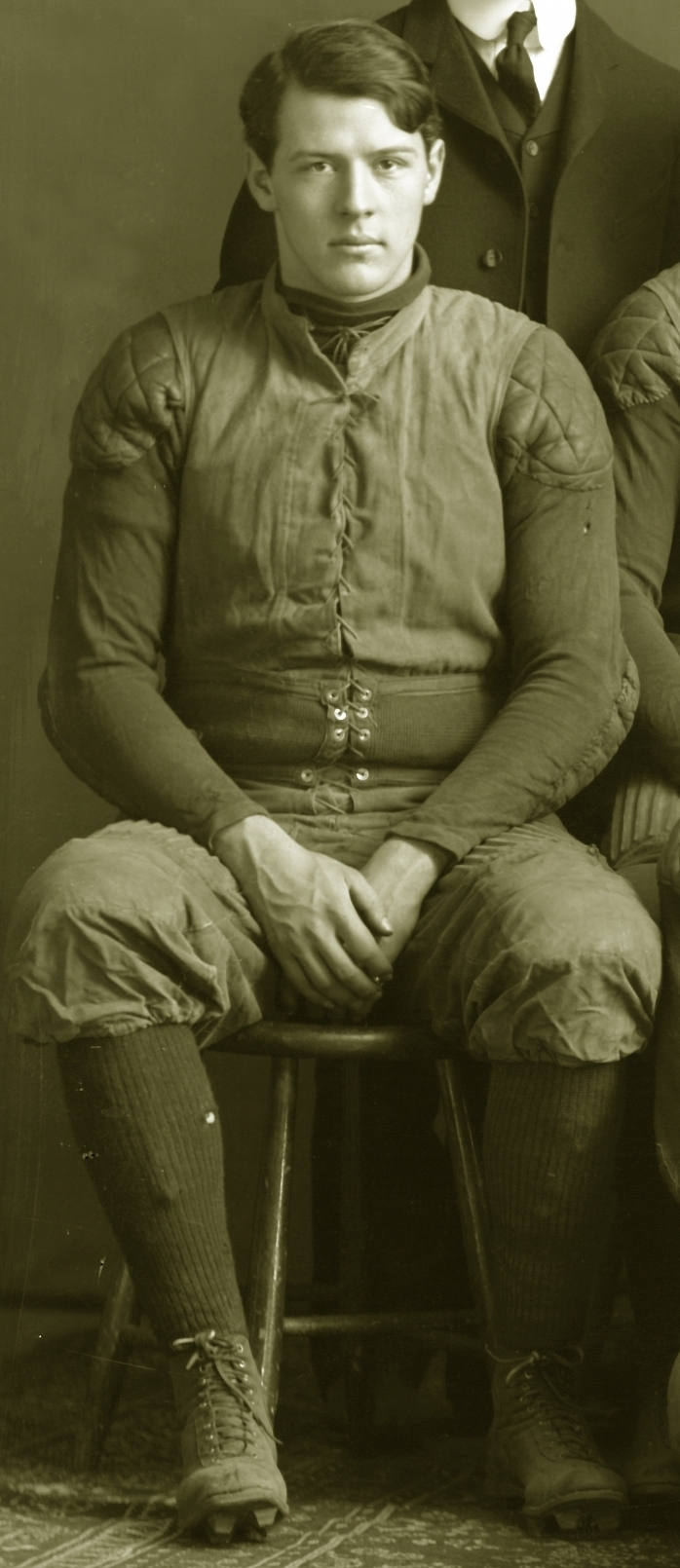
- Tom Hammond, from the 1903 Michigan Wolverines team photograph

Biographical details
- Born: October 29, 1883; Crown Point, New York, U.S.
- Died: June 15, 1950 (aged 66); Chicago, Illinois, U.S.

Playing career
- 1903–1905: Michigan
- Positions: End, halfback, fullback, tackle

Coaching career (HC unless noted)
- 1906: Ole Miss

Head coaching record
- Overall: 4–2

Accomplishments and honors

Championships
- 2× National (1903, 1904)

Awards
- Third-team All-American (1905); First-team All-Western (1905)

Thomas Stevens Hammond (October 29, 1883 – June 15, 1950) was an American business and political leader, soldier, and college football player and coach. He played football for Fielding H. Yost's renowned 1903, 1904 and 1905 "Point-a-Minute" football teams at the University of Michigan. In 1906, he served as the head coach of the Ole Miss Rebels football team. He worked for the Whiting Corporation in Harvey, Illinois, starting in 1907 and eventually became the company's president and chairman of the board. During World War I, Hammond served as an artillery officer in the Rainbow Division of the U.S. Army. He remained active in the Illinois National Guard after the war and rose to the rank of brigadier general. Hammond was also active in Republican Party politics and served as the chairman of the Illinois Citizens Republican Finance Committee and the Chicago America First Committee. During World War II, he was decorated for his work as chief of production of the Chicago ordnance district.

== Biography ==
=== Early years ===
Hammond was born in 1883 at Crown Point, New York. He came from a family that manufactured iron for generations at Crown Point. His grandfather was Brig. Gen. John Hammond, who served in the Union Army during the Civil War and later became a U.S. Congressman from New York. When the Hammond family's iron works began to suffer as a result of competition from Lake Superior iron ore, the family moved to Chicago.

The younger Hammond attended Hyde Park High School on the South Side of Chicago, Illinois. He played football at Hyde Park as the fullback in the same backfield with College Football Hall of Fame inductee Walter Eckersall. Hyde Park was undefeated for two consecutive years (1901 and 1902) with Eckersall and Hammond in the backfield, and both were selected as All-City players by the Chicago Daily Tribune for 1902. In December 1902, Coach Fielding H. Yost of the University of Michigan attended a Hyde Park game and gave Hammond points on kicking, and The New York Times called Hammond and his brother, Harry, "famous ground gainers." Hammond was captain of the 1902 Hyde Park football team and was recruited to play football by both Amos Alonzo Stagg of the University of Chicago and Yost of Michigan.

=== Michigan ===
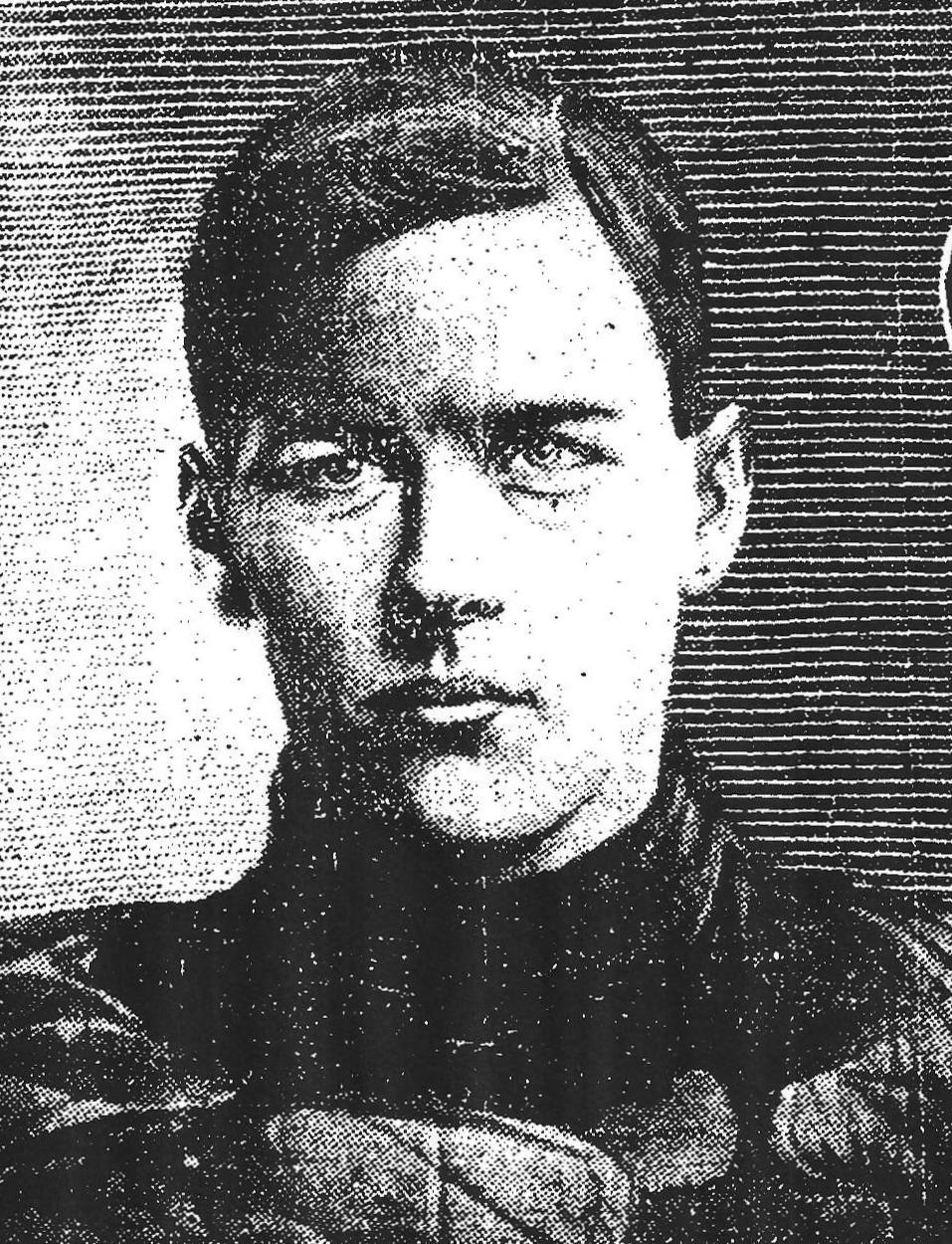
Tom Hammond of Hyde Park, Chicago Daily Tribune, Jan. 1903

In 1903, Hammond enrolled at the University of Michigan and played football on Fielding Yost's famed "Point-a-Minute" football teams from 1903 to 1905. During those years, the Michigan football team compiled a record of 33–1–1 and outscored its opponents by a combined three-year total of 1,627 to 20.

Hammond was a versatile athlete, playing both defense and offense, and at the end, halfback, fullback and tackle positions for Yost's football teams. In his first year at Michigan, Hammond led the team in scoring with 163 points on 15 touchdowns (worth five points), 63 goals after touchdown (worth one point), and five goals from field (worth five points). His 1903 point total was more than double that of any other player, including College Football Hall of Fame inductee Willie Heston (Heston had 14 touchdowns for 70 points). With an additional 88 points scored in 1904 and 109 points in 1905, Hammond's 352 points in three years ranks him among Michigan's all-time scoring leaders.

In June 1905, doubts were raised as to whether Hammond would return to play football for Michigan. Coach Yost told the press, "Tom is a law student but is only taking law as a sort of side line to his business career. He has gotten the knowledge that he needs and is anxious to join his father in the actual work of making money. His father is ready to give him the start he wants and, in all probability he will leave the university for good when he finishes his examinations this spring."

Hammond did return to complete his studies in 1905 and played a third season for Yost's football team. In November 1905, Collier's Weekly published an article by E.S. Jordan making allegations of improprieties in Michigan's football program, including the recruitment of football players. The recruitment of Hammond was alleged to be the most "flagrant case of proselyting that has come" to the attention of Western educators." Jordan claimed that Hammond failed to get through his studies at Hyde Park High School, but "was nevertheless taken to Michigan and given a brief tutoring by special instructors and was soon up in the requirements for entrance." In an article published in the Chicago Daily Tribune, Hammond defended himself:

Tom Hammond feels bad about the attack on him. He says he played at Hyde Park for three years, and that Hyde Park refused to allow any man to play who was back in his work. He admits he left there in the junior year. He admits he worked up under a tutor to enter here, and says he had to pass a stiff examination to get in. He says his work in his classes now and in summer school will indicate the sincerity of his purpose.

Michigan students were reported to be "more indignant at the attack on Hammond than at anything else in Jordan's article," noting that "Tom comes from one of the best families in Chicago, is a member of the D.K.E. fraternity here, and is considered one of the team's most upright men." The Michigan Alumnus also defended Hammond:

Mr. Hammond, it is said, was enticed away from school and admitted into the University because he was an athlete. I have the word of as truthful a man as walks, who knew the circumstances of his coming here, that Mr. Hammond was not enticed away from school, and I know of my own knowledge that the fact of his being an athlete did not facilitate his admission to college. It is impossible here to substantiate with proofs the statement that I have here made about Mr. Hammond's case. Possibly my assertion is at least as valuable as that of somebody who does not know the facts.

At the end of the 1905 season, Hammond was selected as a first-team All-Western player and was also selected by Walter Camp as a third-team All-American. In selecting Hammond as a first-team All-Western halfback, the Chicago Daily Tribune wrote: "Tom Hammond has earned the place as a halfback alone, but adds to that a valuable quantity in his ability to kick from placement and to boot out extra points after a touchdown. He is needed to turn touchdowns into goals as well as to gain ground in his irresistible tackle smashes."

Yost later called Hammond "one of the best offensive and defensive fullbacks I have ever seen." According to Yost, Hammond "never took time out and never was hurt." Hammond always played without protective padding saying, "I want them to feel my bones." Michigan's trainer Keene Fitzpatrick required Hammond to wear pads in practice, but Hammond discarded them "when it came to actual combat." Yost later recalled Hammond's performance in the 1903 Ohio State game: "I'll never forget Tom in the 1903 Ohio State Game. They were leading, 6 to 5, at the half, and Tom couldn't rest. He ripped them to pieces the second half and led Michigan to a 31 to 6 victory." The Washington Post called Hammond "one of the best all around players who ever wore a Michigan uniform."

==== Statistics ====
Year	Position	Touchdowns	Extra points	Field goals	Points
1903	Fullback, end	15	63	5	163
1904	End, tackle, halfback	6	42	4	88
1905	Fullback, halfback	15	35	2	118
Total	--	34	142	11	361

=== Mississippi ===
In May 1906, Hammond was hired as the head coach of the Ole Miss Rebels football team. He began practice with the team on September 15, 1906, and Atlanta's The Constitution reported at the time that "the squad of candidates" that turned out for Hammond's team was "decidedly small," and "the new material in sight right now is nothing to be proud of." Accordingly, the Atlanta paper noted that "those who have entertained enthusiastic hopes for a successful eleven this season are somewhat disappointed to date." Hammond spent the first two weeks with the team "drilling them daily in the elementary part of the game and impressing on them the importance of the new rules," which included legalization of the forward pass. Hammond led the Ole Miss team to a 4–2 record in 1906, including wins over LSU (9–0), Tulane (17–0) and Mississippi State (29–5). One of the team's two losses came against Vanderbilt, coached by Hammond's former University of Michigan teammate, Dan McGugin.

=== Whiting Corporation ===
In 1907, Hammond married Barbara Whiting and became purchasing agent for the Whiting Foundry Equipment Company, known after 1920 as Whiting Corporation. Hammond spent his career with the Whiting Corporation, in time becoming its general manager, president and chairman of the board. The company was founded in 1884 by Hammond's father-in-law, John Hill Whiting, and moved to Harvey, Illinois, in 1893. The company is a manufacturer of heavy equipment, including cranes and lifting equipment.

=== World War I and military service ===
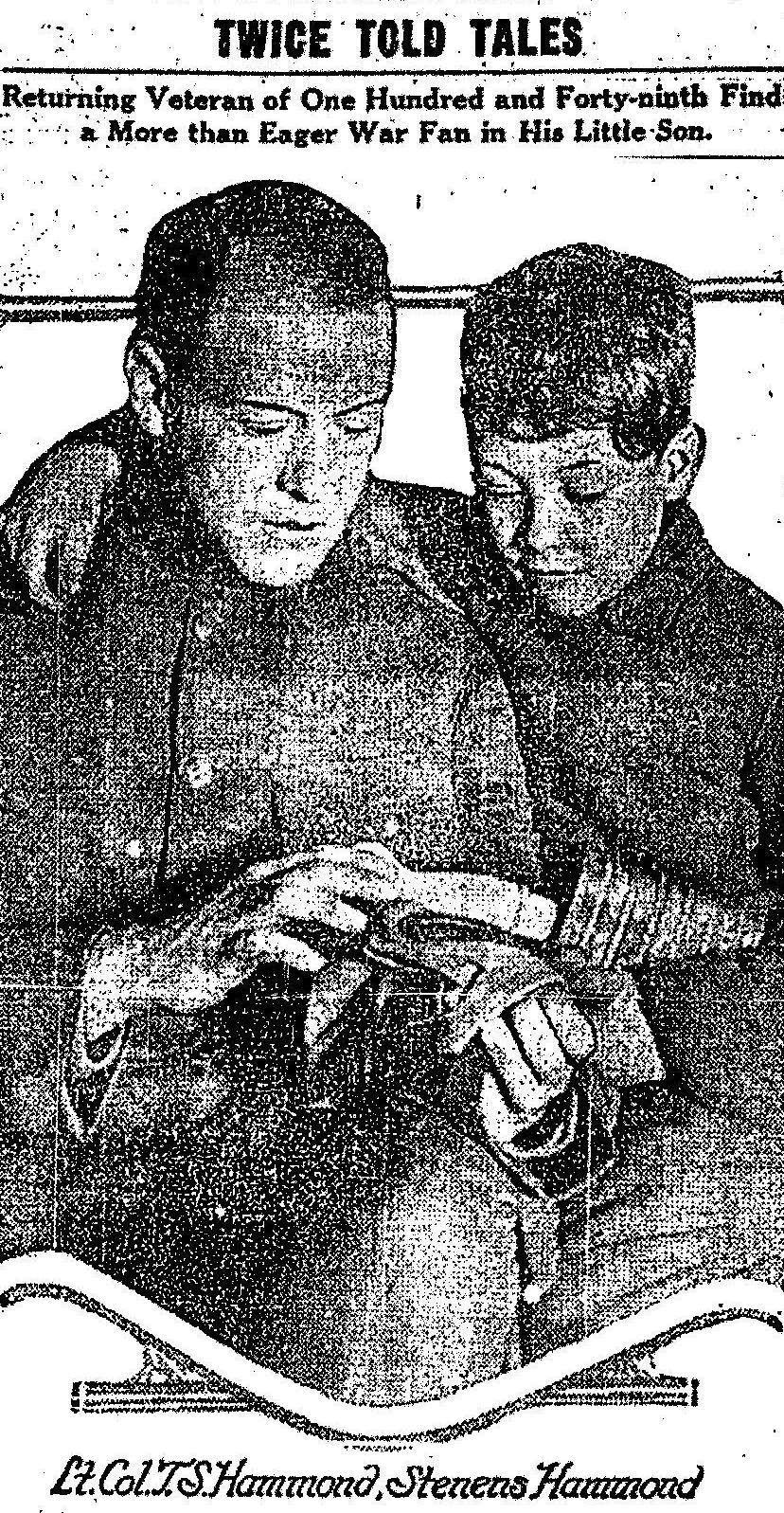
Hammond shows his son the gas mask he used in France, Chicago Daily Tribune, March 1919

Prior to World War I, Hammond was a member of the Illinois National Guard. When the United States entered World War I in the spring of 1917, Hammond was a first lieutenant of field artillery in the National Guard. He served for two years in the U.S. Army during and after the war. After several months serving on the Mexican border, Hammond was deployed to France as part of the 42nd Infantry Division, the famed "Rainbow Division." He was promoted from captain to major and eventually achieved the rank of lieutenant colonel. He was placed in command of the First Battalion of the 149th Field Artillery Regiment and participated in the final rush of American forces in the Meuse–Argonne offensive. Hammond left his command while serving in Germany in January 1919 and returned to civilian life in Chicago in March 1919. In an interview with the Chicago Daily Tribune, Hammond said the Germans feared the Americans, because they were "fighting all the time." He noted, "You can be assured that there was no 'gentlemanly agreement' with the 149th. They fought. That tells the whole story."

At the end of World War I, Hammond returned to the Illinois National Guard. He was promoted to the rank of colonel in 1921 and brigadier general in 1931. In 1932, he was recognized as Brigadier General in the U.S. Army Reserves.

=== Politics and civic work ===
Beginning in 1923 and continuing until at least 1933, Hammond was also a member of University of Michigan Board in Control of Athletics. Hammond served as the president of the Illinois Manufacturers' Association for the first several months of 1933. He resigned the position in July 1933 to serve in the Franklin Roosevelt administration as the executive director of the emergency re-employment campaign of the National Recovery Administration ("NRA"). Hammond resigned from his NRA position in November 1933. Immediately before his resignation, it was reported that Hammond disagreed with the administration's policy of giving powers to NRA boards that would weaken industry's self government. On the day Hammond's resignation was announced, fellow Chicago industrialist J.L. Kraft of Kraft Cheese Corp. stated that the NRA was run by "hairbrained professors, most of them with communistic tendencies who could not successfully operate a peanut stand." While initially denying any difference of opinion with the NRA, Hammond later stated that he found the economic principles of the New Deal to be incompatible with his own, commenting that NRA means "Nuts Run America."

In November 1935, Hammond was selected to serve a second term as president of the Illinois Manufacturers Association for the year 1936. He was also elected to the Illinois Bell board of directors in 1937.

In 1940, Hammond was appointed chairman of the Illinois Citizens Republican Finance Committee, the Republican Party's fund-raising organization in Illinois. In December 1940, Hammond was also appointed chairman of the Chicago chapter of the America First Committee, an organization opposed to U.S. intervention in the war in Europe. Hammond said at the time, "Our purpose is to marshal public opinion behind the committee's announced program of building an impregnable defense for America and giving expression to public sentiment for keeping America out of the European war."

In January 1942, following the United States' entry into World War II, Hammond resigned his positions as president and director of Whiting Corporation to devote his full efforts to the work of the Chicago ordnance district. He was named chief of the Chicago district in August 1942, and was charged with facilitating the output of war material by Chicago factories and working as a liaison between private industry and the military. In May 1944, Hammond was given an award by Lieutenant General B.B. Somervell in recognition of "outstanding contributions to the operations of the Chicago ordnance district." The citation stated: "Thru Gen. Hammond's constant attention to duty, his resourcefulness and his sound judgment as head of the Chicago ordnance district, and thru his extraordinary insight into industrial capacities and adaptabilities, he has rendered valuable service to the war effort of his country."

=== Hammond brothers ===
Hammond had four brothers, each of whom were amateur athletes. His older brother, John S. Hammond, was a track and field competitor and football player at the United States Military Academy and was the founder of the New York Rangers. Brother Harry S. Hammond played football with Thomas at Michigan. The other two brothers were Robert Hammond, who also worked for the Whiting Corporation, and architect C. Herrick Hammond.

=== Death ===
Hammond died at his home on Chicago's Lake Shore Drive (No. 1448) in June 1950 at age 66. He underwent surgery in early February 1950 and traveled to California following the operation. He returned to Chicago when his condition failed to improve. He was survived by his wife, the former Barbara Whiting, and their two sons, Stevens Hill Hammond and Thomas Lyman Hammond. His funeral was held at St. Chrysostom's Episcopal Church in Chicago.

== Head coaching record ==
Year	Team	Overall	Conference	Standing	Bowl/playoffs
Ole Miss Rebels (Southern Intercollegiate Athletic Association) (1906)
1906	Ole Miss	4–2	3–2	6th	
Ole Miss:		4–2	3–2		
Total:		4–2			
