= 1905 Michigan Wolverines football team =

American college football season

1905 Michigan Wolverines football
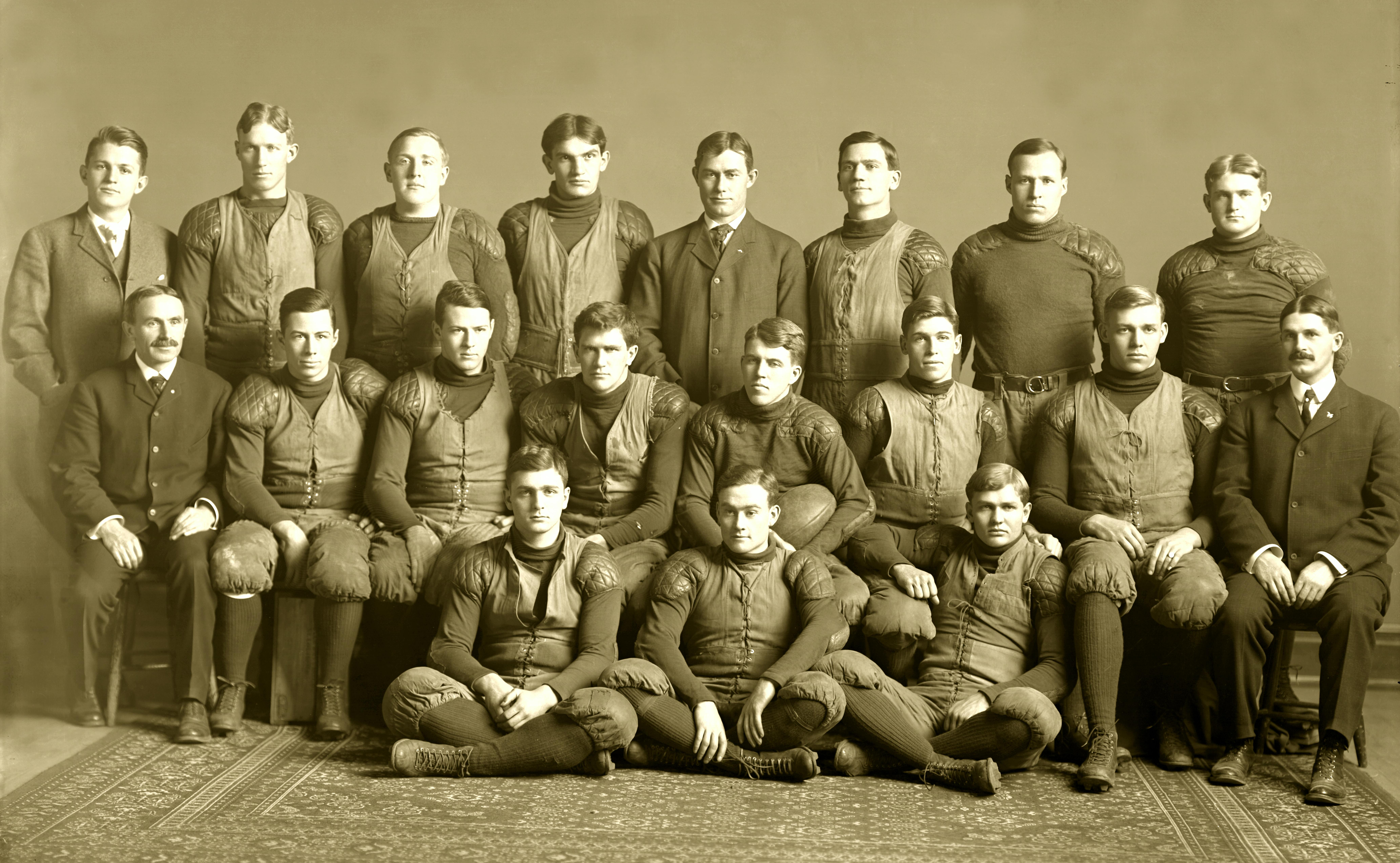
- Conference: Western Conference
- Record: 12–1 (2–1 Western)
- Head coach: Fielding H. Yost (5th season)
- Offensive scheme: Short punt
- Captain: Fred Norcross
- Home stadium: Regents Field

1905 Western Conference football standings
	Conf.					Overall
Team	W		L		T	W		L		T
Chicago $	7	–	0	–	0	11	–	0	–	0
Michigan	2	–	1	–	0	12	–	1	–	0
Minnesota	2	–	1	–	0	10	–	1	–	0
Purdue	1	–	1	–	1	6	–	1	–	1
Wisconsin	1	–	2	–	0	8	–	2	–	0
Indiana	0	–	1	–	1	8	–	1	–	1
Iowa	0	–	2	–	0	8	–	2	–	0
Northwestern	0	–	2	–	0	8	–	2	–	1
Illinois	0	–	3	–	0	5	–	4	–	0
$ – Conference champion

The 1905 Michigan Wolverines football team represented the University of Michigan in the 1905 Western Conference football season. The team's head football coach was Fielding H. Yost. The Wolverines played their home games at Regents Field. After winning the first 12 games of the season by a combined score of 495–0, the team lost the final game of the season by a score of 2–0 against the Chicago Maroons.

== Schedule ==
Date	Opponent	Site	Result	Attendance
September 30	Ohio Wesleyan*	Regents Field; Ann Arbor, MI	W 65–0	
October 4	Kalamazoo*	Regents Field; Ann Arbor, MI	W 44–0	
October 7	Case*	Regents Field; Ann Arbor, MI	W 36–0	
October 11	Ohio Northern*	Regents Field; Ann Arbor, MI	W 23–0	
October 14	Vanderbilt*	Regents Field; Ann Arbor, MI	W 18–0	
October 21	Nebraska*	Regents Field; Ann Arbor, MI	W 31–0	5,000
October 25	Albion*	Regents Field; Ann Arbor, MI	W 70–0	
October 28	Drake*	Regents Field; Ann Arbor, MI	W 48–0	
November 4	at Illinois	Illinois Field; Champaign, IL (rivalry)	W 33–0	6,000
November 11	Ohio State*	Regents Field; Ann Arbor, MI (rivalry)	W 40–0	8,000
November 18	Wisconsin^{†}	Regents Field; Ann Arbor, MI	W 12–0	17,000
November 25	Oberlin*	Regents Field; Ann Arbor, MI	W 75–0	
November 30	at Chicago	Marshall Field; Chicago, IL (rivalry)	L 0–2	27,000
*Non-conference game; ^{†}Homecoming

== Preseason ==
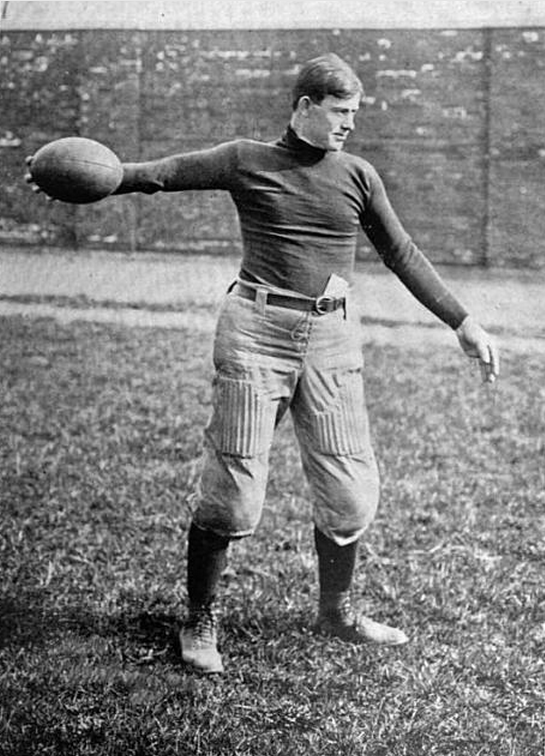
Fielding Yost from The Michigan Alumnus, Oct. 1905

The 1905 football team returned 11 varsity letter winners from the 1904 team. The only letter winners not returning from 1904 were Willie Heston and Babe Carter. Center Germany Schulz, who had played as a freshman in 1904, was expected to be the best center in the west during the 1905 season. The line also returned "Octopus" Graham, Henry Schulte, and Joe Curtis. Fred Norcross also returned as the team's starting quarterback. In the backfield, several players were in competition to replace Heston at left halfback. Tom Hammond returned at right halfback. At fullback, Frank Longman sustained a knee injury that was expected to keep him on the sidelines for the early part of the season. Track star John Garrels had shown promise in 1904 and was the fastest man on the Michigan team.

== Game summaries ==
=== Michigan 65, Ohio Wesleyan 0 ===
In the first game of the 1905 season was played on a warm day with the field at Ferry Field in excellent condition. Michigan defeated the team from Ohio Wesleyan University 65-0 and was reported to have "over, through and around" the opposition. Fred Norcross ran for 144 yards in the first half, including a 70-yard touchdown run. Hammond was Michigan's high scorer with 25 points on four touchdowns (five points each) and five point after touchdown kicks.

The game was played in halves of 18.5 minutes and 15 minutes. In the first game, Michigan scored 65 points in 33.5 minutes. Michigan's starting lineup was Garrels (left end), Curtis (left tackle), Love (left guard), Clement (center), Graham (right guard), Patrick (right tackle), Stuart (right end), Norcross (quarterback), Dunlap (left halfback), Workman (right halfback), Hammond (fullback).

Player	Position	Starter	Touchdowns	Extra points	Field goals	Points
Hammond	Fullback	Yes	4	5	0	25
Workman	Right halfback	Yes	3	0	0	15
Curtis	Left tackle	Yes	0	5	0	5
Norcross	Quarterback	Yes	1	0	0	5
Garrels	Left end	Yes	1	0	0	5
Rumney	Right halfback	No	1	0	0	5
Love	Left guard	Yes	1	0	0	5
Total	--	--	11	10	0	65

=== Michigan 44, Kalamazoo 0 ===
In the second game of the season, played at Ferry Field, Michigan defeated the team from Kalamazoo College 44-0. Despite the one-sided score, The Michigan Alumnus complained, "The whole offensive work was ragged and spiritless, the warm weather having much to do with this."

The game was played in halves of 20 minutes and 15 minutes. Through two games, Michigan had scored 109 points in 68.5 minutes. Michigan's starting lineup was Garrels (left end), Curtis (left tackle), Love (left guard), Clement (center), Graham (right guard), Patrick (right tackle), Stuart (right end), Norcross (quarterback), Dunlap (left halfback), Workman (right halfback), Rumney (fullback).

Player	Position	Starter	Touchdowns	Extra points	Field goals	Safeties	Points
T. Hammond	Fullback	Yes	2	7	0	0	17
Curtis	Left tackle	Yes	3	0	0	0	15
Rumney	Right halfback	Yes	1	0	0	0	5
Dunlap	Left halfback	Yes	1	0	0	0	5
No player credited	--	--	0	0	0	1	2
Total	--	--	7	7	0	1	44

=== Michigan 36, Case 0 ===
The third game of the season matched Michigan against Case. With most of the game played by the "scrubs," Michigan defeated Case 36-0. In his first start at left halfback, Paul Magoffin had a 75-yard run against Case.

The game was played in halves of 20 minutes each. Through three games, Michigan had scored 145 points in 108.5 minutes.

Player	Position	Starter	Touchdowns	Extra points	Field goals	Points
T. Hammond	Fullback	Yes	2	5	0	15
Curtis	Left tackle	Yes	2	1	0	11
Magoffin	Left halfback	Yes	1	0	0	5
Garrels	Left end	Yes	1	0	0	5
Total	--	--	6	6	0	36

=== Michigan 23, Ohio Northern 0 ===
Michigan played its fourth consecutive home game against Ohio Northern on October 11, 1905. The game was played on a wet field, and Michigan's play was described by The Michigan Alumnus as ragged. A highlight of the game was John Garrels' 65-yard run, "using the straight arm with good results."

The game was played in halves of 19 minutes and 10 minutes. Through four games, Michigan had scored 168 points in 137.5 minutes. Michigan's starting lineup was Garrels (left end), Curtis (left tackle), Love (left guard), Clement (center), Graham (right guard), Patrick (right tackle), Stuart (right end), Norcross (quarterback), Magoffin (left halfback), Workman (right halfback), Weeks (fullback).

Player	Position	Starter	Touchdowns	Extra points	Field goals	Points
Curtis	Left tackle	Yes	2	3	0	13
Garrels	Left end	Yes	2	0	0	10
Total	--	--	4	3	0	23

=== Michigan 18, Vanderbilt 0 ===
In the fifth game of the season, Vanderbilt, coached Yost's former player and assistant coach Dan McGugin, traveled to Ann Arbor. Michigan won the game 18-0. The game was played in halves of 25 minutes each. Through five games, Michigan had scored 186 points in 187.5 minutes. Michigan's starting lineup was Garrels (left end), Curtis (left tackle), Schulte (left guard), Schultz (center), Graham (right guard), Rheinschild (right tackle), Stuart (right end), Norcross (quarterback), Magoffin (left halfback), T. Hammond (right halfback), Weeks (fullback).

Player	Position	Starter	Touchdowns	Extra points	Field goals	Points
Hammond	Right halfback	Yes	1	3	0	8
Curtis	Left tackle	Yes	1	0	0	5
Magoffin	Left halfback	Yes	1	0	0	5
Total	--	--	3	3	0	18

=== Cancelled game with Denison ===
Michigan had planned a mid-week game against Denison University for Wednesday, October 18, 1905. That game was cancelled due to rain and the wet condition of Ferry Field. The Michigan Alumnus noted: "It is not often that Michigan shirks the dampness, but [Fielding] Yost and [Fred] Norcross feared to risk injuring any player so soon before the Nebraska game."

=== Michigan 31, Nebraska 0 ===
On October 21, 1905, Michigan faced Nebraska. Although the final score was 31-0, The Michigan Alumnus noted that Michigan did not score in the first half and observed:

"Seldom has a more exciting contest been witnessed on Ferry Field . . . For the first time in the season the apostles of the 'hurry-up' gospel met foemen worthy of their very best efforts." The publication credited Michigan's second half scoring on Keene Fitzpatrick's training which lad left the Wolverines in "splendid physical condition." Tom Hammond scored 16 of Michigan's points on a touchdown, three point after touchdown kicks, and two field goals.

The game was played in halves of 35 minutes each. Through six games, Michigan had scored 217 points in 257.5 minutes.

Player	Position	Starter	Touchdowns	Extra points	Field goals	Points
Hammond	Right halfback	Yes	1	3	2	16
Longman	Fullback	Yes	1	0	0	5
Clark	Left halfback	No	1	0	0	5
Weeks	Left halfback	Yes	1	0	0	5
Total	--	--	4	3	2	31

=== Michigan 70, Albion 0 ===
After the Nebraska game, Michigan faced Albion in a mid-week game in Ann Arbor. Despite the 70-0 score, and being held on downs only once, The Michigan Alumnus found the performance to be less than ideal: "The playing was rather ragged, the team work being decidedly below standard."

The game was played in halves of 25 minutes and 14.5 minutes. Through seven games, Michigan had scored 287 points in 297 minutes. Michigan's starting lineup was Garrels (left end), Curtis (left tackle), Love (left guard), Shultz (center), Graham (right guard), Rheinschild (right tackle), Newton (right end), Barlow (quarterback), Weeks (left halfback), Kanaja (right halfback), and Embs (fullback).

Player	Position	Starter	Touchdowns	Extra points	Field goals	Points
Curtis	Left tackle	Yes	1	10	0	15
Embs	Fullback	Yes	3	0	0	15
Graham	Right guard	Yes	3	0	0	15
Hammond	Right halfback	Yes	2	0	0	10
Weeks	Left halfback	Yes	1	0	0	5
Magoffin	Left halfback	No	1	0	0	5
Love	Left halfback	Yes	1	0	0	5
Total	--	--	12	10	0	70

=== Michigan 48, Drake 0 ===
On October 28, 1905, Yost faced another of his pupils. Willie Heston, who had accepted the position of head coach at Drake, brought his team to Ann Arbor. The Drake team was reported to have played "pluckily," but was "crippled and badly outclassed."

The game was played in halves of 25 minutes and 20 minutes. Through eight games, Michigan had scored 335 points in 342 minutes.

At the end of October, The Michigan Alumnus wrote that the team's "ragged work" had "marred" the early games. With the team's tendency to fumble, the publication wrote that "one would have thought the Wolverines' fingers had been greased." In comparing it to Yost's prior teams, the Alumnus wrote: "It is not, perhaps, the best team which Yost has ever coached. In all probability the team of 1901 could defeat it by two or three touchdowns."

Player	Position	Starter	Touchdowns	Extra points	Field goals	Points
Weeks	Fullback	Yes	3	0	0	15
Hammond	Right halfback	No	2	1	0	11
Curtis	Left tackle	Yes	0	7	0	7
Garrels	Left end	Yes	1	0	0	5
Barlow	Quarterback	Yes	1	0	0	5
Sculte	Left guard	Yes	1	0	0	5
Total	--	--	8	8	0	48

=== Michigan 33, Illinois 0 ===
On November 4, 1905, Michigan played its first road game of the season against Illinois. The running and punting of Alfred Barlow, substituting at quarterback, were reported to be features of the game.

The game was played in halves of 35 minutes each. Through nine games, Michigan had scored 368 points in 412 minutes. Michigan's starting lineup was Garrels (left end), Curtis (left tackle), Schulte (left guard), Schultz (center), Graham (right guard), Rheinschild (right tackle), H. Hammond (right end), Workman (quarterback), T. Hammond (right halfback), Magoffin (left halfback), Clark (fullback).

Player	Position	Starter	Touchdowns	Extra points	Field goals	Points
Clark	Fullback	Yes	2	0	0	10
T. Hammond	Right halfback	Yes	0	4	1	8
Schulte	Left guard	Yes	1	0	0	5
Weeks	Fullback	No	1	0	0	5
Barlow	Quarterback	Yes	1	0	0	5
Total	--	--	5	4	1	33

=== Michigan 40, Ohio State 0 ===
The Wolverines returned to Ann Arbor for their November 8 game against Ohio State. Michigan played many of its substitutes in the game, starting Barlow at quarterback and Fred Newton at fullback. The game featured a 105-yard run by Barlow, described as "the longest ever seen on Ferry Field." Barlow returned a missed dropkick from five yards deep in Michigan's endzone. Almost tackled at the 40-yard line, Barlow was aided by his teammates' blocking and returned the ball all the way for a touchdown. A large number of Ohio State fans attended the game, and the supporters of the two schools were reported to be on such friendly terms that the Ohio State band played "Men of Yost," and the Michigan supporters "returned the compliment by giving the Ohio yell."

The game was played in halves of 35 minutes each. Through ten games, Michigan had scored 408 points in 482 minutes.

Player	Position	Starter	Touchdowns	Extra points	Field goals	Points
T. Hammond	Right halfback	Yes	1	4	1	13
Curtis	Left tackle	Yes	2	2	0	12
Garrels	Left end	Yes	1	0	0	5
Patrick	Left halfback	Yes	1	0	0	5
Barlow	Quarterback	Yes	1	0	0	5
Total	--	--	6	6	1	40

=== Michigan 12, Wisconsin 0 ===
1905 Michigan-Wisconsin game
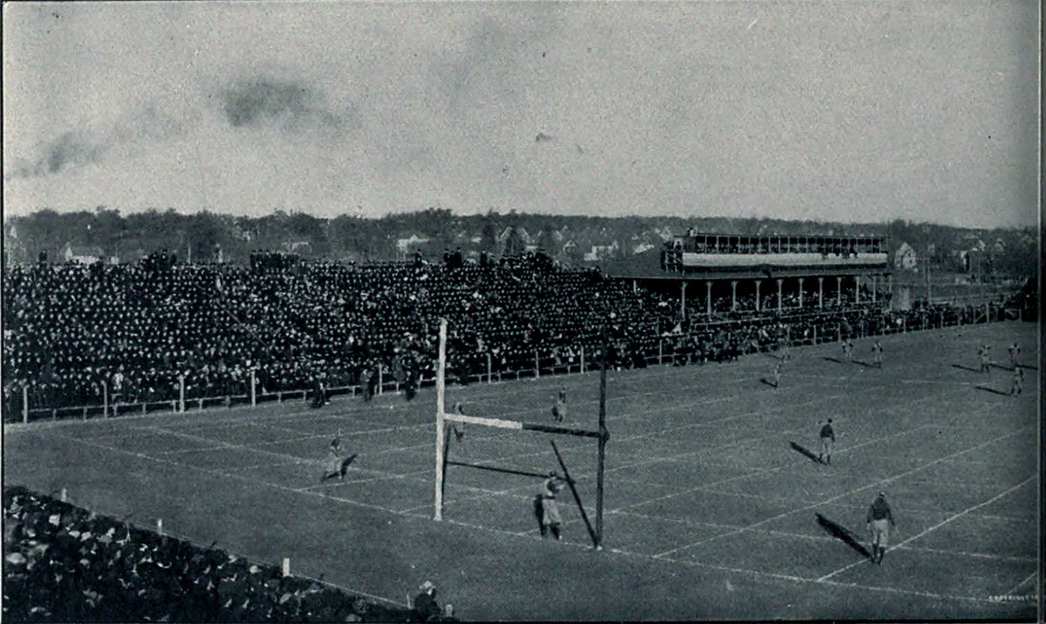
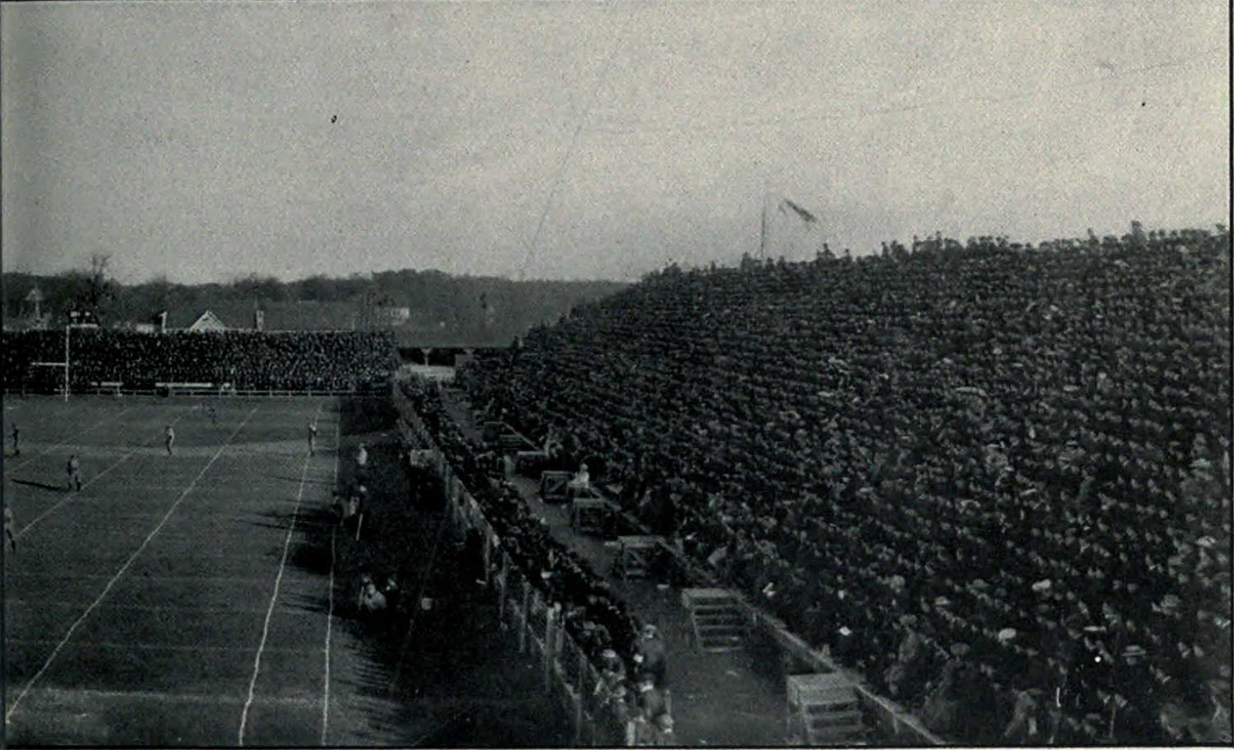

On November 18, 1905, Wisconsin traveled to Ann Arbor. In front of a crowd estimated at nearly 18,000 people, Michigan won by a score of 12-0. During the second half, a temporary bleacher with 2,000 persons on it collapsed. Three or four spectators sustained "more or less severe injuries," but none were killed. A warning was given before the collapse that the timber was weakening, the statement was reported to have not been taken seriously. Frank Longman scored both of Michigan's touchdowns, and Tom Hammond converted on both point after touchdown kicks.

The game was played in halves of 35 minutes each. Through 11 games, Michigan had scored 420 points in 552 minutes. Michigan's starting lineup was Garrels (left end), Curtis (left tackle), Schulte (left guard), Schultz (center), Graham (right guard), Rheinschild (right tackle), H. Hammond (right end), Norcross (quarterback), Weeks (left halfback), T. Hammond (right halfback), Longman (fullback).

Player	Position	Starter	Touchdowns	Extra points	Field goals	Points
Longman	Fullback	Yes	2	0	0	10
T. Hammond	Right halfback	Yes	0	2	0	2
Total	--	--	2	2	0	12

=== Michigan 75, Oberlin 0 ===
On November 25, 1905, Michigan defeated the Oberlin Congregationalists 75-0. The Michigan Alumnus noted that Oberlin came close to scoring in the game: "It was a comedy that was almost turned into a tragedy when the plucky Congregationalist end, Featherstone, got away with the ball. Barlow missed him, and had not Schultz succeeded in reaching him Michigan would surely have been scored on."

The game was played in halves of 25 minutes and 19 minutes. Through 12 games, Michigan had scored 495 points in 596 minutes. Michigan's starting lineup was Garrels (left end), Curtis (left tackle), Clement (left guard), Schultz (center), Graham (right guard), Love (right tackle), H. Hammond (right end), Barlow (quarterback), Patrick (left halfback), Clark (right halfback), Embs (fullback).

Player	Position	Starter	Touchdowns	Extra points	Field goals	Points
Curtis	Fullback	Yes	4	2	0	22
Magoffin	Left halfback	No	3	0	0	15
Garrels	Left end	Yes	1	8	0	13
Stuart	Right halfback	Yes	2	0	0	10
Clark	Right halfback	Yes	1	0	0	5
Schultz	Center	Yes	1	0	0	5
Love	Right tackle	Yes	1	0	0	5
Total	--	--	13	10	0	75

=== Chicago 2, Michigan 0 ===
Western Championship Match
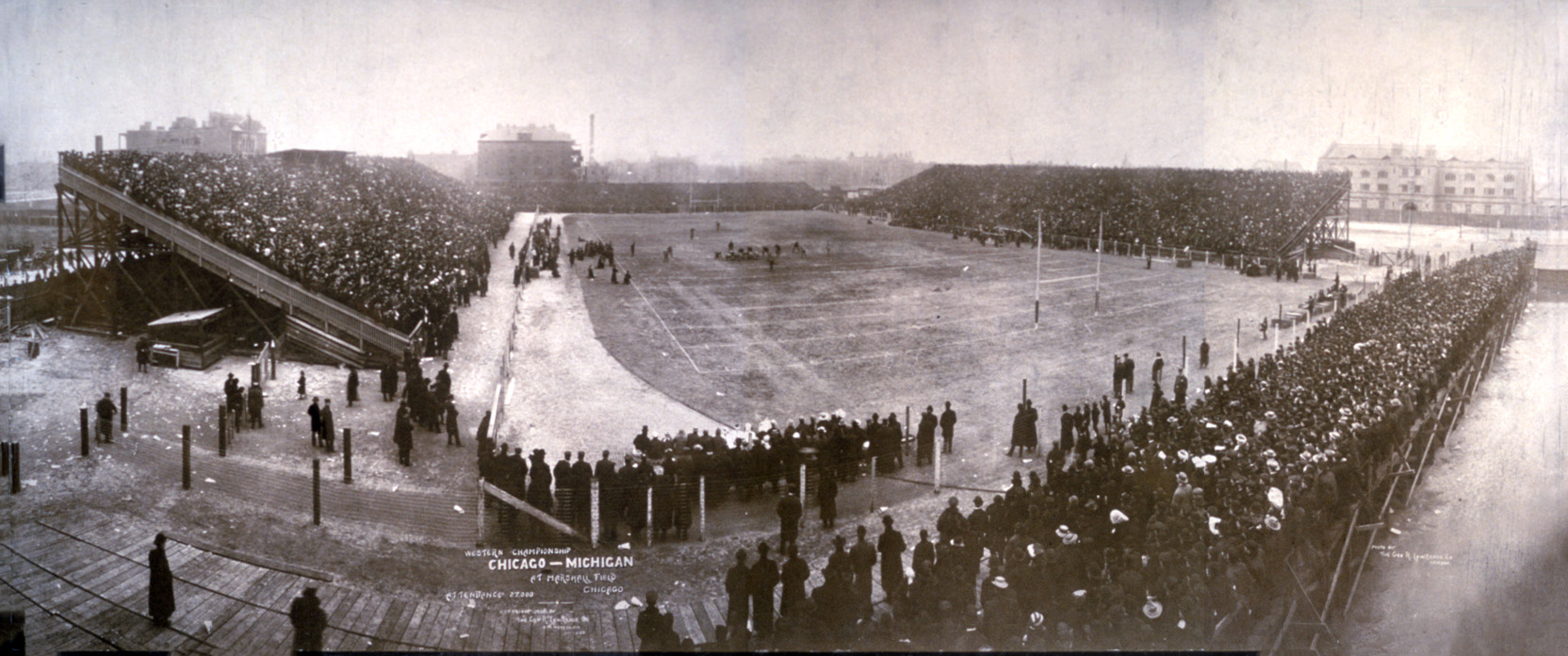

The game, dubbed "The First Greatest Game of the Century," broke Michigan's 56-game unbeaten streak and marked the end of the "Point-a-Minute" years. The 1905 Michigan team had outscored opponents 495-0 in its first 12 games. The game was lost in the final ten minutes of play when Denny Clark was tackled for a safety as he attempted to return a punt from behind the goal line. Newspapers described Clark's play as "the wretched blunder" and a "lapse of brain work." Clark transferred to M.I.T. the following year and was haunted by the play for the rest of his life. In 1932, he shot himself, leaving a suicide note that reportedly expressed hope that his "final play" would atone for his error at Marshall Field in 1905.

The game was played in halves of 35 minutes each. Through 13 games, Michigan scored 495 points in 666 minutes.

== Scoring summary ==
The following chart accounts for the 495 points scored by the 1905 football team and is based on the box scores published in 1905 by the Detroit Free Press and The Michigan Alumnus.

Player	Touchdowns (5 points)	Extra points 1 point	Field goals (4 points)	Safeties (2 points)	Total Points
Tom Hammond	15	35	2	0	118
Joe Curtis	15	30	0	0	105
John Garrels	7	8	0	0	43
Paul Magoffin	6	0	0	0	30
Harold Weeks	6	0	0	0	30
William Dennison Clark	4	0	0	0	20
Walter Graham	3	0	0	0	15
Jay Mack Love	3	0	0	0	15
Alfred Barlow	3	0	0	0	15
Frank Longman	3	0	0	0	15
William Embs	3	0	0	0	15
Harry Workman	3	0	0	0	15
Ted Stuart	2	0	0	0	10
Mason Rumney	2	0	0	0	10
Henry Schulte	2	0	0	0	5
Germany Schultz	1	0	0	0	5
Fred Norcross	1	0	0	0	5
Harry Patrick	1	0	0	0	5
Lewis Dunlap	1	0	0	0	5
na	0	0	0	1	2
Total	81	73	2	1	495

== Players ==
=== Varsity letter winners ===
The following 15 players received varsity "M" letters for their participation on the 1905 football team:

Player	Position	Games started	Hometown
Alfred Barlow	Quarterback	5	Corry, Pennsylvania
William Dennison Clark	Fullback; Right halfback	1; 1	Detroit, Michigan
Joe Curtis	Left tackle	13	Brooklyn, New York
John Garrels	Left end	13	Detroit, Michigan
Walter D. Graham	Right guard Right tackle	12; 1	Chicago, Illinois
Harry S. Hammond	Right end	5	Chicago, Illinois
Tom Hammond	Right halfback Fullback; Left halfback	6; 3; 1	Chicago, Illinois
Frank Longman	Fullback	3	Battle Creek, Michigan
Paul Magoffin	Left halfback	4	Washington, D.C.
Fred Norcross	Quarterback	8	Menominee, Michigan
Harry E. Patrick	Right tackle Left halfback	4; 2	Detroit, Michigan
Walter Rheinschild	Right tackle	7	Los Angeles, California
Henry Schulte	Left guard	7	Jefferson Barracks, Missouri
Germany Schulz	Center	9	Fort Wayne, Indiana
Ted Stuart	Right end Right halfback	7; 1	Chariton, Iowa

=== Reserves ===
The following 25 players received "R" letters for their participation on the 1905 football team:

- Eugene G. Ackerman, Martinsville, New York
- Alexander M. Barnes, Cedar Rapids, Iowa
- Edward Munroe Benson, Detroit, MI
- Carl Bergin, Lowell, Michigan
- William Casey, Cedar Falls, Iowa
- Albert R. Chandler, Salem, Massachusetts
- Carl Howard Clement, Brooklyn, New York - started 4 games at center, 1 game at left guard
- Frank Doty, Pontiac, Michigan
- Lewis Dunlap - started 3 games at left halfback, 1 game at right halfback
- William John Embs, Escanaba, Michigan - started 3 games at fullback
- Albert de Valois Evans, Cheboygan, Michigan
- Mason Gray, Pontiac, Michigan
- Ben Harris, Salt Lake City, Utah
- Guy T. Helvering, Beattie, Kansas (later served in U.S. Congress)
- Eber Dunbar Kanaga, Charlevoix, Michigan - started 1 game at right halfback
- Jesse R. Langley, Alva, Oklahoma
- Jay Mack Love, Arkansas City, Kansas - started 5 games at left guard, 1 game at right guard, 1 game at right tackle
- William Joseph Miller, Escanaba, Michigan
- Fred B. Newton, Portland, Oregon - started 1 game at right end
- Duncan H. Pierce, Buffalo, New York
- Mason P. Rumney, Detroit, MI - started 1 game at right halfback
- Newton Gard Van Ness, Cassopolis, Michigan
- Howard Withey, Reed City, Michigan
- Paul Work, Elkhart, Indiana
- Harry A. Workman, Chicago, IL - started 1 game at left halfback, 1 game at right halfback

=== Others ===
- Harry S. Bartlett, Detroit, Michigan
- David L. Dunlap, Hopkinton, Iowa - halfback
- Walter L. Eyke, Muskegon, Michigan
- Harold Weeks, Allegan, Michigan - started 3 games at fullback, 2 games at left halfback

== Awards and honors ==
- Captain: Fred Norcross
- All-Americans: Thomas S. Hammond (WC-3), Henry Schulte (WC-2)
- All-Conference: Thomas S. Hammond (Chicago Tribune), Frank Longman, Joe Curtis (Chicago Tribune), Germany Schulz (Chicago Tribune), Henry Schulte

== Coaching staff ==
- Head coach: Fielding H. Yost
- Assistant coach: Leigh C. Turner
- Trainer: Keene Fitzpatrick
- Manager: Walter Cooley Becker
