= William Dennison Clark =

American football player (1885–1932)

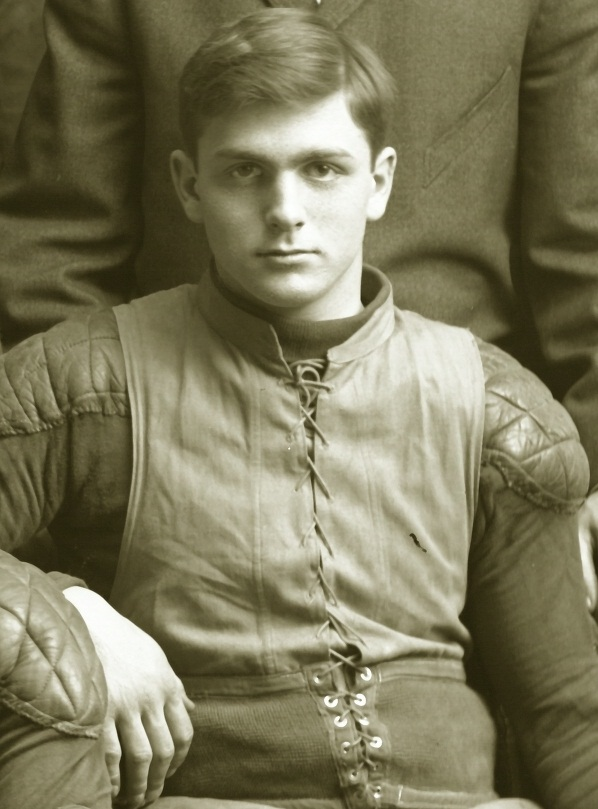

Michigan Wolverines
- Positions: Halfback, fullback, end

Personal information
- Born: October 21, 1885; Detroit, Michigan, U.S.
- Died: May 30, 1932 (aged 46); Salem, Oregon, U.S.

Career information
- College: Michigan (1903–1905)

Awards and highlights
- 2× National champion (1903, 1904)

William Dennison "Denny" Clark (October 21, 1885 – May 30, 1932) was an American football player. He played for the University of Michigan from 1903 to 1905. He was blamed for Michigan's 1905 loss to the University of Chicago, which ended the Wolverines' 56-game unbeaten streak. He committed suicide at a hotel in Salem, Oregon, in 1932.

== Early years and lineage ==
A native of Detroit, Michigan, Clark was the son of the Rev. Rufus Wheelwright Clark (1844–1909), who served for many years as the rector at St. Paul's Episcopal Church in Detroit, and Lucy (Dennison) Clark (1854–1928). His maternal grandfather was William Dennison, Jr. (1815–1882), who served as the 24th governor of Ohio and as U.S. Postmaster General in the Cabinet of President Abraham Lincoln during the American Civil War.

== University of Michigan ==
Clark played football for Fielding H. Yost's "Point-a-Minute" teams at the University of Michigan from 1903 to 1905. Clark was a versatile player who played at the halfback, fullback, and end positions. He was the fourth-leading scorer on the 1904 Michigan team, with 10 touchdowns.

== 1905 Chicago game ==
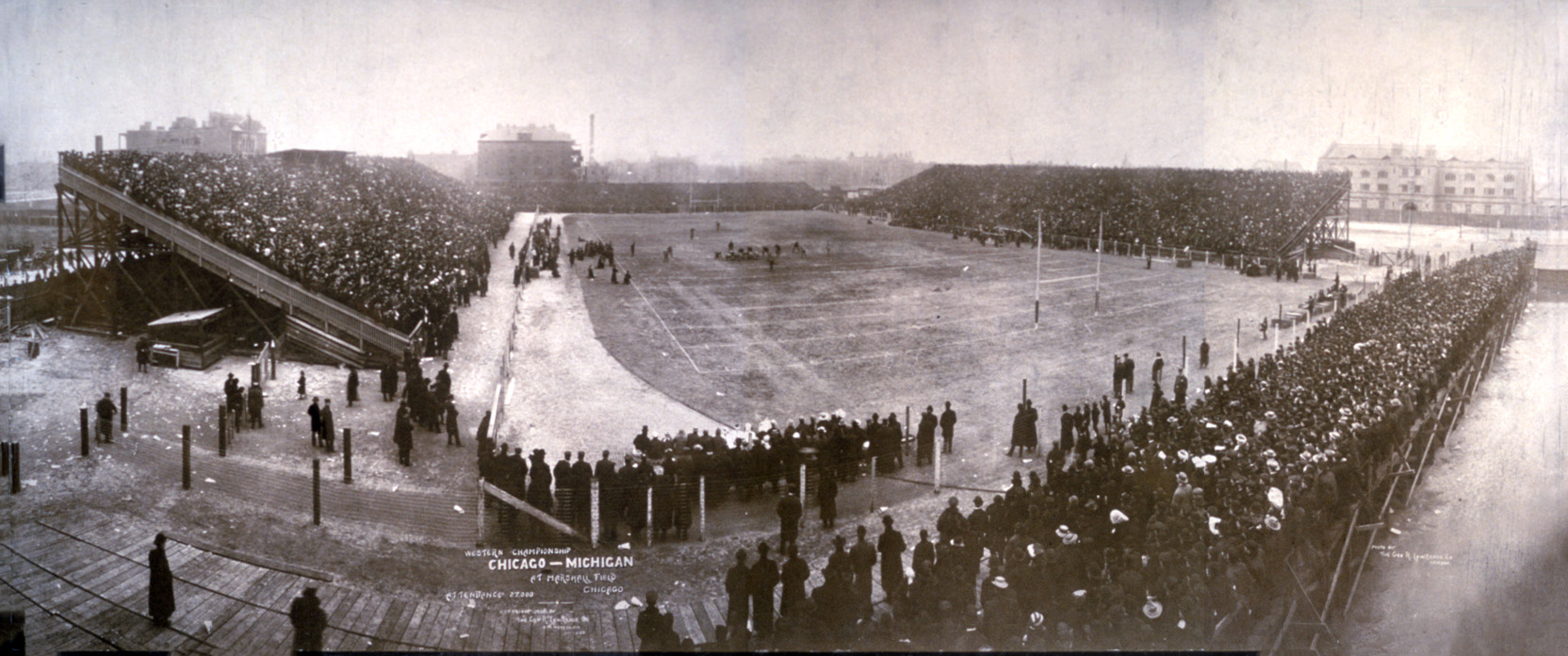
Western Championship Game vs Chicago

In the final game of the 1905 season, Clark was blamed for Michigan's 2–0 loss to the University of Chicago, ending a 56-game unbeaten streak dating back to the first game of the 1901 season. Going into the final game of the season, the Wolverines were unbeaten, untied, and unscored upon. The two teams played to a scoreless tie for more than 50 minutes, when Clark was tackled for a safety as he attempted to return a punt from behind the goal line. The Detroit Free Press described the play as follows:

Eckersall, through failure of his team mates to advance it, was called upon to punt. Chicago at the time was on Michigan's 43-yard line. Barlow and Clark were playing back to take the kick, but the ball, low and well driven, went between them. Clark went behind the line after the ball, with two Chicago players down on him. there was hardly a chance to get away, and he could have played it safe and avoided a score by merely touching the ball down behind the line. He shook off the two tacklers, however, and tried to run the ball back. He was a yard or so over the line on the field when Carlin reached him, and threw him back, forcing him over his own goal line. The result was a safety, two points, and the game, Chicago contenting itself from that time on with kicking out of danger when it could not advance, being satisfied to win by two points, if possible.

After the game, newspapers described Clark's play as "the wretched blunder" and a "lapse of brain work." Clark was reported to have been so despondent after the game that he was reported to have said, "O, this is horrible ... I shall kill myself because I am in disgrace."

However, Clark and his family denied the reports that he was suicidal. Two days after the game, the Detroit Free Press reported:

Denny Clark is alive and well. The plucky little football player, whose error of judgment lost Michigan her five years' prestige on the western gridiron, has not committed suicide, nor has he attempted anything of the sort. He has not lost his reason, and he does not look as though he is in immediate need of medical attention.

Clark told the Free Press: "Everybody has been good to me, telling me it wasn't my fault, and so on. But it was my fault, and I haven't any excuses to make. It was a mistake for me to run out with the ball and I shouldn't have done it. I wish people would blame me. If they were only mad at me, because I lost the game, that would give me a chance to get mad too, and I could relieve my feelings."

On December 8, 1905, 3,500 supporters crowded into University Hall in Ann Arbor to support Michigan's football team. When Clark's name was mentioned, the crowd cheered for three minutes, "showing that Michigan stands by the Detroit lad, and forgives his mistake."

Under modern American football rules a safety would not be scored under these circumstances since a ball carrier is always credited for any forward progression prior to contact with an opponent.

== Legacy as the man "who lost the Michigan - Chicago football game" ==
Clark became known for the rest of his life as "the man 'who lost the Michigan - Chicago football game in 1905." In 1925, Michigan coach Yost wrote an article recounting a recent meeting with Clark, at which Clark constantly recalled his error against Chicago. Yost tried to set Clark at ease and wrote that "only Dennis still feels the pain of it." In 1926, Chicago coach Amos Alonzo Stagg published an article in the Saturday Evening Post claiming that Clark had immediately withdrawn from school after the loss because "conditions at the university became intolerable." Clark reportedly resented Stagg's article as he believed it had impugned both him and the University of Michigan. Clark stated that he went to his home in Detroit after the game, but he returned to the university after the Thanksgiving holiday and remained there until the school year ended in 1906. He then studied at Massachusetts Institute of Technology.

== Later life ==
In November 1908, Clark was appointed manager of Bell Telephone Company in Saginaw, Michigan. He had previously been the company's manager at Hillsdale, Michigan.

During World War I, Clark served as a captain in the United States Army Air Service. Clark married and had three children, Elizabeth, William Dennison, Jr., and Barbara.

== Suicide in 1932 ==
In 1932, Clark committed suicide, shooting himself in a hotel room in Salem, Oregon. He had reportedly been despondent for a period, and hotel attendants reported that Clark "had been drinking considerably before he ended his life." He left an unsent airmail letter to his wife with instructions on his life insurance. Clark also wrote that his decision to end his life was "not cowardice, but the very hardest thing I ever did." He added, "Also I have tried everything else desperately and without success." His suicide note also reportedly expressed hope that his "final play" would atone for his error at Marshall Field in 1905. Clark was age 46 at the time of his suicide. In the year prior to his death, Clark had been living in Los Angeles, California.
