= 1902 All-Western college football team =

American all-star college football team

The 1902 All-Western college football team consists of American football players selected to the All-Western teams chosen by various selectors for the 1902 Western Conference football season.

== All-Western selections ==
=== Ends ===
- Allen Abbott, Wisconsin (CT, CDN, CRH, MEW, MJ-2, W)
- Curtis Redden, Michigan (CDN, MEW, MJ-2)
- Eddie Rogers, Minnesota (CT, MJ-1)
- James F. Cook, Illinois (CRH, MJ-1)
- Frederick A. Speik, Chicago (W)

=== Tackles ===
- Joe Maddock, Michigan (CT, CDN, CRH, MEW, MJ-1, W)
- E. W. Farr, Chicago (CT, CDN, CRH, MJ-2)
- Fred Schacht, Minnesota (MJ-2, W)
- J. M. Davidson, Purdue (MJ-1)
- Jake Stahl, Illinois (MEW)

=== Guards ===
- John G. Flynn, Minnesota (CT, CDN, CRH, MEW, MJ-1, W)
- Dan McGugin, Michigan (CRH, MEW, MJ-2, W) (CFHOF)
- Herbert Ahlswede, Chicago (CT, MJ-2)
- J. Arthur Baird, Northwestern (CDN)
- Arnie Lerum, Wisconsin (MEW, MJ-1)

=== Centers ===
- Shorty Ellsworth, Chicago (CT, CRH, MJ-1)
- Emil Skow, Wisconsin (CDN, MEW, W)
- George W. Gregory, Michigan (MJ-2)

=== Quarterbacks ===
- Boss Weeks, Michigan (CT, CDN, CRH, MEW, MJ-1, W)
- Sigmund Harris, Minnesota (MJ-2)

=== Halfbacks ===
- Willie Heston, Michigan (CT, CDN, CRH, MEW, MJ-1, W) (CFHOF)
- Paul J. Jones, Michigan (CT, W [fullback], MEW [fullback], MJ-2 [fullback])
- Harry J. Van Valkenburg, Minnesota (CRH, MEW, MJ-1)
- Louis J. Salmon, Notre Dame (CDN)
- James M. Sheldon, Chicago (W)
- Albert Herrnstein, Michigan (MEW, MJ-2)
- E. J. Vanderboom, Wisconsin (MJ-2)

=== Fullbacks ===
- Everett Sweeley, Michigan (CT, CDN, CRH)
- Warren Cummings Knowlton, Minnesota (MJ-1)

== Key ==
CT = Chicago Tribune

CDN = Chicago Daily News selected by Fred Hayner

CRH = Chicago Record-Herald selected by Carl M. Green

MEW = Milwaukee Evening Wisconsin

MJ = The Minneapolis Journal

W = Woodruff

CFHOF = College Football Hall of Fame

== See also ==
- 1902 College Football All-America Team
