= Curtis Redden =

American football player and coach (1881–1919)

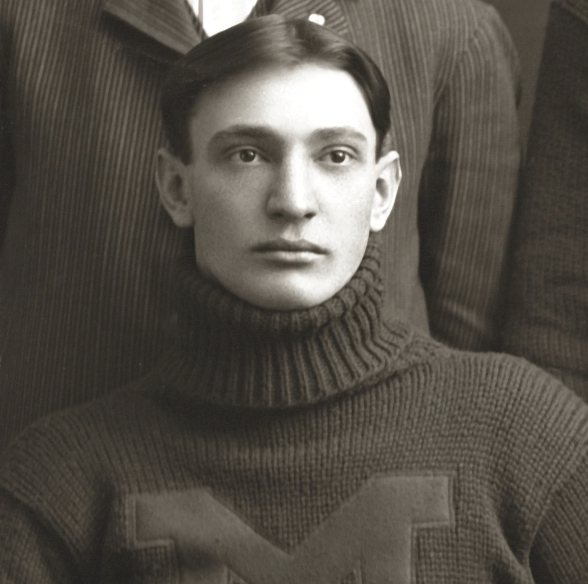

Biographical details
- Born: February 8, 1881; Danville, Illinois, U.S.
- Died: January 16, 1919 (aged 37); Koblenz, Germany

Playing career
- 1900–1903: Michigan
- Position: End

Coaching career (HC unless noted)
- 1905: Kentucky University

Head coaching record
- Overall: 7–0–3

Accomplishments and honors

Championships
- 3× National (1901, 1902, 1903)

Awards
- Third-team All-American (1903); 2× First-team All-Western (1902, 1903)

Curtis Gerald "Cap" Redden (February 8, 1881 – January 16, 1919) was an American college football player and coach. He was the starting left end for the University of Michigan's football team from 1901 to 1904. He played for Michigan's "Point-a-Minute" teams and was unanimously selected as an All-Western player in 1903. Redden died of pneumonia while serving in the United States Army in Germany at the end of World War I.

== Early years ==
Redden was born in Danville, Illinois. His father, William B. Redden, was an Indiana native and a lawyer. His mother, Sarah E. Redden, was also an Indiana native. Redden had two younger brothers, Forest and James, and a younger sister, Jessie. At the time of the 1900 United States census, Redden was living in Rossville, Illinois, with his parents and siblings.

== University of Michigan ==
Redden enrolled at the University of Michigan where he became one of the stars of Fielding H. Yost's famous "Point-a-Minute" teams of 1901, 1902, and 1903. The 1901 team compiled a record of 11–0 and outscored its opponents 550–0. In Redden's sophomore, junior and senior years, Michigan was 33–0–1 and outscored opponents by a total of 1,764 to 18. At the end of his senior season, Redden was a unanimous first-team All-Western selection, including designations by the Chicago Record-Herald, The Chicago Daily News, and The Inter-Ocean. He was one of only five players upon whom the "Western football critics have been able to unanimously agree." The Chicago Daily News also designated Redden as the captain of its 1903 All-Western team and explained its choice as follows

Redden's cool head in a game, his speed and strong playing mark him as the most legitimate selection for captain among all the other captains ... Redden's speed up the field on punts, his ability to stiff arm every interferer without slackening up that speed, and his open-field tackling mark him as the best end for the pure type of end work the west has seen in years. Offensively his skill lies in assisting his tackle in boxing an opponent and assisting the runner after he has passed the line.

Redden was also selected as a third-team All-American by Walter Camp. After he graduated, one paper noted the impact his loss would have on the 1904 team: "The loss of Captain Redden will be felt keenly. For four years he was regarded as the greatest end the west ever produced."

An all-around athlete, Redden was selected as the captain of Michigan's football and baseball teams in his senior year. One newspaper summed up Redden's athletic career at Michigan as follows

Redden was captain not only of this year's Michigan football team but also of the selected All-Star Western team. He is a natural football player and is one of the best ends the Middle West has ever produced. He is also captain of the school track team, being the only man who has had the distinction of holding both stations of honor at the same time.

== Football coach and lawyer ==
With the success of Yost's "Point-a-Minute" teams, his former players were in great demand as coaches. Dan McGugin went to Vanderbilt, Willie Heston to Drake, Albert E. Herrnstein to Purdue and Ohio State, Paul J. Jones to Western Reserve, Bruce Shorts to Nevada and Oregon, William Cole to Virginia, Frank Longman to Arkansas and Notre Dame, Joseph Maddock to Oregon and Utah and Fred Norcross to Oregon State. And in 1905, Redden was hired as the football coach at Kentucky University. In November 1905, a newspaper reported on Redden's progress at Kentucky: "What Redden is doing at Kentucky is best shown by the record his moonshiners made in this Northwestern game. Undoubtedly, the close, hard game given the purple bv Redden's pupils, helped pull Northwestern down to the weakened condition in which Stagg's men found McCormick's players."

In 1906, Redden, who had also been a star in baseball at Michigan, signed to play baseball with the Indianapolis Indians in the American Association.

By 1908, Redden had opened a law practice in his home town of Danville, Illinois, where he also became involved in politics. In October 1908, Redden agreed to take time out from his law practice to join Coach Yost's staff to whip the Michigan football team into shape. Redden was given responsibility over the linemen. For a portion of the 1911 season, Yost left Redden in charge of the team while Yost traveled to the East to watch Penn play Jim Thorpe's Carlisle Indians. Redden remained on Yost's coaching staff through the 1912 season. For several years, Redden had continued his law practice in Illinois but had "been able to spare a few weeks to return to Ann Arbor and help out" as Yost's assistant. By 1912, Yost concluded he needed a year-round, full-time staff of assistants. Redden returned to Illinois, where he worked at Knox College in Galesburg, Illinois, from 1915 to 1917 as an assistant physical education director, line coach for the Knox football team, and as head baseball coach.

== World War I ==
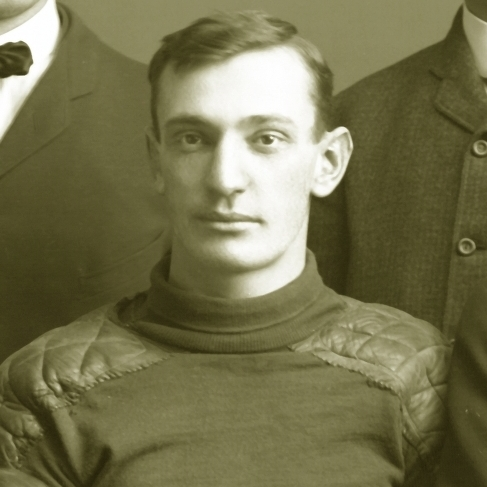
Curtis Redden cropped from 1903 Michigan football team photograph

Redden enlisted in the U.S. Army during World War I. He served as a lieutenant colonel of the 149th Field Artillery with the Rainbow Division in France. His unit was among the first to leave for France. In April 1918, newspapers published a letter from Redden to a friend back home describing the Illinois artillery unit's "baptism of fire." He described the heavy shelling the unit withstood:

And so it went from day to day, but oftimes the nights were very bad. At night, when the infantry launched its raids, or the enemy his, or the infantry became nervous and called for help, the guns stamped like stallions and snorted their breaths of fire. The blackness of the night became a series of dots and dashes, until the world resembled a vast radio station, spelling hell, hell, and hell again. To this must be added the shriek of shells, the whistle of fragments, the automatic hammer effect of the machine gun, the rattle of the rifle fire, the rockets and star shells out over No Man's land—all combined to make the night weird, hideous, fascinating, sublime.

In November 1918, Redden was promoted to the rank of lieutenant colonel and assumed command of the 149th Field Artillery Regiment.

Redden survived the many battles in which his unit fought only to come down with pneumonia after the army of occupation began its march into Germany. Redden died of pneumonia in January 1919 at a hospital in Koblenz, Germany. Redden had been in command of the artillery unit since October 1918. Redden was buried in Germany on a slope near the point where the Rhine and Moselle Rivers meet. Newspapers described his funeral as follows

With an escort of more than 600 enlisted men besides the officers of the 149th and 67th artillery brigade, of which the regiment was a part, the cortege passed through Coblenz with Redden's horse, 'Sergeant,' taking the place of honor immediately behind the gun carriage bearing the flag-draped casket. In line with the custom of military funerals, the dead officer's boots were in the stirrups, with the toes pointing to the rear. At the grave three volleys were fired by an infantry squad and a bugler sounded the plantive notes of 'taps.'

Redden has since been reburied in Spring Hill Cemetery in Danville, Vermilion County, Illinois, US.

In 1921, one of the columns in Memorial Stadium at the University of Illinois was dedicated to Redden. The funds to purchase the column were donated by friends of Redden from his days at Michigan and by the men who served with him in the 149th Field Artillery. The column was dedicated at a ceremony prior the 1921 Michigan-Illinois game. The Michigan Alumnus magazine in November 1921 reported: "This column will stand for all time to perpetuate the memory of Colonel Redden and as a bond of union between the two great universities."

== Head coaching record ==
Year	Team	Overall	Conference	Standing	Bowl/playoffs
Kentucky University (Independent) (1905)
1905	Kentucky University	7–0–3			
Kentucky University:		7–0–3			
Total:		7–0–3			

== See also ==
- Michigan Wolverines Football All-Americans
