= 1903 All-Western college football team =

American all-star college football team

The 1903 All-Western college football team consists of American football players selected to the All-Western teams chosen by various selectors for the 1903 Western Conference football season.

== All-Western selections ==
=== Ends ===
- Curtis Redden, Michigan (BMA, BM-2, CIO-1, CRH, CT, FL-1, MJ-1, WC)
- Allen Abbott, Wisconsin (BMA, BM-1, CIO-1, CRH, CT, FL-2)
- Eddie Rogers, Minnesota (BMA, BM-1, CIO-2, FL-1, MJ-1, WC)
- James Irving Bush, Wisconsin (BM-2, MJ-2)
- Frank Longman, Michigan (MJ-2)
- Frederick A. Speik, Chicago (CIO-2, FL-2)

=== Tackles ===
- Joe Maddock, Michigan (BMA, BM-1, CIO-1, CRH, CT, FL-1, MJ-1, WC)
- Fred Schacht, Minnesota (BMA, BM-1, CIO-1, CRH, CT, FL-1, MJ-1, WC)
- Joe Curtis, Michigan (CIO-2, FL-2, MJ-2)
- Harry I. Allen, Northwestern (BM-2, MJ-2)
- Tiny Maxwell, Chicago (CIO-2)
- Thomas S. Hammond, Michigan (BM-2)
- Henry H. Kafir, Northwestern (FL-2)

=== Guards ===
- Robert Philips, Northwestern (BMA, CIO-1, CRH, FL-2, WC)
- Wilson Berthke, Wisconsin (BMA, BM-1, CIO-2, FL-1, MJ-1, WC)
- Walton Willard Thorp, Minnesota (BM-1, CIO-2, CT, MJ-1)
- Claude Rothgeb, Illinois (BMA, CIO-1, FL-1, MJ-2)
- Henry Schulte, Michigan (CT)
- Charles A. Fairweather, Illinois (CRH, FL-2)
- John B. Warren, Minnesota (BM-2, MJ-2)
- Pat Beacom, Notre Dame (BM-2)

=== Centers ===
- Moses Land Strathern, Minnesota (BMA, BM-1, CIO-1, CRH, FL-1, MJ-1, WC)
- George W. Gregory, Michigan (BM-2, CIO-2, CT, FL-2, MJ-2)

=== Quarterbacks ===
- Walter Eckersall, Chicago (BMA, BM-2, CIO-1, CT, FL-2, MJ-1) (CFH0F)
- Sigmund Harris, Minnesota (BM-1, CIO-2, CRH, FL-1, MJ-2, WC)

=== Halfbacks ===
- Willie Heston, Michigan (BMA, BM-1, CIO-1, CRH, CT, FL-1 [fullback], MJ-1, WC) (CFHOF)
- James B. Irsfield, Minnesota (BMA, CIO-2, CT, FL-1, MJ-2, WC)
- E. J. Vanderboom, Wisconsin (BM-1, FL-2, MJ-1)
- George Edward Schnur, Chicago (CIO-1, FL-1)
- Herb Graver, Michigan (CRH)
- Walter G. Diener, Illinois (BM-2, MJ-2)
- Zora Clevenger, Indiana (CIO-2) (CFHOF)
- Otto Nelson Davies, Minnesota (BM-2)

=== Fullbacks ===
- Louis J. Salmon, Notre Dame (BMA, BM-1, CIO-1, CT, MJ-1, WC) (CFHOF)
- Mark Catlin Sr., Chicago (CIO-2, CRH, FL-2 [halfback], MJ-2)
- Earl Current, Minnesota (BM-2)
- Chauncey Colton, Northwestern (FL-2)

== Key ==
BMA = Billy Mac, a team selected by aggregating the choices made by ten critics in St. Paul, Minneapolis, Milwaukee, Chicago and Detroit

BM = Billy Mac in The St. Paul Globe

CIO = Chicago Inter-Ocean

CRH = Chicago Record-Herald

CT = Chicago Tribune

FL = Fred Lowenthal, former star football player at University of Illinois

MJ = The Minneapolis Journal

WC = Walter Camp

CFHOF = College Football Hall of Fame

== See also ==
- 1903 College Football All-America Team
