= 1902 Michigan Wolverines football team =

American college football season

1902 Michigan Wolverines football
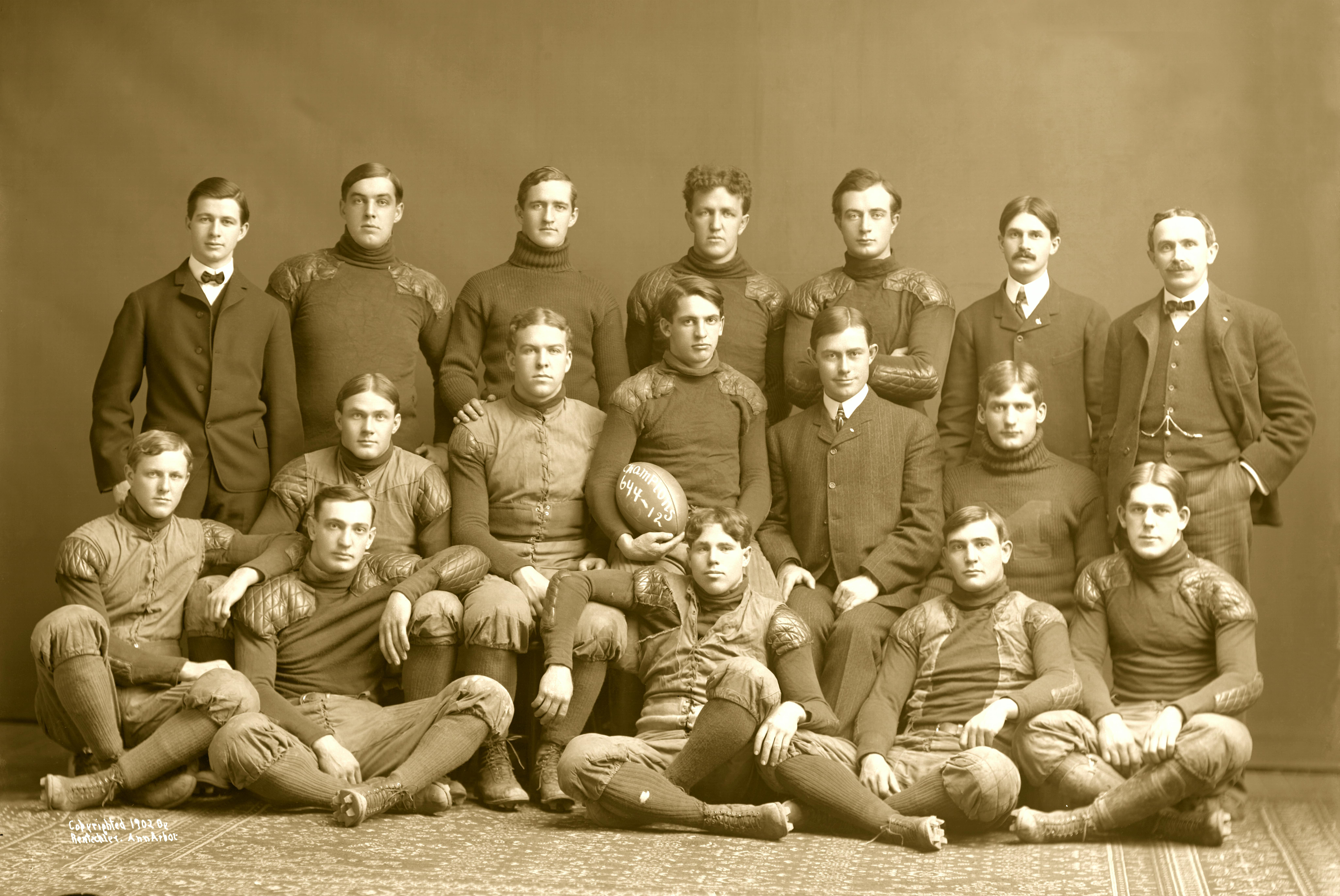

National champion (Billingsley, Helms, Houlgate, NCF) Co-national champion (Davis) Western Conference champion
- Conference: Western Conference
- Record: 11–0 (5–0 Western)
- Head coach: Fielding H. Yost (2nd season)
- Offensive scheme: Short punt
- Captain: Boss Weeks
- Home stadium: Regents Field

1902 Western Conference football standings
	Conf.					Overall
Team	W		L		T	W		L		T
Michigan $	5	–	0	–	0	11	–	0	–	0
Chicago	5	–	1	–	0	11	–	1	–	0
Minnesota	3	–	1	–	0	9	–	2	–	1
Illinois	4	–	2	–	0	10	–	2	–	1
Purdue	2	–	2	–	0	7	–	2	–	1
Wisconsin	1	–	3	–	0	6	–	3	–	0
Iowa	0	–	3	–	0	5	–	4	–	0
Northwestern	0	–	4	–	0	6	–	6	–	0
Indiana	0	–	4	–	0	3	–	5	–	1
$ – Conference champion

The 1902 Michigan Wolverines football team represented the University of Michigan in the 1902 Western Conference football season. In their second year under head coach Fielding H. Yost, Michigan finished the season undefeated with an 11–0 record, outscored their opponents by a combined score of 644 to 12, and became known as the second of Yost's famed "Point-a-Minute" teams. With a conference record of 5–0, Michigan won the Big Nine Conference championship. The 1902 Michigan Wolverines have also been recognized as the national champions by the Billingsley Report, Helms Athletic Foundation, Houlgate System, and National Championship Foundation, and as co-national champions by Parke H. Davis.

Quarterback Boss Weeks was the team's captain and the leader of the Wolverines' offense that twice scored more than 100 points against opponents and averaged 58.5 points per game. Right halfback Albert E. Herrnstein was the team's leading scorer with 135 points on 27 touchdowns (valued at five points under 1902 rules). Fullback James E. Lawrence was the second-leading scorer with 113 points on 12 touchdowns and 53 extra point kicks (then known as "goals from touchdown"). Willie Heston, Joe Maddock and Paul J. Jones added 15, 12 and 11 touchdowns, respectively.

== Schedule ==
Date	Time	Opponent	Site	Result	Attendance
September 27		Albion*	Regents Field; Ann Arbor, MI	W 88–0	2,000
October 4		Case*	Regents Field; Ann Arbor, MI	W 48–6	
October 8		Michigan Agricultural*	Regents Field; Ann Arbor, MI (rivalry)	W 119–0	
October 11		Indiana	Regents Field; Ann Arbor, MI	W 60–0	
October 18		vs. Notre Dame*	Armory Park; Toledo, OH (rivalry)	W 23–0	1,700
October 25		Ohio State*	Regents Field; Ann Arbor, MI (rivalry)	W 86–0	6,000
November 1	2:40 p.m.	vs. Wisconsin	Marshall Field; Chicago, IL	W 6–0	20,000
November 8		Iowa	Regents Field; Ann Arbor, MI	W 107–0	3,000
November 15	2:15 p.m.	at Chicago	Marshall Field; Chicago, IL (rivalry)	W 21–0	14,000
November 22		Oberlin*	Regents Field; Ann Arbor, MI	W 63–0	
November 27	2:15 p.m.	Minnesota^{†}	Regents Field; Ann Arbor, MI (rivalry)	W 23–6	9,000
*Non-conference game; ^{†}Homecoming; All times are in Eastern time

== Game summaries ==
=== Michigan 88, Albion 0 ===
Albion at Michigan

Team	1	2	Total
Albion	0	0	0
• Michigan	45	43	88

- Date: September 27
- Location: Regents Field • Ann Arbor, MI
- Game attendance: 2,000

Michigan opened the 1902 season with an 88–0 victory the Albion Methodists. Michigan completed all but one drive with touchdowns. The Wolverines starters scored eight touchdowns and 45 points in the first 20-minute half, and the substitutes added seven touchdowns and a safety in the second half. On defense, Michigan allowed only a single first down by Albion.

The game was played in halves of 20 minutes each. Rinehart of Lafayette was the umpire, and Thomas of Michigan was the referee. Michigan's starting lineup was Redden (left end), Johnson (left tackle), Baker (left guard), Gregory (center), Lawrence (right guard), Maddock (right tackle), Cole (right end), Weeks (quarterback), Heston (left halfback), Herrnstein (right halfback) and Jones (fullback).

=== Michigan 48, Case 6 ===
Case at Michigan

Team	1	2	Total
Case	6	0	6
• Michigan	30	18	48

- Date: October 4
- Location: Regents Field • Ann Arbor, MI

In its second game of the 1902, Michigan played the Case Scientific School (later Case Western Reserve University) of Cleveland. The October 4 game was the fifth meeting between the schools. Although Michigan scored eight touchdowns and easily defeated Case by a score of 48 to 6, the big story of the game was a 30-yard touchdown run by Case's left halfback, Davidson. Michigan had not allowed any points to be scored in the first 12 games under Fielding Yost. The headline in the Detroit Free Press referred not to Michigan's victory but instead read, "MICHIGAN'S GOAL LINE CROSSED." The Michigan Alumnus wrote that the touchdown by Case "caused consternation among coach, team, and students" as "it had been their fondest hope that the goal line should remain uncrossed another year."

The game was played in halves of 20 minutes each. Rinehart of Lafayette was the umpire, and Gaston of Cleveland was the referee. Michigan's starting lineup was Redden (left end), Lawrence (left tackle), McGugin (left guard), Gregory (center), Carter (right guard), Maddock (right tackle), Cole (right end), Weeks (quarterback), Kidston (left halfback), Herrnstein (right halfback) and Jones (fullback).

=== Michigan 119, Michigan Agricultural 0 ===
Michigan Agricultural at Michigan

Team	1	2	Total
Michigan Aggies	0	0	0
• Michigan	71	48	119

- Date: October 8
- Location: Regents Field • Ann Arbor, MI

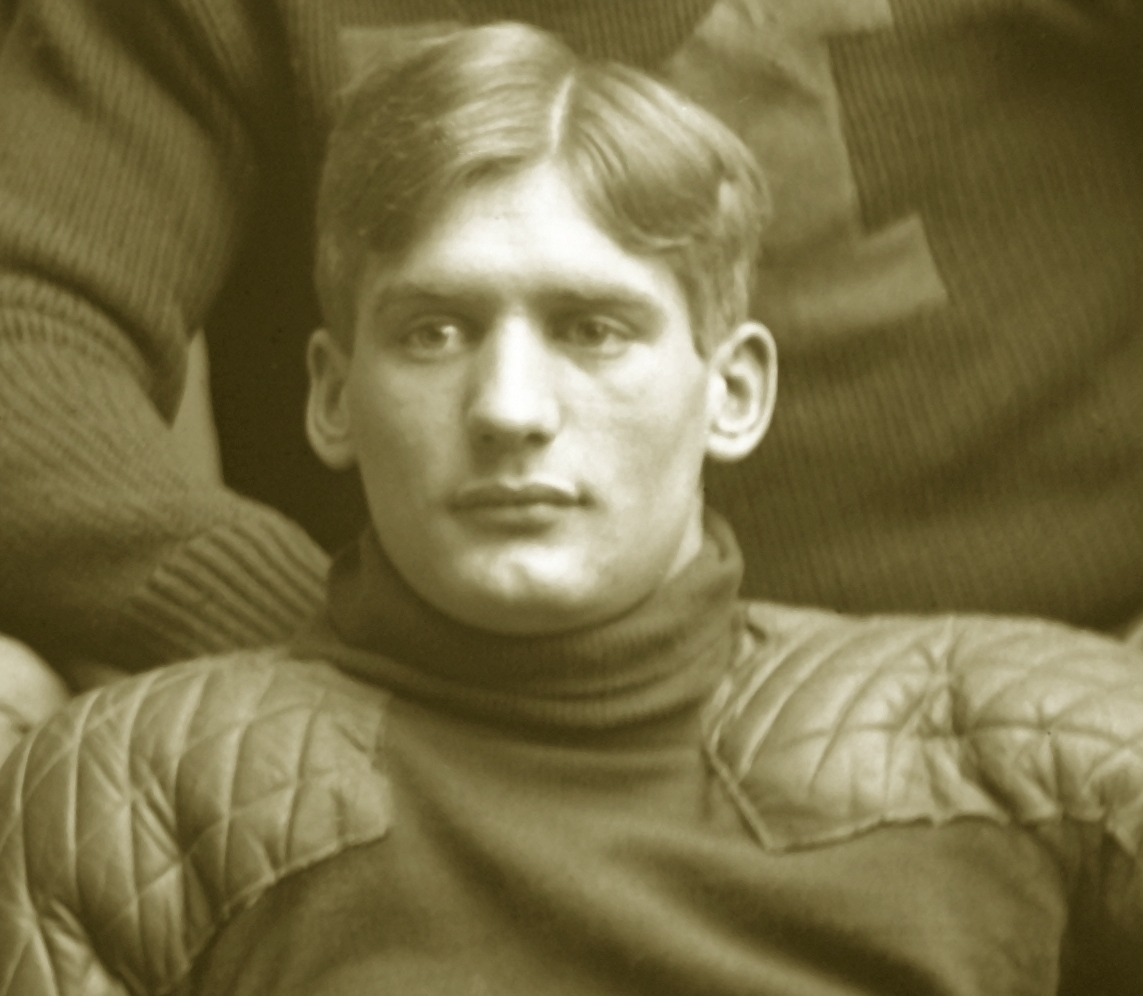
Albert E. Herrnstein led all Michigan scorers with 27 touchdowns, including seven against Michigan Agricultural College.

Michigan played a mid-week game against Michigan Agricultural College (now known as Michigan State University) on Wednesday, October 8, 1902, four days after the win against Case. Michigan attained its highest point total of the year, defeating the Aggies by a score of 119-0. The Wolverines scored 71 points in the first half of 20 minutes and 48 in the second half of 18 minutes. The Michigan Alumnus called it "the greatest fusillade of touchdowns ever known to the football world," excluding Michigan's 128–0 win over Buffalo in 1901. Michigan was held on downs only once in the game, and the Aggies made only three first downs. Right halfback Albert Herrnstein ran back a kickoff the length of the field and scored seven touchdowns in the game. Willie Heston and Everett Sweeley did not play in the game, and the Detroit Free Press noted: "The opinion is quite general that if Heston and Sweeley had been in the game the Buffalo record would have been beaten, but, as it was, Michigan was simply fagged out running down the field for touchdowns."

The game was played in two halves of 20 minutes and 18 minutes. Demonstrating the understatement of the "Point-a-Minute" name given to the team, the Wolverines scored 119 points in 38 minutes of play, an average of 3.1 points per minute. After the game, The Newark Advocate wrote:

"Michigan has undoubtedly the fastest scoring team in the world, and the Ann Arbor boys play Yosts' 'hurry up' formations like clock work. It requires a fast team to take the ball, line up and score 119 points, even if they have no opponents in two 20 minute halves."

Michigan's starting lineup was Redden (left end), Lawrence (left tackle), McGugin (left guard), Gregory (center), Carter (right guard), Maddock (right tackle), Cole (right end), Weeks (quarterback), Kidston (left halfback), Herrnstein (right halfback) and Jones (fullback). Richardson of Michigan was the umpire, and Thomas of Michigan was the referee.

=== Michigan 60, Indiana 0 ===
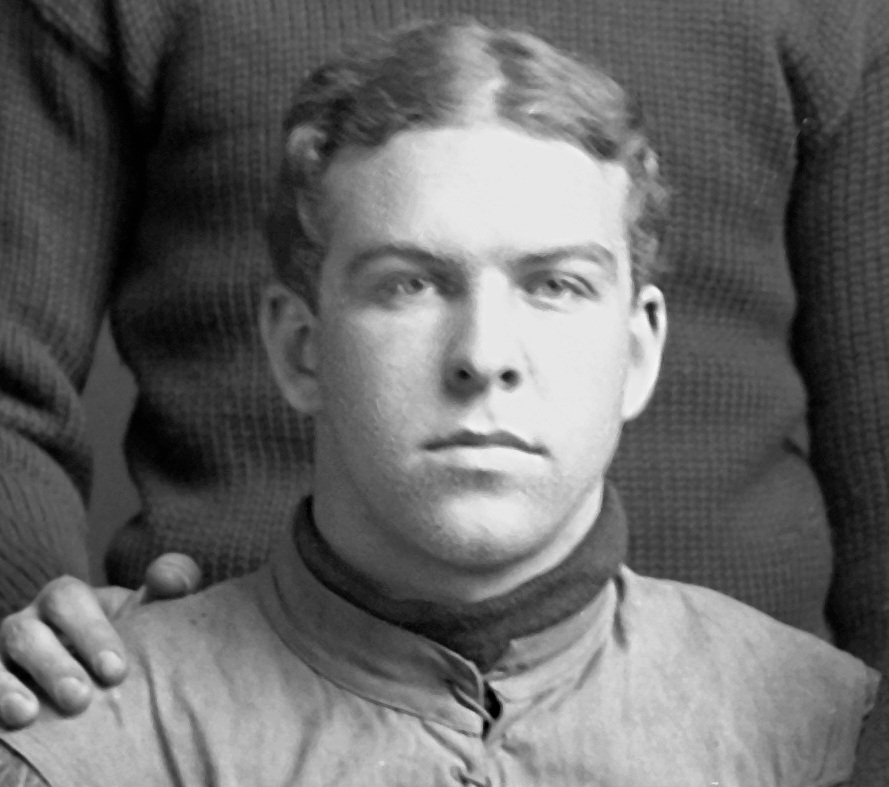
Michigan's second-leading scorer James Lawrence kicked 19 goals from touchdown against Michigan Agricultural and scored four touchdowns against Indiana.

Michigan defeated Indiana 60-0 in the fourth game of the season. The Indiana team was led by future College Football Hall of Famer Zora Clevenger.

James Lawrence was the star of the game for Michigan. In his first game after Fielding Yost moved him to the fullback position, Lawrence scored four touchdowns and kicked nine goals after touchdown, accounting for 29 of Michigan's 60 points. The Michigan Alumnus wrote that Lawrence "was called upon repeatedly to take the ball and would always advance it eight or ten yards" with big holes being opened by guards Carter and McGugin. Michigan's "most spectacular play" of the game was a 75-yard touchdown run by Maddock. The Alumnus gave particular praise to the defense: "Only once was Indiana able to make an impression on her impregnable wall and that on a very short run by Clevenger."

At the invitation of Michigan's graduate manager Charles A. Baird, more than 2,000 school children accompanied by their teachers attended the game. University of Michigan president James B. Angell also attended the game for the first time of the year. Wisconsin Badgers football coach Phil King also attended the game with his fullback Earl "Keg" Driver to scout the Michigan team in preparation for the upcoming game between the two teams.

The game was played in halves of 25 and 20 minutes. Through the first four games of the season, Yost's "Point-a-Minute" team had scored 315 points in 163 minutes of play, an average of almost two points per minute.

Michigan's starting lineup was Graver (left end), Baker (left tackle), McGugin (left guard), Gregory (center), Carter (right guard), Maddock (right tackle), Cole (right end), Weeks (quarterback), Heston (left halfback), Herrnstein (right halfback) and Lawrence (fullback).

Player	Position	Starter	Touchdowns	Extra points	Field goals	Points
James Lawrence	Fullback	Yes	4	9	0	29
Willie Heston	Halfback	Yes	2	0	0	10
Joe Maddock	Tackle	Yes	2	0	0	10
Herb Graver	End	Yes	2	0	0	10
Albert Herrnstein	Halfback	Yes	0	1	0	1
Total	--	--	10	10	0	60

=== Michigan 23, Notre Dame 0 ===
Michigan vs Notre Dame

Team	1	2	Total
• Michigan	5	18	23
Notre Dame	0	0	0

- Date: October 18
- Location: Armory Park • Toledo, OH

After four home games to open the season, Michigan played Notre Dame at a neutral site in Toledo, Ohio on October 18, 1902. The game was played on a slippery white clay field at Armory Park following a night of rain. Michigan had been heavily favored to win, and betting on the game was 2 to 1 that Notre Dame would not score. Though favored to run up a high score, Michigan scored only one touchdown and led 5-0 at the end of the first half. The Detroit Free Press wrote that the game was "the toughest proposition that the Wolverines have had, either this season or last year."

Michigan tackle Joe Maddock was the leading scorer with three touchdowns. The game also marked the debut of right end Everett Sweeley, who punted several times for a distance of 60 yards. On the opening kickoff, Sweeley returned the ball with a punt to Notre Dame's 43-yard line.

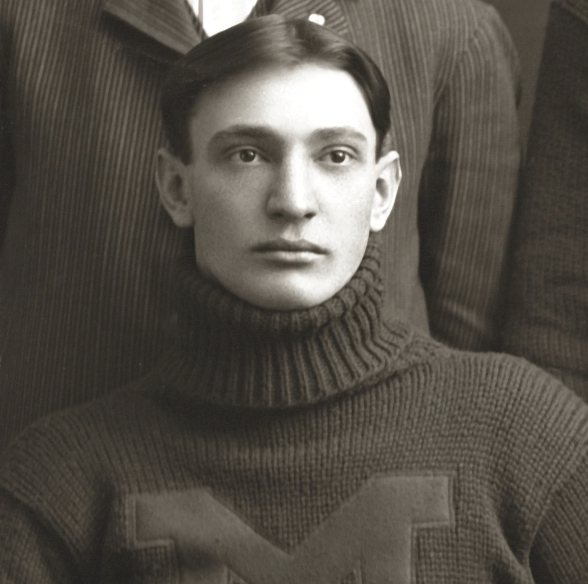
Curtis Redden, ejected from the Notre Dame game, died from pneumonia during World War I 16 years later.

Although Notre Dame did not score on Michigan, its captain, Louis J. Salmon, demonstrated why he had earned "the reputation of being the hardest line bucker in the west." On one drive, Salmon took the ball to the Michigan 43-yard line in two attempts. After Notre Dame reached Michigan's 20-yard line, "Salmon went at it in the most vicious and determined manner to score. He took the ball eight times in succession but was finally held for downs on the 5-yard line."

In the second half, Michigan's running game wore down the Notre Dame defense. Michigan scored three touchdown in the second half, and Notre Dame did not move into Michigan territory. Michigan end Curtis Redden was ejected from the game after an altercation with Lonnegan of Notre Dame, though Redden claimed Lonnegan had been the instigator. After the game, Yost said, "I am satisfied. The score is just about what I thought it would be after I had taken a look at the field."

The game was played in halves of 25 minutes. Hinkey of Yale was the umpire, and Jackson of Lake Forest was the referee. Michigan's starting lineup was Redden (left end), Cole (left tackle), McGugin (left guard), Gregory (center), Carter (right guard), Maddock (right tackle), Sweeley (right end), Graver (quarterback), Heston (left halfback), Herrnstein (right halfback) and Jones (fullback).

=== Michigan 86, Ohio State 0 ===
Ohio State at Michigan

Team	1	2	Total
Ohio St.	0	0	0
• Michigan	45	41	86

- Date: October 25
- Location: Regents Field • Ann Arbor, MI

In the sixth game of the season, Michigan defeated Ohio State 86–0 in Ann Arbor on October 25, 1902. The game was played in front of a crowd of 6,000 (including 2,000 from Columbus), "the largest crowd ever gathered at Ferry Field." Michigan scored 45 points in the first half and 41 points in the second half.

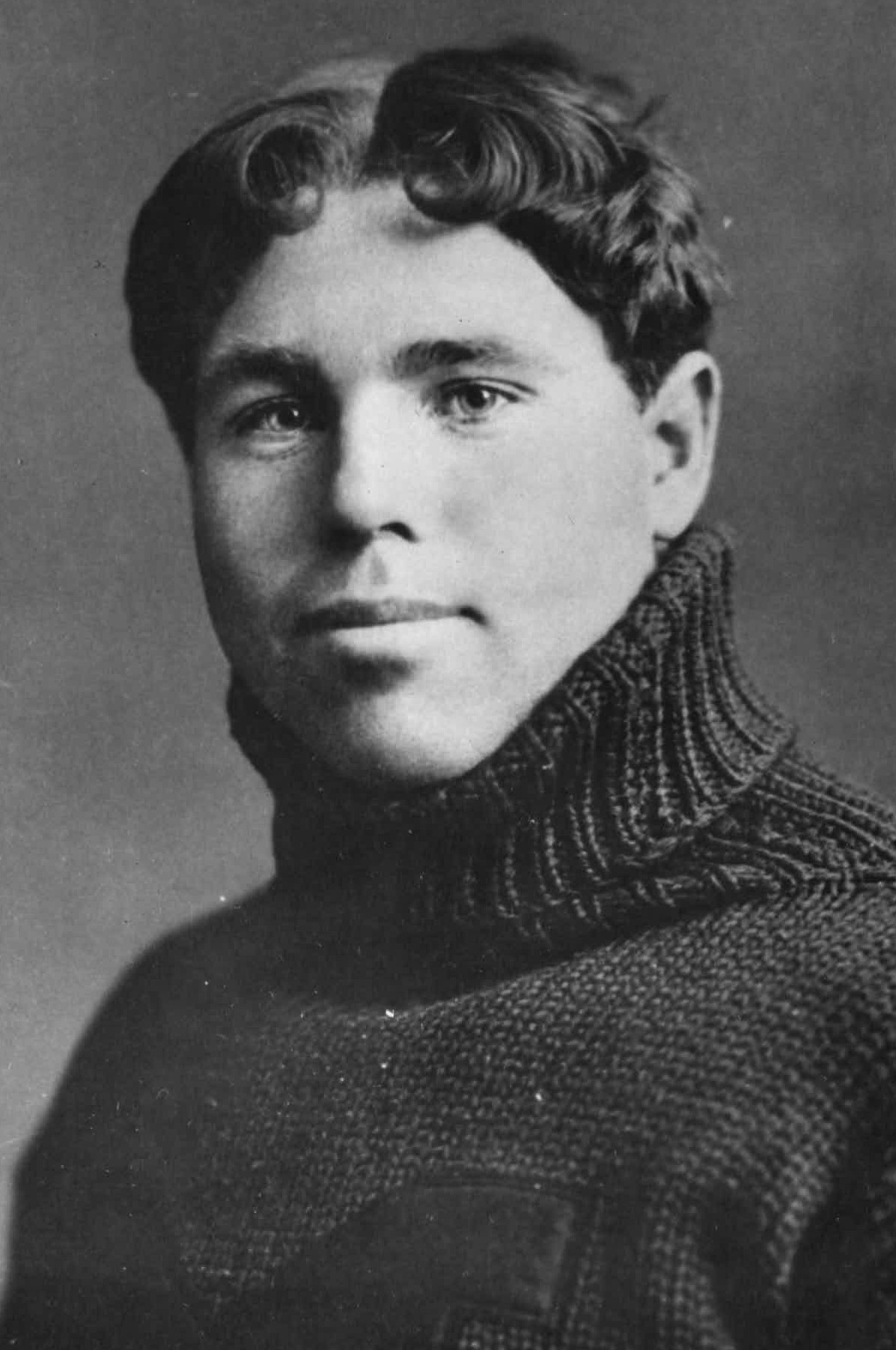
Willie Heston returned to "his 1901 form" against Ohio State, scoring two touchdowns, including a 70-yard run.

On offense, the Detroit Free Press wrote that the Wolverines "simply ran the Ohio team off their feet." Willie Heston reportedly returned to "his 1901 form," scoring the game's first points with a 20-yard end run after three minutes of play. Heston scored his second touchdown on a 70-yard run. Albert Herrnstein was credited by the Free Press with the most consistent play for Michigan and with "the star play of the day by cutting inside of end and running 35 yards for a touchdown." The Free Press noted that, despite the coaching of former Yale fullback Perry Hale, the Ohio State players lacked "the first rudiments of tackling" and "failed to hold a man when they got their arms around him."

Michigan's defense was credited with playing a strong game as "Ohio State never got near enough to Michigan's goal line to see what the cross-bars looked like." Ohio State's longest gain was a 15-yard run around Michigan's right end for a 15-yard gain in the second half. Everett Sweeley made the tackle to stop a touchdown. Herb Graver also blocked a punt for Michigan.

The game was played in halves of 35 and 25 minutes. Hinkey of Yale was the umpire, and Hoagland of Princeton was the referee. Michigan's starting lineup was Redden (left end), Palmer (left tackle), McGugin (left guard), Gregory (center), Carter (right guard), Maddock (right tackle), Sweeley (right end), Weeks (quarterback), Heston (left halfback), Herrnstein (right halfback) and Lawrence (fullback).

=== Michigan 6, Wisconsin 0 ===
Michigan vs Wisconsin

Team	1	2	Total
• Michigan	6	0	6
Wisconsin	0	0	0

- Date: November 1
- Location: Marshall Field • Chicago, IL
- Game start: 2:40 p. m.
- Game attendance: 22,000

In the seventh game of the season, Michigan faced its toughest opponent, the Wisconsin Badgers. The game matched the two western teams that had finished the 1901 season with undefeated records and was played at Marshall Field in Chicago in front of a crowd estimated variously at between 20,000 and 22,000, the largest number ever to watch a college football game in the west.

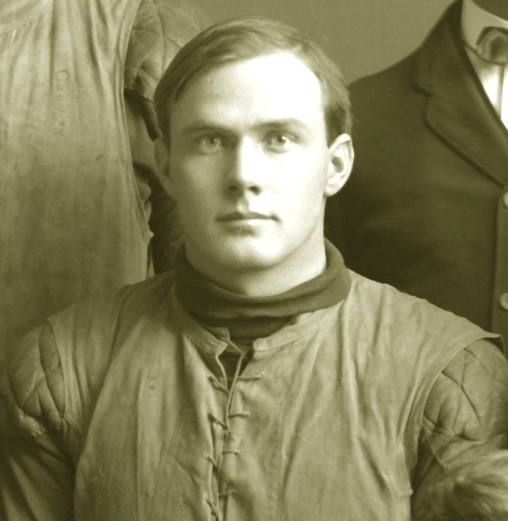
Joe Maddock scored the only touchdown against Wisconsin and later became the head football coach at Utah.

Michigan scored the game's only points at the end of a 65-yard drive seven minutes into the first half. Willie Heston had the longest run (20 yards) on the drive, and Joe Maddock scored the touchdown on a run through the tackle from the two-yard line. Despite the close score, Wisconsin only once had the ball in Michigan's territory. The Michigan Alumnus wrote:

"The play was in Wisconsin's territory practically the whole time. They never got within striking distance of Michigan's goal, while Michigan was held at one time with the ball less than a yard from Wisconsin's goal line, at another time was held inside the 15-yard line, and still again lost the ball on a fumble on the 7-yard line."

The Detroit Free Press opened its coverage of the game as follows: "In what is conceded to be the greatest football game ever played on a western gridiron, Michigan decisively defeated Wisconsin on Marshall field this afternoon and undoubtedly won at the same time the championship of the west, though a later game must be won before that honor can be claimed." Four times Michigan moved the ball deep into Wisconsin territory, and all four times Michigan's field goal attempts by Lawrence and Sweeley were unsuccessful.

In the middle of the first half, a temporary bleacher at the northeast corner of the field collapsed, "carrying with it a mass of struggling people." Several hundred people were thrown to the ground in the accident. The Detroit Free Press described the scene following the collapse: "A shudder went through the grand stands, and the game was stopped. A score of men were injured, but no one were killed. The immense crowd about the gridiron took advantage of the confusion to break down the wire fence surrounding it, and hundreds swarmed onto the field. The few police were powerless to force them out, but the scrubs from both teams lined up against the crowd and shoved them away from the side lines so the game could be played." The game was resumed after a 15-minute delay.

The inadequate seating capacity of Marshall Field was blamed for the accident. The bleacher was designed to hold 400 but was crowded beyond its capacity. The facilities were insufficient for the crowd that showed for the game, and there were reports of spectators offering $20 for a ticket.

The game was played in equal halves of 35 minutes. Michigan's starting lineup was Redden (left end), Palmer (left tackle), McGugin (left guard), Gregory (center), Carter (right guard), Maddock (right tackle), Sweeley (right end), Weeks (quarterback), Heston (left halfback), Herrnstein (right halfback) and Jones (fullback).

Approximately 2,000 students accompanied the team to Chicago, and an account from Chicago was relayed to Ann Arbor's Athens theater which was "packed with students and citizens." When the final score was announced, the crowd of 1,500 voices sung, "Oh! What have we done? Oh! What have we done? We have put Wisconsin on the bum. That's what we have done." When the Michigan team returned to Ann Arbor late in the evening, they were met by a big delegation that marched behind the bus singing."

=== Michigan 107, Iowa 0 ===
Iowa at Michigan

Team	1	2	Total
Iowa	0	0	0
• Michigan	65	42	107

- Date: November 8
- Location: Regents Field • Ann Arbor, MI

The Wolverines improved their record to 8-0 with a 107-0 win over Iowa. Michigan scored 17 touchdowns in the game, and its point total was the largest score ever registered against a Big Ten Conference team, and "the largest number ever chalked up by one big university against another." Fielding Yost was absent from the game, choosing to travel to Minnesota to watch the Golden Gophers play in preparation for the upcoming game between the two schools. The Detroit Free Press wrote after the game that "Yost's smile can be seen all the way from Minneapolis."

Michigan scored 65 points in the first half, and its offense dominated the game. The Michigan Alumnus reported:

"[T]he versatility of Michigan's play so disconcerted the Iowa team within the first ten minutes that she seemed wholly bewildered. Delayed passes, fake kicks, double passes, end runs, line-bucks off tackle and into the line followed each other like kaleidoscopic transitions. Gains were made at every point and in every conceivable manner."

The Detroit Free Press also noted the innovative nature of Michigan's offensive game plan:

"Michigan to-day mixed up her plays so completely that Iowa was completely bewildered. Delayed passes, double passes, ends skirting ends, halves dodging in between end and tackle after their opponents had been boxed out and in, tackles and full back hitting the line like trip hammers made the giant Hawkeyes look like a weak scrub team."

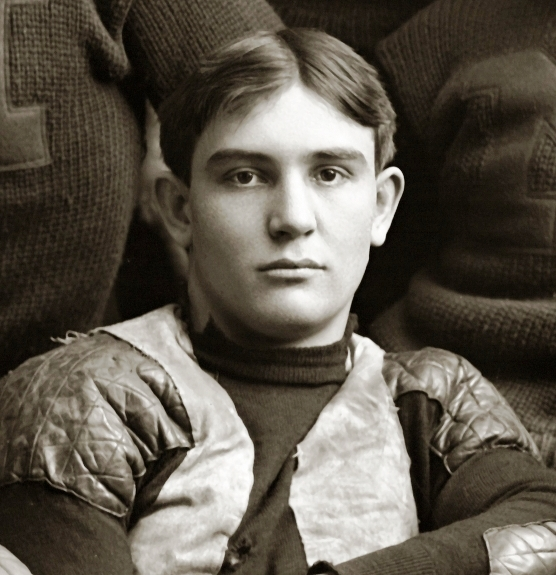
Everett Sweeley was the star of the Iowa game for Michigan, returning a punt 90 yards for a touchdown, kicking 10 extra points and a field goal, and punting for a 50-yard average.

Everett Sweeley was singled out as the star of the Iowa game for Michigan. He converted 10 goals from touchdown, punted for an average of 50 yards, kicked a field goal from the 35-yard line, and returned a punt 90 yards for a touchdown.

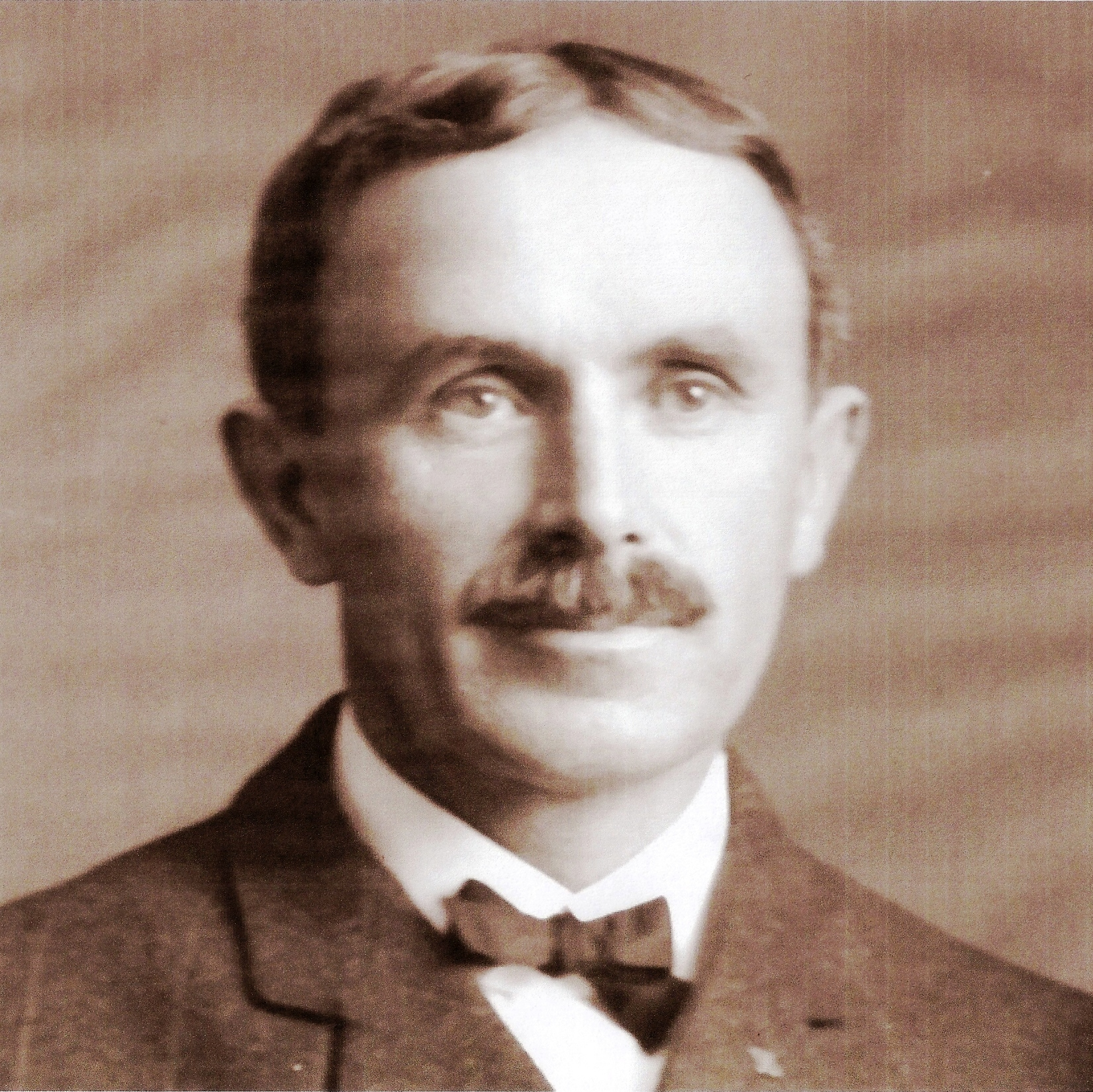
Keene Fitzpatrick, who stepped in as field coach against Iowa, was also a renowned track coach and "one of the pioneers of intercollegiate sport."

After the game, the umpire, Hoagland of Princeton, praised Michigan's blocking (then known as interference): "If you can tell me how you are going to break such a perfect interference, four men running ahead of the man with the ball on end runs without allowing Michigan to make a score, I would like to know how it is done." Michigan's trainer, Keene Fitzpatrick, filled in for Yost as the on-field coach against Iowa. After the game, Fitzpatrick noted:

"I think our team-work today was fine. The men certainly have the right spirit. Coach Yost hated to go away. ... The last thing he said to me was, 'Keene, just before they go into the game, give them a good talk.' Well, I guess they did, and I am proud of them."

One of the Iowa team members reported receiving a message from Iowa City: "Oh, My. Isn't it awful. Box the remains and send them home."

In the first eight games of the season, Michigan had scored 537 points (67.1 points per game), more than the 506 points Michigan's 1901 team had scored in the entire regular season.

The game was played in halves of 35 and 30 minutes. Michigan's starting lineup was Graver (left end), Palmer (left tackle), McGugin (left guard), Gregory (center), Carter (right guard), Maddock (right tackle), Sweeley (right end), Weeks (quarterback), Heston (left halfback), Herrnstein (right halfback) and Jones (fullback).

=== Michigan 21, Chicago 0 ===
Michigan at Chicago

Team	1	2	Total
• Michigan	10	11	21
Chicago	0	0	0

- Date: November 15
- Location: Marshall Field • Chicago, IL
- Game start: 2:15 p. m.
- Game attendance: 14,000
- Referee: Joseph Beacham

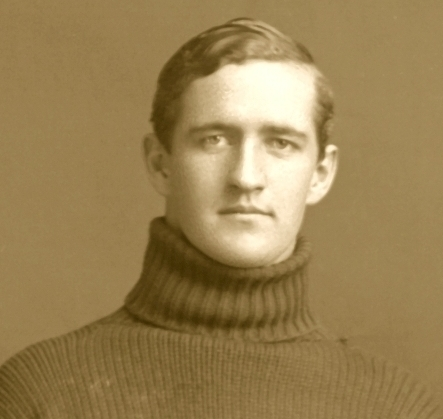
Michigan fullback Paul J. Jones later served 42 years as a federal judge in Cleveland.

Michigan returned to Marshall Field in Chicago to play Amos Alonzo Stagg's Chicago Maroons on November 15, 1902. Michigan won the game 21–0 in front of a crowd of 14,000. Before the game started, the Michigan fans in attendance released toy red balloons marked "Chicago" into the "somewhat murky and frosty atmosphere." One Michigan fan, described as "a long-haired collegian wearing a yellow and blue streamer, told a reporter, "That is the way we will toss Chicago up in the air."

Everett Sweeley gave Michigan a 5–0 lead with a field goal from a difficult angle at the 25-yard line. Later in the first half, Heston took the ball on a delayed pass and ran 71 yards for a touchdown. Michigan led 10–0 at halftime. In the second half, Sweeley extended Michigan's lead to 15-0 with a field goal from the 17-yard line. With approximately 10 minutes remaining in the game, left tackle William Palmer ran for a touchdown, and Sweeley converted the goal from touchdown to give Michigan its final total of 21 points.

The game was the second match between the two legendary coaches, Yost and Stagg. Michigan had defeated Chicago 22–0 in 1901. Despite the successive defeats, Stagg was credited with developing a "magnificent defense to hold Yost's 'hurry up' offense to 21 points in 70 minutes of play."

The game was played in halves of 35 minutes. Raymond Starbuck was the umpire. Michigan's starting lineup was Redden (left end), Palmer (left tackle), McGugin (left guard), Gregory (center), Carter (right guard), Maddock (right tackle), Sweeley (right end), Weeks (quarterback), Heston (left halfback), Herrnstein (right halfback) and Jones (fullback).

=== Michigan 63, Oberlin 0 ===
Oberlin at Michigan

Team	1	2	Total
Oberlin	0	0	0
• Michigan	28	35	63

- Date: November 22
- Location: Regents Field • Ann Arbor, MI

Michigan defeated Oberlin 63–0 in the ninth game of the season. Michigan scored 28 points in the first half and 33 in the second. The speed of Michigan's "hurry up" offense was demonstrated by a three-play drive in which Herb Graver returned a kickoff 60 yards and Willie Heston ran the remaining 40 yards for a touchdown.

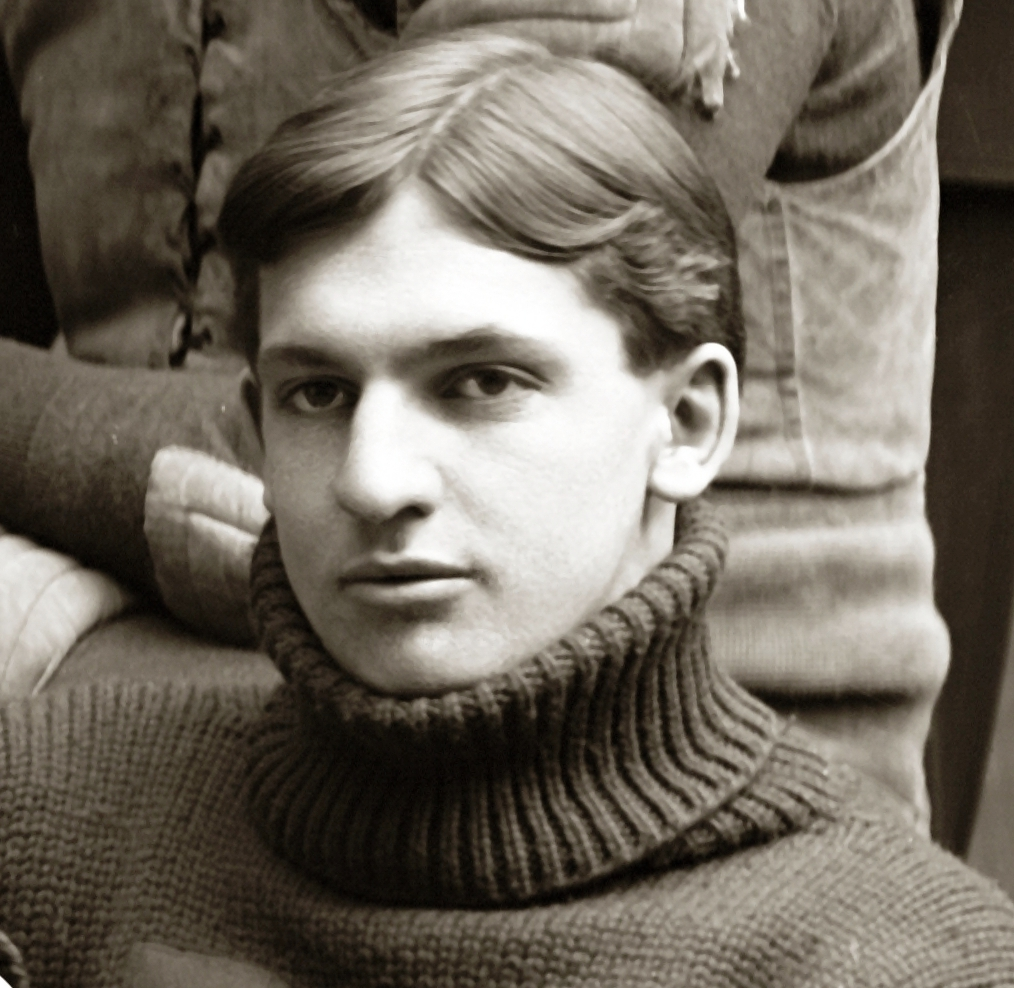
Quarterback Boss Weeks (pictured) called a conservative game against Oberlin with Minnesota coach Henry L. Williams in the stands scouting the Wolverines

Early in the second half, Herb Graver fumbled the ball at Michigan's 10-yard line, and the ball was recovered by Oberlin. On a fake field goal, Oberlin took the ball to the four-yard line but was unable to advance the ball further and missed a field goal attempt. Michigan's Herrnstein and Sweeley were both taken out of the game with injuries to their knees.

With Minnesota's head coach Henry L. Williams and five of his players attending the game to scout the Wolverines, Michigan's quarterback Boss Weeks did not open up the variety of Michigan's plays and "did not pull much down out of his sleeve for their edification." Only once did Michigan run one of its renowned trick plays, a double pass to Everett Sweeley that was good for 15 yards.

After the game, the umpire, Allen of Chicago, was asked what he thought of the Michigan team and responded: "Why, it goes without saying that Michigan is a wonder. It is the greatest team I ever saw, and I have watched a lot of them."

The game was a benchmark game in which Michigan could be compared to the best teams in the east. Cornell had defeated Oberlin 57–0 earlier in the year, and the Detroit Free Press suggested that Michigan's victory by a greater margin "may give the easterners an eye-opener."

With the popularity of the "Point-a-Minute" tradition at Michigan, the Detroit Free Press reported: "The score is one of particularly gratification to Michigan's enthusiasts as it makes Yost's whirlwinds secure a record that never was equalled before, and probably never will be again. Michigan started out the season with as tough a schedule apparently as any team in the west, and if anybody had made a break that this aggregation would be a 'point to the minute' team the man who made the assertion would have been the guy of the town. Yet now, having played 540 minutes, this scoring machine has piled up 621 points, and even if Michigan is shut out by Minnesota in seventy minutes of play the Wolverines will have obtained an average that is the greatest feat in gridiron history."

The game was played in halves of 30 minutes. Michigan's starting lineup was Redden (left end), Cole (left tackle), McGugin (left guard), Gregory (center), Carter (right guard), Maddock (right tackle), Sweeley (right end), Weeks (quarterback), Heston (left halfback), Herrnstein (right halfback) and Jones (fullback).

=== Michigan 23, Minnesota 6 ===
Minnesota at Michigan

Team	1	2	Total
Minnesota	0	6	6
• Michigan	12	11	23

- Date: November 27
- Location: Regents Field • Ann Arbor, MI
- Game start: 2:15 p. m.

In the final game of the 1902 season, Michigan defeated Minnesota 23–6 on Thanksgiving Day. The game got under way at 2:15 p.m. on a brisk afternoon in Ann Arbor. Michigan took the opening kickoff and sustained a 90-yard, seven-minute drive ending with a touchdown by Joe Maddock and a goal after touchdown by Everett Sweeley. The Detroit Free Press reported that, during the opening drive, "the Minnesota line was hurled back, again and again, like that of a minor college eleven." Michigan's second touchdown came on an end run by Heston from the 35-yard line, with Sweeley again kicking the goal to give Michigan a 12–0 lead at halftime. At halftime, South Bend, Indiana resident Louis Elbel conducted the Michigan band as it played a song Elbel had composed four years earlier which was then known as "The Champions of the West" (now known as "The Victors").

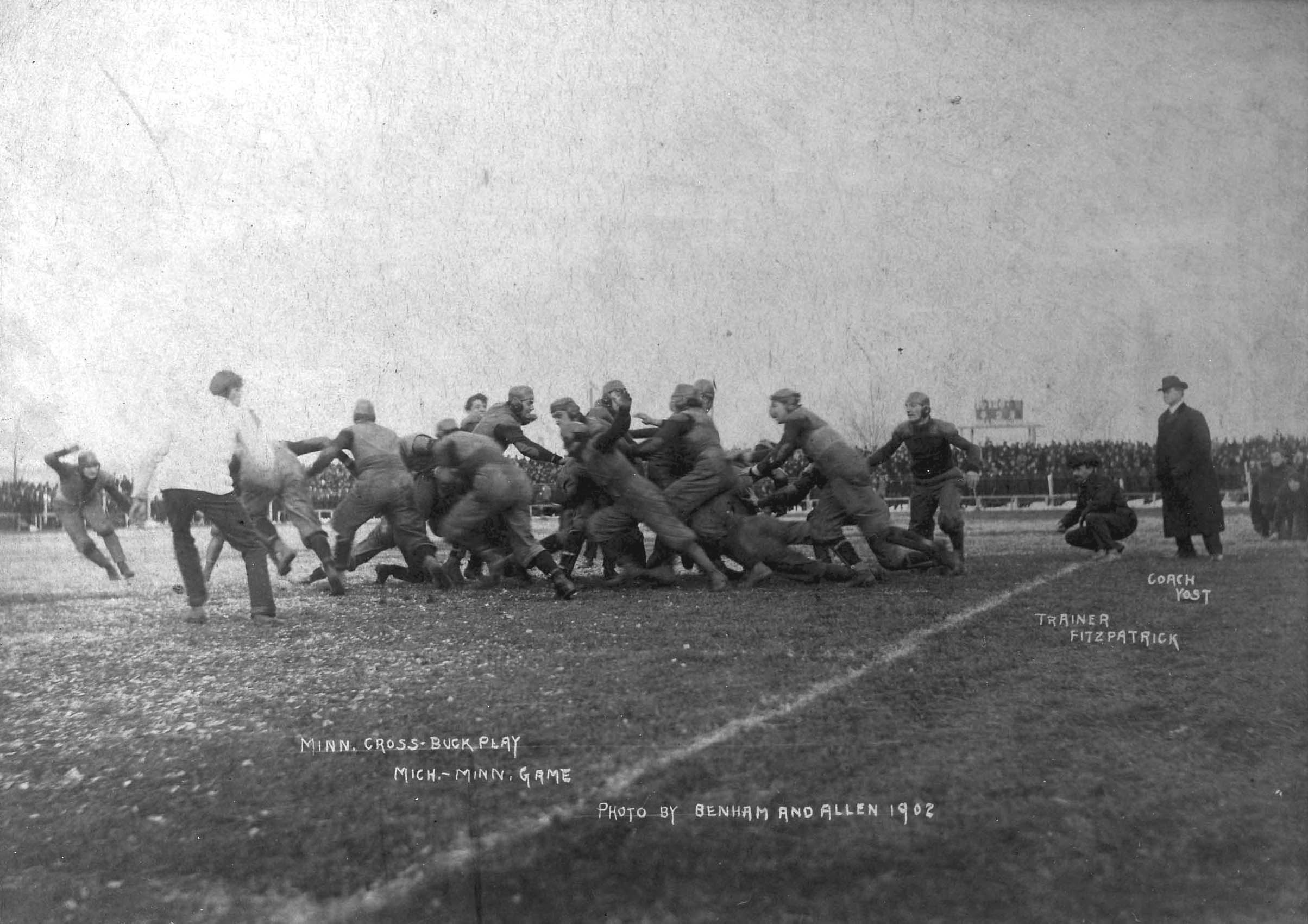
Yost (on the sideline at right) coaching Michigan against Minnesota

In the second half, the Golden Gophers scored after Boss Weeks missed the catch on a punt. The ball contacted Weeks and bounded past him. Flynn of Minnesota recovered the ball and ran for a touchdown, only the second touchdown scored against Michigan since Fielding Yost took over as head coach in 1901. Michigan's leading scorer, Albert Herrnstein, was pulled from the game in the second half due to an injury. The Detroit Free Press described Herrnstein's removal from his final game for Michigan as follows: "He had been laid out a number of times, but refused to quit the game until he was unable to stand. Then, crying, he was dragged off the field by trainer Keene Fitzpatrick." On its next drive, Michigan was stopped at Minnesota's 25-yard line, and Sweeley kicked a field goal for five points to give the Wolverines a 17–6 lead. Sweeley's field goal was converted from a difficult angle, and its success "set the rooters wild." Later in the game, Heston scored the game's final touchdown on a run from the 35-yard line, as he hurdled over a Minnesota tackler. Sweeley added the goal after touchdown to give Michigan the win at 23–6. With the win, Michigan completed its second consecutive perfect season under Fielding Yost.

The game was played in equal halves of 35 minutes. Michigan's starting lineup was Redden (left end), Cole (left tackle), McGugin (left guard), Gregory (center), Carter (right guard), Maddock (right tackle), Sweeley (right end), Weeks (quarterback), Heston (left halfback), Herrnstein (right halfback) and Graver (fullback).

== Postseason ==
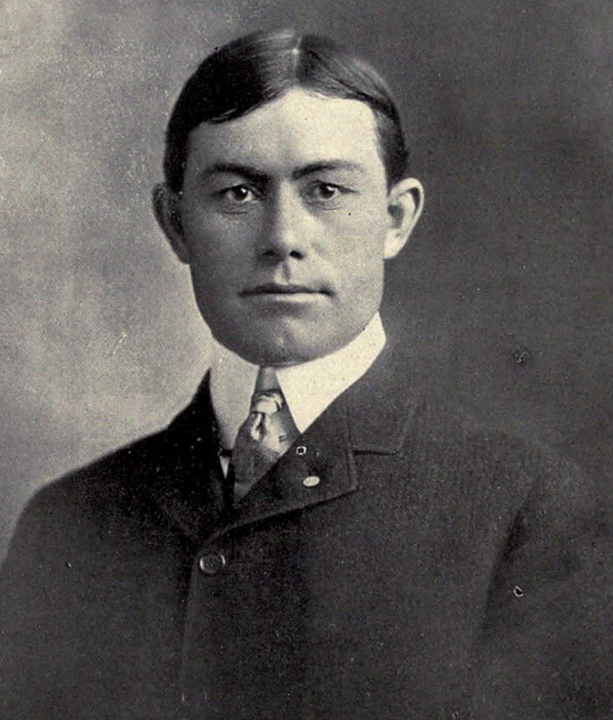
Fielding H. Yost compiled a 22–0 record in his first two years as Michigan's coach.

The 1902 Michigan football team won Michigan's second consecutive western football championship. Although there was no mechanism in place at the time for the selection of a national champion, the 1902 Wolverines have been recognized as the national championship team by the Billingsley Report, Helms Athletic Foundation, Houlgate System, National Championship Foundation and Parke H. Davis. The team finished the season undefeated and untied, having prevailed in all eleven of their games by a combined score of 644 to 12. The 1902 squad was the second of five consecutive high-scoring teams that came to be known as Coach Yost's "Point-a-Minute" teams. From 1901 to 1905, Yost's teams compiled a record of 55–1–1 and outscored their opponents by a combined score of 2,821 to 42.

Team captain and quarterback Boss Weeks wrote a review of the 1902 season for the 1903 yearbook, the Michiganensian. Weeks opened his review as follows: "The story of the football season of 1902 is easily told. Champions of the West, with no one to dispute it." In the same publication, Fielding Yost published a 15-point essay entitled, "Why Michigan Is Great." Some of Yost's points included the following:

"First. Speed. Both as a team and in the individual players, Michigan was speedy. ...
Second. Knowledge of the Game. All of the Michigan players were well versed in the fundamental principles of the game in every department. ...
Third. Endurance. the men are of wonderful endurance. This is much due to their fine training ...
Fourth. Spirit. Among the players there is the finest of fellow-feeling. The men's love of the game had helped give them the proper spirit. They have the desire to win -- the spirit of fighters.
Fifth. Team Work. Michigan's team work has been wonderful. ...
Seventh. Weight. Michigan had a well-balanced team. The average was 182 pounds very equally distributed. But one man weighed over 200 pounds (Carter) and but one less than 170 pounds (Weeks at quarterback).
Eighth. Style of Attack. Michigan varied her onslaughts very much, depending largely upon the style of defense used by the team opposing it. Every man on the team was used to carry the ball, thus distributing the work.
Ninth. Generalship. Captain Weeks deserves great credit for Michigan's success. As a leader of forces and strategist I believe he has no equal on the gridiron today. ...
Tenth. Punting. In Sweeley, Michigan has one of the greatest kickers in the country. Never has he had a kick blocked in his four years' play at Michigan. ...
Twelfth. Defense. Michigan's defensive playing has been wonderful. No team was able to cross Michigan's goal on straight football in the last two years ...
Fifteenth. Met All Teams. Michigan's schedule was far harder than that usually arranged for a team. She played five state universities and all the strong Western teams."

=== Awards and honors ===
Several players received postseason honors:Joseph Maddock, Willie Heston, and captain Boss Weeks were selected All-America by the Newark Advocate. Weeks made Caspar Whitney's second team. Maddock, Heston, Weeks, Everett Sweeley Paul J. Jones, Curtis Redden, and Dan McGugin all made All-Western.

=== Popularity of football on campus ===
With the success of Yost's football team, football enjoyed a surge of popularity on Michigan's campus in 1902. Even the student literary magazine, The Inlander, which usually filled its pages with poems, short stories, and essays by students, gave its entire December 1902 issue to a celebration of the football team. The special issue featured a photograph of Yost on the cover and included all manner of facts and figures on the popular team. Noting the popularity of the sport with Michigan's female students, Detroit Free Press in November 1902 wrote about the spectators in attendance at Michigan's home game against Minnesota:

"But the dominant note of the gathering was the girl. She was there in every type and style, in every section of the stands and on every row. There was the college girl and the town girl, sweater girl and gown girl. And whatever type of girl she was elsewhere, she was always the Michigan girl."

== Personnel ==
=== Depth chart ===
The following chart provides a visual depiction of Michigan's lineup during the 1902 season with games started at the position reflected in parentheses. The chart mimics Yost's short punt formation while on offense, with the quarterback under center.

LE
Curtis Redden (9)
Herb Graver (2)
Norman Sterry (0)

LT	LG	C	RG	RT
William S. Palmer (4)	Dan McGugin (10)	George W. Gregory (11)	Charles B. Carter (10)	Joseph Maddock (11)
William C. "King" Cole (3)	Harold Hill Baker (1)	Cecil Gooding (0)	James E. Lawrence (1)	Burt E. Barlow (0)
Harold Hill Baker (1)	Kennedy L. Potter (0)	Lorin H. Jones (0)	John F. Lewis (0)	Rolla Bigelow (0)
James Forest (1)	James Turner (0)		William Weeks (0)	Robert Ferris (0)
Moses S. Johnson (1)				
James E. Lawrence (1)				

RE
Everett Sweeley (7)
William C. "King" Cole (4)

QB
Boss Weeks (10)
Herb Graver (1)
John Henry James (0)

LHB	RHB
Willie Heston (9)	Albert E. Herrnstein (11)
Herb Graver (1)	Paul Bert Dickey (0)
Ross Kidston (1)	Frank Doty (0)
Earl Cooley (0)	David L. Dunlap (0)
Samuel Sackett (0)	Norman Sterry (0)

FB
Paul J. Jones (7)
James E. Lawrence (3)
Herb Graver (1)
Ralph Lovejoy Drake (0)

=== Varsity letter winners ===
The following 14 players received varsity "M" letters for their participation on the 1902 football team:

==== Line ====
Player	Position	Games started	Hometown	Height	Weight	Class	Prior experience
Charles B. Carter	Guard	10	Auburn, Maine	6' 0"	231	Law '05	Brown Varsity (2 years)
William C. "King" Cole	End, tackle	7	Chicago, Illinois	5' 10½"	178	Law '05	Marietta College (2 years)
Herbert S. Graver	End, back	5	Chicago, Illinois	5' 8¼"	162	Eng '04	Varsity (1 year)
George W. Gregory	Center	11	Redding, California	5' 10-8/10"	190	Law '04	Varsity (1 year)
Joseph Maddock	Tackle	11	East Jordan, Michigan	5' 11"	187	Spec. Lit.	Albion (2 years)
Dan McGugin	Guard	10	Tingley, Iowa	5' 11"	184	Law '04	Varsity (1 year)
William S. Palmer	Tackle	4	Chester, Massachusetts	5' 8"	189	Law '05	Chester H.S.
Curtis Redden	End	9	Rossville, Illinois	5' 11"	180	Law '03	Varsity (2 years)
Everett Sweeley	End	7	Sioux City, Iowa	5' 10"	172	Lit '03	Varsity (3 years)

==== Backfield ====
Player	Position	Games started	Hometown	Height	Weight	Class	Prior experience
Albert E. Herrnstein	Halfback	11	Chillicothe, Ohio	5' 10"	168	Lit '03	Varsity (1 year)
Willie Heston	Halfback	9	Grants Pass, Oregon	5' 8"	180	Law '04	Varsity (1 year)
Paul J. Jones	Fullback	7	Youngstown, Ohio	6' 0"	170	Law '04	Reserves (1 year)
James E. Lawrence	Fullback, tackle	5	Ypsilanti, Michigan	6' 1/2"	187	Lit '06	Ypsilanti H.S.
Harrison "Boss" Weeks	Quarterback	10	Allegan, Michigan	5' 7"	158	Lit '06	Varsity (2 years)

=== Varsity substitutes and reserves ===
==== Line ====
Player	Position	Games started	Hometown	Height	Weight	Class	Prior experience
Harold Hill Baker	Guard, tackle	2	Rochester, New York	6' 0"	185	Homeop '05	University of Rochester; Reserves (1 year)
Burt E. Barlow	Tackle	0	Coldwater, Michigan			Med '04	
Rolla Bigelow	Tackle	0	Owosso, Michigan			Eng '05	
Robert Ferris	Tackle	0	Greenville, Michigan			Eng '05	
James Forrest	Tackle	1	Ann Arbor, Michigan	6' 2½"	188	P.G. Law	Reserves (1 year)
Cecil Gooding	Center	0	Ann Arbor, Michigan	6' 1½"	188	Eng '05	1905 All-Freshman
Moses M. Johnson	Tackle	1	Wichita, Kansas				
Lorin H. Jones	Center	0	Union City, Michigan			'05	
John F. Lewis	Guard	0	Covington, Indiana			'05	
Kennedy L. Potter	Guard	0	Jackson, Michigan			Law '04	
Norman Sterry	End, halfback	0	Los Angeles, California	5' 9¼"	160	Law '03	Reserves (1 year)
James Turner	Guard	0	Lansing, Michigan			Law '04	
William Rawle Weeks	Guard	0	Allegan, Michigan			Law '05	

==== Backfield ====
Player	Position	Games started	Hometown	Height	Weight	Class	Prior experience
Earl Cooley	Halfback	0	Trinidad, Colorado			Law '03	
Paul Bert Dickey	Halfback	0	Chicago, Illinois	5' 10"	156	Lit '06	S. Division H.S. (Chicago)
Frank Doty	Halfback	0	Pontiac, Michigan			Lit '05	
Ralph Lovejoy Drake	Fullback	0	Ann Arbor, Michigan			Eng '05	
David L. Dunlap	Halfback	0	Hopkinton, Iowa	5' 11¾"	170	Med '04	Reserves (1 year)
John Henry James	Quarterback	0	Detroit, Michigan			Eng '05	
Ross Howland Kidston	Halfback	1	LaGrange, Illinois	5' 10½"	170	Lit '05	1905 All-Freshman
Samuel Jefferson Sackett	Halfback	0	Ann Arbor, Michigan			Lit '03	

=== 1902 players who became coaches ===
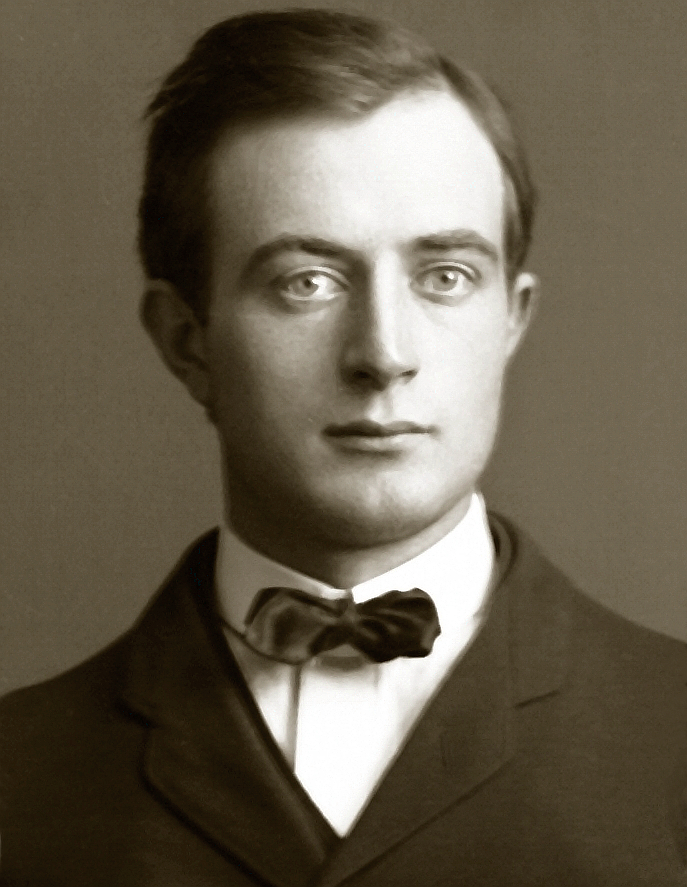
Guard Dan McGugin later gained fame as Vanderbilt's coach.

Fielding Yost earned a reputation as an innovator of the sport. His "Point-a-Minute" teams at Michigan compiled an overall record of 43-0-1 from 1901 to 1905 and outscored their opponents 2,326 to 40. The unprecedented performance of these teams created a demand for Yost's players, known as the "Yost-men", to serve as head coaches at other schools. Ten of the 14 lettermen on Yost's 1902 team became college football head coaches. Dan McGugin, who played left guard for the 1902 team, was inducted into the College Football Hall of Fame for his accomplishments as head coach at Vanderbilt from 1904 to 1934. And end/tackle William C. "King" Cole led the Nebraska Cornhuskers to two Missouri Valley Conference championships. The 1902 Michigan players who went on to head coaching positions are:

- William Cole served as the head coach at Marietta College (1903), Virginia (1905–1906) and Nebraska (1907–1910);
- Herb Graver served as the head coach at Marietta College in 1904;
- Albert E. Herrnstein was the head coach for the Haskell Indian School (1903–1904), Purdue (1905) and Ohio State (1906–1909);
- Willie Heston was the head coach for Drake (1905) and North Carolina State (1906);
- Paul J. Jones spent one year as the head coach at Western Reserve;
- Joe Maddock was the head coach at Oregon (1924) and Utah (1904–1909);
- Dan McGugin was the head coach at Vanderbilt (1904–1917, 1919–1934);
- Curtis Redden was the head coach at Kentucky (1905);
- Everett Sweeley was the head coach at Morningside College (1903) and Washington State (1904–1905); and
- Boss Weeks was the head coach at Kansas (1903) and Beloit (1904).

=== Scoring leaders ===
The following chart accounts for the 644 points scored by the 1902 football team and is based on the box scores published in 1902 by the Detroit Free Press and The Michigan Alumnus.

Player	Touchdowns (5 points)	Extra points 1 point	Field goals (5 points)	Safeties (2 points)	Total points
Albert Herrnstein	26	1	0	0	131
James Lawrence	12	53	0	0	113
Willie Heston	15	0	0	0	75
Joe Maddock	13	0	0	0	65
Paul Jones	11	0	0	0	55
Everett Sweeley	1	22	4	0	47
William Cole	4	13	0	0	33
William Palmer	5	0	0	0	25
Herb Graver	5	3	0	0	23
Ross Kidston	4	0	0	0	20
Paul Dickey	3	0	0	0	10
Dan McGugin	2	0	0	0	10
Curtis Redden	2	0	0	0	10
Harold Baker	1	0	0	0	5
Charles Carter	1	0	0	0	5
James Forrest	1	0	0	0	5
na	0	0	0	1	2
Total	106	92	4	1	644

=== Coaching staff ===
- Head coach: Fielding H. Yost
- Freshman coach: Howard Richardson
- Trainer: Keene Fitzpatrick
- Manager: Archibald Smith
- Graduate Director of Athletics: Charles A. Baird
