= Charles B. Carter =

American football player, lawyer, and politician (1880–1927)

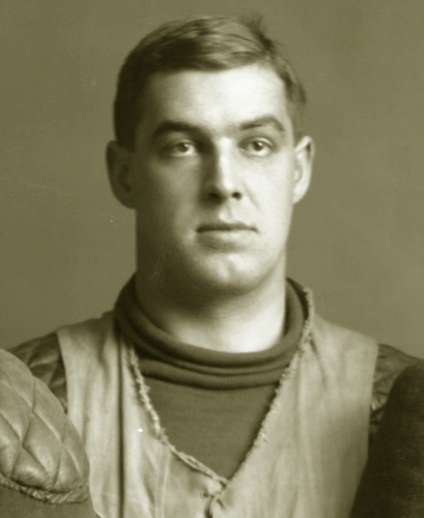
- Photograph of Carter cropped from the 1904 Michigan team portrait

Biographical details
- Born: May 10, 1880; Auburn, Maine, U.S.
- Died: April 6, 1927 (aged 46); Augusta, Maine, U.S.

Playing career
- 1900–1901: Brown
- 1902, 1904: Michigan
- Position: Guard

Accomplishments and honors

Championships
- 2× National (1902, 1904)

Charles Blanchard "Babe" Carter (May 10, 1880 – April 6, 1927) was an American football player, lawyer and politician. He was the starting right guard on the University of Michigan's 1902 and 1904 "Point-a-Minute" football teams that compiled a record of 21–0 and outscored opponents 1,211 to 34. He was a lawyer in Maine and also served in the Maine Senate.

== Early life and education ==
Carter was born in Auburn, Maine, and attended the Webster Grammar School and Edward Little High School. He attended Brown University as an undergraduate and played two years of college football for the Brown Bears football team.

=== University of Michigan ===
In 1902, Carter enrolled at the University of Michigan Law School. He started at the right guard position for Fielding H. Yost's renowned 1902 and 1904 "Point-a-Minute" football teams that compiled a record of 21–0 and outscored opponents 1,211 to 34. At 236 pounds, Carter was by far the largest player on Yost's "Point-a-Minute" team and was known by the nickname "Babe" Carter. A profile of Carter in the university's 1903 yearbook noted: "'Those who know' at Michigan designate Charles B. Carter as one of the fastest big men who ever appeared on a Western gridiron. ... His wonderful handling of his massive frame, his agility and his nerve was astonishing." Despite his size and playing as a lineman, Carter scored six touchdowns for the 1904 team.

== Career ==
Carter was admitted to the bar in Androscoggin County, Maine, in February 1907. He maintained a law practice in Lewiston, Maine, from 1907 until his death in 1927. He became general counsel to the Great Northern Paper Company and as counsel for the Maine Central Railroad. He handled a number of jury trials for the Maine Central and also had a large corporation business, representing clients before the state legislature in hydroelectric and storage matters.

=== Politics ===
In 1925, Carter was elected as a Republican to the Maine Senate representing Androscoggin County. As a state senator, Carter was a leader in the effort to prevent hydroelectric companies from exporting surplus power out of Maine. Carter was a delegate to the 1920 Republican National Convention. According to the Lewiston Evening Journal, he was often talked of as a Republican candidate for Governor of Maine in 1928. The paper described Carter as follows:

He was socially one of the most delightful friends one ever could have. ... He loved social life and the outdoors. ... Used to books, reading, fine surroundings, he was at home in any surroundings. He had a massive figure, impressive in appearance, powerful in manner and bearing.

He was a member of the Episcopal Church, a Mason and a member of the Delta Phi and Delta Chi fraternities.

== Death ==
Carter died suddenly of a heart block in April 1927 at age 46 following an evening meeting with Governor Owen Brewster in Augusta, Maine. Carter was survived by his wife, the former Clare Scanlan, who he married in 1911.
