= James E. Lawrence =

American football player (1882–1941)

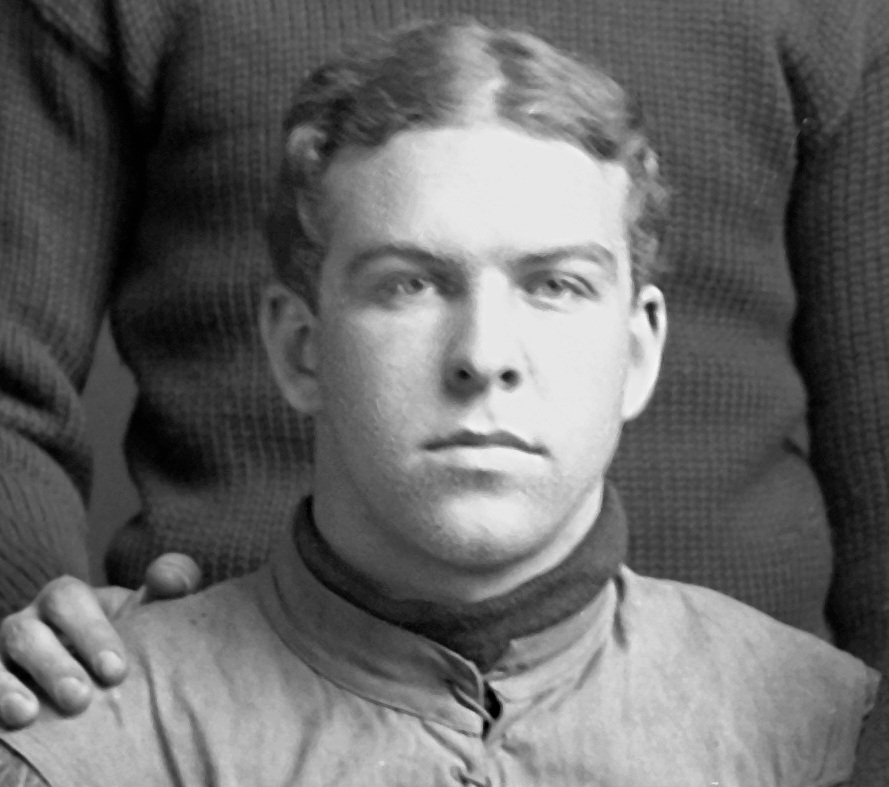

Profile
- Positions: Tackle, Fullback, Placekicker

Personal information
- Born: October 10, 1882; Michigan, U.S.
- Died: May 18, 1941 (aged 58); Los Angeles, California, U.S.

Career information
- College: Michigan (1902)

Awards and highlights
- National champion (1902)

James Edmund Lawrence (October 10, 1882 – May 18, 1941) was an American football player. He played college football for the 1902 Michigan Wolverines football team that compiled an 11–0 record and outscored opponents 644 to 12. He scored 113 points for the 1902 Michigan team, a figure which ranked among the five highest single-season point totals in Michigan history until 1940 and which still ranks among the top 10 scoring seasons by a Michigan player. In an October 8, 1902 game against Michigan Agricultural College (now known as Michigan State University), Lawrence set a Michigan record by converting 19 of 20 point after touchdown kicks. At the time of his death, The New York Times noted that Lawrence was "considered the greatest place-kicker the University of Michigan ever had."

== Early life ==
James Edmund Lawrence was born in Michigan, 10 October 1882. His father, James Elliot Lawrence, who was born in Michigan and was a business man in Washtenaw County with Farrington B F & Co. (Benjamin F. Farrington, Clifford Elliott, James E. Laurence). Wholesale Grocers and Coffee and Spice Mills, 54 and 56 Jefferson ave and 128 and 130 Woodbridge w. His mother was Marion Kitchen. The father died in 1886. His mother, Marion [daughter of Joseph and Harriet Kitchen;, continued to raise the family in Ypsilanti; a "capitalist", Lawrence had an older brother Don (b. Sept. 1874) and two older sisters Harriet (b. Nov. 1876) and Grace (b. June 1879). At the time of the 1900 Census, Lawrence's aunt, Josephine Kitchen, and a servant, Charlotte Brook, also lived with the family.

Lawrence attended Ypsilanti High School where he played four years of football, two years at the tackle position and two years at the fullback position. According to one account, "At both places he was a whole team in himself."

== University of Michigan ==
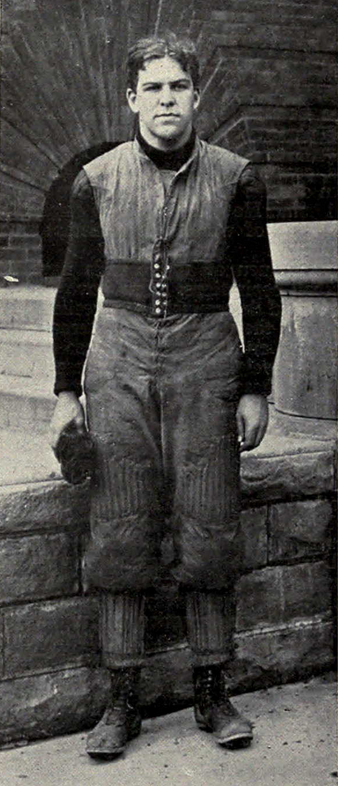
Lawrence from 1902 Michiganensian

Lawrence enrolled in the engineering department at the University of Michigan in 1902. As a freshman, he participated in tryouts for the football team held at Whitmore Lake, Michigan. Lawrence was six feet and one-half inches tall and weighed 187 pounds. Michigan's head coach Fielding H. Yost recognized that Lawrence had "the weight, speed, and nerve of a valuable man" and "all the qualities of a fullback".

The 1902 Michigan Wolverines football team won all 11 of its games and outscored opponents by a combined score of 644 to 12. Lawrence appeared in 10 of the 11 games played by the team, missing only the Notre Dame game. He was the starting fullback in three games and appeared in other games at the tackle and guard positions. In 10 games for the 1902 Wolverines, Lawrence scored 113 points on 12 touchdowns (scored as five points under 1902 rules) and 53 point after touchdown ("PAT) conversions. Lawrence's 1902 point total ranked among the five highest single-season point totals in Michigan history until 1940 and still ranks among the top 10 scoring seasons by a Michigan player. In an October 8, 1902 game against Michigan Agricultural College (now known as Michigan State University), Lawrence set a Michigan record by converting 19 of 20 point after touchdown ("PAT") kicks.

Lawrence's highest scoring point totals were as follows:

- October 11, 1902: 29 points on 4 touchdowns and 9 point after touchdown (PAT) kicks against Indiana
- November 8, 1902: 19 points on 3 touchdowns and 4 PAT kicks against Iowa
- October 8, 1902: 19 points on 19 PAT kicks against Michigan Agricultural
- October 25, 1902: 17 points on 2 touchdowns and 7 PAT kicks against Ohio State
- October 4, 1902: 13 points on 1 touchdown and 8 PAT kicks against Case Scientific School
- November 22, 1902: 10 points on 2 touchdowns against Oberlin College

While Lawrence made a name for himself due to his scoring, he was also a valuable contributor on defense: "On defense, he used his weight to a great advantage in breaking up interference and in supporting the line."

At the time of his death 39 years later, The New York Times noted that he was "considered the greatest place-kicker the University of Michigan ever had".

== Later life ==
At the time of the 1910 United States census, Lawrence was living in Pontiac, Michigan with his wife Nellie E. Lawrence. His occupation was listed as a draftsman in a factory.

In a draft registration card completed in September 1918, Lawrence indicated that he was living in Highland Park, Michigan, and employed by McCormack & Lawrence at the Free Press Building in Detroit.

At the time of the 1920 United States census, Lawrence was living in Highland Park with his wife Nellie and their nine-year-old son Robert. His occupation was listed as the secretary of a real estate company.

By the time of the 1930 United States census, Lawrence had moved to Los Angeles, California. He was living at 261 West Second Street with his wife Nellie S. Lawrence and their 19-year-old son Robert S. Lawrence. His occupation was listed at that time as a real estate broker.

Lawrence died in Los Angeles in May 1941 at age 58.
