= Rolla Bigelow =

American banker and football player (1878–1952)

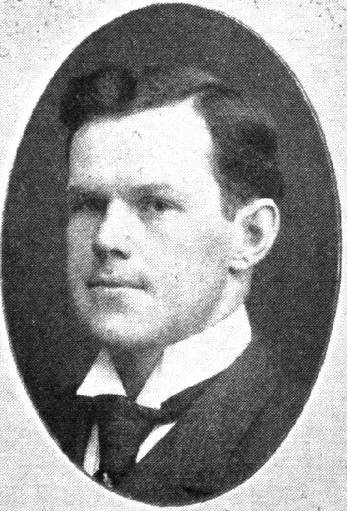

Profile
- Positions: Halfback, Fullback

Personal information
- Born: June 19, 1878; Corunna, Shiawassee County, Michigan, U.S.
- Died: December 16, 1952 (aged 74); Winter Park, Florida, U.S.

Career information
- College: Michigan Agr. College (1898); Michigan (1902–1903)

Awards and highlights
- National champion (1903)

Robert Lavante "Rolla" Bigelow (June 19, 1878 – December 16, 1952) was an American banker and football player. A native of Shiawassee County, Michigan, he played college football for Michigan Agricultural College in 1898 and the University of Michigan from 1902 to 1903. He played for Fielding H. Yost's "Point-a-Minute" teams that compiled a record of 22-0-1 and outscored opponents 1,209 to 18 during the 1902 and 1903 seasons. He later moved to New York where he founded the investment banking firm, Bigelow & Co., in the 1910s. In 1921, he founded Bigelow State Bank, which later became Eastern Exchange Bank.

== Early life ==
Bigelow was born in Corunna in Shiawassee County, Michigan in 1878. His parents, Rolla P. Bigelow and Charlotte (Pratt) Bigelow, were both Michigan natives. At the time of the 1880 United States census, Bigelow's father was employed as a store clerk in Corunna. He was later employed as a "commercial traveler." The family moved to Owosso, Michigan, where Bigelow was raised.

Bigelow initially attended Michigan Agricultural College (M.A.C.), later known as Michigan State University. He played for the M.A.C. football team in 1898.

== University of Michigan ==
Bigelow transferred to the University of Michigan where he played college football for Fielding H. Yost's "Point-a-Minute" teams. Bigelow was a reserve tackle on the 1902 Michigan Wolverines football team that finished with an 11–0 record, outscored its opponents by a combined score of 644 to 12, and has been recognized as national champions. The following year, he started two games, one at halfback and the other at fullback for the 1903 Michigan team that compiled an 11–0–1 record, outscored opponents 565 to 6, and has been recognized as the 1903 national champions. Bigelow scored five touchdowns (including three in one game) for the 1903 team. He graduated from Michigan with an engineering degree in 1905.

== Banking career ==
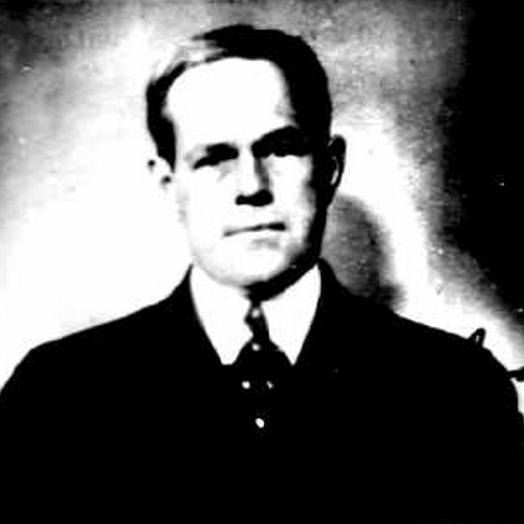
Bigelow's 1922 passport photograph

After graduating from Michigan, Bigelow became a banker in New York. As of 1911, he was employed as a banker at 49 Wall Street in New York. By 1918, he had formed Bigelow & Co., an investment banking house with offices at 25 Pine Street in New York.

In January 1921, he formed Bigelow State Bank, a New York state chartered bank based in Manhattan, and served as its president. At the time of its opening, The New York Times reported that it "offers banking facilities to individuals who wish to deposit small amounts. 'The bank for the individual' is the motto of the new institution."

In December 1924, Bigelow changed the name of his bank to the Eastern Exchange Bank and continued to serve as its president. In November 1926, W. A. Harriman & Co., Inc., purchased "a substantial interest" in the bank, with Bigelow remaining as the president. At the time of the Harriman investment, The New York Times described the business of Bigelow's bank as follows: "This bank is said to be the only institution in New York City confining its activities entirely to individual deposit accounts, and makes a point of extending banking facilities to small accounts. It does no commercial business and discounts no commercial paper, confining its loans only to marketable collateral." In May 1928, the Eastern Exchange Bank moved its headquarters from 10 Broadway to the Harriman Building at 37 Broadway.

== Family and later years ==
Bigelow was married to Doris Bissell in 1916. They had a daughter, Betsy Bigelow, and a son, Robert Pratt Bigelow. At the time of the 1930 United States census, Bigelow was living in Woodsburgh, Nassau County, New York with his wife Doris, their two children Doris E. Bigelow (age 8) and Robert P. Bigelow (age 3), and three servants. Bigelow's occupation was listed as a bank president.

After retiring, Bigelow moved to Winter Haven in central Florida. In December 1952, he died at an Orlando hospital at age 74 after a brief illness. He left an estate valued at $517,713.
