= Shorty Ellsworth =

American football player and coach (1881–1963)

Biographical details
- Born: August 1, 1881; Boston, Massachusetts, U.S.
- Died: August 19, 1963 (aged 82); Normal, Illinois, U.S.

Playing career
- 1901–1903: Chicago
- Position: Center

Coaching career (HC unless noted)
- 1904–1907: Colorado Mines

Head coaching record
- Overall: 17–1–4

Accomplishments and honors

Awards
- All-Western (1902)

Alfred Chester "Shorty" Ellsworth (August 1, 1881 – August 19, 1963) was an American college football player and coach, mining engineer, and orchardist. He served as the head football coach at the Colorado School of Mines in Golden, Colorado from 1904 to 1907. Ellsworth played college football at the University of Chicago, lettering under coach Amos Alonzo Stagg from 1901 to 1903. He was captain of the 1903 Chicago Maroons football team.

Ellsworth was born on August 1, 1881, in Boston, to Henry and Ada Hurd Ellsworth. He graduated from the University of Chicago in 1904 with a degree in engineering, and then attended graduate school at the Colorado School of Mines. Ellsworth married Lynette Lanyon in 1913, in Pittsburg, Kansas. He later operated mining properties in Colorado and Kansas before 1926, and then an orchard near Richmond, Illinois for 36 years. In 1962, Ellsworth and his wife moved to Normal, Illinois to live with their daughter, Amelia Harsha. He died on August 19, 1963, in Normal. Ellworth was buried at Greenwood Cemetery in Greenwood, Illinois.

== Head coaching record ==
Year	Team	Overall	Conference	Standing	Bowl/playoffs
Colorado Mines Orediggers (Independent) (1904–1907)
1904	Colorado Mines	4–0–1			
1905	Colorado Mines	5–0–1			
1906	Colorado Mines	3–0–2			
1907	Colorado Mines	5–1			
Colorado Mines:		17–1–4			
Total:		17–1–4			
