= Charles A. Fairweather =

American football player and coach (1878–1939)

Biographical details
- Born: 1878
- Died: February 12, 1939 (aged 60–61); Portland, Oregon, U.S.

Playing career
- 1901–1904: Illinois
- Position: Guard

Coaching career (HC unless noted)
- 1905: Washington University
- 1906–1907: Beloit

Administrative career (AD unless noted)
- 1906–1908: Beloit

Head coaching record
- Overall: 12–13–3

Accomplishments and honors

Awards
- All-American (1904); All-Western (1903, 1904)

Charles Arthur Fairweather (1878 – February 12, 1939) was an American college football player and coach. He served as the head football coach at Washington University in St. Louis in 1905 and at Beloit College in Beloit, Wisconsin from 1906 to 1907, compiling a career coaching record of 12–13–3. Fairweather played college football at the University of Illinois, where he was team captain in 1904.

== Head coaching record ==
Year	Team	Overall	Conference	Standing	Bowl/playoffs
Washington University (Independent) (1905)
1905	Washington University	7–3–2			
Washington University:		7–3–2			
Beloit (Independent) (1906–1907)
1906	Beloit	3–4–1			
1907	Beloit	2–6			
Beloit:		5–10–1			
Total:		12–13–3			
