= Boss Weeks =

American football player and coach (1879–1906)

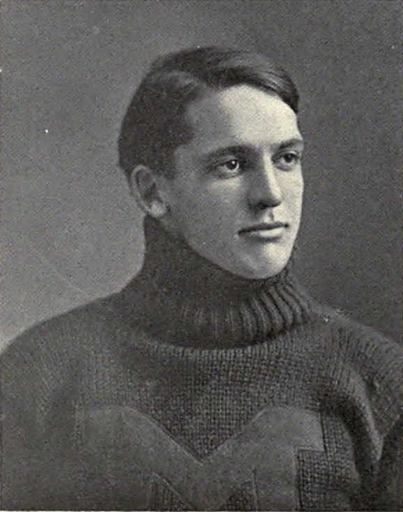
- Weeks from the 1903 Michiganensian

Biographical details
- Born: April 3, 1879; Fort McIntosh, Texas, U.S.
- Died: February 25, 1906 (aged 26); Washington, D.C., U.S.

Playing career
- 1900–1902: Michigan
- Position: Quarterback

Coaching career (HC unless noted)
- 1903: Kansas
- 1904: Beloit

Head coaching record
- Overall: 11–8–1

Accomplishments and honors

Championships
- 2× National (1901, 1902)

Awards
- Second-team All-American (1902); First-team All-Western (1902)

Harrison Samuel "Boss" Weeks Jr. (April 3, 1879 – February 25, 1906) was an American college football player and coach. He played quarterback for the University of Michigan from 1900 to 1902 and served as head football coach at the University of Kansas in 1903 and at Beloit College in Wisconsin in 1904. Weeks was the quarterback and on-field leader of Michigan's national champion "Point-a-Minute" teams that went 22–0 and outscored opponents 1,211 to 12 in 1901 and 1902.

== Early life and playing career ==
Weeks was born to Harrison Samuel Weeks, Sr. (April 5, 1845 – January 23, 1892) and Julia W. Weeks (née Shoemaker) (March 13, 1852 – November 28, 1930), who married on January 14, 1874, in Fort Union, New Mexico. He was born in Fort McIntosh, Texas, where his father, a West Point graduate and career military officer originally from Allegan, Michigan, was stationed at the time. His parents met while his father was stationed at Fort Union, New Mexico, as his mother's family was from nearby rural Mora County, New Mexico. He spent his early childhood growing up on military posts in New Mexico and Texas, where his father was stationed until the family finally moved back to his father's native Allegan, Michigan in 1888. He was the fourth-oldest of eight brothers, five of whom played football for the University of Michigan, and one sister. Three of the brothers earned varsity letters in football, and the oldest of those three brothers, Alanson Weeks (September 15, 1877 – November 25, 1947), played halfback for the 1898 Michigan team that won the school's first Western Conference championship. His eldest brother, Frank Russel Weeks (March 21, 1876 – March 2, 1947), instead became a soldier like their father and later a civil servant working for the US Treasury Department.

Boss Weeks enrolled at Michigan in 1899 and played on the school's "scrub team" as a freshman. As a sophomore, Weeks made the varsity football team where he was the backup quarterback to Edwin McGinnis. In 1901, a new era in Michigan football began as Fielding H. Yost was hired as the school's new football coach. Yost immediately taught Weeks and the Michigan team a new, lightning-fast offense. Under the new scheme, Weeks would call the signals for the next play without a huddle, sometimes while he was "still under the pile from the previous play." If a player was too slow getting line up for the next play, Yost would yell from the sideline, "Are you a spectator? Hurry up! Hurry up!"

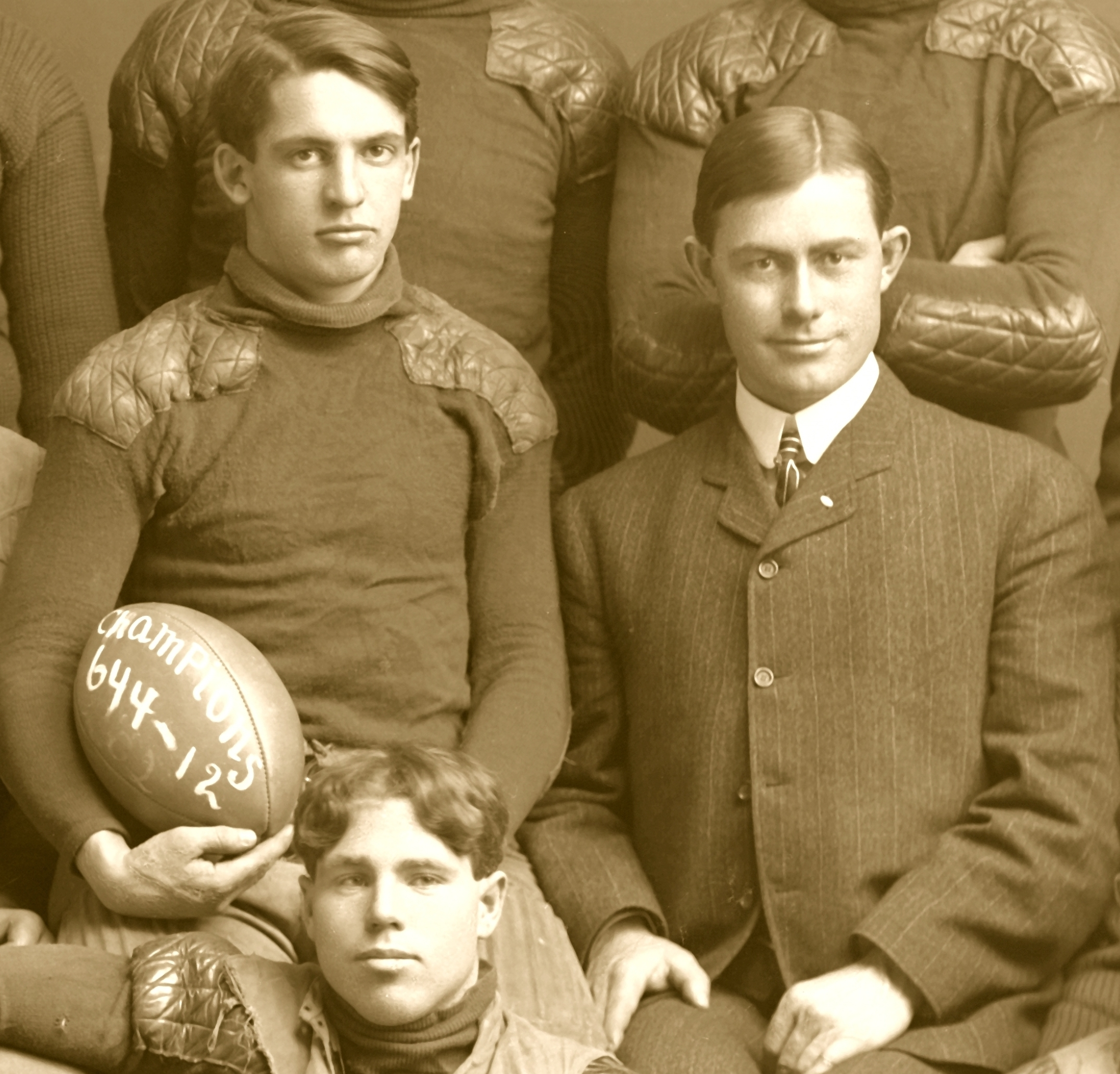
The trio of Boss Weeks (left), Fielding H. Yost (right) and Willie Heston (below) were key individuals in Michigan's "Point-a-Minute" teams of 1901 and 1902.

Weeks started all 11 games at quarterback for the 1901 Michigan Wolverines and had tremendous success with Yost's new system. In the early days of football when Weeks played, the quarterback was the true field general, as there were no communications with the bench, and the quarterback had the responsibility to call the plays on both offense and defense. The 1901 team led by Weeks went undefeated and scored 550 points, earning the team the nickname, "Point-a-Minute." The 1901 team was equally strong on defense, not allowing a single point to be scored through the entire season, and not allowing another team to make a gain of more than 15 yards on a single play. Michigan was invited to play in the first Rose Bowl Game in Pasadena, California, on January 1, 1902, where they defeated Stanford, 49–0.

The following June, the Michigan team elected Weeks as the captain of the 1902 team. Weeks led the 1902 team to another 11–0 record, and the team increased its offensive scoring output to an unprecedented 644 points. The team scored 119 points against Michigan Agricultural and 107 points against Iowa. The only minor blemish on the record of the 1902 team was that, after not allowing opponents to score a single point in 1901, the defense gave up a total of 12 points in 11 games.

Some consider the 1901 and 1902 "Point-a-Minute" teams to be the greatest teams in Michigan Wolverines football history. Looking back in 1930, Fielding Yost said of Weeks: "Michigan had one outstanding leader: Boss Weeks, quarterback of the first two teams I coached here. Weeks was the leader without reproach. He drove two Michigan teams to a total of 1,211 points against 12. Had he told either team to charge a stone wall, it would have done so, I believe, so much did the teams believe in him."

In addition to his talent at football, Weeks was reported to have been "a clever student," a member of the Delta Chi fraternity, and one of the most popular students on the campus.

== Coaching and other post-collegiate activities ==
After graduating from Michigan in 1903, the 23-year-old Weeks was hired as the head football coach at the University of Kansas. He coached only one year at Kansas, earning a salary of $1,200. The 1903 Jayhawks football team had a record of 6–3 under Weeks, ranking Weeks tenth in Kansas football history in terms of winning percentage. Weeks also worked for a time for a large construction company.

== Death ==
In late 1905 or early 1906, Weeks contracted either diphtheria or typhoid fever, was ill for several weeks, and spent a month in hospital in a Washington, D.C. He died at the hospital on February 25, 1906, at age 26. In March 1906, The Washington Post reported that Michigan students were mourning the loss of Weeks who was "considered the greatest field general that Michigan ever had, and was immensely popular with the students at that institution." Ten years after Weeks' death, Coach Yost said: "Boss Weeks' two teams scored more than 1200 points. If that team had been in front of the Chinese Wall and got the signal to go, not a man would have hesitated. Every man that played under Boss Weeks idolized him, and when word was brought to the university that he had died, every Michigan man felt that its university had lost one of its greatest men." He was laid to rest in Oakwood Cemetery, Allegan, Michigan next to his mother's eventual grave site near his father's grave.

== Head coaching record ==
| Year | Team | Overall | Conference | Standing | Bowl/playoffs |
|---|---|---|---|---|---|
Kansas Jayhawks (Independent) (1903)
| 1903 | Kansas | 6–3 | | | |
| Kansas: | | 6–3 | | | |
Beloit (Independent) (1904)
| 1904 | Beloit | 5–5–1 | | | |
| Beloit: | | 5–5–1 | | | |
| Total: | | 11–8–1 | | | |
