= Joe Maddock (coach) =

American football player and coach (1877–1943)

Joseph Maddock
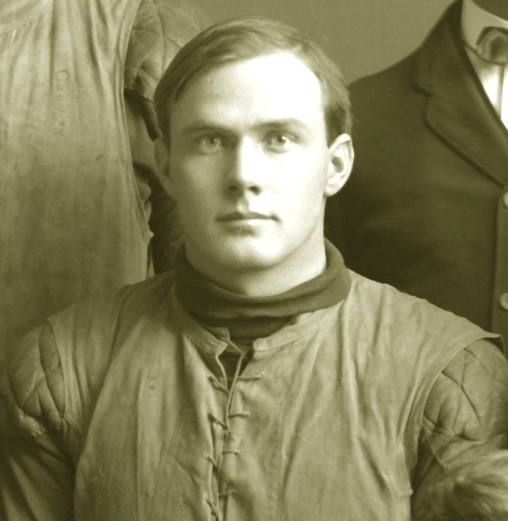

Biographical details
- Born: July 11, 1877; East Jordan, Michigan, U.S.
- Died: November 11, 1943 (aged 66); Salt Lake City, Utah, U.S.

Playing career

Football
- 1901: Albion
- 1902–1903: Michigan
- Position: Tackle

Coaching career (HC unless noted)

Football
- 1904–1909: Utah
- 1924: Oregon

Baseball
- 1905–1909: Utah

Head coaching record
- Overall: 32–12–3 (football); 19–17 (baseball)

Accomplishments and honors

Championships
- 2× National (1902, 1903)

Awards
- Second-team All-American (1903); 2× First-team All-Western (1902, 1903)

Joseph Herbert Maddock (July 11, 1877 – November 11, 1943) was an American college football player and coach. He was an All-Western tackle for the University of Michigan's "Point-a-Minute" football teams in 1902 and 1903. He also set a Western Conference record in the hammer throw. He later served as a head football coach at the University of Utah, where he compiled a record of 28–9–1 between 1904 and 1909.

== Biography ==
=== Athlete ===
Maddock was born in East Jordan, Michigan and began his collegiate career at Albion College. In 1901, the 24-year-old Maddock played for Albion football coach Chester Brewer who taught him the "Wisconsin style of tackle play." Maddock was so effective against the University of Michigan in 1901 that Coach Fielding H. Yost enticed him to transfer to Michigan. He became a star for Yost's "Point-a-Minute" teams in 1902 and 1903.

He played tackle and punter at the University of Michigan on Fielding H. Yost's "Point-a-Minute" teams. Though he was a lineman, Maddock was also used as a ball carrier in short-yardage situations. As reported by The New York Times, the Wolverines used "big Joe Maddock, the sturdy right tackle, for first downs when a few yards were needed." In Michigan's 1903 victory over Minnesota, Maddock, and Willie Heston were the Wolverines's biggest ground gainers. After the game, Coach Yost told reporters, "They would not be stopped by ordinary tackles nor by less than three or four Minnesota men, who sometimes had to sit on them to stop them at all."

Maddock gained extensive attention for his role in Michigan's 1903 win over Wisconsin by a score of 16–0. Maddock played at four different positions in the game leading one newspaper to report:

"The great surprise, however, is that the famous Maddock, right tackle, will today play four positions, tackle, half, full back and quarterback. Michigan has a series of new plays in which Maddock's multiple duties are possible. On defense, he will play tackle: when Wisconsin's line is to be bucked, Maddock will be full-back in plays whose exact nature is a secret."

Maddock was selected as a first-team All-Western player in both 1902 and 1903. He was a unanimous All-Western pick in 1903.

Maddock was also a champion wrestler and member of the University of Michigan track team. In May 1903, he broke the Western Intercollegiate hammer throw record with a throw of 141 feet, five inches.

=== Coach ===
Coach Maddock from the 1909 University of Utah yearbook

Maddock later became a successful coach at the University of Utah and University of Oregon. In 1904, he was hired as the head football, basketball, and track coach at the University of Utah, based on the recommendation of his former coach Brewer. When Maddock was hired in September 1904, a Salt Lake City newspaper reported that the team hoped to see some "Yost" style football:

"Utah is to see some real 'Yost' football this year. Maddock comes fresh from Ann Arbor, where for the past four years he has been studying gridiron tactics under the direction of the peerless 'Hurry-Up' Yost, who has placed Michigan at the top of the football heap. Maddock certainly understands the Michigan 'system,' and with fair material tho University ought to have a team this season that will trim anything in the intermountain country."

From 1904 to 1909, he led Utah to a 36–9–1 record. In 1905, a newspaper reported that Maddock is the "whole goods" at Utah:

"He has the Mormons all football crazy. He has written here to say that his team now holds the championship of Utah, Montana, Wyoming 'and the greater part of Colorado. When he won the hard-fought battle with Colorado College a week ago the Salt Lake City papers said: 'Maddock is a now way of saying success. The great Michigan tackle has taken boys who never saw a football before and made them the star players of the Rocky Mountain States."

Student spirit at Utah became so enthusiastic while Maddock was the coach that a song was written dedicated to Maddock and his team for their sportsmanship and football play. A player for Maddock's Utah teams later recalled the coach's advice to his team as "backs—keep your knees up and elbows out, and linemen—get lower and lower even if your noses rub in the grass."

After retiring from coaching in 1910, Maddock moved to Idaho, where he went into business in Mackay. Later he moved to Idaho Falls, Idaho and coached the football team there for several years.

Maddock returned to the profession in 1920 and 1921 as an assistant coach under Fielding Yost at Michigan. He returned to Idaho Falls where he went into business and served as a volunteer coach at the local high school. In February 1924, he was hired as the head football coach at the University of Oregon. Fielding Yost recommended him for the job, telling the Oregon athletic director, "Maddock is one of the greatest tackles that I have ever known. I consider him an excellent football coach with fine enthusiasm and personality." Maddock coached the Ducks to a 4–3–2 record in his one season as head coach. In January 1925, Maddock resigned his position at Oregon. The university asked him to devote his entire time to athletics, but Maddock declined. Maddock operated three stores in Idaho and indicated that a full-time position would be too great a sacrifice to his business.

In his seven years as a head football coach, Maddock never had a losing season.

=== Later years ===
After returning to Idaho, he coached the Idaho Falls High School football team until 1934. In 1934, he moved to Parker, Idaho where he was in the grocery business until his death in 1943.

In November 1943, Maddock died at age 66 of a lung ailment after two months in a Salt Lake City hospital. He was survived by his wife Bennetia Maddock and his son Joe Jr.

== Head coaching record ==
Year	Team	Overall	Conference	Standing	Bowl/playoffs
Utah (Independent) (1904–1909)
1904	Utah	7–1			
1905	Utah	6–2			
1906	Utah	4–1			
1907	Utah	4–2			
1908	Utah	3–2–1			
1909	Utah	4–1			
Utah:		28–9–1			
Oregon Webfoots (Northwest Conference / Pacific Coast Conference) (1924)
1924	Oregon	4–3–2	4–1–2 / 2–2–1	4th / 6th	
Oregon:		4–3–2	4–2–2		
Total:		32–12–3			
