= Minnesota Golden Gophers football under Henry L. Williams =

American college football seasons, 1900–1921

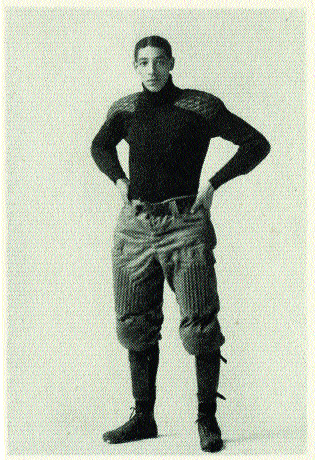
Former Gopher Bobby Marshall in 1905

Henry L. Williams was the head football coach at the University of Minnesota for 22 seasons, from 1900 through 1921. The team had a 136-33-11 overall record. In the Big Ten, the Golden Gophers had a 50-25-5 record and won 8 conference championships. Thirteen players were awarded All-American status. Thirty-one players were named All-Big Ten first team.
