= George W. Gregory =

American football player, coach, and lawyer (1879–1946)

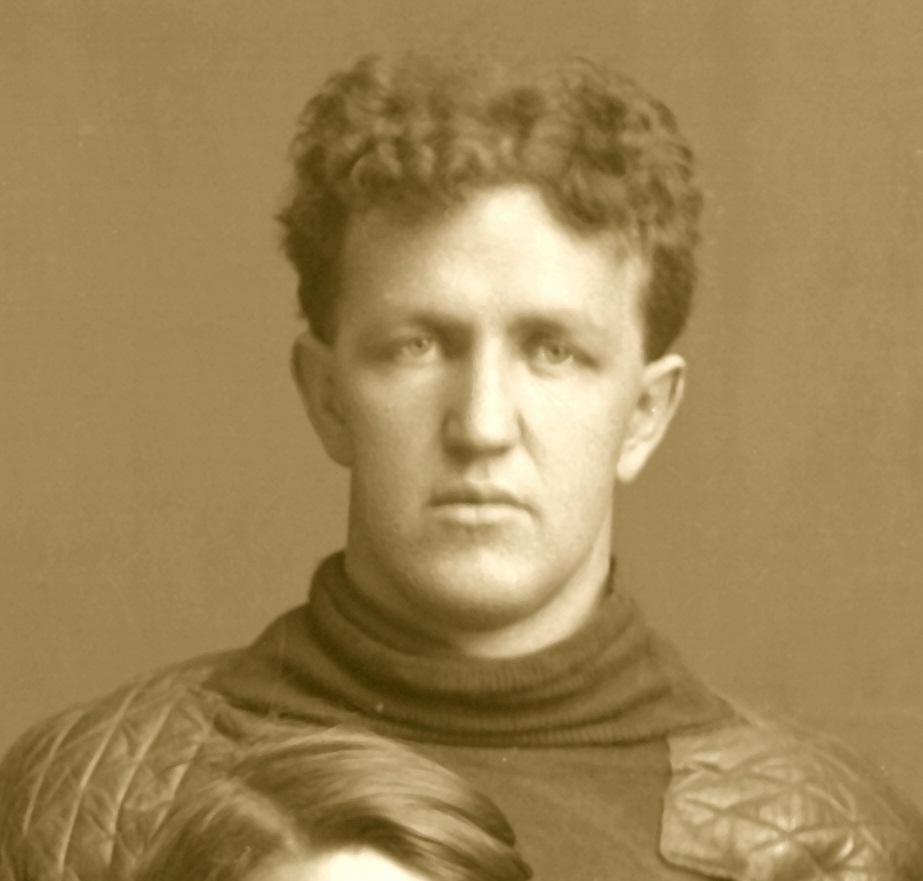
- Gregory cropped from 1902 Michigan football team portrait

Biographical details
- Born: April 19, 1879; Placer County, California, U.S.
- Died: September 6, 1946 (aged 67); Pierce County, Washington, U.S.

Playing career
- 1900: Stanford
- 1901–1903: Michigan
- Position: Center

Coaching career (HC unless noted)
- 1905: Kenyon

Head coaching record
- Overall: 5–5

George W. "Dad" Gregory (April 19, 1879– September 6, 1946) was an American college football player, coach and lawyer. He was the starting center for the University of Michigan's "Point-a-Minute" football teams of 1901, 1902 and 1903. He was the only player to start all 22 games for the 1901 and 1902 teams that compiled a record of 22-0 and outscored opponents 1,194 to 12. Michigan's football team was recognized as national champions for each of the three years in which Gregory was the starting center. After receiving his law degree from Michigan, Gregory moved to Seattle, Washington, where he was one of the founders of the Karr & Gregory law firm. He also served as the head football coach at Kenyon College during the 1905 football season.

== Early years ==
Gregory was born in California in May 1879. His father, Nathan Gregory, was an Indiana native and an engineer. His mother, Marietta Gregory, was also an Indiana native. At the time of the 1880 United States census, Gregory at age one was living in Lincoln, Placer County, California with his parents and three older sisters, Alameda, Cora and Louise.

In 1900, Gregory was living in Redding, California with his uncle, George Groves, who was a hotel-keeper. Gregory worked as a clerk in his uncle's hotel.

In 1900, Gregory enrolled at Stanford University as a law student. While at Stanford, he played football under head coach Fielding H. Yost in the fall of 1900. In 1901, Coach Yost accepted the position as head football coach at the University of Michigan. Pressure was placed on Gregory to remain at Stanford, but he opted to move east with Coach Yost.

== University of Michigan ==
In 1901, Gregory enrolled in law school at the University of Michigan, receiving his law degree in 1904. While attending law school, he played college football as the starting center for Yost"s "Point-a-Minute" football teams. During Gregory's three years as the starting center, the team compiled a record of 33–0–1, outscored opponents 1,759 to 18, and has been recognized as a national championship team all three years. Gregory started 32 games at center for Michigan as follows:

- Gregory started all 11 games for the 1901 Michigan Wolverines football team that finished the season undefeated with an 11–0 record, outscored their opponents by a combined total of 550 to 0 and defeated Stanford, 49–0, in the 1902 Rose Bowl, the first college football bowl game ever played. The team has been recognized as national champions by the Helms Athletic Foundation, the Houlgate System, and the National Championship Foundation.
- Gregory also started all 11 games for the 1902 Michigan Wolverines football team that finished the season undefeated with an 11–0 record, outscored opponents by a combined 644 to 12, and became known as the second of Yost's famed "Point-a-Minute" teams. The 1902 team has been recognized as national champions by the Billingsley Report, Helms Athletic Foundation, Houlgate System, National Championship Foundation and Parke H. Davis. Gregory was the only player to start all 22 games for Michigan's 1901 and 1902 national championship teams.
- Gregory started 10 of the 12 games played by the 1903 Michigan Wolverines football team that compiled a record of 11–0–1 and outscored its opponents 565–6. The 1903 team has been recognized as national champions by the National Championship Foundation.

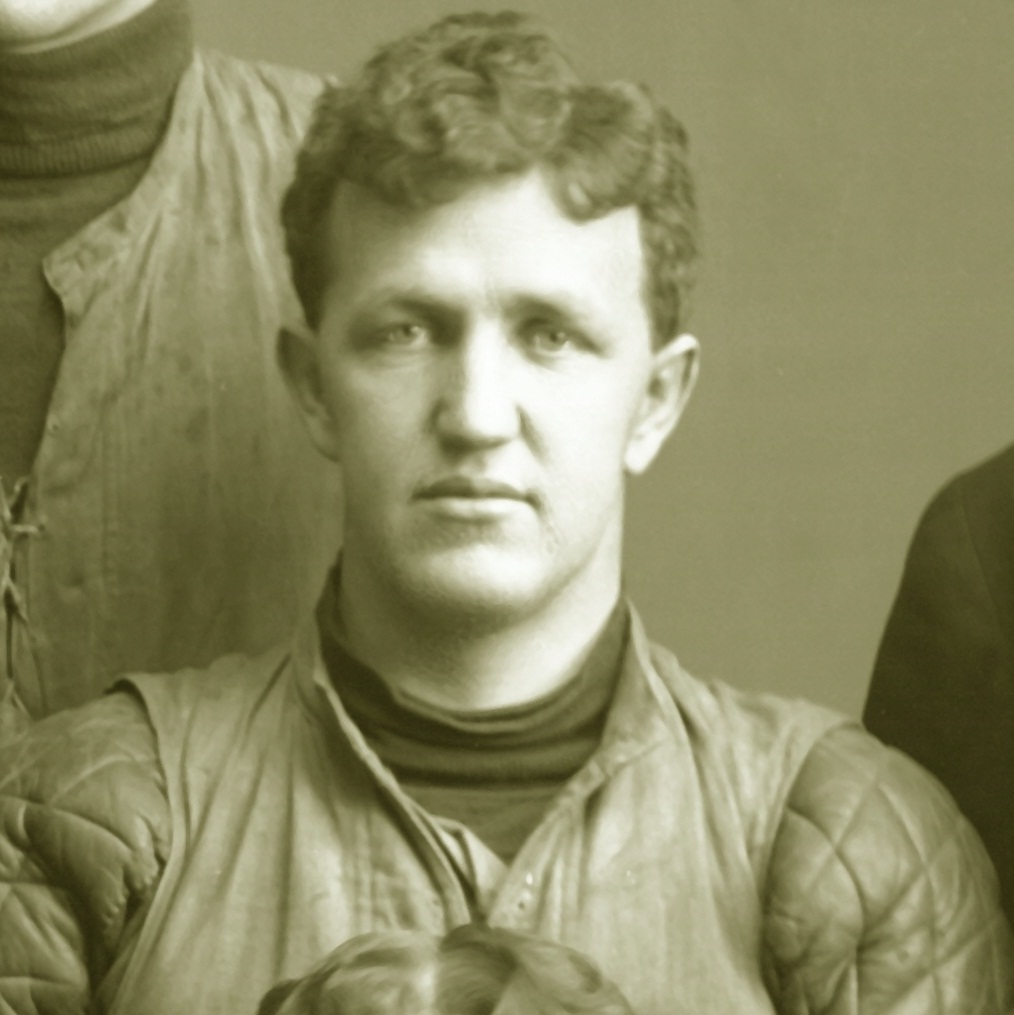
Gregory in 1903

During a 128–0 victory over Buffalo in 1901, Gregory reportedly asked for an opportunity to run the ball for a touchdown. In his history of the Michigan football program, Jim Cnockaert described the incident as follows:

"Dad Gregory, the team's center, complained at one point that everyone on the team had scored a touchdown in the game except him. Later, as the Wolverines closed in again on the goal line, [Boss] Weeks signaled for Gregory to line up in the backfield and promised to hand him the ball. Gregory plowed through the line and dove into the end zone, yelling, 'I'm over! I'm over!' However, Weeks played a trick on the play, pulling the ball away at the last second so that Gregory was not awarded the touchdown."

A profile of Gregory in the 1903 University of Michigan yearbook noted:

"While not an exceptionally heavy man, his build attracted early in the fall of 1901 ... Yost tried him at center and he developed rapidly. His weight is low down, giving him stability for that position. ... In nearly all the games of the past two seasons he has played against men who have outweighed him, but he has never failed to hold his own. He is aggressive from the start of the game to the call of time, but his aggressiveness never occasions any undue roughness. ... He is hard and muscular and his build is well adapted to any kind of heavy athletic work. Perhaps the greatest thing about Gregory is his accuracy in passing the ball. He keeps his head well and never allows anxiety or excitement to cause a bad pass. Whether it is the short pass to the quarterback or the long one to the fullback he is absolutely sure. ... Gregory and Ellsworth of Chicago divided honors for the All-Western eleven this year, but there is a disposition among Michigan students, however, to consider Gregory as the superior of any Western center."

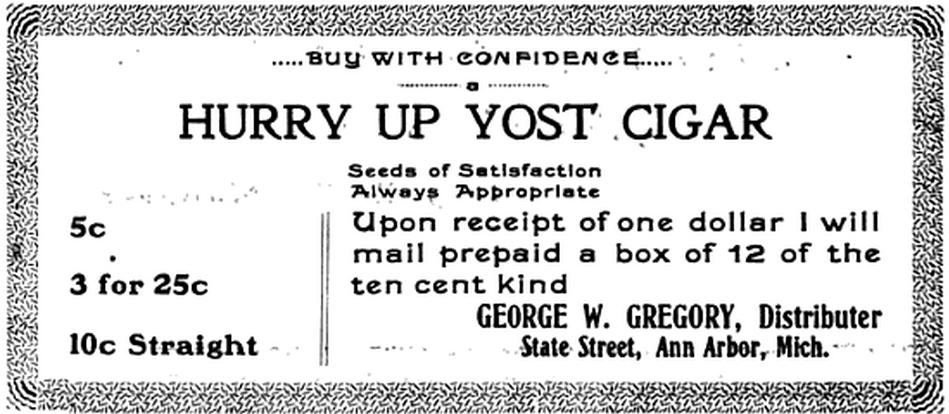
Advertisement for Hurry Up Yost Cigars, Geo. W. Gregory, Distributor

Prior to the start of the 1903 season, press reports indicated that Gregory and halfback Willie Heston, both of whom had come to Michigan from California with Coach Yost in 1901, might not return to the team. The Detroit Free Press reported in early September 1903 that there was "a business chance beckoning rather strongly to both" and that the players were rumored to be in Detroit to meet with Coach Yost. In 1903, Gregory was identified as the distributor of "Hurry Up Yost Cigars" in advertising published in various University of Michigan publications.

Gregory was also a member of the Delta Chi fraternity at Michigan.

== Football coach ==
In 1905, Gregory served as the head football coach at Kenyon College in Ohio. One publication noted: "The College has secured as football coach 'Dad' Gregory, of the University of Michigan. He is a pupil of Yost's and teaches the latter's system here. A squad consisting of much better material and more of it than for years past is what Gregory has to work with. His tactics, though strict, are very well liked by the team, and the best possible work from all the men is the result." In his one season as the head coach at Kenyon, Gregory led the team to a 5–5 record. Highlights of the season included a 30–0 victory over Mt. Union and a 20–0 victory over Ohio Wesleyan.

== David Starr Jordan controversy ==
On December 25, 1907, Stanford president David Starr Jordan wrote a letter to Sydney Peixotto, president of the Pacific Athletic Association, criticizing Coach Yost, who left Stanford for Michigan in 1901 and returned to the West Coast to defeat Stanford 49–0 in the 1902 Rose Bowl. Jordan focused some of his attacks on Gregory, who had been a Stanford student and football player in 1900. Jordan's letter was published in the Los Angeles Times under the headline, "Jordan's Information Peddled Second-Hand," and in The New York Times under the headline, "Dr. Jordan Picks a New Victim." In the letter, Jordan accused Gregory of having accepted money to play football at Michigan and of having flunked out of Stanford. Jordan stated:

"I referred to [Ralph] Rose's career at Michigan with that of Gregory and [Willie] Heston as illustrating the irregularities which were among the evils of football. Gregory, for example, was a special student – that is, one who had not passed the entrance examinations at Stanford. He was not allowed to play in any of the intercollegiate games, and, failing in his work, was dropped at Christmas. He went to Washburn School to make good his entrance requirements. While there an offer of $1,500 a year to begin with came from Yost through a local agent. Gregory accepted and went to Michigan, played a dozen or more games a year, and was graduated with his class – a singular fact in connection with his failure at Stanford. In going to Michigan he took with him no credits and no honorable dismissal."

In a public response, Gregory angrily denied Jordan's allegations. Gregory stated:

"I am tired of having David Starr Jordan ... brand me as a tramp athlete. I shall have to give him the lie when he says that I was offered $1500 by an agent of Coach Yost to enter Michigan. I neither received an offer direct or indirect from Yost nor any agent. I went to Michigan because several lawyers in my native town were graduates of that university and I always liked the place. I do not regret my choice. If President Jordan will talk facts rather than trash, he will change his attitude on my standing in college, so far as Michigan is concerned. At Stanford I was only a special and I do not deny that my work was not of a high order. At Michigan I never flunked during my entire course, and what the conditions were against me when I entered I made up by working hard in summer school. ... I owe it to Michigan and athletics in general to state definitely that I did not receive one cent in connection with athletics while I was in Michigan."

Gregory also noted that Jordan was wrong in stating that he had not been allowed to play in intercollegiate football games at Stanford, noting that he had played in a game against Nevada. With respect to the claim of having been pressured to enter Michigan, Gregory added: "More pressure was brought to bear on me to re-enter Stanford than was ever used to make me enter Michigan."

== Law practice in Seattle ==
After graduating from Michigan, Gregory moved to Seattle where he began a law practice. In 1905, he also served as the coach of a football team in Seattle.

At the time of the 1910, 1920, and 1930 United States censuses, Gregory was living in Seattle with his wife, Kate. His occupation was listed as a lawyer in general practice. They had a son, George W. Gregory Jr., in approximately 1912. In a draft registration card completed during World War I, Gregory identified himself as a lawyer in business for himself with an office at 911 American Bank Building in Seattle. He was one of the founders of the Seattle law firm of Karr & Gregory.

In 1929, Gregory ran for a seat in the Washington State Senate from the 37th District.

Gregory died at Pierce County, Washington, in September 1946.

== Head coaching record ==
Year	Team	Overall	Conference	Standing	Bowl/playoffs
Kenyon Lords (Ohio Athletic Conference) (1905)
1905	Kenyon	5–5	1–3	T–5th	
Kenyon:		5–5	1–3		
Total:		5–5			
