= Paul Jones (judge) =

American judge

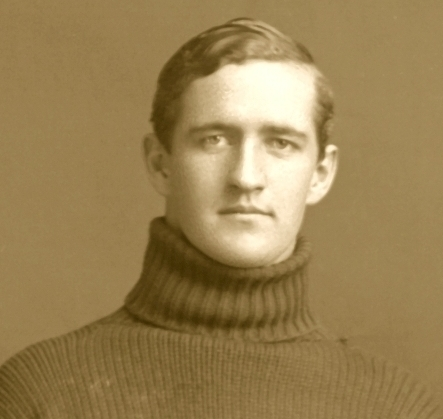
- Jones cropped from 1902 Michigan team photo

Chief Judge of the United States District Court for the Northern District of Ohio
- In office 1948–1959
- Preceded by: Office established
- Succeeded by: Frank Le Blond Kloeb

Judge of the United States District Court for the Northern District of Ohio
- In office March 2, 1923 – August 4, 1965
- Appointed by: Warren G. Harding
- Preceded by: Seat established by 42 Stat. 837
- Succeeded by: William Kernahan Thomas

Personal details
- Born: Paul J. Jones; November 4, 1880 Youngstown, Ohio, U.S.
- Died: August 4, 1965 (aged 84) Shaker Heights, Ohio, U.S.
- Education: University of Michigan Law School (LL.B.)
- Coaching career

Playing career
- 1901–1903: Michigan
- Position: Fullback

Coaching career (HC unless noted)
- 1904–1905: Western Reserve

Head coaching record
- Overall: 10–5–3

Accomplishments and honors

Championships
- 3× National (1901, 1902, 1903)

Paul J. Jones (November 4, 1880 – August 4, 1965) was an American college football player and coach and United States federal judge. He played fullback for the University of Michigan's national championship football team in 1902 and became the football coach at Western Reserve University after graduating from Michigan. He practiced law from 1905 to 1920 and served as an Ohio state court judge from 1920 to 1923. In 1923, he was appointed as a United States district judge of the United States District Court for the Northern District of Ohio in Cleveland, a position he held until his death in 1965.

== Early years and football career ==
Born in Youngstown, Ohio, Jones attended the University of Michigan where he studied law and also played football. Jones worked in a Youngstown boiler shop for five cents an hour during his summer vacations. He was the starting fullback on Fielding H. Yost's 1902 "Point-a-Minute" football team that finished the season 11–0 and outscored opponents 644 to 12. After the 1901 season, one account read "His work at fullback has been exceptionally good, and he is regarded as the most available man for that position next year." Jones was a popular player, and in October 1902 newspaper accounts reported that he led the students in singing the "varsity yell" at a "singing bee" preceding the football game against Wisconsin. Jones was six-feet tall and weighed 170 pounds as Michigan's fullback in 1902. After being a starter on the 1902 Michigan Wolverines football team, Jones contracted typhoid fever and was unable to play in 1903. In March 1903, Jones left the university for a year to recuperate from the effects of typhoid fever. Jones received a Bachelor of Laws from the University of Michigan Law School in 1904. Jones was admitted to the Ohio bar in 1904, but after graduating from Michigan, he was hired as the head football coach at Western Reserve University in Cleveland, Ohio.

== Head coaching record ==
Year	Team	Overall	Conference	Standing	Bowl/playoffs
Western Reserve (Ohio Athletic Conference) (1904–1905)
1904	Western Reserve	4–2–3	1–1–1	T–3rd	
1905	Western Reserve	6–3	1–2	4th	
Western Reserve:		10–5–3	2–3–1		
Total:		10–5–3			

== Career ==
Jones entered the private practice of law in Youngstown in 1905. He was a Referee in Bankruptcy for the United States District Court for the Northern District of Ohio from 1912 to 1916. Jones was appointed Youngstown city attorney, a position he held from 1916 to 1920. He also ran for Mayor of Youngstown, an election he lost by 400 votes. In 1920, he was elected as a Court of Common Pleas Judge for Mahoning County, Ohio, serving in that role from 1920 to 1923.

== Federal judicial service ==
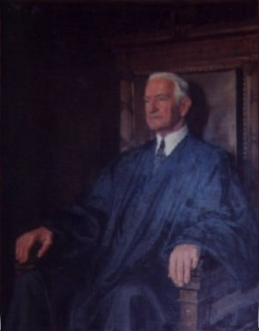
Judicial portrait of Jones, 1956, by John W. Teyral.

Jones was nominated by President Warren G. Harding to the United States District Court for the Northern District of Ohio on February 28, 1923, to a new seat created by 42 Stat. 837. Confirmed by the United States Senate on March 2, 1923, he received his commission the same day. He served as Chief Judge from 1948 to 1959, as a member of the Judicial Conference of the United States from 1958 to 1960, and remained on the court until his death on August 4, 1965. At the time of his death at age 84, Jones was the country's oldest active district court judge and the last federal judge in active service appointed by President Harding. He had announced plans to retire on November 4, 1965, on his 85th birthday due to illness. He died at his home in Shaker Heights, Ohio.

=== Notable cases and judicial philosophy ===
Jones developed a reputation for his outspoken comments from the bench. In 1932, as Prohibition was being widely blamed with causing the spread of racketeering and organized crime, Judge Jones asserted that the influence of Prohibition on crime was exaggerated. In 1933, Judge Jones gained attention when he sentenced a 46-year-old pregnant mother of ten to 15 days in jail for selling a quart of liquor to federal agents for 50 cents. He refused the woman's plea for leniency, saying: "It is an outrage for this woman to be bringing children into the world when she and her husband cannot support those they already have without breaking the law." As he sentenced her, Judge Jones lectured her on the advantages of birth control, closing his comments by asking, "Doesn't this woman know how to stop it?"

In 1934, he criticized "windy lawyers" for their "briefs of Voltairian proportions" which "unduly burden the court and tire it out."

Jones gained national attention in 1946 when he ruled that rent control laws were unconstitutional. He held that, while rent control may have been permissible during the wartime emergency, Congress lacked the power to continue the restrictions "when peace has returned in fact."

In 1947, the NEA wire service ran a feature article about Judge Jones and his rent control decision in which it observed:

If you either own or rent an apartment, you either love or hate Federal Judge Paul Jones. Judge Jones, of the Northern Ohio District Court, handed down the ruling that the rent law is unconstitutional. If sustained by higher courts, his decision means, simply, that all rent controls are over and done for, that landlords can charge all the traffic will bear and that tenants can pay or get out.

Jones' ruling was later reversed by the United States Supreme Court. Jones continued to contend that his ruling had been correct.

== Personal ==
Jones was married to Caroline Bonnell, a survivor of the sinking of the Titanic, in 1912. They had a son, Paul Jones Jr., and a daughter, Mrs. Mary Chilcote.

== See also ==
- List of United States federal judges by longevity of service

Legal offices
Preceded by Seat established by 42 Stat. 837	Judge of the United States District Court for the Northern District of Ohio; 1923–1965	Succeeded by William Kernahan Thomas
Preceded by Office established	Chief Judge of the United States District Court for the Northern District of Ohio; 1948–1959	Succeeded by Frank Le Blond Kloeb
