= Sigmund Harris =

American football player and coach (1883–1964)

Sig Harris

Biographical details
- Born: July 2, 1883; Dubuque, Iowa, U.S.
- Died: November 8, 1964 (aged 81)

Playing career
- 1902–1904: Minnesota
- Position: Quarterback

Coaching career (HC unless noted)
- 1905–1920: Minnesota (assistant)
- 1936–1941: Minnesota (assistant)

Accomplishments and honors

Championships
- 3 National

Awards
- 2× Third-team All-American (1903, 1904)

Sigmund "Sig" Harris (July 2, 1883 – November 8, 1964) was an American college football player. He was University of Minnesota's All-American quarterback from 1902 to 1904, for powerful teams under Dr. Henry L. Williams. He played a role in the Little Brown Jug game between Minnesota and Michigan in 1903.

== Early life ==
Born in Dubuque, Iowa, Harris and his family moved to Minneapolis when he was young, where:

I went to Cheder. There was no other organization for Jewish education in those days. I lived some distance from the Jewish population in town. I always felt that I considerably missed Jewish life in not being in closer touch with our people.

He played quarterback for the Minneapolis Central High School football team alongside Bobby Marshall, who played end. Together they led the Minneapolis Central Pioneers football team to state football championship titles in 1899 and 1900. The 1900 season included a disputed 6-0 victory over the University of Minnesota Gophers.

== College ==
Harris began his college career in 1901, when he was enrolled at the College of Engineering and Mechanical Arts at the University of Minnesota. He became the starting quarterback the following year. In the 1903 season, Harris was named first team Fielding H. Yost All-American, third team Walter Camp All-American, and first team Camp All-Western. He was present at the game against the Michigan Wolverines where the Little Brown Jug rivalry began. Harris was named third team Camp All-American in the 1904 season.

== Coaching ==
Harris was an assistant coach from graduation until 1920. He served as a substitute head coach for a game in 1922 when Williams suddenly took ill. He would return to coaching for a brief time, but he was devoted full-time to the machinery business that he founded in 1903 and continued to head until his death in 1964.

== Hall of Fame ==
Harris is a member of the International Jewish Sports Hall of Fame.

== See also ==
- List of select Jewish football players
