= 1907 Rhode Island State football team =

American college football season

1907 Rhode Island State football
- Conference: Independent
- Record: 3–1–2
- Head coach: Marshall Tyler (9th season)

1907 Eastern college football independents records
	Conf.			Overall
Team	W	L	T	W		L		T
Yale		–		9	–	0	–	1
Dartmouth		–		8	–	0	–	1
Penn		–		11	–	1	–	0
Carlisle		–		10	–	1	–	0
Temple		–		4	–	0	–	2
Fordham		–		6	–	1	–	1
Cornell		–		8	–	2	–	0
Western U. of Penn.		–		8	–	2	–	0
Princeton		–		7	–	2	–	0
Washington & Jefferson		–		7	–	2	–	0
Lafayette		–		7	–	2	–	1
Lehigh		–		7	–	2	–	1
Swarthmore		–		6	–	2	–	0
Army		–		6	–	2	–	1
NYU		–		5	–	2	–	0
Vermont		–		4	–	1	–	2
Harvard		–		7	–	3	–	0
Brown		–		7	–	3	–	0
Penn State		–		6	–	4	–	0
Syracuse		–		5	–	3	–	1
Drexel		–		3	–	2	–	2
Colgate		–		4	–	4	–	1
Geneva		–		4	–	5	–	2
Dickinson		–		3	–	4	–	2
Amherst		–		3	–	4	–	1
Tufts		–		3	–	4	–	1
Franklin & Marshall		–		4	–	6	–	0
Rutgers		–		3	–	5	–	1
Springfield Training School		–		2	–	4	–	2
Bucknell		–		4	–	7	–	0
New Hampshire		–		1	–	5	–	2
Villanova		–		1	–	5	–	1
Holy Cross		–		1	–	7	–	2
Wesleyan		–		1	–	7	–	1
Carnegie Tech		–		1	–	8	–	0

The 1907 Rhode Island State football team was an American football team that represented Rhode Island State College (later renamed the University of Rhode Island) as an independent during the 1907 college football season. In its ninth year under head coach Marshall Tyler, the team compiled a 3–1–2 record.

== Schedule ==
Date	Opponent	Site	Result	Source
October 5	at Massachusetts	Alumni Field; Amherst, MA	L 0–11	
October 12	Dean Academy	Kingston, RI	T 0–0	
October 19	at Worcester Tech	Worcester, MA	W 14–0	
November 2	at New Hampshire	Durham, NH	T 6–6	
November 9	St. Andrew's School	Kingston, RI	W 6–0	
November 23	Connecticut	Kingston, RI (rivalry)	W 42–0	
