= 1907 New Hampshire football team =

American college football season

1907 New Hampshire football
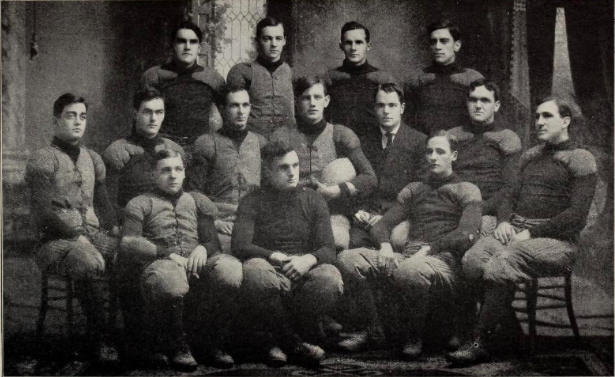
- Team captain Cone is seated in the center of the photo, holding football
- Conference: Independent
- Record: 1–5–2
- Head coach: Edward Herr (2nd season)
- Captain: Charles F. Cone
- Home stadium: College grounds, Durham, NH

1907 Eastern college football independents records
	Conf.			Overall
Team	W	L	T	W		L		T
Yale		–		9	–	0	–	1
Dartmouth		–		8	–	0	–	1
Penn		–		11	–	1	–	0
Carlisle		–		10	–	1	–	0
Temple		–		4	–	0	–	2
Fordham		–		6	–	1	–	1
Cornell		–		8	–	2	–	0
Western U. of Penn.		–		8	–	2	–	0
Princeton		–		7	–	2	–	0
Washington & Jefferson		–		7	–	2	–	0
Lafayette		–		7	–	2	–	1
Lehigh		–		7	–	2	–	1
Swarthmore		–		6	–	2	–	0
Army		–		6	–	2	–	1
NYU		–		5	–	2	–	0
Vermont		–		4	–	1	–	2
Harvard		–		7	–	3	–	0
Brown		–		7	–	3	–	0
Penn State		–		6	–	4	–	0
Syracuse		–		5	–	3	–	1
Drexel		–		3	–	2	–	2
Colgate		–		4	–	4	–	1
Geneva		–		4	–	5	–	2
Dickinson		–		3	–	4	–	2
Amherst		–		3	–	4	–	1
Tufts		–		3	–	4	–	1
Franklin & Marshall		–		4	–	6	–	0
Rutgers		–		3	–	5	–	1
Springfield Training School		–		2	–	4	–	2
Bucknell		–		4	–	7	–	0
New Hampshire		–		1	–	5	–	2
Villanova		–		1	–	5	–	1
Holy Cross		–		1	–	7	–	2
Wesleyan		–		1	–	7	–	1
Carnegie Tech		–		1	–	8	–	0

The 1907 New Hampshire football team (Note: The school did not adopt the Wildcats nickname until February 1926; before then, they were generally referred to as "the blue and white".) was an American football team that represented New Hampshire College of Agriculture and the Mechanic Arts (Note: The school was often referred to as New Hampshire College or New Hampshire State College in newspapers of the era.) during the 1907 college football season—the school became the University of New Hampshire in 1923. Under second-year head coach Edward Herr, (Note: New Hampshire's media guide lists 1905 as Herr's first season as head coach, but this is not corroborated; see discussion at 1905 New Hampshire football team.) the team finished with a record of 1–5–2.

== Schedule ==
Scoring during this era awarded five points for a touchdown, one point for a conversion kick (extra point), and four points for a field goal. Teams played in the one-platoon system, and games were played in two halves rather than four quarters.

Date	Opponent	Site	Result	Attendance	Source
September 21 (Note: Other sources have the Norwich game on September 20; accounts from 1907 are clear it was September 21.)	at Norwich	Northfield, VT	L 0–10		
September 28 (Note: Other sources have the Brown game on September 27; accounts from 1907 are clear it was September 28.)	at Brown	Andrews Field; Providence, RI	L 0–16		
October 5	at Colby	Waterville, ME	T 0–0		
October 9	at Dartmouth	Alumni Oval; Hanover, NH (rivalry)	L 0–10		
October 19	at Bowdoin	Brunswick, ME	W 5–0		
October 26	Bates	Durham, NH	L 0–22		
November 2	Rhode Island State	Durham, NH	T 6–6		
November 9	Vermont	Durham, NH	L 0–34		

The September 21 game was the first meeting between the New Hampshire and Norwich football programs.

New Hampshire's second team (reserves) defeated Berwick Academy in Berwick, Maine, 5–4.

== Roster ==
A team roster published early in the season had 32 names; after the season, 13 players plus the student team manager were awarded varsity letters:

Name	Position	Class	Age	Wt. & Ht.
Arthur M. Batchelder	Quarterback	1908	22	155 / 5'10"
Carl Chase	Center	1909	22	158 / 5'9"
Francis Clough	Team manager	1908		
Charles F. Cone	Halfback	1908	22	170 / 6'1"
Roland B. Hammond	Tackle	1909	20	185 / 5'9"
Merritt C. Huse	Guard	1908	22	178 / 6'1"
James M. Leonard	End	1910	19	150 / 5'8 1/2"
Frederick R. McGrail (Note: First name listed as "Frederic" in The Granite yearbook.)	Guard	1910	19	182 / 5'8"
John J. O'Connor	Tackle	1908	21	168 / 6'1"
Benjamin F. Proud	Halfback	1911	21	167 / 5'10"
Edson D. Sanborn	Halfback	1909	20	162 / 5'4"
Moses H. Sanborn	End	1908	24	158 / 5'10"
George L. Waite	Fullback	1908	21	160 / 5'11"
Carroll B. Wilkins	Halfback	1909	23	153 / 5'10"

In December 1908, Carl Chase and another student drowned while canoeing in the nearby Great Bay. Edson D. Sanborn later coached the Student Army Training Corps (SATC) personnel of the 1918 New Hampshire football team that competed in place of the varsity.
