= 1907 Syracuse Orangemen football team =

American college football season

1907 Syracuse Orangemen football
- Conference: Independent
- Record: 5–3–1
- Head coach: Frank "Buck" O'Neill (2nd season)
- Captain: Ford Park
- Home stadium: Archbold Stadium

1907 Eastern college football independents records
	Conf.			Overall
Team	W	L	T	W		L		T
Yale		–		9	–	0	–	1
Dartmouth		–		8	–	0	–	1
Penn		–		11	–	1	–	0
Carlisle		–		10	–	1	–	0
Temple		–		4	–	0	–	2
Fordham		–		6	–	1	–	1
Cornell		–		8	–	2	–	0
Western U. of Penn.		–		8	–	2	–	0
Princeton		–		7	–	2	–	0
Washington & Jefferson		–		7	–	2	–	0
Lafayette		–		7	–	2	–	1
Lehigh		–		7	–	2	–	1
Swarthmore		–		6	–	2	–	0
Army		–		6	–	2	–	1
NYU		–		5	–	2	–	0
Vermont		–		4	–	1	–	2
Harvard		–		7	–	3	–	0
Brown		–		7	–	3	–	0
Penn State		–		6	–	4	–	0
Syracuse		–		5	–	3	–	1
Drexel		–		3	–	2	–	2
Colgate		–		4	–	4	–	1
Geneva		–		4	–	5	–	2
Dickinson		–		3	–	4	–	2
Amherst		–		3	–	4	–	1
Tufts		–		3	–	4	–	1
Franklin & Marshall		–		4	–	6	–	0
Rutgers		–		3	–	5	–	1
Springfield Training School		–		2	–	4	–	2
Bucknell		–		4	–	7	–	0
New Hampshire		–		1	–	5	–	2
Villanova		–		1	–	5	–	1
Holy Cross		–		1	–	7	–	2
Wesleyan		–		1	–	7	–	1
Carnegie Tech		–		1	–	8	–	0

The 1907 Syracuse Orangemen football team represented Syracuse University as an independent during the 1907 college football season. The head coach was Frank "Buck" O'Neill, coaching his second season with the Orangemen.

This was the first year the team played their home games at the on-campus Archbold Stadium. The 20,000-seat venue was one of the finest facilities of its time and was once called the "Eighth Wonder of the World". The football program notched its 100th victory against Hamilton on October 26. Bill Horr became Syracuse's first All-American when he was named to Walter Camp's "Second Eleven."

== Schedule ==
Date	Opponent	Site	Result	Attendance	Source
September 25	Hobart	Archbold Stadium; Syracuse, NY	W 28–0	2,000	
September 28	Rochester	Archbold Stadium; Syracuse, NY	W 40–6		
October 5	at Yale	Yale Field; New Haven, CT	L 0–11		
October 12	vs. Carlisle	Olympic Park; Buffalo, NY	L 6–14	12,000	
October 19	Williams	Archbold Stadium; Syracuse, NY	W 9–0	6,000	
October 26	Hamilton	Archbold Stadium; Syracuse, NY	W 22–0		
November 2	Bucknell	Archbold Stadium; Syracuse, NY	W 20–6		
November 16	Lafayette	Archbold Stadium; Syracuse, NY	T 4–4		
November 23	at Army	The Plain; West Point, NY	L 4–23		
