= 1907 Drexel Dragons football team =

American college football season

1907 Drexel Dragons football
- Conference: Independent
- Record: 3–2–2
- Head coach: None

1907 Eastern college football independents records
	Conf.			Overall
Team	W	L	T	W		L		T
Yale		–		9	–	0	–	1
Dartmouth		–		8	–	0	–	1
Penn		–		11	–	1	–	0
Carlisle		–		10	–	1	–	0
Temple		–		4	–	0	–	2
Fordham		–		6	–	1	–	1
Cornell		–		8	–	2	–	0
Western U. of Penn.		–		8	–	2	–	0
Princeton		–		7	–	2	–	0
Washington & Jefferson		–		7	–	2	–	0
Lafayette		–		7	–	2	–	1
Lehigh		–		7	–	2	–	1
Swarthmore		–		6	–	2	–	0
Army		–		6	–	2	–	1
NYU		–		5	–	2	–	0
Vermont		–		4	–	1	–	2
Harvard		–		7	–	3	–	0
Brown		–		7	–	3	–	0
Penn State		–		6	–	4	–	0
Syracuse		–		5	–	3	–	1
Drexel		–		3	–	2	–	2
Colgate		–		4	–	4	–	1
Geneva		–		4	–	5	–	2
Dickinson		–		3	–	4	–	2
Amherst		–		3	–	4	–	1
Tufts		–		3	–	4	–	1
Franklin & Marshall		–		4	–	6	–	0
Rutgers		–		3	–	5	–	1
Springfield Training School		–		2	–	4	–	2
Bucknell		–		4	–	7	–	0
New Hampshire		–		1	–	5	–	2
Villanova		–		1	–	5	–	1
Holy Cross		–		1	–	7	–	2
Wesleyan		–		1	–	7	–	1
Carnegie Tech		–		1	–	8	–	0

The 1907 Drexel Dragons football team did not have a head coach.

== Schedule ==
Date	Opponent	Site	Result
October 4	at William Penn Charter School	Queen Lane; Philadelphia, PA	T 0–0
October 9	Northeast Manual Training School	Philadelphia, PA	L 5–6
October 12	at Tome School	Port Deposit, MD	L 0–29
November 8	at Pennsylvania School for the Deaf	Mount Airy; Philadelphiam, PA	W 15–0
November 9	Pennsylvania Military	Chester, PA	W 5–0
Unknown	Atlantic City High School		T 5–5
Unknown	Delaware Valley (PA)		W 5–0

== Roster ==
1907 Drexel Dragons football team roster
Players
Coaches
Offense

Pos.	#	Name	Class
TE		Holden
OT		McClaine
G		Nicholson
C		Todd
RG		Caine
OT		Klough
TE		Knox
QB		Gugler
HB		Cook
HB		Fenton
FB		Hempel

Defense

Pos.	#	Name	Class

Special teams

Pos.	#	Name	Class

Head coach

Coordinators/assistant coaches

Legend

- (C) Team captain
- (S) Suspended
- (I) Ineligible
- Injured
- Redshirt

Roster
Last update: 12 February 2018
