= 1907 Swarthmore Quakers football team =

American college football season

1907 Swarthmore Quakers football
- Conference: Independent
- Record: 6–2
- Head coach: George H. Brooke (9th season)
- Home stadium: Whittier Field

1907 Eastern college football independents records
	Conf.			Overall
Team	W	L	T	W		L		T
Yale		–		9	–	0	–	1
Dartmouth		–		8	–	0	–	1
Penn		–		11	–	1	–	0
Carlisle		–		10	–	1	–	0
Temple		–		4	–	0	–	2
Fordham		–		6	–	1	–	1
Cornell		–		8	–	2	–	0
Western U. of Penn.		–		8	–	2	–	0
Princeton		–		7	–	2	–	0
Washington & Jefferson		–		7	–	2	–	0
Lafayette		–		7	–	2	–	1
Lehigh		–		7	–	2	–	1
Swarthmore		–		6	–	2	–	0
Army		–		6	–	2	–	1
NYU		–		5	–	2	–	0
Vermont		–		4	–	1	–	2
Harvard		–		7	–	3	–	0
Brown		–		7	–	3	–	0
Penn State		–		6	–	4	–	0
Syracuse		–		5	–	3	–	1
Drexel		–		3	–	2	–	2
Colgate		–		4	–	4	–	1
Geneva		–		4	–	5	–	2
Dickinson		–		3	–	4	–	2
Amherst		–		3	–	4	–	1
Tufts		–		3	–	4	–	1
Franklin & Marshall		–		4	–	6	–	0
Rutgers		–		3	–	5	–	1
Springfield Training School		–		2	–	4	–	2
Bucknell		–		4	–	7	–	0
New Hampshire		–		1	–	5	–	2
Villanova		–		1	–	5	–	1
Holy Cross		–		1	–	7	–	2
Wesleyan		–		1	–	7	–	1
Carnegie Tech		–		1	–	8	–	0

The 1907 Swarthmore Quakers football team was an American football team that represented Swarthmore College as an independent during the 1907 college football season. The team compiled a 6–2 record and outscored opponents by a total of 150 to 53. George H. Brooke was the head coach.

== Schedule ==
Date	Opponent	Site	Result	Source
October 5	Rutgers	Whittier Field; Swarthmore, PA	W 29–5	
October 12	at Penn	Franklin Field; Philadelphia, PA	L 8–16	
October 19	George Washington	Whittier Field; Swarthmore, PA	W 30–0	
October 26	Gettysburg	Whittier Field; Swarthmore, PA	W 12–0	
November 2	Villanova	Whittier Field; Swarthmore, PA	W 18–10	
November 9	at Navy	Worden Field; Annapolis, MD	W 18–0	
November 16	at Cornell	Percy Field; Ithaca, NY	L 0–18	
November 23	Bucknell	Whittier Field; Swarthmore, PA	W 35–4	
