= 1907 Franklin & Marshall Nevonians football team =

American college football season

1907 Franklin & Marshall Nevonians football
- Conference: Independent
- Record: 4–6
- Head coach: Vere Triechler (1st season)
- Captain: John Lentz
- Home stadium: Williamson Field

1907 Eastern college football independents records
	Conf.			Overall
Team	W	L	T	W		L		T
Yale		–		9	–	0	–	1
Dartmouth		–		8	–	0	–	1
Penn		–		11	–	1	–	0
Carlisle		–		10	–	1	–	0
Temple		–		4	–	0	–	2
Fordham		–		6	–	1	–	1
Cornell		–		8	–	2	–	0
Western U. of Penn.		–		8	–	2	–	0
Princeton		–		7	–	2	–	0
Washington & Jefferson		–		7	–	2	–	0
Lafayette		–		7	–	2	–	1
Lehigh		–		7	–	2	–	1
Swarthmore		–		6	–	2	–	0
Army		–		6	–	2	–	1
NYU		–		5	–	2	–	0
Vermont		–		4	–	1	–	2
Harvard		–		7	–	3	–	0
Brown		–		7	–	3	–	0
Penn State		–		6	–	4	–	0
Syracuse		–		5	–	3	–	1
Drexel		–		3	–	2	–	2
Colgate		–		4	–	4	–	1
Geneva		–		4	–	5	–	2
Dickinson		–		3	–	4	–	2
Amherst		–		3	–	4	–	1
Tufts		–		3	–	4	–	1
Franklin & Marshall		–		4	–	6	–	0
Rutgers		–		3	–	5	–	1
Springfield Training School		–		2	–	4	–	2
Bucknell		–		4	–	7	–	0
New Hampshire		–		1	–	5	–	2
Villanova		–		1	–	5	–	1
Holy Cross		–		1	–	7	–	2
Wesleyan		–		1	–	7	–	1
Carnegie Tech		–		1	–	8	–	0

The 1907 Franklin & Marshall Nevonians football team was an American football team that represented Franklin & Marshall College during the 1907 college football season. The team compiled a 4–6 record. Vere Triechler was the team's head coach.

== Schedule ==
Date	Opponent	Site	Result	Source
October 2	East End Athletic Club	Williamson Field; Lancaster, PA	W 10–0	
October 5	at Army	The Plain; West Point, NY	L 0–23	
October 9	at Penn	Franklin Field; Philadelphia, PA	L 0–57	
October 12	Susquehanna	Williamson Field; Lancaster, PA	W 17–6	
October 19	at Fordham	Fordham Field; Bronx, NY	L 5–57	
October 26	St. John's (MD)	Williamson Field; Lancaster, PA	L 11–16	
November 2	Delaware	Williamson Field; Lancaster, PA	W 28–0	
November 9	Jefferson Medical	Williamson Field; Lancaster, PA	L 6–10	
November 16	at Haverford	Haverford, PA	W 4–0	
November 28	Gettysburg	Williamson Field; Lancaster, PA (rivalry)	L 0–6	
