= 1907 Geneva Covenanters football team =

American college football season

1907 Geneva Covenanters football
- Conference: Independent
- Record: 4–5–2
- Head coach: Arthur McKean (1st season)

1907 Eastern college football independents records
	Conf.			Overall
Team	W	L	T	W		L		T
Yale		–		9	–	0	–	1
Dartmouth		–		8	–	0	–	1
Penn		–		11	–	1	–	0
Carlisle		–		10	–	1	–	0
Temple		–		4	–	0	–	2
Fordham		–		6	–	1	–	1
Cornell		–		8	–	2	–	0
Western U. of Penn.		–		8	–	2	–	0
Princeton		–		7	–	2	–	0
Washington & Jefferson		–		7	–	2	–	0
Lafayette		–		7	–	2	–	1
Lehigh		–		7	–	2	–	1
Swarthmore		–		6	–	2	–	0
Army		–		6	–	2	–	1
NYU		–		5	–	2	–	0
Vermont		–		4	–	1	–	2
Harvard		–		7	–	3	–	0
Brown		–		7	–	3	–	0
Penn State		–		6	–	4	–	0
Syracuse		–		5	–	3	–	1
Drexel		–		3	–	2	–	2
Colgate		–		4	–	4	–	1
Geneva		–		4	–	5	–	2
Dickinson		–		3	–	4	–	2
Amherst		–		3	–	4	–	1
Tufts		–		3	–	4	–	1
Franklin & Marshall		–		4	–	6	–	0
Rutgers		–		3	–	5	–	1
Springfield Training School		–		2	–	4	–	2
Bucknell		–		4	–	7	–	0
New Hampshire		–		1	–	5	–	2
Villanova		–		1	–	5	–	1
Holy Cross		–		1	–	7	–	2
Wesleyan		–		1	–	7	–	1
Carnegie Tech		–		1	–	8	–	0

The 1907 Geneva Covenanters football team was an American football team that represented Geneva College as an independent during the 1907 college football season. Led by first-year head coach Arthur McKean, the team compiled a record of 4–5–2.

== Schedule ==
Date	Opponent	Site	Result	Source
September 21	Alumni	Beaver Falls, PA	T 0–0	
September 28	at Penn State	Beaver Field; State College, PA	L 0–34	
October 5	Carnegie Tech	Beaver Falls, PA	W 6–0	
October 12	Allegheny	Beaver Falls, PA	T 0–0	
October 19	at Mount Union	Alliance, OH	W 8–5	
October 26	at Westminster (PA)	New Wilmington, PA	W 6–5	
November 2	Westminster (PA)	Beaver Falls, PA	L 0–12	
November 9	at Allegheny	Meadville, PA	L 4–11	
November 16	at Grove City	Grove City, PA	L 0–6	
November 20	Grove City	Beaver Falls, PA	W 6–0	
November 23	at Mount Union	Alliance, OH	L 0–27	
