= 1907 Fordham football team =

American college football season

1907 Fordham football
- Conference: Independent
- Record: 18–1–1 / 6–1–1
- Head coach: Fred L. Smith (4th season)
- Captain: Howard Gargan
- Home stadium: Fordham Field

1907 Eastern college football independents records
	Conf.			Overall
Team	W	L	T	W		L		T
Yale		–		9	–	0	–	1
Dartmouth		–		8	–	0	–	1
Penn		–		11	–	1	–	0
Carlisle		–		10	–	1	–	0
Temple		–		4	–	0	–	2
Fordham		–		6	–	1	–	1
Cornell		–		8	–	2	–	0
Western U. of Penn.		–		8	–	2	–	0
Princeton		–		7	–	2	–	0
Washington & Jefferson		–		7	–	2	–	0
Lafayette		–		7	–	2	–	1
Lehigh		–		7	–	2	–	1
Swarthmore		–		6	–	2	–	0
Army		–		6	–	2	–	1
NYU		–		5	–	2	–	0
Vermont		–		4	–	1	–	2
Harvard		–		7	–	3	–	0
Brown		–		7	–	3	–	0
Penn State		–		6	–	4	–	0
Syracuse		–		5	–	3	–	1
Drexel		–		3	–	2	–	2
Colgate		–		4	–	4	–	1
Geneva		–		4	–	5	–	2
Dickinson		–		3	–	4	–	2
Amherst		–		3	–	4	–	1
Tufts		–		3	–	4	–	1
Franklin & Marshall		–		4	–	6	–	0
Rutgers		–		3	–	5	–	1
Springfield Training School		–		2	–	4	–	2
Bucknell		–		4	–	7	–	0
New Hampshire		–		1	–	5	–	2
Villanova		–		1	–	5	–	1
Holy Cross		–		1	–	7	–	2
Wesleyan		–		1	–	7	–	1
Carnegie Tech		–		1	–	8	–	0

The 1907 Fordham football team was an American football team that represented Fordham University as an independent during the 1907 college football season. Fordham claims a 18–1–1 record, and College Football Data Warehouse (CFDW) lists the team's record at 6–1–1.

Fred L. Smith was the team's coach for a fourth and final year. Quarterback Howard Gargan was the team captain and took over as head coach in 1908. The team played its home games at Fordham Field in The Bronx.

== Schedule ==
The following eight games are reported in Fordham's media guide, CFDW, and contemporaneous press coverage.

Date	Opponent	Site	Result	Source
September 28	at Rutgers	Neilson Field; New Brunswick, NJ	T 5–5	
October 5	RPI	Fordham Field; Bronx, NY	W 12–0	
October 19	Franklin & Marshall	Fordham Field; Bronx, NY	W 57–5	
October 26	Georgetown	Fordham Field; Bronx, NY	W 36–0	
November 2	at Holy Cross	Worcester, MA	W 35–0	
November 9	at Villanova	Philadelphia, PA	L 11–15	
November 16	Medico Chirurgical College	Fordham Field; Bronx, NY	W 54–0	
November 28	Holy Cross	Polo Grounds; New York, NY	W 34–0	

The following are 12 additional games reported in the Fordham media guide.

Date	Opponent	Site	Result
	Betts Academy		W 6–0
	Bedford Athletic Club		W 6–0
	Audubon Field Society		W 14–7
	Webster Academy		W 28–0
	Nutley Athletic Club		W 10–0
	YMCA		W 24–0
	YMCA		W 23–10
	NYU		W 16–5
	Fordham JV		W 27–0
	YMCA		W 21–7
	Xavier		W 61–0
	Fordham Prep		W 18–12
