= 1907 Lehigh Brown and White football team =

American college football season

1907 Lehigh Brown and White football
- Conference: Independent
- Record: 7–2–1
- Head coach: Byron W. Dickson (2nd season)
- Home stadium: Lehigh Field

1907 Eastern college football independents records
	Conf.			Overall
Team	W	L	T	W		L		T
Yale		–		9	–	0	–	1
Dartmouth		–		8	–	0	–	1
Penn		–		11	–	1	–	0
Carlisle		–		10	–	1	–	0
Temple		–		4	–	0	–	2
Fordham		–		6	–	1	–	1
Cornell		–		8	–	2	–	0
Western U. of Penn.		–		8	–	2	–	0
Princeton		–		7	–	2	–	0
Washington & Jefferson		–		7	–	2	–	0
Lafayette		–		7	–	2	–	1
Lehigh		–		7	–	2	–	1
Swarthmore		–		6	–	2	–	0
Army		–		6	–	2	–	1
NYU		–		5	–	2	–	0
Vermont		–		4	–	1	–	2
Harvard		–		7	–	3	–	0
Brown		–		7	–	3	–	0
Penn State		–		6	–	4	–	0
Syracuse		–		5	–	3	–	1
Drexel		–		3	–	2	–	2
Colgate		–		4	–	4	–	1
Geneva		–		4	–	5	–	2
Dickinson		–		3	–	4	–	2
Amherst		–		3	–	4	–	1
Tufts		–		3	–	4	–	1
Frankin & Marshall		–		4	–	6	–	0
Rutgers		–		3	–	5	–	1
Springfield Training School		–		2	–	4	–	2
Bucknell		–		4	–	7	–	0
New Hampshire		–		1	–	5	–	2
Villanova		–		1	–	5	–	1
Holy Cross		–		1	–	7	–	2
Wesleyan		–		1	–	7	–	1
Carnegie Tech		–		1	–	8	–	0

The 1907 Lehigh Brown and White football team was an American football team that represented Lehigh University as an independent during the 1907 college football season. In its second season under head coach Byron W. Dickson, the team compiled a 7–2–1 record and outscored opponents by a total of 198 to 45. Lehigh played home games at Lehigh Field in Bethlehem, Pennsylvania.

== Schedule ==
Date	Opponent	Site	Result	Attendance	Source
September 28	Muhlenberg	Lehigh Field; Bethlehem, PA	W 29–0		
October 5	Jefferson	Lehigh Field; Bethlehem, PA	W 34–0		
October 12	at Rutgers	Neilson Field; New Brunswick, NJ	W 16–6		
October 19	Medico-Chirurgical	Lehigh Field; Bethlehem, PA	W 22–0		
October 26	at Dickinson	Carlisle, PA	T 6–6		
November 2	at Ursinus	Collegeville, PA	W 27–0		
November 9	NYU	Lehigh Field; Bethlehem, PA	W 34–0		
November 16	at Haverford	Haverford, PA	L 4–11		
November 23	Lafayette	Lehigh Field; Bethlehem, PA (rivalry)	L 5–22	10,000	
November 28	Carnegie Tech	Schenley Oval; Pittsburgh, PA	W 21–0	20,000	
