= 1907 Washington & Jefferson Red and Black football team =

American college football season

1907 Washington & Jefferson Red and Black football
- Conference: Independent
- Record: 7–2
- Head coach: Frank Piekarski (3rd season)

1907 Eastern college football independents records
	Conf.			Overall
Team	W	L	T	W		L		T
Yale		–		9	–	0	–	1
Dartmouth		–		8	–	0	–	1
Penn		–		11	–	1	–	0
Carlisle		–		10	–	1	–	0
Temple		–		4	–	0	–	2
Fordham		–		6	–	1	–	1
Cornell		–		8	–	2	–	0
Western U. of Penn.		–		8	–	2	–	0
Princeton		–		7	–	2	–	0
Washington & Jefferson		–		7	–	2	–	0
Lafayette		–		7	–	2	–	1
Lehigh		–		7	–	2	–	1
Swarthmore		–		6	–	2	–	0
Army		–		6	–	2	–	1
NYU		–		5	–	2	–	0
Vermont		–		4	–	1	–	2
Harvard		–		7	–	3	–	0
Brown		–		7	–	3	–	0
Penn State		–		6	–	4	–	0
Syracuse		–		5	–	3	–	1
Drexel		–		3	–	2	–	2
Colgate		–		4	–	4	–	1
Geneva		–		4	–	5	–	2
Dickinson		–		3	–	4	–	2
Amherst		–		3	–	4	–	1
Tufts		–		3	–	4	–	1
Franklin & Marshall		–		4	–	6	–	0
Rutgers		–		3	–	5	–	1
Springfield Training School		–		2	–	4	–	2
Bucknell		–		4	–	7	–	0
New Hampshire		–		1	–	5	–	2
Villanova		–		1	–	5	–	1
Holy Cross		–		1	–	7	–	2
Wesleyan		–		1	–	7	–	1
Carnegie Tech		–		1	–	8	–	0

The 1907 Washington & Jefferson Red and Black football team represented Washington & Jefferson College as an independent during the 1907 college football season. Led by second-year head Frank Piekarski, Washington & Jefferson compiled a record of 7–2.

== Schedule ==
Date	Time	Opponent	Site	Result	Attendance	Source
September 28		California YMCA	Washington, PA	W 24–0	500	
October 5		Ohio Northern	Washington, PA	W 19–0		
October 12	3:12 p.m.	Dickinson	Washington, PA	W 34–0		
October 19		at Princeton	University Field; Princeton, NJ	L 0–40		
October 26		Bethany (WV)	Washington, PA	W 32–6		
November 2		at Yale	Yale Field; New Haven, CT	L 0–11		
November 9		Carnegie Tech	Washington, PA	W 26–0		
November 16		at Western University of Pennsylvania	Exposition Park; Pittsburgh, PA	W 9–2	12,000	
November 28		West Virginia	Washington, PA	W 13–5		
