= 1907 Carlisle Indians football team =

American college football season

1907 Carlisle Indians football
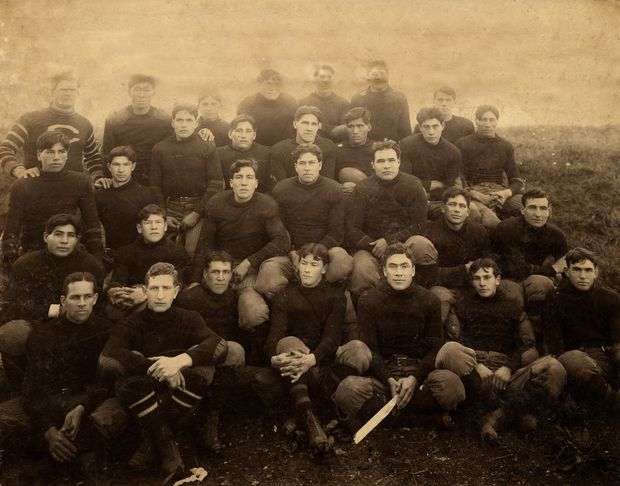
- The entire 1907 squad
- Conference: Independent
- Record: 10–1
- Head coach: Pop Warner (6th season)
- Offensive scheme: Single-wing
- Captain: Antonio Lubo
- Home stadium: Indian Field

1907 Eastern college football independents records
	Conf.			Overall
Team	W	L	T	W		L		T
Yale		–		9	–	0	–	1
Dartmouth		–		8	–	0	–	1
Penn		–		11	–	1	–	0
Carlisle		–		10	–	1	–	0
Temple		–		4	–	0	–	2
Fordham		–		6	–	1	–	1
Cornell		–		8	–	2	–	0
Western U. of Penn.		–		8	–	2	–	0
Princeton		–		7	–	2	–	0
Washington & Jefferson		–		7	–	2	–	0
Lafayette		–		7	–	2	–	1
Lehigh		–		7	–	2	–	1
Swarthmore		–		6	–	2	–	0
Army		–		6	–	2	–	1
NYU		–		5	–	2	–	0
Vermont		–		4	–	1	–	2
Harvard		–		7	–	3	–	0
Brown		–		7	–	3	–	0
Penn State		–		6	–	4	–	0
Syracuse		–		5	–	3	–	1
Drexel		–		3	–	2	–	2
Colgate		–		4	–	4	–	1
Geneva		–		4	–	5	–	2
Dickinson		–		3	–	4	–	2
Amherst		–		3	–	4	–	1
Tufts		–		3	–	4	–	1
Franklin & Marshall		–		4	–	6	–	0
Rutgers		–		3	–	5	–	1
Springfield Training School		–		2	–	4	–	2
Bucknell		–		4	–	7	–	0
New Hampshire		–		1	–	5	–	2
Villanova		–		1	–	5	–	1
Holy Cross		–		1	–	7	–	2
Wesleyan		–		1	–	7	–	1
Carnegie Tech		–		1	–	8	–	0

The 1907 Carlisle Indians football team represented the Carlisle Indian Industrial School as an independent during the 1907 college football season. Led by sixth-year head coach Pop Warner, who returned after having helmed the team from 1899 to 1903, the Indians compiled a record of 10–1 and outscored 267 to 62.

Jim Thorpe, undersized even for the Indians, persuaded Warner to allow him to try out for the team. Thorpe immediately impressed his coach and secured a starting position on the team.

End Albert Exendine was a consensus All-American. In the game against Chicago, fullback Pete Hauser threw a 40-yard pass to Exendine, who ran out of bounds, around spectators and players, and back on the field for the catch.

Hauser became a star during the 1907 season. In an early game, he scored a touchdown and kicked a field goal in a 10–0 victory over Villanova. In October 1907, Hauser ran for a touchdown and kicked to goals after touchdown, scoring eight points, in Carlisle's 14–6 victory over the team from Syracuse University. In November 1907, The New York Times wrote that Hauser handled kicking duties for Carlisle, returned punts, and was also "the mainstay of the defense." That same month, Carlise defeated the Harvard football team, then one of the top teams in the country, by a 23–15 score in front of a crowd of 30,000 spectators in Cambridge, Massachusetts. The New York Times wrote that Hauser's end runs were "marvels" and that he was able to circle the Harvard ends "at will." Carlisle's 1907 season ended with an 18–4 victory over Amos Alonzo Stagg's Chicago Maroons football team. Hauser was described as "a one-man wrecking crew" against Chicago, as he kicked two field goals and an extra point and threw a 50-yard touchdown pass as well.

On October 26, 1907, Carlisle beat a Penn team that had won every other game and was declared national champion. The "national champions" lost 26–6, before an overflow crowd of 20,000 at Franklin Field. Hauser's most historic moment in this game. At a time when forward passes were generally short tosses, Hauser threw a pass 40 yards, hitting his receiver in stride. In her history of Native Americans in football, Sally Jenkins called Hauser's long, 40-yard spiral pass against Penn one of the "three or four signal moments in the evolution of football" and "the sporting equivalent of the Wright brothers taking off at Kitty Hawk." The Philadelphia North American compared it to the "puny" passes of the day, called it "a lordly throw, a hurl that went farther than many a kick," and predicted that Hauser's throw would be "talked of often this year." Hauser's secret was throwing the ball in a spiral, allowing it to travel farther downfield. Carlisle head coach, Pop Warner, said that Hauser was credited as the first football player to throw a spiral pass and could "hit his ends on the dead run with uncanny accuracy."

== Schedule ==
Date	Opponent	Site	Result	Attendance	Source
September 21	Lebanon Valley	Indian Field; Carlisle, PA	W 40–0		
September 28	Villanova	Indian Field; Carlisle, PA	W 10–0	3,500	
October 2	Susquehanna	Indian Field; Carlisle, PA	W 91–0		
October 5	vs. Penn State	Willamsport, PA	W 18–5		
October 12	vs. Syracuse	Olympic Park; Buffalo, NY	W 14–6	12,000	
October 19	Bucknell	Indian Field; Carlisle, PA	W 15–0		
October 26	at Penn	Franklin Field; Philadelphia, PA	W 26–6	22,800	
November 2	vs. Princeton	Polo Grounds; New York City, NY	L 0–16		
November 9	at Harvard	Harvard Stadium; Boston, MA	W 23–15		
November 16	at Minnesota	Northrop Field; Minneapolis, MN	W 12–10	15,000	
November 23	at Chicago	Marshall Field; Chicago, IL	W 18–4		

== See also ==
- 1907 College Football All-America Team
