= 1907 NYU Violets football team =

American college football season

1907 NYU Violets football
- Conference: Independent
- Record: 5–2
- Head coach: Herman Olcott (1st season)
- Home stadium: Ohio Field

1907 Eastern college football independents records
	Conf.			Overall
Team	W	L	T	W		L		T
Yale		–		9	–	0	–	1
Dartmouth		–		8	–	0	–	1
Penn		–		11	–	1	–	0
Carlisle		–		10	–	1	–	0
Temple		–		4	–	0	–	2
Fordham		–		6	–	1	–	1
Cornell		–		8	–	2	–	0
Western U. of Penn.		–		8	–	2	–	0
Princeton		–		7	–	2	–	0
Washington & Jefferson		–		7	–	2	–	0
Lafayette		–		7	–	2	–	1
Lehigh		–		7	–	2	–	1
Swarthmore		–		6	–	2	–	0
Army		–		6	–	2	–	1
NYU		–		5	–	2	–	0
Vermont		–		4	–	1	–	2
Harvard		–		7	–	3	–	0
Brown		–		7	–	3	–	0
Penn State		–		6	–	4	–	0
Syracuse		–		5	–	3	–	1
Drexel		–		3	–	2	–	2
Colgate		–		4	–	4	–	1
Geneva		–		4	–	5	–	2
Dickinson		–		3	–	4	–	2
Amherst		–		3	–	4	–	1
Tufts		–		3	–	4	–	1
Franklin & Marshall		–		4	–	6	–	0
Rutgers		–		3	–	5	–	1
Springfield Training School		–		2	–	4	–	2
Bucknell		–		4	–	7	–	0
New Hampshire		–		1	–	5	–	2
Villanova		–		1	–	5	–	1
Holy Cross		–		1	–	7	–	2
Wesleyan		–		1	–	7	–	1
Carnegie Tech		–		1	–	8	–	0

The 1907 NYU Violets football team was an American football team that represented New York University as an independent during the 1907 college football season. In their first year under head coach Herman Olcott, the team compiled a 5–2 record.

== Schedule ==
=== Regular season ===
Date	Opponent	Site	Result	Attendance	Source
October 5	St. Stephen's	Ohio Field; Bronx, NY	W 24–0		
October 11	at Stevens	Hoboken, NJ	W 18–6		
October 19	Haverford	Ohio Field; Bronx, NY	L 0–22		
October 26	at RPI	Troy, NY	W 4–0		
November 5	Rutgers	Ohio Field; Bronx, NY	W 11–0	7,000	
November 9	at Lehigh	Lehigh Field; South Bethlehem, PA	L 0–34		
November 23	Union (NY)	Ohio Field; Bronx, NY	W 12–7		

=== Scrimmage games ===
Date	Opponent	Site	Result	Source
November 19	Webb Academy	Ohio Field; Bronx, NY	W 10–0	
