= 1907 Vermont Green and Gold football team =

American college football season

1907 Vermont Green and Gold football
- Conference: Independent
- Record: 4–2–1
- Head coach: George B. Drake (3rd season)
- Home stadium: Centennial Field

1907 Eastern college football independents records
	Conf.			Overall
Team	W	L	T	W		L		T
Yale		–		9	–	0	–	1
Dartmouth		–		8	–	0	–	1
Penn		–		11	–	1	–	0
Carlisle		–		10	–	1	–	0
Temple		–		4	–	0	–	2
Fordham		–		6	–	1	–	1
Cornell		–		8	–	2	–	0
Western U. of Penn.		–		8	–	2	–	0
Princeton		–		7	–	2	–	0
Washington & Jefferson		–		7	–	2	–	0
Lafayette		–		7	–	2	–	1
Lehigh		–		7	–	2	–	1
Swarthmore		–		6	–	2	–	0
Army		–		6	–	2	–	1
NYU		–		5	–	2	–	0
Vermont		–		4	–	1	–	2
Harvard		–		7	–	3	–	0
Brown		–		7	–	3	–	0
Penn State		–		6	–	4	–	0
Syracuse		–		5	–	3	–	1
Drexel		–		3	–	2	–	2
Colgate		–		4	–	4	–	1
Geneva		–		4	–	5	–	2
Dickinson		–		3	–	4	–	2
Amherst		–		3	–	4	–	1
Tufts		–		3	–	4	–	1
Franklin & Marshall		–		4	–	6	–	0
Rutgers		–		3	–	5	–	1
Springfield Training School		–		2	–	4	–	2
Bucknell		–		4	–	7	–	0
New Hampshire		–		1	–	5	–	2
Villanova		–		1	–	5	–	1
Holy Cross		–		1	–	7	–	2
Wesleyan		–		1	–	7	–	1
Carnegie Tech		–		1	–	8	–	0

The 1907 Vermont Green and Gold football team was an American football team that represented the University of Vermont as an independent during the 1907 college football season. In their third year under head coach George B. Drake, the team compiled a 4–2–1 record.

== Schedule ==
Date	Opponent	Site	Result	Source
October 2	at Dartmouth	Alumni Oval; Hanover, NH	T 0–0	
October 12	at Wesleyan	Andrus Field; Middletown, CT	W 10–5	
October 19	Norwich	Centennial Field; Burlington, VT	W 11–11 (forfeit)	
October 26	at Holy Cross	Fitton Field; Worcester, MA	W 6–0	
November 2	at Williams	Weston Field; Williamstown, MA	L 5–17	
November 9	New Hampshire	Centennial Field; Burlington, VT	W 34–0	
November 16	at Brown	Andrews Field; Providence, RI	L 0–34	
