= 1907 Army Cadets football team =

American college football season

1907 Army Cadets football
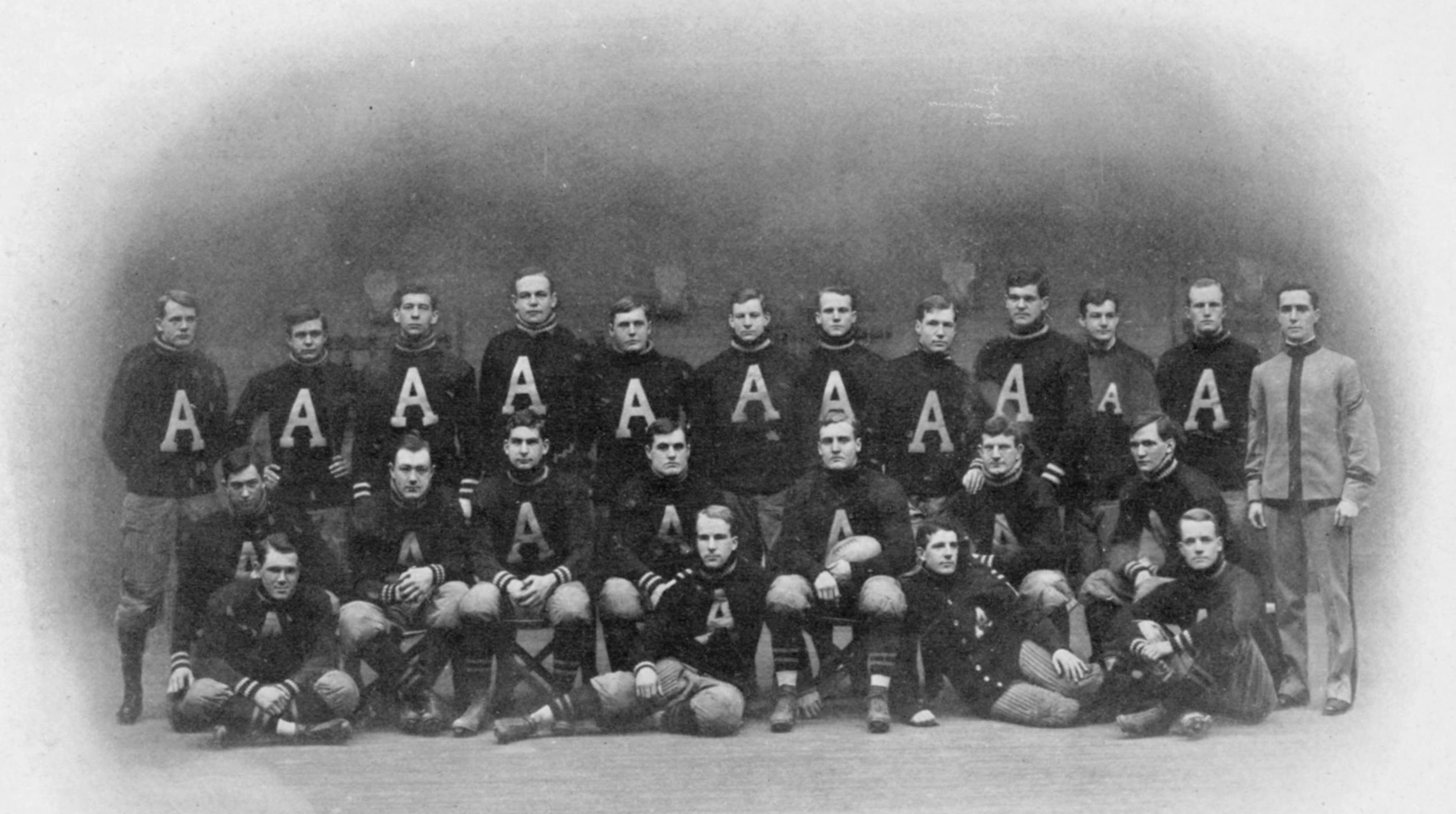
- Conference: Independent
- Record: 6–2–1
- Head coach: Henry Smither (2nd season)
- Captain: Rodney Smith
- Home stadium: The Plain

1907 Eastern college football independents records
	Conf.			Overall
Team	W	L	T	W		L		T
Yale		–		9	–	0	–	1
Dartmouth		–		8	–	0	–	1
Penn		–		11	–	1	–	0
Carlisle		–		10	–	1	–	0
Temple		–		4	–	0	–	2
Fordham		–		6	–	1	–	1
Cornell		–		8	–	2	–	0
Western U. of Penn.		–		8	–	2	–	0
Princeton		–		7	–	2	–	0
Washington & Jefferson		–		7	–	2	–	0
Lafayette		–		7	–	2	–	1
Lehigh		–		7	–	2	–	1
Swarthmore		–		6	–	2	–	0
Army		–		6	–	2	–	1
NYU		–		5	–	2	–	0
Vermont		–		4	–	1	–	2
Harvard		–		7	–	3	–	0
Brown		–		7	–	3	–	0
Penn State		–		6	–	4	–	0
Syracuse		–		5	–	3	–	1
Drexel		–		3	–	2	–	2
Colgate		–		4	–	4	–	1
Geneva		–		4	–	5	–	2
Dickinson		–		3	–	4	–	2
Amherst		–		3	–	4	–	1
Tufts		–		3	–	4	–	1
Franklin & Marshall		–		4	–	6	–	0
Rutgers		–		3	–	5	–	1
Springfield Training School		–		2	–	4	–	2
Bucknell		–		4	–	7	–	0
New Hampshire		–		1	–	5	–	2
Villanova		–		1	–	5	–	1
Holy Cross		–		1	–	7	–	2
Wesleyan		–		1	–	7	–	1
Carnegie Tech		–		1	–	8	–	0

The 1907 Army Cadets football team represented the United States Military Academy as an independent during the 1907 college football season. In their second season (first full season) under head coach Henry Smither, the Cadets compiled a record of 6–2–1, shut out six of their nine opponents, and outscored all opponents by a combined total of 125 to 24. The team's only two losses were to Cornell and to Navy in the annual Army–Navy Game.

Two Army players were honored by either Walter Camp (WC) or Caspar Whitney (CW) on the All-America team. They are guard William Erwin (WC-1, CW-1) and tackle Henry Weeks (WC-3, CW-2).

== Schedule ==
Date	Opponent	Site	Result	Attendance	Source
October 5	Franklin & Marshall	The Plain; West Point, NY	W 23–0		
October 12	Trinity (CT)	The Plain; West Point, NY	W 12–0		
October 19	Yale	The Plain; West Point, NY	T 0–0	10,000	
October 26	Rochester	The Plain; West Point, NY	W 30–0		
November 2	Colgate	The Plain; West Point, NY	W 6–0		
November 9	Cornell	The Plain; West Point, NY	L 10–14		
November 16	Tufts	The Plain; West Point, NY	W 21–0		
November 23	Syracuse	The Plain; West Point, NY	W 23–4		
November 30	vs. Navy	Franklin Field; Philadelphia, PA (Army–Navy Game)	L 0–6		
