= 1907 Harvard Crimson football team =

American college football season

1907 Harvard Crimson football
- Conference: Independent
- Record: 7–3
- Head coach: Joshua Crane (1st season)
- Home stadium: Harvard Stadium

1907 Eastern college football independents records
| | Conf. | | | Overall |
| Team | W | L | T | W | | L | | T |
|---|---|---|---|---|---|---|---|---|
| Yale | | – | | 9 | – | 0 | – | 1 |
| Dartmouth | | – | | 8 | – | 0 | – | 1 |
| Penn | | – | | 11 | – | 1 | – | 0 |
| Carlisle | | – | | 10 | – | 1 | – | 0 |
| Temple | | – | | 4 | – | 0 | – | 2 |
| Fordham | | – | | 6 | – | 1 | – | 1 |
| Cornell | | – | | 8 | – | 2 | – | 0 |
| Western U. of Penn. | | – | | 8 | – | 2 | – | 0 |
| Princeton | | – | | 7 | – | 2 | – | 0 |
| Washington & Jefferson | | – | | 7 | – | 2 | – | 0 |
| Lafayette | | – | | 7 | – | 2 | – | 1 |
| Lehigh | | – | | 7 | – | 2 | – | 1 |
| Swarthmore | | – | | 6 | – | 2 | – | 0 |
| Army | | – | | 6 | – | 2 | – | 1 |
| NYU | | – | | 5 | – | 2 | – | 0 |
| Vermont | | – | | 4 | – | 1 | – | 2 |
| Harvard | | – | | 7 | – | 3 | – | 0 |
| Brown | | – | | 7 | – | 3 | – | 0 |
| Penn State | | – | | 6 | – | 4 | – | 0 |
| Syracuse | | – | | 5 | – | 3 | – | 1 |
| Drexel | | – | | 3 | – | 2 | – | 2 |
| Colgate | | – | | 4 | – | 4 | – | 1 |
| Geneva | | – | | 4 | – | 5 | – | 2 |
| Dickinson | | – | | 3 | – | 4 | – | 2 |
| Amherst | | – | | 3 | – | 4 | – | 1 |
| Tufts | | – | | 3 | – | 4 | – | 1 |
| Frankin & Marshall | | – | | 4 | – | 6 | – | 0 |
| Rutgers | | – | | 3 | – | 5 | – | 1 |
| Springfield Training School | | – | | 2 | – | 4 | – | 2 |
| Bucknell | | – | | 4 | – | 7 | – | 0 |
| New Hampshire | | – | | 1 | – | 5 | – | 2 |
| Villanova | | – | | 1 | – | 5 | – | 1 |
| Holy Cross | | – | | 1 | – | 7 | – | 2 |
| Wesleyan | | – | | 1 | – | 7 | – | 1 |
| Carnegie Tech | | – | | 1 | – | 8 | – | 0 |

The 1907 Harvard Crimson football team represented Harvard University in the 1907 college football season. The Crimson finished with a 7–3 record under first-year head coach Joshua Crane. Walter Camp selected only one Harvard player, halfback Jack Wendell, as a first-team player on his 1907 College Football All-America Team. Caspar Whitney selected two Harvard players as first-team members of his All-America team: Wendell and center Patrick Grant.

== Schedule ==
| Date | Time | Opponent | Site | Result | Attendance | Source |
|---|---|---|---|---|---|---|
| September 28 | | Bowdoin | Harvard Stadium; Boston, MA | W 5–0 | | |
| October 2 | | Maine | Harvard Stadium; Boston, MA | W 30–0 | | |
| October 5 | | Bates | Harvard Stadium; Boston, MA | W 33–4 | | |
| October 12 | | Williams | Harvard Stadium; Boston, MA | W 18–0 | | |
| October 19 | | at Navy | Worden Field; Annapolis, MD | W 6–0 | | |
| October 26 | 3:00 p.m. | Springfield Training School | Harvard Stadium; Boston, MA | W 9–5 | 12,000 | |
| November 2 | | Brown | Harvard Stadium; Boston, MA | W 6–5 | | |
| November 9 | | Carlisle | Harvard Stadium, Boston, MA | L 15–23 | | |
| November 16 | | Dartmouth | Harvard Stadium; Boston, MA (rivalry) | L 0–22 | | |
| November 23 | | Yale | Harvard Stadium; Boston, MA (rivalry) | L 0–12 | 40,000 | |
