= 1907 Bucknell football team =

American college football season

1907 Bucknell football
- Conference: Independent
- Record: 4–7
- Head coach: James H. Costello (1st season)
- Captain: Chester Niple

1907 Eastern college football independents records
	Conf.			Overall
Team	W	L	T	W		L		T
Yale		–		9	–	0	–	1
Dartmouth		–		8	–	0	–	1
Penn		–		11	–	1	–	0
Carlisle		–		10	–	1	–	0
Temple		–		4	–	0	–	2
Fordham		–		6	–	1	–	1
Cornell		–		8	–	2	–	0
Western U. of Penn.		–		8	–	2	–	0
Princeton		–		7	–	2	–	0
Washington & Jefferson		–		7	–	2	–	0
Lafayette		–		7	–	2	–	1
Lehigh		–		7	–	2	–	1
Swarthmore		–		6	–	2	–	0
Army		–		6	–	2	–	1
NYU		–		5	–	2	–	0
Vermont		–		4	–	1	–	2
Harvard		–		7	–	3	–	0
Brown		–		7	–	3	–	0
Penn State		–		6	–	4	–	0
Syracuse		–		5	–	3	–	1
Drexel		–		3	–	2	–	2
Colgate		–		4	–	4	–	1
Geneva		–		4	–	5	–	2
Dickinson		–		3	–	4	–	2
Amherst		–		3	–	4	–	1
Tufts		–		3	–	4	–	1
Franklin & Marshall		–		4	–	6	–	0
Rutgers		–		3	–	5	–	1
Springfield Training School		–		2	–	4	–	2
Bucknell		–		4	–	7	–	0
New Hampshire		–		1	–	5	–	2
Villanova		–		1	–	5	–	1
Holy Cross		–		1	–	7	–	2
Wesleyan		–		1	–	7	–	1
Carnegie Tech		–		1	–	8	–	0

The 1907 Bucknell football team was an American football team that represented Bucknell University as an independent during the 1907 college football season. Led by James H. Costello in his first and only season as head coach, the team compiled a 4–7 record. Chester Niple was the team captain.

== Schedule ==
Date	Time	Opponent	Site	Result	Attendance	Source
September 21		Mansfield	Lewisburg, PA	W 15–2		
September 28		Gettysburg	Lewisburg, PA	W 5–0		
October 5		at Penn	Franklin Field; Philadelphia, PA	L 2–29		
October 12		at Princeton	University Field; Princeton, NJ	L 0–52		
October 19		at Carlisle	Indian Field; Carlisle, PA	L 0–15		
October 26		at Western University of Pennsylvania	Exposition Park; Pittsburgh, PA	L 0–12	4,000	
November 2		at Syracuse	Archbold Stadium; Syracuse, NY	L 6–20		
November 9		at Lafayette	Easton, PA	L 0–34		
November 16		Dickinson	Lewisburg, PA	W 48–0		
November 23		Swarthmore	Lewisburg, PA	L 4–35		
November 28		at Washington and Lee	Lexington, VA	W 2–0		
