= 1907 Rutgers Queensmen football team =

American college football season

1907 Rutgers Queensmen football
- Conference: Independent
- Record: 3–5–1
- Head coach: Frank Gorton (2nd season)
- Captain: Douglas J. Fisher
- Home stadium: Neilson Field

1907 Eastern college football independents records
	Conf.			Overall
Team	W	L	T	W		L		T
Yale		–		9	–	0	–	1
Dartmouth		–		8	–	0	–	1
Penn		–		11	–	1	–	0
Carlisle		–		10	–	1	–	0
Temple		–		4	–	0	–	2
Fordham		–		6	–	1	–	1
Cornell		–		8	–	2	–	0
Western U. of Penn.		–		8	–	2	–	0
Princeton		–		7	–	2	–	0
Washington & Jefferson		–		7	–	2	–	0
Lafayette		–		7	–	2	–	1
Lehigh		–		7	–	2	–	1
Swarthmore		–		6	–	2	–	0
Army		–		6	–	2	–	1
NYU		–		5	–	2	–	0
Vermont		–		4	–	1	–	2
Harvard		–		7	–	3	–	0
Brown		–		7	–	3	–	0
Penn State		–		6	–	4	–	0
Syracuse		–		5	–	3	–	1
Drexel		–		3	–	2	–	2
Colgate		–		4	–	4	–	1
Geneva		–		4	–	5	–	2
Dickinson		–		3	–	4	–	2
Amherst		–		3	–	4	–	1
Tufts		–		3	–	4	–	1
Franklin & Marshall		–		4	–	6	–	0
Rutgers		–		3	–	5	–	1
Springfield Training School		–		2	–	4	–	2
Bucknell		–		4	–	7	–	0
New Hampshire		–		1	–	5	–	2
Villanova		–		1	–	5	–	1
Holy Cross		–		1	–	7	–	2
Wesleyan		–		1	–	7	–	1
Carnegie Tech		–		1	–	8	–	0

The 1907 Rutgers Queensmen football team represented Rutgers University as an independent during the 1907 college football season. In their second and last season under head coach Frank Gorton, the Queensmen compiled a 3–5–1 record and were outscored by their opponents, 99 to 76. The team captain, for the second consecutive year, was Douglas J. Fisher.

== Schedule ==
Date	Opponent	Site	Result	Source
September 28	Fordham	Neilson Field; New Brunswick, NJ	T 5–5	
October 5	at Swarthmore	Whittier Field; Swarthmore, PA	L 5–29	
October 12	Lehigh	Neilson Field; New Brunswick, NJ	L 6–16	
October 19	at Union (NY)	Schenectady, NY	W 12–5	
October 26	at Delaware	Newark, DE	W 39–0	
November 5	at NYU	Ohio Field; Bronx, NY	L 0–11	
November 9	Haverford	Neilson Field; New Brunswick, NJ	L 5–6	
November 16	Jefferson Medical College	Neilson Field; New Brunswick, NJ	L 0–27	
November 23	Stevens	Neilson Field; New Brunswick, NJ	W 4–0	
