= 1907 Lafayette football team =

American college football season

1907 Lafayette football
- Conference: Independent
- Record: 7–2–1
- Head coach: Alfred E. Bull (5th season)
- Captain: Charles Ellicott
- Home stadium: March Field

1907 Eastern college football independents records
	Conf.			Overall
Team	W	L	T	W		L		T
Yale		–		9	–	0	–	1
Dartmouth		–		8	–	0	–	1
Penn		–		11	–	1	–	0
Carlisle		–		10	–	1	–	0
Temple		–		4	–	0	–	2
Fordham		–		6	–	1	–	1
Cornell		–		8	–	2	–	0
Western U. of Penn.		–		8	–	2	–	0
Princeton		–		7	–	2	–	0
Washington & Jefferson		–		7	–	2	–	0
Lafayette		–		7	–	2	–	1
Lehigh		–		7	–	2	–	1
Swarthmore		–		6	–	2	–	0
Army		–		6	–	2	–	1
NYU		–		5	–	2	–	0
Vermont		–		4	–	1	–	2
Harvard		–		7	–	3	–	0
Brown		–		7	–	3	–	0
Penn State		–		6	–	4	–	0
Syracuse		–		5	–	3	–	1
Drexel		–		3	–	2	–	2
Colgate		–		4	–	4	–	1
Geneva		–		4	–	5	–	2
Dickinson		–		3	–	4	–	2
Amherst		–		3	–	4	–	1
Tufts		–		3	–	4	–	1
Franklin & Marshall		–		4	–	6	–	0
Rutgers		–		3	–	5	–	1
Springfield Training School		–		2	–	4	–	2
Bucknell		–		4	–	7	–	0
New Hampshire		–		1	–	5	–	2
Villanova		–		1	–	5	–	1
Holy Cross		–		1	–	7	–	2
Wesleyan		–		1	–	7	–	1
Carnegie Tech		–		1	–	8	–	0

The 1907 Lafayette football team was an American football team that represented Lafayette College as an independent during the 1907 college football season. In its fifth and final season under head coach Alfred E. Bull, the team compiled a 7–2–1 record, shut out five opponents, and outscored all opponents by a total of 198 to 50. Charles Ellicott was the team captain. The team played its home games at March Field in Easton, Pennsylvania.

== Schedule ==
Date	Opponent	Site	Result	Attendance	Source
September 28	Wyoming Seminary	Easton, PA	W 22–0		
October 5	Ursinus	Easton, PA	W 21–0		
October 12	Hamilton	Easton, PA	W 43–0		
October 19	Colgate	Easton, PA	W 21–9		
October 26	at Navy	Worden Field; Annapolis, MD	L 0–17		
November 2	at Penn	Franklin Field; Philadelphia, PA	L 0–15		
November 9	Bucknell	Easton, PA	W 34–0		
November 16	at Syracuse	Archbold Stadium; Syracuse, NY	T 4–4		
November 23	at Lehigh	Lehigh Field; Bethlehem, PA (rivalry)	W 22–5	10,000	
November 28	Dickinson	March Field; Easton, PA	W 31–0		
