= 1907 Holy Cross football team =

American college football season

1907 Holy Cross football
- Conference: Independent
- Record: 1–7–2
- Head coach: Timothy F. Larkin (1st season)
- Captain: Cleo A. O'Donnell
- Home stadium: Fitton Field

1907 Eastern college football independents records
	Conf.			Overall
Team	W	L	T	W		L		T
Yale		–		9	–	0	–	1
Dartmouth		–		8	–	0	–	1
Penn		–		11	–	1	–	0
Carlisle		–		10	–	1	–	0
Temple		–		4	–	0	–	2
Fordham		–		6	–	1	–	1
Cornell		–		8	–	2	–	0
Western U. of Penn.		–		8	–	2	–	0
Princeton		–		7	–	2	–	0
Washington & Jefferson		–		7	–	2	–	0
Lafayette		–		7	–	2	–	1
Lehigh		–		7	–	2	–	1
Swarthmore		–		6	–	2	–	0
Army		–		6	–	2	–	1
NYU		–		5	–	2	–	0
Vermont		–		4	–	1	–	2
Harvard		–		7	–	3	–	0
Brown		–		7	–	3	–	0
Penn State		–		6	–	4	–	0
Syracuse		–		5	–	3	–	1
Drexel		–		3	–	2	–	2
Colgate		–		4	–	4	–	1
Geneva		–		4	–	5	–	2
Dickinson		–		3	–	4	–	2
Amherst		–		3	–	4	–	1
Tufts		–		3	–	4	–	1
Frankin & Marshall		–		4	–	6	–	0
Rutgers		–		3	–	5	–	1
Springfield Training School		–		2	–	4	–	2
Bucknell		–		4	–	7	–	0
New Hampshire		–		1	–	5	–	2
Villanova		–		1	–	5	–	1
Holy Cross		–		1	–	7	–	2
Wesleyan		–		1	–	7	–	1
Carnegie Tech		–		1	–	8	–	0

The 1907 Holy Cross football team was an American football team that represented the College of the Holy Cross in the 1907 college football season.

In their first year under head coach Timothy F. Larkin, the Crusaders compiled a 1–7–2 record. Cleo A. O'Donnell was the team captain.

Holy Cross played its home games at the Fitton Field baseball stadium on the college campus in Worcester, Massachusetts.

== Schedule ==
Date	Opponent	Site	Result	Source
September 25	Norwich	Fitton Field; Worcester, MA	T 0–0	
October 5	at Williams	Weston Field; Williamstown, MA	L 0–12	
October 12	at Yale	Yale Field; New Haven, CT	L 0–52	
October 19	Massachusetts	Fitton Field; Worcester, MA	L 5–10	
October 26	Vermont	Fitton Field; Worcester, MA	L 0–5	
November 2	Fordham	Fitton Field; Worcester, MA (rivalry)	L 0–35	
November 9	at Dartmouth	Alumni Oval; Hanover, NH	L 0–52	
November 16	Worcester Tech	Fitton Field; Worcester, MA	W 15–0	
November 22	Tufts	Tufts Oval; Medford, MA	T 11–11	
November 28	at Fordham	Polo Grounds; New York, NY (rivalry)	L 0–35	
