= 1907 Colgate football team =

American college football season

1907 Colgate football
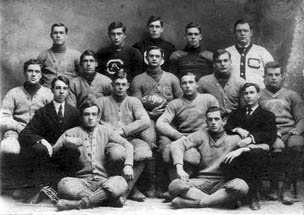
- Conference: Independent
- Record: 4–4–1
- Head coach: Bill Warner (2nd season)
- Captain: W. Lynn Housemann
- Home stadium: Whitnall Field

1907 Eastern college football independents records
	Conf.			Overall
Team	W	L	T	W		L		T
Yale		–		9	–	0	–	1
Dartmouth		–		8	–	0	–	1
Penn		–		11	–	1	–	0
Carlisle		–		10	–	1	–	0
Temple		–		4	–	0	–	2
Fordham		–		6	–	1	–	1
Cornell		–		8	–	2	–	0
Western U. of Penn.		–		8	–	2	–	0
Princeton		–		7	–	2	–	0
Washington & Jefferson		–		7	–	2	–	0
Lafayette		–		7	–	2	–	1
Lehigh		–		7	–	2	–	1
Swarthmore		–		6	–	2	–	0
Army		–		6	–	2	–	1
NYU		–		5	–	2	–	0
Vermont		–		4	–	1	–	2
Harvard		–		7	–	3	–	0
Brown		–		7	–	3	–	0
Penn State		–		6	–	4	–	0
Syracuse		–		5	–	3	–	1
Drexel		–		3	–	2	–	2
Colgate		–		4	–	4	–	1
Geneva		–		4	–	5	–	2
Dickinson		–		3	–	4	–	2
Amherst		–		3	–	4	–	1
Tufts		–		3	–	4	–	1
Frankin & Marshall		–		4	–	6	–	0
Rutgers		–		3	–	5	–	1
Springfield Training School		–		2	–	4	–	2
Bucknell		–		4	–	7	–	0
New Hampshire		–		1	–	5	–	2
Villanova		–		1	–	5	–	1
Holy Cross		–		1	–	7	–	2
Wesleyan		–		1	–	7	–	1
Carnegie Tech		–		1	–	8	–	0

The 1907 Colgate football team was an American football team that represented Colgate University as an independent during the 1907 college football season. In its second season under head coach Bill Warner, the team compiled a 4–4–1 record. W. Lynn Housemann was the team captain. The team played its home games on Whitnall Field in Hamilton, New York.

== Schedule ==
Date	Opponent	Site	Result	Attendance	Source
September 21	Niagara	Whitnall Field; Hamilton, NY	L 6–11		
September 28	at Union (NY)	Schenectady, NY	T 0–0		
October 5	Rochester	Whitnall Field; Hamilton, NY	W 41–0		
October 12	at Cornell	Percy Field; Ithaca, NY (rivalry)	L 0–18		
October 19	at Lafayette	Easton, PA	L 9–21		
October 26	Hobart	Whitnall Field; Hamilton, NY	W 23–5		
November 2	at Army	The Plain; West Point, NY	L 0–6		
November 9	at Hamilton	Clinton, NY	W 20–10		
November 16	vs. Wesleyan	Utica, NY	W 9–0		
