= 1907 Cornell Big Red football team =

American college football season

1907 Cornell Big Red football
- Conference: Independent
- Record: 8–2
- Head coach: Henry Schoellkopf (1st season)
- Captain: George Cook
- Home stadium: Percy Field

1907 Eastern college football independents records
	Conf.			Overall
Team	W	L	T	W		L		T
Yale		–		9	–	0	–	1
Dartmouth		–		8	–	0	–	1
Penn		–		11	–	1	–	0
Carlisle		–		10	–	1	–	0
Temple		–		4	–	0	–	2
Fordham		–		6	–	1	–	1
Cornell		–		8	–	2	–	0
Western U. of Penn.		–		8	–	2	–	0
Princeton		–		7	–	2	–	0
Washington & Jefferson		–		7	–	2	–	0
Lafayette		–		7	–	2	–	1
Lehigh		–		7	–	2	–	1
Swarthmore		–		6	–	2	–	0
Army		–		6	–	2	–	1
NYU		–		5	–	2	–	0
Vermont		–		4	–	1	–	2
Harvard		–		7	–	3	–	0
Brown		–		7	–	3	–	0
Penn State		–		6	–	4	–	0
Syracuse		–		5	–	3	–	1
Drexel		–		3	–	2	–	2
Colgate		–		4	–	4	–	1
Geneva		–		4	–	5	–	2
Dickinson		–		3	–	4	–	2
Amherst		–		3	–	4	–	1
Tufts		–		3	–	4	–	1
Franklin & Marshall		–		4	–	6	–	0
Rutgers		–		3	–	5	–	1
Springfield Training School		–		2	–	4	–	2
Bucknell		–		4	–	7	–	0
New Hampshire		–		1	–	5	–	2
Villanova		–		1	–	5	–	1
Holy Cross		–		1	–	7	–	2
Wesleyan		–		1	–	7	–	1
Carnegie Tech		–		1	–	8	–	0

The 1907 Cornell Big Red football team was an American football team that represented Cornell University during the 1907 college football season. In their first season under head coach Henry Schoellkopf, the Big Red compiled an 8–2 record and outscored all opponents by a combined total of 176 to 45. Four Cornell players received honors on the 1907 College Football All-America Team: tackle Bernard O'Rourke (WC-2; CW-2; NYP; CF); guard Elmer Thompson (WC-2; CW-2; NYH; NYW; NYP; FY-1, AFR); end Charles H. Watson (CF); and halfback Edward L. McCallie, Cornell (NYW).

== Schedule ==
Date	Opponent	Site	Result	Source
September 28	Hamilton	Percy Field; Ithaca, NY	W 23–0	
October 2	Oberlin	Percy Field; Ithaca, NY	W 22–5	
October 5	Niagara	Percy Field; Ithaca, NY	W 47–0	
October 12	Colgate	Percy Field; Ithaca, NY (rivalry)	W 18–0	
October 19	Penn State	Percy Field; Ithaca, NY	L 6–8	
October 26	Princeton	Percy Field; Ithaca, NY	W 6–5	
November 2	Pittsburgh	Percy Field; Ithaca, NY	W 18–5	
November 9	at Army	The Plain; West Point, NY	W 14–10	
November 16	Swarthmore	Percy Field; Ithaca, NY	W 18–0	
November 28	at Penn	Franklin Field; Philadelphia, PA (rivalry)	L 4–12	
