= 1907 Springfield Training School football team =

American college football season

1907 Springfield Training School football
- Conference: Independent
- Record: 2–4–2
- Head coach: James H. McCurdy (10th season)
- Captain: Fred Honhart

1907 Eastern college football independents records
	Conf.			Overall
Team	W	L	T	W		L		T
Yale		–		9	–	0	–	1
Dartmouth		–		8	–	0	–	1
Penn		–		11	–	1	–	0
Carlisle		–		10	–	1	–	0
Temple		–		4	–	0	–	2
Fordham		–		6	–	1	–	1
Cornell		–		8	–	2	–	0
Western U. of Penn.		–		8	–	2	–	0
Princeton		–		7	–	2	–	0
Washington & Jefferson		–		7	–	2	–	0
Lafayette		–		7	–	2	–	1
Lehigh		–		7	–	2	–	1
Swarthmore		–		6	–	2	–	0
Army		–		6	–	2	–	1
NYU		–		5	–	2	–	0
Vermont		–		4	–	1	–	2
Harvard		–		7	–	3	–	0
Brown		–		7	–	3	–	0
Penn State		–		6	–	4	–	0
Syracuse		–		5	–	3	–	1
Drexel		–		3	–	2	–	2
Colgate		–		4	–	4	–	1
Geneva		–		4	–	5	–	2
Dickinson		–		3	–	4	–	2
Amherst		–		3	–	4	–	1
Tufts		–		3	–	4	–	1
Franklin & Marshall		–		4	–	6	–	0
Rutgers		–		3	–	5	–	1
Springfield Training School		–		2	–	4	–	2
Bucknell		–		4	–	7	–	0
New Hampshire		–		1	–	5	–	2
Villanova		–		1	–	5	–	1
Holy Cross		–		1	–	7	–	2
Wesleyan		–		1	–	7	–	1
Carnegie Tech		–		1	–	8	–	0

The 1907 Springfield Training School football team was an American football team that represented the International Young Men's Christian Association Training School—now known as Springfield College–as an independent during the 1907 college football season. Led by James H. McCurdy, who returned for his tenth season as head coach after helming the team from 1895 to 1903, Springfield compiled a record of 2–4–2.

== Schedule ==
Date	Time	Opponent	Site	Result	Attendance	Source
September 28		Williston Seminary	Springfield, MA	T 0–0		
October 5		at Amherst	Pratt Field; Amherst, MA	L 0–5		
October 9		at Yale	Yale Field; New Haven, CT	L 0–18		
October 19		Connecticut	Springfield, MA	W 41–0		
October 26	3:00 p.m.	at Harvard	Harvard Stadium; Boston, MA	L 5–9	12,000	
November 2	3:00 p.m.	at Wesleyan	Andrus Field; Middletown, CT	T 0–0		
November 9		Worcester Tech	Springfield, MA	W 35–0		
November 16		Massachusetts	Springfield, MA	L 0–5		
