= 1907 Penn State Nittany Lions football team =

American college football season

1907 Penn State Nittany Lions football
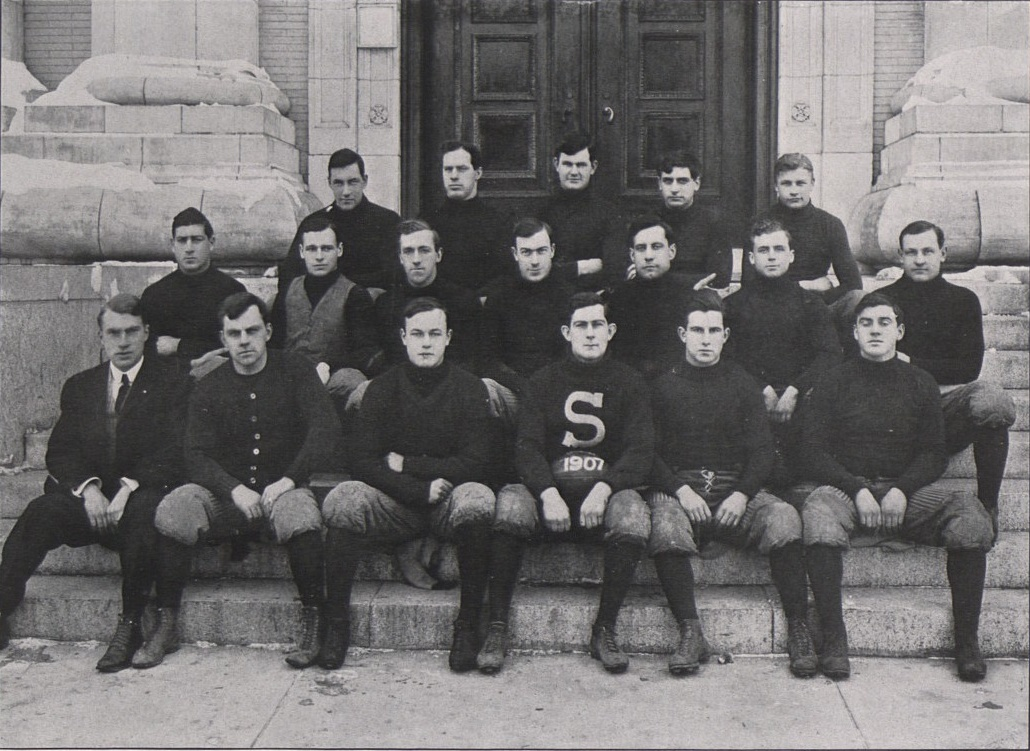
- Conference: Independent
- Record: 6–4
- Head coach: Tom Fennell (4th season)
- Captain: Harry Burns
- Home stadium: Beaver Field

1907 Eastern college football independents records
	Conf.			Overall
Team	W	L	T	W		L		T
Yale		–		9	–	0	–	1
Dartmouth		–		8	–	0	–	1
Penn		–		11	–	1	–	0
Carlisle		–		10	–	1	–	0
Temple		–		4	–	0	–	2
Fordham		–		6	–	1	–	1
Cornell		–		8	–	2	–	0
Western U. of Penn.		–		8	–	2	–	0
Princeton		–		7	–	2	–	0
Washington & Jefferson		–		7	–	2	–	0
Lafayette		–		7	–	2	–	1
Lehigh		–		7	–	2	–	1
Swarthmore		–		6	–	2	–	0
Army		–		6	–	2	–	1
NYU		–		5	–	2	–	0
Vermont		–		4	–	1	–	2
Harvard		–		7	–	3	–	0
Brown		–		7	–	3	–	0
Penn State		–		6	–	4	–	0
Syracuse		–		5	–	3	–	1
Drexel		–		3	–	2	–	2
Colgate		–		4	–	4	–	1
Geneva		–		4	–	5	–	2
Dickinson		–		3	–	4	–	2
Amherst		–		3	–	4	–	1
Tufts		–		3	–	4	–	1
Franklin & Marshall		–		4	–	6	–	0
Rutgers		–		3	–	5	–	1
Springfield Training School		–		2	–	4	–	2
Bucknell		–		4	–	7	–	0
New Hampshire		–		1	–	5	–	2
Villanova		–		1	–	5	–	1
Holy Cross		–		1	–	7	–	2
Wesleyan		–		1	–	7	–	1
Carnegie Tech		–		1	–	8	–	0

The 1907 Penn State Nittany Lions football team was an American football team that represented Pennsylvania State College—now known as Pennsylvania State University–as an independent during the 1907 college football season. The team was coached by Tom Fennell and played its home games on Beaver Field in State College, Pennsylvania. This was the first year that Penn State had adopted the Nittany Lion as its official mascot.

== Schedule ==
Date	Opponent	Site	Result	Attendance	Source
September 21	at Altoona Athletic Association	Altoona, PA	W 27–0		
September 28	Geneva	Beaver Field; State College, PA	W 34–0		
October 5	vs. Carlisle	Williamsport, PA	L 5–18		
October 12	Grove City	Beaver Field; State College, PA	W 46–0		
October 19	at Cornell	Percy Field; Ithaca, NY	W 8–6		
October 26	Lebanon Valley	Beaver Field; State College, PA	W 75–0		
November 2	vs. Dickinson	Williamsport, PA	W 52–0		
November 9	at Penn	Franklin Field; Philadelphia, PA	L 0–28		
November 16	at Navy	Worden Field; Annapolis, MD	L 4–6		
November 28	at Western University of Pennsylvania	Exposition Park; Pittsburgh, PA (rivalry)	L 0–6	10,000	
