= 1907 Princeton Tigers football team =

American college football season

1907 Princeton Tigers football
- Conference: Independent
- Record: 7–2
- Head coach: Bill Roper (2nd season)
- Offensive scheme: Short punt
- Captain: Jim McCormick
- Home stadium: University Field

1907 Eastern college football independents records
	Conf.			Overall
Team	W	L	T	W		L		T
Yale		–		9	–	0	–	1
Dartmouth		–		8	–	0	–	1
Penn		–		11	–	1	–	0
Carlisle		–		10	–	1	–	0
Temple		–		4	–	0	–	2
Fordham		–		6	–	1	–	1
Cornell		–		8	–	2	–	0
Western U. of Penn.		–		8	–	2	–	0
Princeton		–		7	–	2	–	0
Washington & Jefferson		–		7	–	2	–	0
Lafayette		–		7	–	2	–	1
Lehigh		–		7	–	2	–	1
Swarthmore		–		6	–	2	–	0
Army		–		6	–	2	–	1
NYU		–		5	–	2	–	0
Vermont		–		4	–	1	–	2
Harvard		–		7	–	3	–	0
Brown		–		7	–	3	–	0
Penn State		–		6	–	4	–	0
Syracuse		–		5	–	3	–	1
Drexel		–		3	–	2	–	2
Colgate		–		4	–	4	–	1
Geneva		–		4	–	5	–	2
Dickinson		–		3	–	4	–	2
Amherst		–		3	–	4	–	1
Tufts		–		3	–	4	–	1
Frankin & Marshall		–		4	–	6	–	0
Rutgers		–		3	–	5	–	1
Springfield Training School		–		2	–	4	–	2
Bucknell		–		4	–	7	–	0
New Hampshire		–		1	–	5	–	2
Villanova		–		1	–	5	–	1
Holy Cross		–		1	–	7	–	2
Wesleyan		–		1	–	7	–	1
Carnegie Tech		–		1	–	8	–	0

The 1907 Princeton Tigers football team represented Princeton University in the 1907 college football season. The team finished with a 7–2 record under second-year head coach Bill Roper and outscored its opponents by a total of 282 to 23. Three Princeton players (fullback Jim McCormick, halfback Edwin Harlan, and end Caspar Wister) were selected as consensus first-team honorees on the 1907 College Football All-America Team. Two other Princeton players (quarterback Edward Dillon and a center with the surname Phillips) also received first-team honors from at least one selector.

== Schedule ==
Date	Opponent	Site	Result	Attendance	Source
September 28	Stevens	University Field; Princeton, NJ	W 47–0		
October 5	Wesleyan	University Field; Princeton, NJ	W 53–0		
October 9	Bucknell	University Field; Princeton, NJ	W 52–0		
October 16	Villanova	University Field; Princeton, NJ	W 45–5		
October 19	Washington & Jefferson	University Field; Princeton, NJ	W 40–0		
October 26	at Cornell	Percy Field; Ithaca, NY	L 5–6		
November 2	Carlisle	University Field; Princeton, NJ	W 16–0		
November 9	Amherst	University Field; Princeton, NJ	W 14–0		
November 16	at Yale	Yale Field; New Haven, CT (rivalry)	L 10–12	40,000	
