= 1907 Villanova Wildcats football team =

American college football season

1907 Villanova Wildcats football
- Conference: Independent
- Record: 1–5–1
- Head coach: Fred Crolius (4th season)
- Captain: Joseph Slavin

1907 Eastern college football independents records
	Conf.			Overall
Team	W	L	T	W		L		T
Yale		–		9	–	0	–	1
Dartmouth		–		8	–	0	–	1
Penn		–		11	–	1	–	0
Carlisle		–		10	–	1	–	0
Temple		–		4	–	0	–	2
Fordham		–		6	–	1	–	1
Cornell		–		8	–	2	–	0
Western U. of Penn.		–		8	–	2	–	0
Princeton		–		7	–	2	–	0
Washington & Jefferson		–		7	–	2	–	0
Lafayette		–		7	–	2	–	1
Lehigh		–		7	–	2	–	1
Swarthmore		–		6	–	2	–	0
Army		–		6	–	2	–	1
NYU		–		5	–	2	–	0
Vermont		–		4	–	1	–	2
Harvard		–		7	–	3	–	0
Brown		–		7	–	3	–	0
Penn State		–		6	–	4	–	0
Syracuse		–		5	–	3	–	1
Drexel		–		3	–	2	–	2
Colgate		–		4	–	4	–	1
Geneva		–		4	–	5	–	2
Dickinson		–		3	–	4	–	2
Amherst		–		3	–	4	–	1
Tufts		–		3	–	4	–	1
Franklin & Marshall		–		4	–	6	–	0
Rutgers		–		3	–	5	–	1
Springfield Training School		–		2	–	4	–	2
Bucknell		–		4	–	7	–	0
New Hampshire		–		1	–	5	–	2
Villanova		–		1	–	5	–	1
Holy Cross		–		1	–	7	–	2
Wesleyan		–		1	–	7	–	1
Carnegie Tech		–		1	–	8	–	0

The 1907 Villanova Wildcats football team represented Villanova University as an independent during the 1907 college football season. Led by fourth-year head coach Fred Crolius, Villanova compiled a record of 1–5–1. The team's captain was Joseph Slavin.

== Schedule ==
Date	Opponent	Site	Result	Attendance	Source
September 28	at Carlisle	Indian Field; Carlisle, PA	L 0–10	3,500	
October 2	at Penn	Franklin Field; Philadelphia, PA	L 0–16		
October 16	at Princeton	University Field; Princeton, NJ	L 5–45		
October 26	at Yale	Yale Field; New Haven, CT	L 0–45		
November 2	at Swarthmore	Whittier Field; Swarthmore, PA	L 10–18		
November 9	Fordham	Villanova, PA	W 15–11		
November 28	at Steelton YMCA	Steelton, PA	T 12–12		
