= 1907 Western University of Pennsylvania football team =

American college football season

1907 Western University of Pennsylvania football
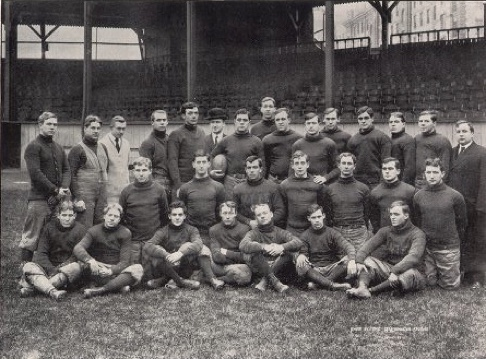
- Conference: Independent
- Record: 8–2
- Head coach: John A. Moorhead (1st season)
- Captain: Calvin Marshal
- Home stadium: Exposition Park

1907 Eastern college football independents records
	Conf.			Overall
Team	W	L	T	W		L		T
Yale		–		9	–	0	–	1
Dartmouth		–		8	–	0	–	1
Penn		–		11	–	1	–	0
Carlisle		–		10	–	1	–	0
Temple		–		4	–	0	–	2
Fordham		–		6	–	1	–	1
Cornell		–		8	–	2	–	0
Western U. of Penn.		–		8	–	2	–	0
Princeton		–		7	–	2	–	0
Washington & Jefferson		–		7	–	2	–	0
Lafayette		–		7	–	2	–	1
Lehigh		–		7	–	2	–	1
Swarthmore		–		6	–	2	–	0
Army		–		6	–	2	–	1
NYU		–		5	–	2	–	0
Vermont		–		4	–	1	–	2
Harvard		–		7	–	3	–	0
Brown		–		7	–	3	–	0
Penn State		–		6	–	4	–	0
Syracuse		–		5	–	3	–	1
Drexel		–		3	–	2	–	2
Colgate		–		4	–	4	–	1
Geneva		–		4	–	5	–	2
Dickinson		–		3	–	4	–	2
Amherst		–		3	–	4	–	1
Tufts		–		3	–	4	–	1
Franklin & Marshall		–		4	–	6	–	0
Rutgers		–		3	–	5	–	1
Springfield Training School		–		2	–	4	–	2
Bucknell		–		4	–	7	–	0
New Hampshire		–		1	–	5	–	2
Villanova		–		1	–	5	–	1
Holy Cross		–		1	–	7	–	2
Wesleyan		–		1	–	7	–	1
Carnegie Tech		–		1	–	8	–	0

The 1907 Western University of Pennsylvania football team was an American football team that represented Western University of Pennsylvania (later renamed the University of Pittsburgh) as an independent during the 1907 college football season.

== Schedule ==
Date	Opponent	Site	Result	Attendance	Source
October 5	Marietta	Exposition Park; Pittsburgh, PA	W 6–0	1,500	
October 12	Carnegie Tech	Exposition Park; Pittsburgh, PA	W 6–0	3,000	
October 19	Muskingum	Exposition Park; Pittsburgh, PA	W 33–0	1,200	
October 26	Bucknell	Exposition Park; Pittsburgh, PA	W 12–0	4,000	
November 2	at Cornell	Percy Field; Ithaca, NY	L 5–18		
November 5	Ohio Northern	Exposition Park; Pittsburgh, PA	W 16–0	2,000	
November 9	West Virginia	Exposition Park; Pittsburgh, PA (rivalry)	W 10–0	> 4,000	
November 16	Washington & Jefferson	Exposition Park; Pittsburgh, PA	L 2–9	12,000	
November 23	Wooster	Exposition Park; Pittsburgh, PA	W 51–0	2,000	
November 28	Penn State	Exposition Park; Pittsburgh, PA (rivalry)	W 6–0	10,000	

== Season recap ==
On February 9, 1907 the Western University of Pennsylvania Athletic Committee hired Yale graduate John A. Moorhead as head football coach for the 1907 season. Mr. Moorhead was originally hired as an assistant line coach on October 29, 1906. Frank Rugh, former WUP player and 1904 Law School grad, was the assistant coach. When 1906 team captain Gil Miller became ill, Cal Marshall was appointed his replacement and did a commendable job. The team officially nominated him team captain for the 1907 season at the season ending banquet. The Athletic Committee also hired Ed LaForce, the well known trainer of the Pittsburgh Pirates, for the 1907 football season. The team lived in a new training house that was built next to campus. The prospects for a successful season were good as end Theodore Perry was the only starter who had graduated. Plus, the Athletic Committee reviewed the eligibility rules and determined that graduate students Jud Schmidt and Joe Edgar could play another season. The same committee then disqualified both players on November 4 for undisclosed reasons. The committee put together a competitive ten game schedule. In its first season under head coach John A. Moorhead, the team compiled an 8–2 record, shut out eight of its ten opponents, and outscored all opponents by a total of 147 to 27.

== Coaching staff ==
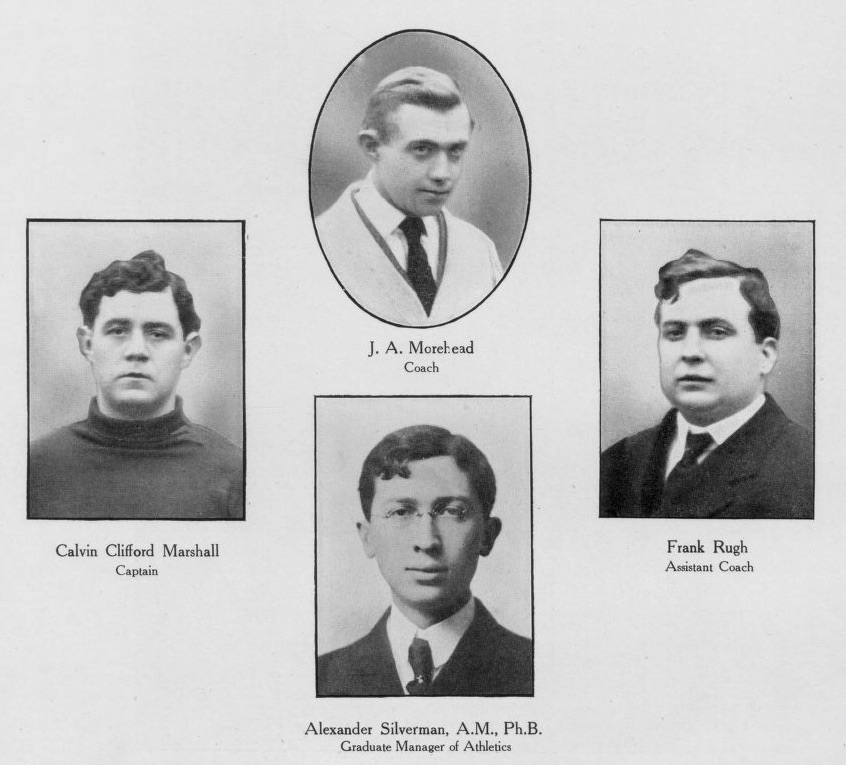
1907 Western University of Pennsylvania Football Staff

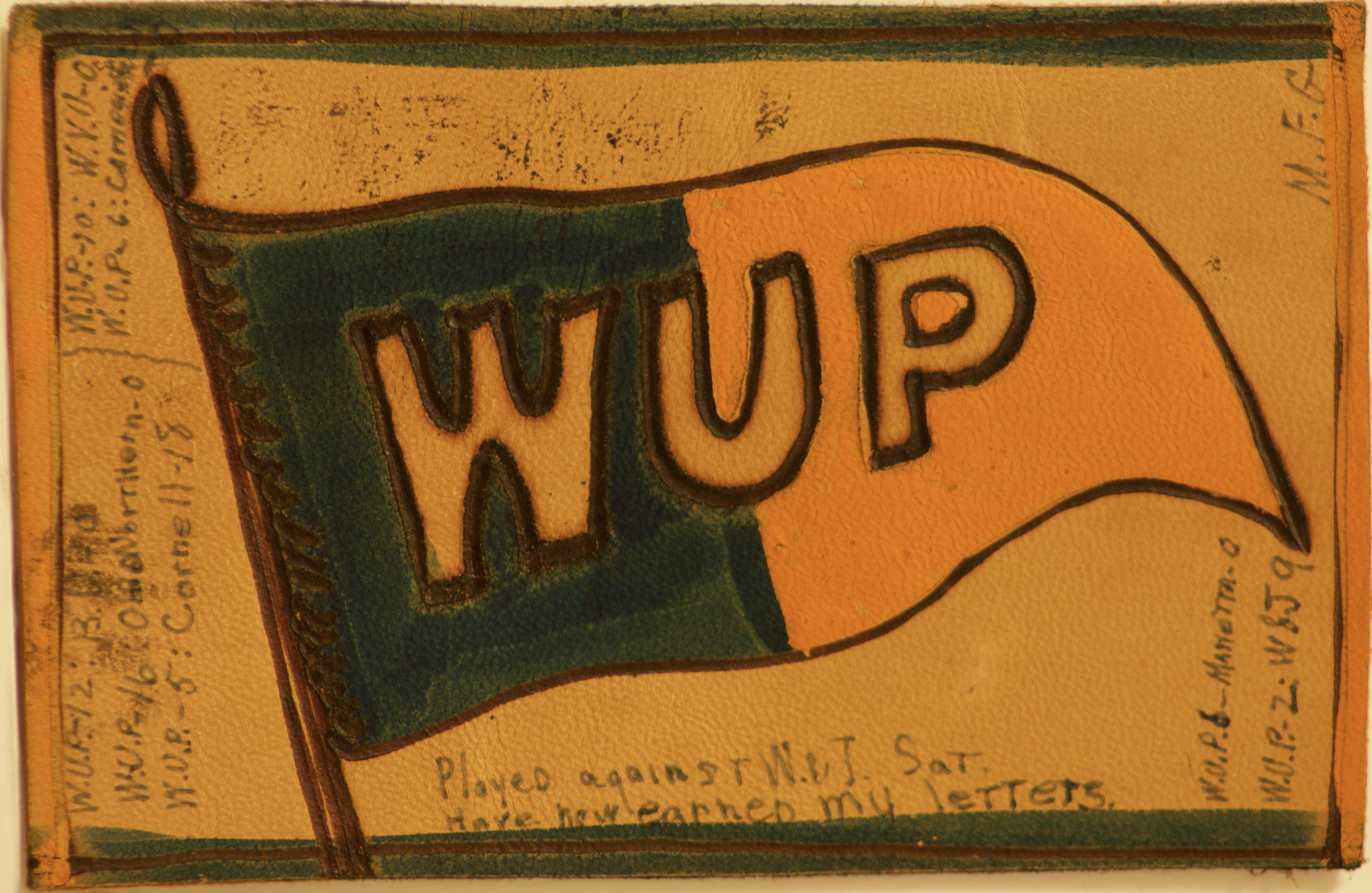
1907 WUP Postcard

1907 WUP football staff
Coaching staff: John A. Moorhead – Head coach; Frank Rugh – Assistant coach	Support staff: Alexander Silverman – Graduate manager of athletics; Dr. Andrew B. Wallgren – Physical director

== Roster ==
1907 Western University of Pennsylvania football roster
Player	Position	Games	Height	Weight	Class	Prep School	Degree	Residence
Calvin Marshall^	tackle	10	6' 1"	200	1908	Gloucester H.S. (MA)	Doctor of Medicine	Mt. Oliver, PA
Quincy Banbury^	end	8	5' 7"	155	1908	Salina H.S. (KS)	Doctor of Dental Surgery	Wichita, KS
Richard Hoblitzell^	end	9	5' 11"	160	1909	Butler H.S.	Associate Dental Degree	Boston, MA
Frank Van Doren^	tackle	10	6' 1"	212	1911		Doctor of Medicine	Seaside, OR
Waldemar Zieg^	guard	6	5' 10"	182	1910	Allegheny H. S.	Engineer of Mines	Pittsburgh, PA
Paul Vitte	guard	1	5' 8"	176	1907	Allegheny H.S.	went into business	
Homer Roe^	end	8	5' 8"	162	1910		Doctor of Dental Surgery	Pittsburgh, PA
John Shuman^	lineman	9	6' 2"	180	1910		Doctor of Medicine	Sioux City, IA
Jack Turner^	tackle	10	5' 8"	189	1908	Salina H.S. (KS)	Associate Law	Gregg, PA
Millard Frye^	end	4	5' 7"	168	1908	Carnegie H.S.	Doctor of Dental Surgery	Homer City, PA
Edgar Chatham^	end	3	5' 7"	150	1909	Allegheny H.S.	Doctor of Medicine	Pittsburgh, PA
Karl Swenson^	quarterback	9	5' 8"	153	1908	Kansas Normal	Doctor of Medicine	Portland, OR
Charles Springer^	halfback	7	5' 10"	168	1908	Dean Academy	Associate Engineering	Pittsburgh, PA
Frederick Klawuhn^	halfback	9	5' 8"	170	1908	Ridgeway H.S.	Doctor of Dental Surgery	Ridgeway, PA
Winfred Banbury^	fullback	9	5' 10"	165	1907	Salina H.S. (KS)	Doctor of Dental Surgery	Pratt, KS
Omar Mehl^	fullback	9	5' 7"	163	1908	Topeka H.S. (KS)	Doctor of Medicine	Braddock, PA
Maurice Goldsmith^	end	5	5' 10"	164	1909		Doctor of Medicine	Pittsburgh, PA
John Mackrell^	fullback	6	5' 8"	165	1909	Pittsburgh Academy	Doctor of Medicine	Pittsburgh, PA
Raymond Focer	end	0	5' 10"	157	1910		Doctor of Medicine	Colliers, WVA
James McCormick	halfback	1	5' 11"	160	1906	Coe College	Associate College/Medical School	
Joseph Campbell^	fullback	10	5' 10"	172	1909		Doctor of Dental Surgery	Woodlawn, PA
Robert Richards	tackle	4	5' 11"	175	1910		Mechanical Engineering	Butler, PA
Samuel Elliott^	guard	8	6' 4"	185	1911		Medical Department	
Arthur Solter^	end	4	5' 11"	175	1911		Medical Department	
John Leo Desch	end	1	5' 9"	157	1908		Civil Engineering	Brooklyn, NY
James Stevenson	tackle	1	6'	198	1912	Chester H.S. (WVA)	Doctor of Medicine	Pittsburgh, PA
John Coen	lineman	0	5' 11"	175	1911		Doctor of Medicine	Bristoria, PA
Elwood Joseph DeLozier	quarterback	2	5' 6"	135	1909		Doctor of Dental Surgery	Pitcairn, PA
Joseph Edgar	guard	6	6'	178	1908	Geneva College	Doctor of Medicine	Oakmont, PA
Albert Schmidt	halfback	10	5' 8"	180	1908	Pittsburgh H.S.	Doctor of Medicine	Turtle Creek, PA
Grey	guard	1						
^ Lettermen

== Game summaries ==
=== Marietta ===
Marietta at WUP

Team	1	2	Total
Marietta	0	0	0
• WUP	0	6	6

- Date: October 5, 1907
- Location: Exposition Park
  Pittsburgh, PA
- Game attendance: 1,500
- Referee: Homer N. Young (Gettysburg)

On October 5 the Pioneers of Marietta College arrived in Pittsburgh to open the WUP football season at Exposition Park. The Marietta eleven surprised the oddsmakers and fifteen hundred fans in attendance as they held the WUP offense scoreless in the first half. WUP took the ball to the Marietta five yard line on their second possession but lost the ball on downs. The WUP defense kept the Pioneers offense in their own territory for the entire half. WUP played straight football with an occasional onside kick. Marietta tried some forward passes but to no avail.

On the WUP's first possession of the second half Cal Marshall gained five yards on first and second down. Jud Schmidt raced twenty-three yards around right end. Charles Springer gained ten around left end and followed that with a thirty-eight yard dash to the end zone for the lone touchdown of the game. Richard Hoblitzell (former Marietta star) was successful on the goal kick after and WUP led 6–0. The remainder of the game was a defensive struggle with fumbles and penalties hindering any offensive continuity by both teams. Coach Moorhead's opening game was a success.

The WUP lineup for the game against Marietta was Richard Hoblitzell (left end), Frank Van Doren (left tackle), Samuel Elliott (left guard), John Turner (center), Joe Edgar (right guard), Calvin Marshall (right tackle), Joe Campbell (right end), Karl Swenson (quarterback), Charles Springer (left halfback), Jud Schmidt (right halfback) and Omar Mehl (fullback). Substitutions made during the game were: Fred Klawuhn replaced Charles Springer at left halfback; Winfred Banbury replaced Jud Schmidt at right halfback; John Mackrerll replaced Winfred Banbury at right halfback; and Winfred Banbury replaced Omar Mehl at fullback. The game was played in 20-minute halves.

=== Carnegie Tech ===
Carnegie Tech at WUP

Team	1	2	Total
Carnegie Tech	0	0	0
• WUP	6	0	6

- Date: October 12, 1907
- Location: Exposition Park
  Pittsburgh, PA
- Game attendance: 3,000
- Referee: Walter S. Sugden (Harvard)

The second game of the city series with Carnegie Tech and their new coach Joe Thompson was a hotly contested affair. More than three thousand fans cheered for their teams. The students of both schools engaged in a cheering duel. Each school had a band to lead a parade around the stadium at halftime to the general crowd's delight.

On their first possession, the WUP eleven fumbled deep in their own territory and Tech recovered. The WUP defense held and Tech's Roura was unsuccessful on a twenty-five yard field goal. The WUP defense did not allow the Tech offense into scoring territory for the remainder of the game. The WUP offense used onside kicks and some forward passes to advance the ball, but fumbles and penalties stymied their progress. Jud Schmidt managed to score a touchdown late in the first half from the ten yard line off a double pass and Richard Hoblitzell kicked the goal after.

The second half was a defensive struggle with many fumbles and penalties thwarting offensive drives. The Pittsburgh Gazette-Times reported:

"W.U.P. was expected to win by a larger score, but the fact is it was mighty lucky to get away with a 6 to 0 game, or a tie, or even a defeat, for the team that Joe Thompson put on the field yesterday was a small one, but it knew football, was courageous and was always in the game....W.U.P. is a larger team, but there was but little rapidity in the getting off of the plays and the men showed but little of the pulling and helping game, and their most sinful omissions were the lack of adaptability in handling punts and in fumbling the ball. W.U.P. had to show its hand at almost everything it had. In the second half there was a departure from the straight football plays and the onside kicks and forward passes were resorted to, and while some of them were well executed, penalties crept in too often to mark the effect of the good work done."

The final tally read 6–0 in favor of WUP.

The WUP starting lineup for the game against Tech was Richard Hoblitzell (left end), Frank Van Doren (left tackle), Grey (left guard), John Turner (center), John Shuman (right guard), Calvin Marshall (right tackle), Joe Campbell (right end), Karl Swenson (quarterback), Charles Springer (left halfback), Jud Schmidt (right halfback) and Winfred Banbury (fullback). Substitutions made during the game were: Omar Mehl replaced Winfred Banbury at fullback; Fred Klawuhn replaced Charles Springer at left halfback; James McCormick replaced Joe Campbell at right end; and Samuel Elliott replaced Frank Van Doren at left tackle. The game consisted of one twenty-five minute half and one twenty minute half.

=== Muskingum ===
Muskingum at WUP

Team	1	2	Total
Muskingum	0	0	0
• WUP	22	11	33

- Date: October 19, 1907
- Location: Exposition Park
  Pittsburgh, PA
- Game attendance: 1,000
- Referee: W. F. Farrar (U. of Pennsylvania)

Fifteen hundred fans attended the October 19 game against the Muskingum College Fighting Muskies from New Concord, Ohio. To generate more offense coach Moorhead inserted both Banbury brothers (Quince and Winfred) and Fred Klawuhn into the starting backfield with quarterback Karl Swenson. The coach looked like a genius as the WUP offense overpowered the Muskies and scored twenty-two first half points. Winfred Banbury scored two touchdowns and brother Quince scored one. Hoblitzell added a field goal from fifteen yards out and three goal kicks. Quince added two touchdowns in the second half – a thirty-five yard dash around left end and a fifty-yard sprint up the middle. Multiple substitutions enabled everyone to get some playing time. The Pittsburgh Press discussed the offensive struggles:

"When the coaches saw what an easy proposition they were going to have of the visiting eleven, they turned it into a sort of practice affair, and instead of trying to roll up a record breaking score as has been the case the past years, they put all their plays to test, chief of which was the onside kick. At this particular play, however, they were not very successful and time and again it failed to work, due to it being kicked improperly or the ends being too slow to recover it...The forward pass was also tried several times, but on the whole was not a success."

The WUP defense held the Muskies offense scoreless and the final score was 33–0. The Pittsburg Press wrote: "The WUP players appeared on the field with bright numbers on their jerseys, and this improved the game considerably from a spectator's standpoint. The visiting players were also provided with them, although they were not firmly fastened on and were out of the running almost after the first scrimmage." This was probably the first time numbers were attached to jerseys for identification purpose in a college football game. Previous researchers have documented the 1908 season as the start of numerals on uniforms by WUP or Washington & Jefferson but Dr. L. H. Baker in his 1945 treatise "Football: Facts & Figures" had the first game with numbers listed as Chicago versus Wisconsin in 1913. The WUP starting lineup for the game against Muskingum was Richard Hoblitzell (left end), Frank Van Doren (left tackle), Waldy Zieg (left guard), John Turner (center), John Shuman (right guard), Calvin Marshall (right tackle), Joe Campbell (right end), Karl Swenson (quarterback), Fred Klawuhn (left halfback), Quince Banbury (right halfback) and Winfred Banbury (fullback). Substitutions made during the game were: Homer Roe replaced Joe Campbell at right end; John Mackrell replaced Quince Banbury at right halfback; Tex Richards replaced Calvin Marshall at right tackle; Paul Vitte replaced John Turner at center; Quince Banbury replaced Fred Klawuhn at left halfback; Jud Schmidt replaced John Mackrell at right halfback; Jay Frye replaced Richard Hoblitzell at left end; Maurice Goldsmith replaced Homer Roe at right end; Edgar Chatham replaced Winfred Banbury at fullback; Elwood DeLozier replaced Karl Swenson at quarterback; and Charles Springer replaced Quince Banbury at left halfback. The game was played in 25-minute halves.

=== Bucknell ===
Bucknell at WUP

Team	1	2	Total
Bucknell	0	0	0
• WUP	6	6	12

- Date: October 26, 1907
- Location: Exposition Park
  Pittsburgh, PA
- Game attendance: 4,000
- Referee: Fred R. Gillinder (U. of Pennsylvania)

On October 26 the Bucknell University football team from Lewisburg, Pennsylvania took on the WUP eleven at Exposition Park in front of over four thousand vociferous fans. The Pittsburgh Press wrote "The field was in splendid shape for the game and the day was an ideal one for football." A brass band led the WUP students on a parade through downtown Pittsburgh and into the stadium. The Pittsburgh Daily Post noted "Enthusiasm was not lacking, the Wup students with a band, and the Bucknell postgrads in the left field bleachers keeping up a continual exchange of yells. Mr. Walter Zieg, father of Waldy Zieg, the Wup guard, amused the crowd with a number of popular airs on a cornet."

The Bison were a formidable opponent. Early in the game Bison halfback Clark intercepted a pass and raced into the end zone but the play was called back due to a penalty. The WUP offense moved the ball but could not sustain any scoring drive. After Hoblitzell had a field goal attempt blocked, the Bison used the forward pass to advance the ball to the WUP five yard line. Bison halfback Kauffman fumbled and WUP recovered. WUP punted and the Clark made a free catch but then missed the field goal. On the next Bison possession Richard Hoblitzell intercepted a pass and carried the ball deep into Bison territory. Hoblitzell's field goal try was blocked but John Shuman recovered for the WUPs on the Bison five yard line. Winfred Banbury carried the ball into the end zone for the first touchdown. Hoblitzell was successful on the goal kick. The half ended with Bucknell again on the WUP five yard line.

The WUP offense scored on their second possession of the second half to stretch the lead to 12–0. Quince Banbury scored on a twelve-yard dash and Winfred Banbury kicked the goal after. The Bison quarterback, Watkins, was injured and replaced by Clauson. The WUP defense was able to keep the Bison offense in check the rest of the game. The final score read 12–0 in favor of WUP.

The WUP starting lineup for the game against Bucknell was Richard Hoblitzell (left end), Frank Van Doren (left tackle), John Shuman (left guard), John Turner (center), Joe Edgar (right guard), Calvin Marshall (right tackle), Joe Campbell (right end), Karl Swenson (quarterback), Quince Banbury (left halfback), Winfred Banbury (right halfback) and Omar Mehl (fullback). Substitutions made during the game were: Homer Roe replaced Richard Hoblitzell at left end; Arthur Solter replaced Joe Campbell at right end; Tex Richards replaced John Shuman at left guard; and Samuel Elliott replaced Calvin Marshall at right tackle. The game consisted of two twenty-five minute halves

=== At Cornell ===
WUP at Cornell

Team	1	2	Total
WUP	5	0	5
• Cornell	0	18	18

- Date: November 2, 1907
- Location: Percy Field
  Ithaca, NY
- Referee: F. A. Godcharles (Lafayette)

On November 2 for the third year in a row the WUP contingent traveled to Ithaca, New York to take on Cornell at Percy Field. Cornell's record was 5-1, with their only blemish a two point loss to Penn State. The Pittsburgh Daily Post noted "After an all morning rain, which thoroughly soaked the gridiron on Percy Field, the skies cleared up for the big football game between the Western University of Pennsylvania and Cornell and hundreds of football enthusiasts journeyed to the field."

The Cornell coaches underestimated the WUPs and started six substitutes. After several changes of possessions, Cornell guard Cosgrove attempted to punt but the center snap went awry and Karl Swenson of WUP recovered the ball on the Cornell fifteen yard line. Winfred Banbury dashed nine yards on second down and then plunged to the two yard line. On first and second down the Cornell defense held for no gain. On third down Quince Banbury scored WUP's first points ever against Cornell. Richard Hoblitzell was unsuccessful with the goal kick after. The remainder of the half was a defensive battle with penalties, fumbles and a muddy field frustrating both offenses.

At halftime the Cornell coaches were livid. On Cornell's fourth possession of the second half their offense took over the game. They advanced the ball quickly from their forty-nine yard line to the WUP twenty-five yard line. The WUP defense dug in but the heavier Cornell lads and the muddy field won out as Cornell's Ebeling finally plunged into the end zone from the six inch line. Caldwell was good on the goal kick after and Cornell had the lead 6–5. On their next possession fullback Ebeling raced forty yards for another touchdown. Caldwell converted the goal kick after. With less than five minutes to play, WUP halfback Jud Schmidt was attempting to punt and Cornell center May blocked it into the end zone and fell on it for the Big Red's third touchdown. Caldwell again converted the goal after. The final score was 18–5.

The WUP starting lineup for the game against Cornell was Richard Hoblitzell (left end), Frank Van Doren (left tackle), Samuel Elliott (left guard), John Turner (center), John Shuman (right guard), Calvin Marshall (right tackle), Homer Roe (right end), Karl Swenson (quarterback), Quince Banbury (left halfback), Winfred Banbury (right halfback) and Omar Mehl (fullback). Substitutions made during the game were: Joe Campbell replaced Calvin Marshall at right tackle; Fred Klawuhn replaced Winfred Banbury at right halfback; Charles Springer replaced Quince Banbury at left halfback; and Arthur Solter replaced Richard Hoblitzell at left end. The game consisted of two twenty-five minute halves.

=== Ohio Northern ===
Ohio Northern at WUP

Team	1	2	Total
Ohio Northern	0	0	0
• WUP	10	6	16

- Date: November 5, 1907
- Location: Exposition Park
  Pittsburgh, PA
- Game attendance: 2,000
- Referee: John R. Simpson (Franklin & Marshall)

On election day, November 5, 1907, the Ohio Northern University Polar Bears from Ada, Ohio visited Pittsburgh to do battle with the WUP eleven at Exposition Park. Coach Moorhead started John Mackrell at quarterback to keep Swenson rested for the Saturday game with West Virginia. Quince Banbury scored two first half touchdowns for the WUPs and they led 10–0 at half time.

Early in the second half Quince Banbury scored his third touchdown and John Turner was successful on the goal kick to make the score 16–0. WUP end Maurice Goldsmith and Lyon of Ohio were ejected for fighting in the second half. The Polar Bears offense spent the remainder of the game in WUP territory but could not score. They were successful with utilizing the forward pass and fake punts to their advantage but the WUP defense would tighten and prevented any scoring.

The WUP starting lineup for the game against Ohio Northern was Jay Frye (left end), Frank Van Doren (left tackle), Waldy Zieg (left guard), John Turner (center), John Shuman (right guard), Calvin Marshall (right tackle), Homer Roe (right end), John Mackrell (quarterback), Quince Banbury (left halfback), Winfred Banbury (right halfback) and Omar Mehl (fullback). Substitutions made during the game were: Maurice Goldsmith replaced Jay Frye at left end; Fred Klawuhn replaced Winfred Banbury at right halfback; and Joe Campbell replaced Maurice Goldsmith at left end. The game consisted of one twenty-five minute half and one twenty minute half.

=== West Virginia ===
West Virginia at WUP

Team	1	2	Total
West Virginia	0	0	0
• WUP	0	10	10

- Date: November 9, 1907
- Location: Exposition Park
  Pittsburgh, PA
- Game attendance: 4,000
- Referee: Walter S. Sugden (Harvard)

On November 9 more than four thousand fans attended the ninth edition of the "Backyard Brawl" at Exposition Park. The Mountaineers were on a two-game losing streak. They lost at Marietta 4-2 and at Navy 6–0. WUP again started the Banburys and Omar Mehl in the backfield.

The first half was a defensive standstill as neither offense could sustain a drive. The Mountaineers managed to reach the WUP fifteen yard line but then turned the ball over on downs. Early in the second half Shelton, the Mountaineer quarterback, was injured and carried from the field. The WUPs drove the ball to the three yard line but could not score. The Mountaineers punted to the fifty-five yard line. The WUP offense again marched down the field. Quince Banbury carried the ball six plays in a row and finally plunged into the end zone for the game's first touchdown. The goal after was not successful and WUP led 5–0.

Coach Moorhead replaced the starting backs with Fred Klawuhn, Charles Springer and Joe Campbell. This ploy worked as the offense moved the ball easily through the West Virginia defense. Conversely, the West Virginia quarterback, Shelton, was injured and the Mountaineer offense struggled in the second half. Springer scored the second touchdown on a ten-yard burst up the middle. The goal kick after was unsuccessful and WUP led 10–0. The WUP offense had the ball on the Mountaineer two yard line when time was called.

The WUP starting lineup for the game against West Virginia was Richard Hoblitzell (left end), Frank Van Doren (left tackle), Samuel Elliott (left guard), John Turner (center), John Shuman (right guard), Calvin Marshall (right tackle), Homer Roe (right end), Karl Swenson (quarterback), Quince Banbury (left halfback), Winfred Banbury (right halfback) and Omar Mehl (fullback). Substitutions made during the game were Waldy Zieg replaced Samuel Elliott at left guard; Fred Klawuhn replaced Winfred Banbury at right halfback; Charles Springer replaced Quince Banbury at left halfback; Joe Campbell replaced Omar Mehl at fullback; Maurice Goldsmith replaced Homer Roe at right end; Jay Frye replaced Richard Hoblitzell at left end; Tex Richards replaced Frank Van Doren at left tackle; and John Mackrell replaced Karl Swenson at quarterback. The game consisted of two twenty-five minute halves.

=== Washington & Jefferson ===
W & J at WUP

Team	1	2	Total
• W & J	4	5	9
WUP	0	2	2

- Date: November 16, 1907
- Location: Exposition Park
  Pittsburgh, PA
- Game attendance: 12,000
- Referee: C. J. McCarthy Jr. (Germantown Academy)

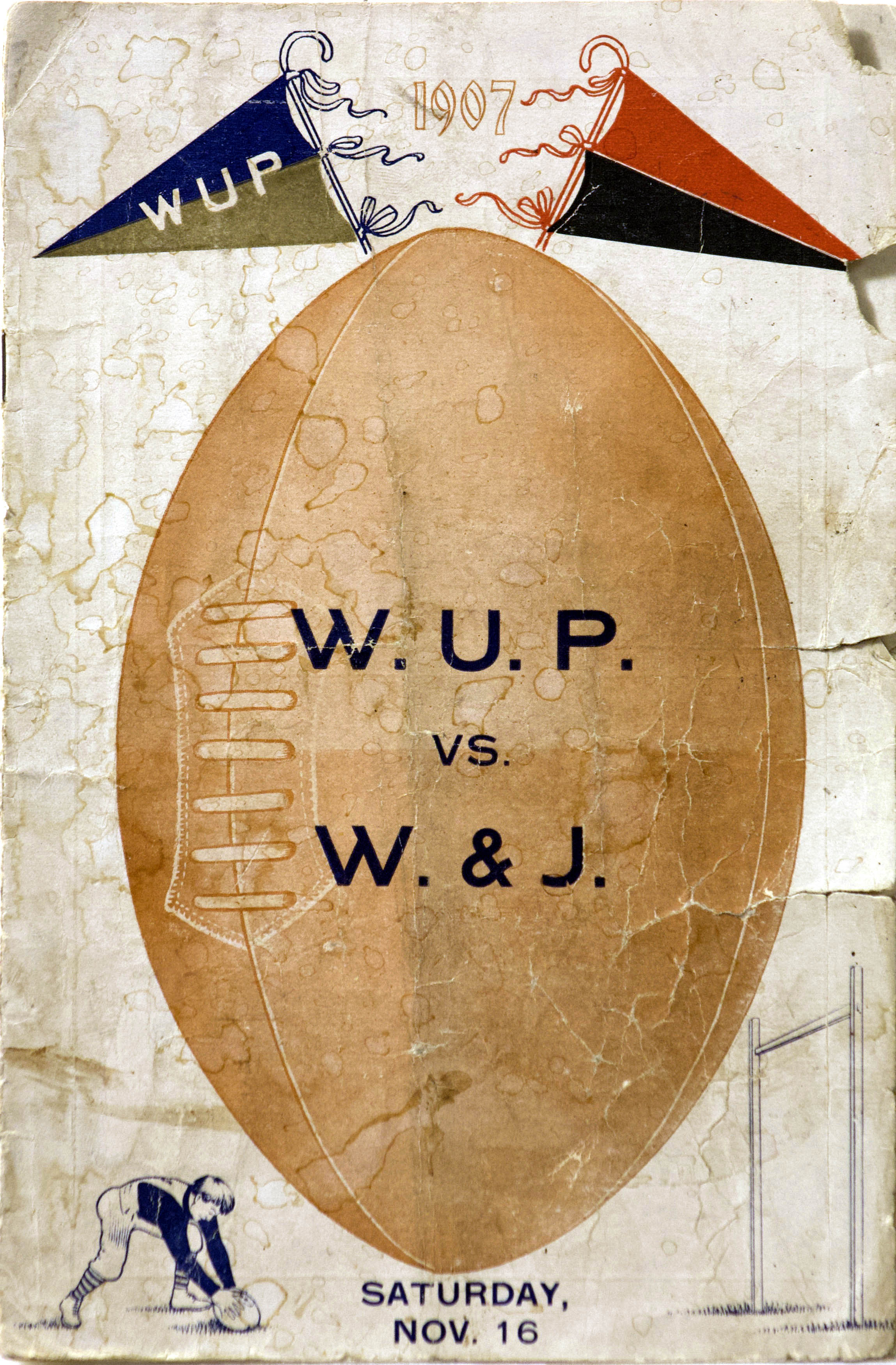
Game Day Program

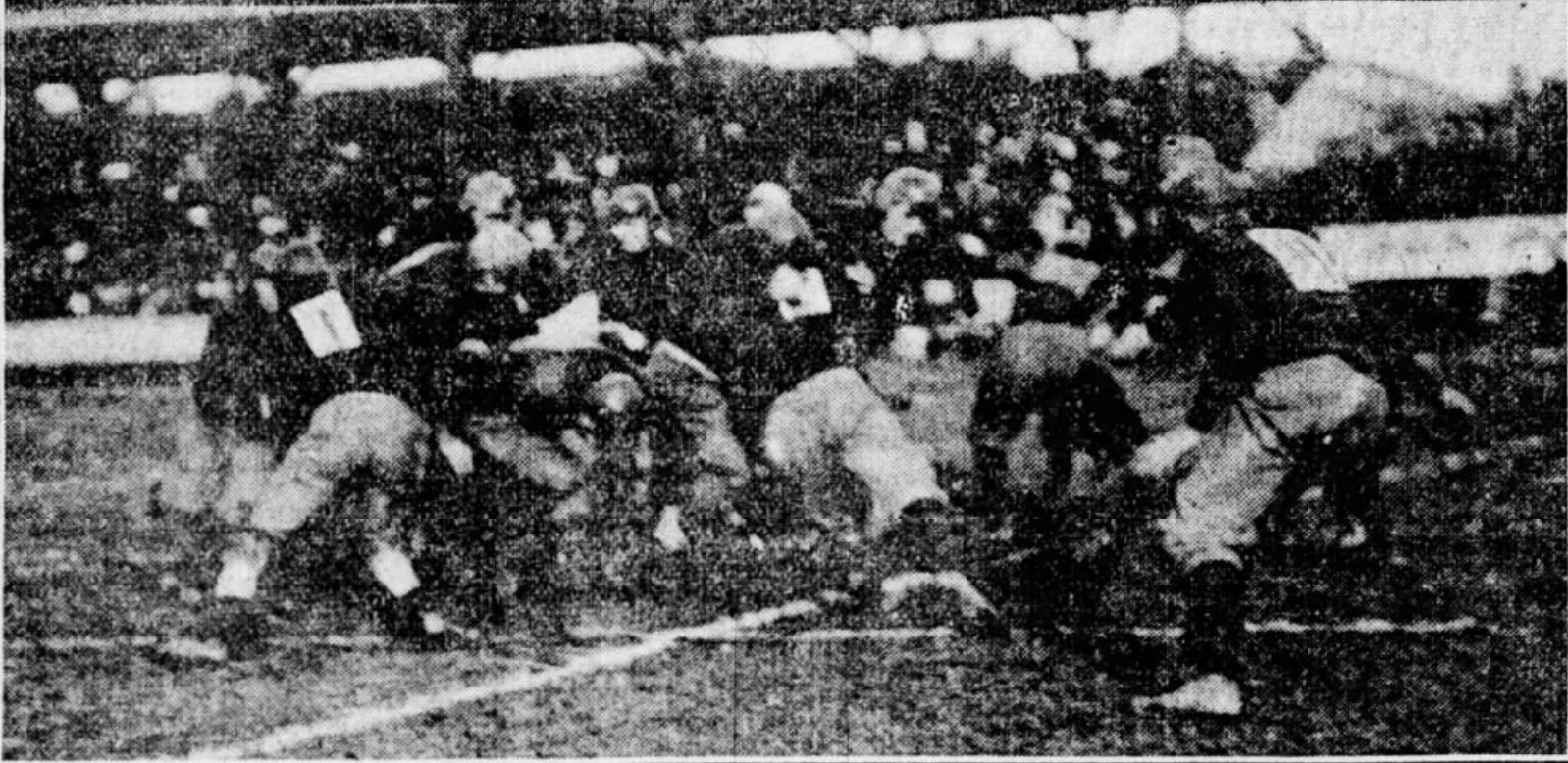
Numbers on jerseys - WUP goal line stand

On November 16 close to twelve thousand rabid fans jammed Exposition Park for the yearly battle between WUP and the Red and Black of Washington & Jefferson. This game was for the collegiate championship of western Pennsylvania. WUP rooters met at Union Station and paraded through the downtown streets and into Exposition Park behind a monster horn carried by six able-bodied students. The W & J backers were not to be outdone and also paraded through the downtown streets led by their mascot goat "Billy". The Pittsburgh Daily Post noted: "Both teams will wear bright numbers and this will enable the spectators to distinguish them readily." This was probably the first time both teams wore numbers in a college football game. Both teams were healthy and both coaches were confident of victory. The Banburys, Omar Mehl and Karl Swenson were the starting backfield for WUP.

The first half was a defensive struggle, with penalties and fumbles causing the WUP offense problems. A misplayed forward pass by Swenson was recovered by Dewar for the Red and Black on the WUP twenty-eight yard line. On second down W & J quarterback Sunny Price kicked a field goal and the Red and Black led 4–0. Mr. Price missed two more field goal tries to close out the first half.

Early in the second half WUP guard Sam Elliott was ejected for rough tackling and replaced by Walter Zeig. On WUP's fourth possession of the second half Winfred Banbury broke through for a fifty-four yard gain to the fifteen yard line. Charles Springer, Joe Campbell and Fred Klawuhn were substituted for the Banburys and Mehl. The new trio moved the ball to the one yard line but could not score and lost the ball on downs. The Red and Black took a safety on first down. After an exchange of possessions the Red and Black punted to Springer on his thirty-yard line. He fumbled and W & J fullback Kumler picked up the ball and carried it into the end zone for the only touchdown of the game and a 9–2 lead for the Red and Black. The WUP offense was ineffective the remainder of the game and W & J beat WUP for the seventh time in eight games.

The WUP starting lineup for the game against the Red and Black was Richard Hoblitzell (left end), Frank Van Doren (left tackle), Samuel Elliott (left guard), John Turner (center), John Shuman (right guard), Calvin Marshall (right tackle), Homer Roe (right end), Karl Swenson (quarterback), Quince Banbury (left halfback), Winfred Banbury (right halfback) and Omar Mehl (fullback). Substitutions during the game were: Waldy Zieg replaced Samuel Elliott at left guard; Charles Springer replaced Quince Banbury at left halfback; Fred Klawuhn replaced Winfred Banbury at right halfback;Joe Campbell replaced Omar Mehl at fullback; Jay Frye replaced Richard Hoblitzell at left end; Maurice Gokdsmith replaced Homer Roe at right end; and John Mackrell replaced Karl Swenson at quarterback. The game consisted of two thirty-five minute halves.

=== Wooster ===
Wooster at WUP

Team	1	2	Total
Wooster	0	0	0
• WUP	28	23	51

- Date: November 23, 1907
- Location: Exposition Park
  Pittsburgh, PA
- Game attendance: 2,000
- Referee: Nathan P. Stauffer (U. of Pennsylvania)

On November 23 the WUP eleven and the two thousand fans at Exposition Park were anxious to see the team from Ohio that held Ohio State to a 6–6 tie earlier in the season. Coach Moorhead emphasized eliminating fumbles in the practice time leading to the game with Wooster. Arthur Solter replaced the injured Richard Hoblizell at end in the starting lineup and was the star of the game. He played great defense, handled the onside kicks flawlessly and scored on an intercepted pass. The rest of the WUP offense took out their frustration with the Washington & Jefferson loss on the Fighting Scots as they scored twenty-eight points in the first half. The Pittsburgh Press wrote: "The feature of the game from a WUP standpoint was the manner in which they were about to work the forward pass and onside kick, both of which they had been unable to use with any degree of success in past games." Wooster gained one first down.

Multiple substitutions were made at halftime and the WUPs scored four more touchdowns. The final tally was 51–0. The Pittsburgh Press noted: "Captain Marshall's men played the kind of football which they did not play against W. & J. and had they dished out the same article of the strenuous game last Saturday, the Red and Black team would be mourning a defeat now instead of having the title of champions of Western Pennsylvania."

The WUP starting lineup for the game against Wooster was Artur Solter (left end), Frank Van Doren (left tackle), Samuel Elliott (left guard), John Turner (center), John Shuman (right guard), Calvin Marshall (right tackle), Homer Roe (right end), Karl Swenson (quarterback), Quince Banbury (left halfback), Winfred Banbury (right halfback) and Omar Mehl (fullback). Substitutions made during the game were: Charles Springer replaced Quince Banbury at left halfback; Fred Klawuhn replaced Winfred Banbury at right halfback; Joe Campbell replaced Omar Mehl at fullback; Maurice Goldsmith replaced Homer Roe at right end; John Mackrell replaced Karl Swenson at quarterback; Tex Richards replaced Frank Van Doren at left tackle; Waldy Zieg replaced Samuel Elliott at left guard; Elwood DeLozier replaced John Mackrell at quarterback; John Desch replaced Maurice Goldsmith at right end; Richard Hoblitzell replace Charles Springer at left halfback; Edgar Chatham replaced Fred Klawuhn at right halfback; and James Stevenson replaced John Shuman at right guard. The game consisted of two thirty minute halves.

=== Penn State ===
Penn State at WUP

Team	1	2	Total
Penn State	0	0	0
• WUP	0	6	6

- Date: November 28, 1907
- Location: Exposition Park
  Pittsburgh, PA
- Game attendance: 10,000
- Referee: F. A. Godcharles (Lafayette)

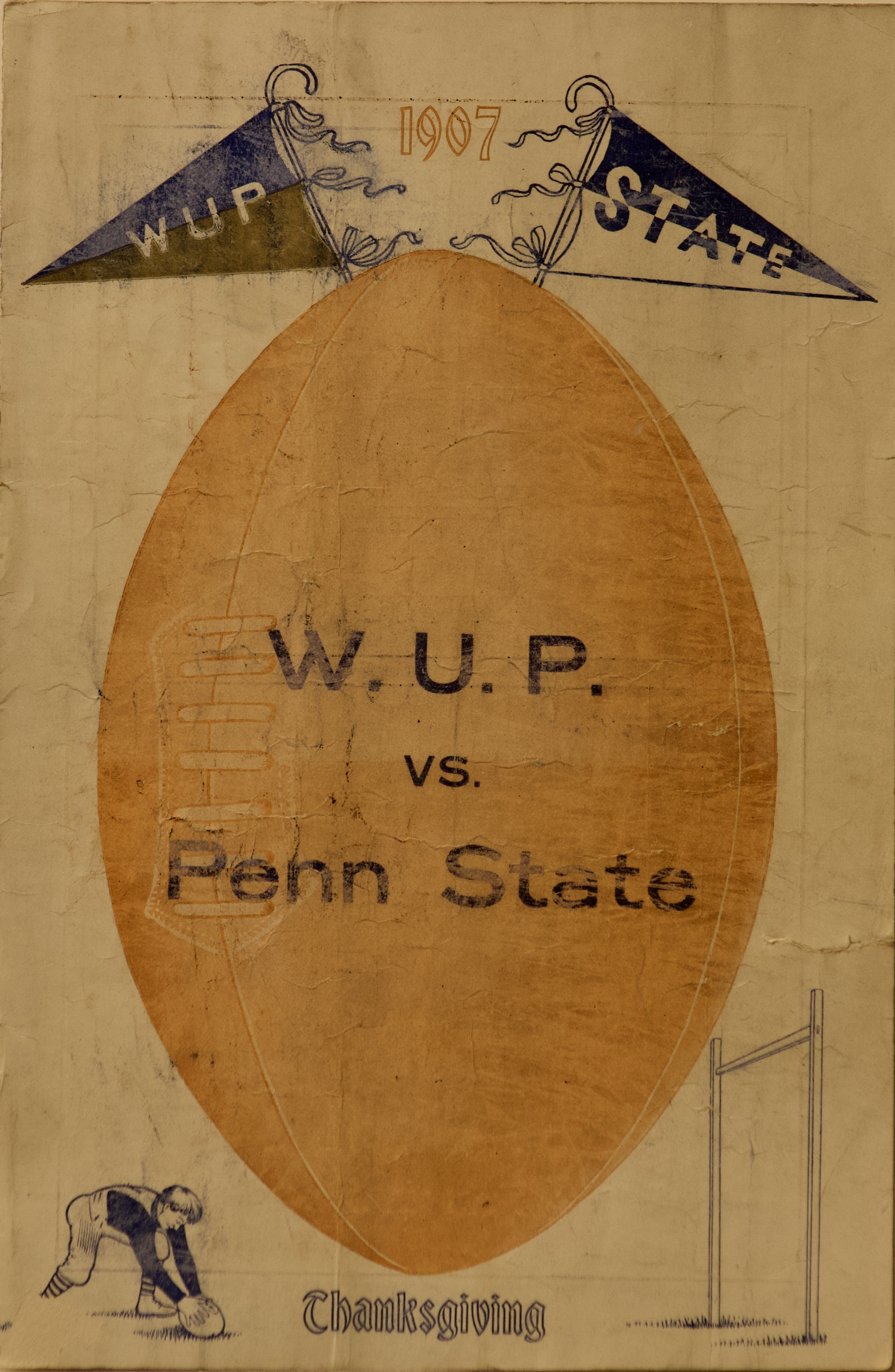
Game Day Program

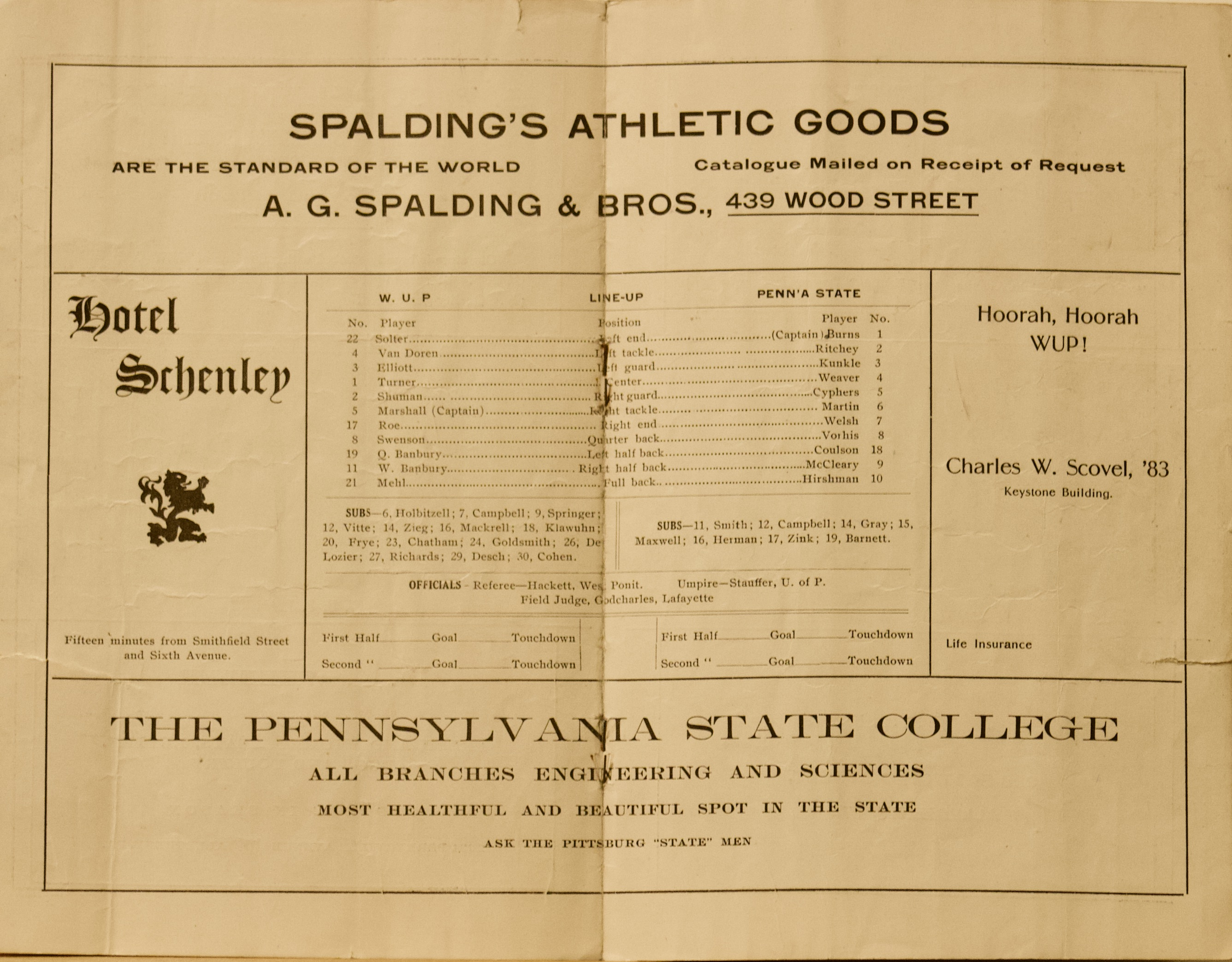
roster page with numbered players

Ten thousand fans spent their Thanksgiving Day at Exposition Park watching the tenth meeting between State College and WUP on the gridiron. The Pittsburgh Daily Post described the scene: "The greatest football day in this city in the history of the fascinating college sport resulted yesterday in a splendid victory for the Western University of Pennsylvania over Pennsylvania State College by a score of 6-0... Thousands were gladdened by the bright rays of the sun, whose face the weatherman had predicted would not show. Gaily attired girls and matrons brilliant with colors of their favorite college added splendor to the scenes of the contest. In the right field bleachers were grouped the hundreds of leather-lunged students of Western Pennsylvania. A brass band kept up the encouragement to the tiring players when the students rested their throats. Fire crackers, megaphones, crickets, bells and other ear-splitting noise producers were ever to be heard." Even though they were on a two-game losing streak, the State College contingent was confident of victory since they had won eight of the previous nine games against WUP. The WUP team was hoping to prove that it was better than its showing against Washington & Jefferson.

The first half was scoreless. Vorhis of State College missed a thirty-two yard field goal and a bad snap botched a later try from the ten yard line. The WUP offense moved the ball but was unable to sustain a first half drive. The second half began as more of the same when Vorhis missed another field goal try from thirty yards out and the WUP offense struggled to consistently move the ball. With less than five minutes to play WUP quarterback Karl Swenson dropped back and threw a thirty-yard spiral to Quince Banbury. He caught the ball then fumbled into the end zone. There ensued a mad scramble with WUP fullback Joe Campbell falling on the ball for a touchdown. Richard Hoblitzell was successful on the goal kick and WUP led 6–0. The game ended a few minutes later with the WUP offense on the State College forty-eight yard line. WUP finished the season 8–2. State College finished 6–4.

The WUP starting lineup for the game against State was Artur Solter (left end), Frank Van Doren (left tackle), Samuel Elliott (left guard), John Turner (center), John Shuman (right guard), Calvin Marshall (right tackle), Homer Roe (right end), Karl Swenson (quarterback), Quince Banbury (left halfback), Fred Klawuhn (right halfback) and Omar Mehl (fullback). Substitutions made during the game were: Waldy Zieg replaced Samuel Elliott at left guard; Richard Hoblitzell replaced Homer Roe at right end; Joe Campbell replaced Omar Mehl at fullback; and Edgar Chatham replaced Quince Banbury at left halfback. The game consisted of two thirty-five minute halves. Numbers were worn on the jerseys as seen on the photo on the left.

== Scoring summary ==
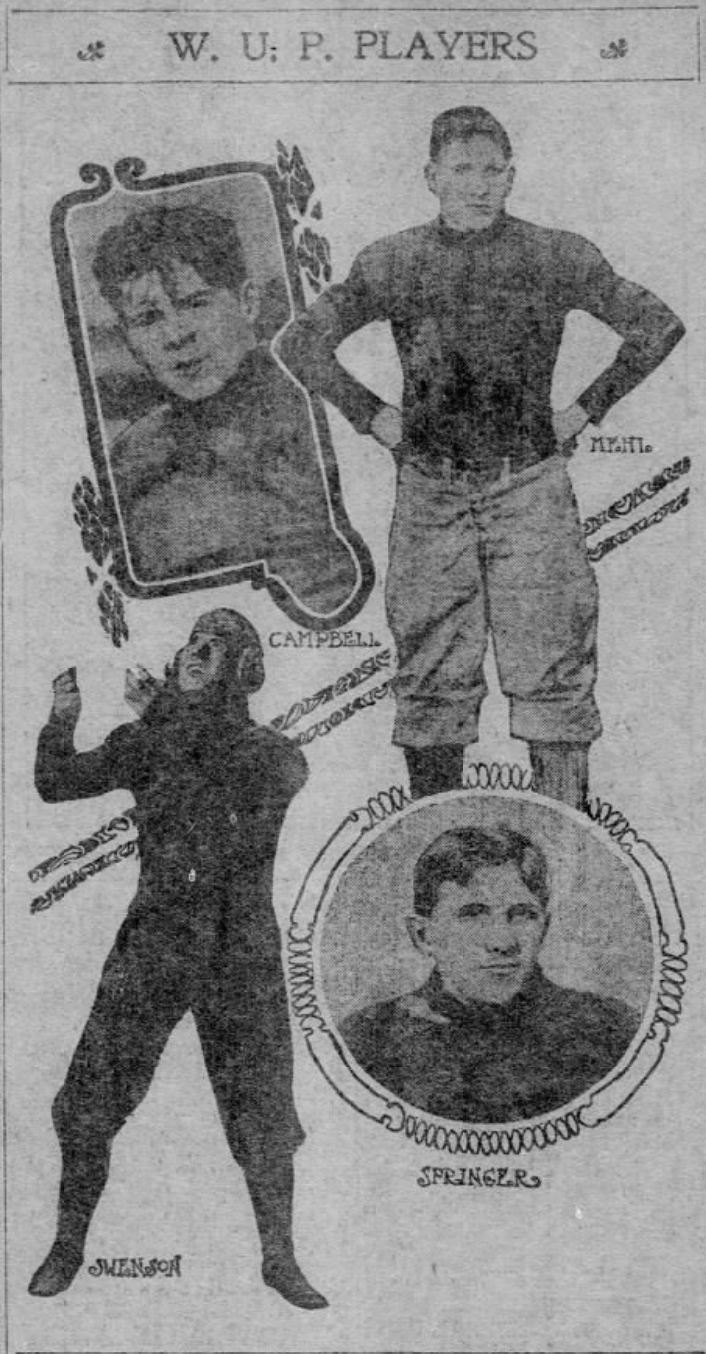
W.U.P. players on 1907 football team

1907 Western University of Pennsylvania scoring summary
Player	Touchdowns	Extra points	Field goals	Safety	Points
Quince Banbury	11	0	0	0	55
Winfred Banbury	4	1	0	0	21
Charles Springer	4	0	0	0	20
Richard Hoblitzell	0	7	1	0	11
Joe Campbell	2	0	0	0	10
Jack Turner	1	2	0	0	7
Jud Schmidt	1	0	0	0	5
Omar Mehl	1	0	0	0	5
Arthur Solter	1	0	0	0	5
Sam Elliott	0	3	0	0	3
Waldemar Zieg	0	3	0	0	3
Team	0	0	0	1	2
Totals	25	16	1	1	147
