= 1907 Carnegie Tech Tartans football team =

American college football season

1907 Carnegie Tech Tartans football
- Conference: Independent
- Record: 1–8
- Head coach: Joseph H. Thompson (1st season)
- Home stadium: Schenley Oval

1907 Eastern college football independents records
	Conf.			Overall
Team	W	L	T	W		L		T
Yale		–		9	–	0	–	1
Dartmouth		–		8	–	0	–	1
Penn		–		11	–	1	–	0
Carlisle		–		10	–	1	–	0
Temple		–		4	–	0	–	2
Fordham		–		6	–	1	–	1
Cornell		–		8	–	2	–	0
Western U. of Penn.		–		8	–	2	–	0
Princeton		–		7	–	2	–	0
Washington & Jefferson		–		7	–	2	–	0
Lafayette		–		7	–	2	–	1
Lehigh		–		7	–	2	–	1
Swarthmore		–		6	–	2	–	0
Army		–		6	–	2	–	1
NYU		–		5	–	2	–	0
Vermont		–		4	–	1	–	2
Harvard		–		7	–	3	–	0
Brown		–		7	–	3	–	0
Penn State		–		6	–	4	–	0
Syracuse		–		5	–	3	–	1
Drexel		–		3	–	2	–	2
Colgate		–		4	–	4	–	1
Geneva		–		4	–	5	–	2
Dickinson		–		3	–	4	–	2
Amherst		–		3	–	4	–	1
Tufts		–		3	–	4	–	1
Franklin & Marshall		–		4	–	6	–	0
Rutgers		–		3	–	5	–	1
Springfield Training School		–		2	–	4	–	2
Bucknell		–		4	–	7	–	0
New Hampshire		–		1	–	5	–	2
Villanova		–		1	–	5	–	1
Holy Cross		–		1	–	7	–	2
Wesleyan		–		1	–	7	–	1
Carnegie Tech		–		1	–	8	–	0

The 1907 Carnegie Tech Tartans football team represented the Carnegie Institute of Technology during the 1907 college football season. The head coach was Joseph H. Thompson serving his first season with the team.

== Schedule ==
Date	Opponent	Site	Result	Attendance	Source
October 5	at Geneva	Beaver Falls, PA	L 0–6		
October 12	at Western University of Pennsylvania	Exposition Park; Pittsburgh, PA	L 0–6	3,000	
October 19	at Westminster (PA)	New Wilmington, PA	L 0–12		
October 26	at Waynesburg	Waynesburg, PA	W 17–0		
November 2	at Mount Union	Alliance, OH	L 0–17		
November 9	at Washington & Jefferson	Washington, PA	L 0–26		
November 16	at Allegheny	Meadville, PA	L 0–6		
November 23	at Case	Van Horn Field; Cleveland, OH	L 0–11		
November 28	Lehigh	Schenley Oval; Pittsburgh, PA	L 0–21	20,000	
