= 1907 Dartmouth football team =

American college football season

1907 Dartmouth football
- Conference: Independent
- Record: 8–0–1
- Head coach: John C. O'Connor (1st season)
- Captain: John Glaze
- Home stadium: Alumni Oval

1907 Eastern college football independents records
	Conf.			Overall
Team	W	L	T	W		L		T
Yale		–		9	–	0	–	1
Dartmouth		–		8	–	0	–	1
Penn		–		11	–	1	–	0
Carlisle		–		10	–	1	–	0
Temple		–		4	–	0	–	2
Fordham		–		6	–	1	–	1
Cornell		–		8	–	2	–	0
Western U. of Penn.		–		8	–	2	–	0
Princeton		–		7	–	2	–	0
Washington & Jefferson		–		7	–	2	–	0
Lafayette		–		7	–	2	–	1
Lehigh		–		7	–	2	–	1
Swarthmore		–		6	–	2	–	0
Army		–		6	–	2	–	1
NYU		–		5	–	2	–	0
Vermont		–		4	–	1	–	2
Harvard		–		7	–	3	–	0
Brown		–		7	–	3	–	0
Penn State		–		6	–	4	–	0
Syracuse		–		5	–	3	–	1
Drexel		–		3	–	2	–	2
Colgate		–		4	–	4	–	1
Geneva		–		4	–	5	–	2
Dickinson		–		3	–	4	–	2
Amherst		–		3	–	4	–	1
Tufts		–		3	–	4	–	1
Franklin & Marshall		–		4	–	6	–	0
Rutgers		–		3	–	5	–	1
Springfield Training School		–		2	–	4	–	2
Bucknell		–		4	–	7	–	0
New Hampshire		–		1	–	5	–	2
Villanova		–		1	–	5	–	1
Holy Cross		–		1	–	7	–	2
Wesleyan		–		1	–	7	–	1
Carnegie Tech		–		1	–	8	–	0

The 1907 Dartmouth football team was an American football team that represented Dartmouth College as an independent during the 1907 college football season. In its first season under head coach John C. O'Connor, the team compiled an 8–0–1 record, shut out eight of nine opponents, and outscored all opponents by a total of 150 to 10. Quarterback John Glaze was the team captain. The team played its home games at Alumni Oval in Hanover, New Hampshire.

== Schedule ==
Date	Opponent	Site	Result	Source
September 28	Norwich	Alumni Oval; Hanover, NH	W 12–0	
October 2	Vermont	Alumni Oval; Hanover, NH	T 0–0	
October 5	Tufts	Alumni Oval; Hanover, NH	W 6–0	
October 9	New Hampshire	Alumni Oval; Hanover, NH (rivalry)	W 10–0	
October 12	Massachusetts	Alumni Oval; Hanover, NH	W 6–0	
October 19	at Maine	Portland, ME	W 27–0	
October 26	at Amherst	Amherst, MA	W 15–10	
November 9	Holy Cross	Alumni Oval; Hanover, NH	W 52–0	
November 16	at Harvard	Harvard Stadium; Boston, MA (rivalry)	W 22–0	
