= 1907 Texas Longhorns football team =

American college football season

1907 Texas Longhorns football
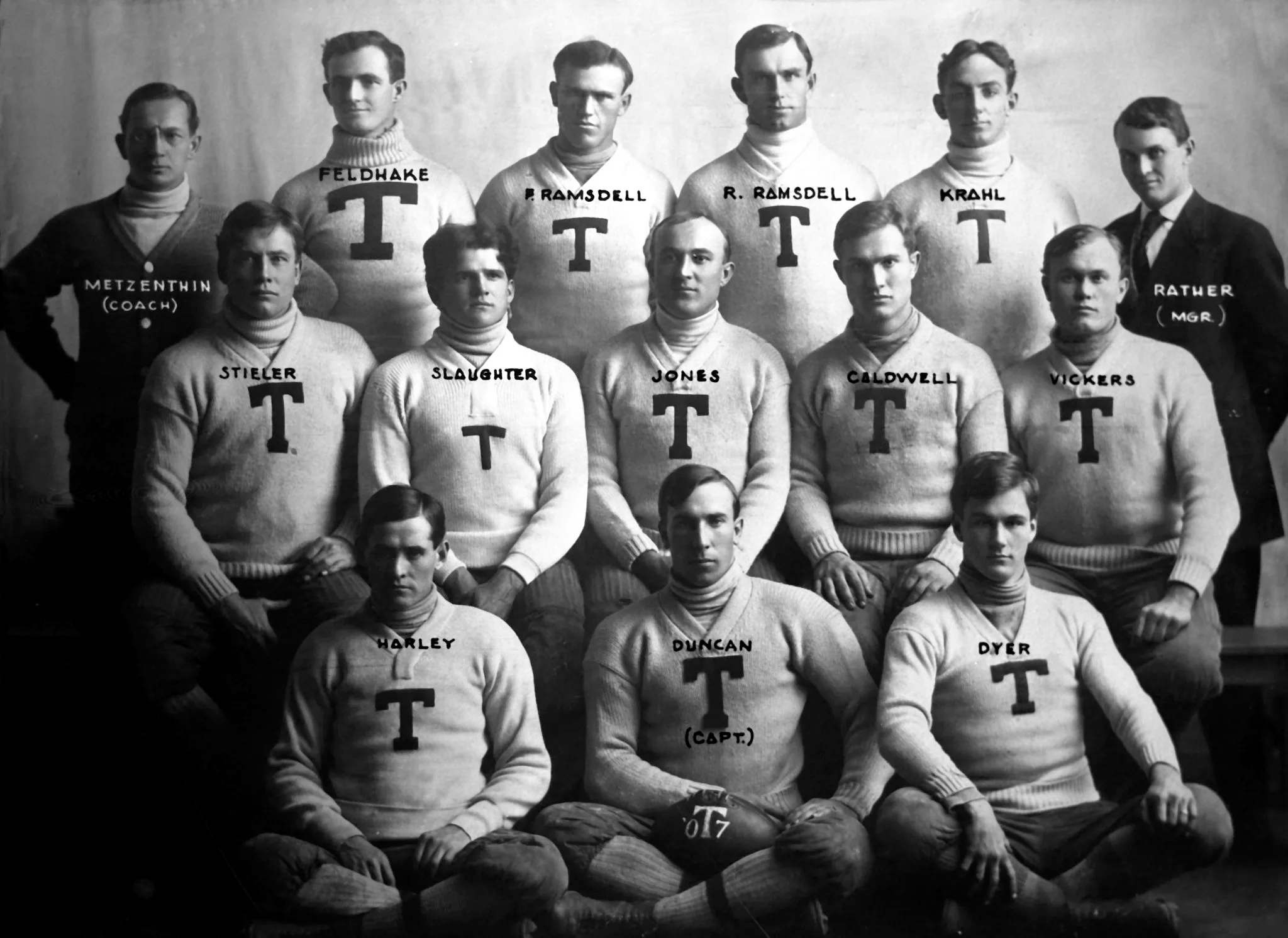
- Conference: Independent
- Record: 6–1–1
- Head coach: W. E. Metzenthin (1st season)
- Captain: Bowie Duncan
- Home stadium: Clark Field

1907 Southern college football independents records
	Conf.			Overall
Team	W	L	T	W		L		T
South Carolina		–		3	–	0	–	0
Stetson		–		2	–	0	–	0
Southwestern Louisiana Industrial		–		1	–	0	–	0
Mississippi College		–		1	–	0	–	0
North Carolina A&M		–		6	–	0	–	1
Louisiana Industrial		–		9	–	1	–	0
Kentucky State		–		9	–	1	–	1
Texas		–		6	–	1	–	1
Texas A&M		–		6	–	1	–	1
Davidson		–		4	–	1	–	1
Florida		–		4	–	1	–	1
Navy		–		9	–	2	–	1
VPI		–		7	–	2	–	0
Virginia		–		6	–	3	–	1
TCU		–		4	–	2	–	2
West Virginia		–		6	–	4	–	0
VMI		–		5	–	3	–	0
Tulane		–		3	–	2	–	0
Oklahoma		–		4	–	4	–	0
North Carolina		–		4	–	4	–	1
Baylor		–		4	–	3	–	1
Arkansas		–		4	–	4	–	1
Maryland		–		3	–	5	–	0
George Washington		–		2	–	4	–	1
The Citadel		–		2	–	4	–	1
Georgetown		–		2	–	4	–	1
Oklahoma A&M		–		1	–	5	–	2
Birmingham		–		1	–	3	–	0
Chattanooga		–		0	–	5	–	1
Delaware		–		0	–	5	–	1
Catholic University		–		0	–	1	–	0
Louisiana Normal		–		0	–	1	–	0
South Carolina State		–		0	–	1	–	0
Spring Hill		–		0	–	1	–	0

The 1907 Texas Longhorns football team was an American football team that represented the University of Texas (now known as the University of Texas at Austin) as an independent during the 1907 college football season. In their first year under head coach W. E. Metzenthin, the Longhorns compiled an overall record of 6–1–1.

== Schedule ==
Date	Opponent	Site	Result	Attendance	Source
October 12	vs. Texas A&M	Gaston Park; Dallas, TX (rivalry)	T 0–0	5,000	
October 19	LSU	Clark Field; Austin, TX	W 12–5		
October 25	Haskell	Clark Field; Austin, TX	W 45–10		
October 30	at Arkansas	The Hill; Fayetteville, AR (rivalry)	W 26–6		
November 2	at Missouri	Rollins Field; Columbia, MO	L 4–5		
November 9	Baylor	Clark Field; Austin, TX (rivalry)	W 27–11	500	
November 15	Oklahoma	Clark Field; Austin, TX (rivalry)	W 29–10		
November 28	Texas A&M	Clark Field; Austin, TX (rivalry)	W 11–6	5,500	
