= 1907 Baylor football team =

American college football season

1907 Baylor football
- Conference: Independent
- Record: 4–3–1
- Head coach: Luther Burleson (1st season)
- Captain: J. J. McCasland

1907 Southern college football independents records
	Conf.			Overall
Team	W	L	T	W		L		T
South Carolina		–		3	–	0	–	0
Stetson		–		2	–	0	–	0
Southwestern Louisiana Industrial		–		1	–	0	–	0
Mississippi College		–		1	–	0	–	0
North Carolina A&M		–		6	–	0	–	1
Louisiana Industrial		–		9	–	1	–	0
Kentucky State		–		9	–	1	–	1
Texas		–		6	–	1	–	1
Texas A&M		–		6	–	1	–	1
Davidson		–		4	–	1	–	1
Florida		–		4	–	1	–	1
Navy		–		9	–	2	–	1
VPI		–		7	–	2	–	0
Virginia		–		6	–	3	–	1
TCU		–		4	–	2	–	2
West Virginia		–		6	–	4	–	0
VMI		–		5	–	3	–	0
Tulane		–		3	–	2	–	0
Oklahoma		–		4	–	4	–	0
North Carolina		–		4	–	4	–	1
Baylor		–		4	–	3	–	1
Arkansas		–		4	–	4	–	1
Maryland		–		3	–	5	–	0
George Washington		–		2	–	4	–	1
The Citadel		–		2	–	4	–	1
Georgetown		–		2	–	4	–	1
Oklahoma A&M		–		1	–	5	–	2
Birmingham		–		1	–	3	–	0
Chattanooga		–		0	–	5	–	1
Delaware		–		0	–	5	–	1
Catholic University		–		0	–	1	–	0
Louisiana Normal		–		0	–	1	–	0
South Carolina State		–		0	–	1	–	0
Spring Hill		–		0	–	1	–	0

The 1907 Baylor football team was an American football team that represented Baylor University as an independent during the 1907 college football season. In its first season under head coach Luther Burleson, the team compiled a 4–3–1 record and was outscored by a total of 105 to 91.

Baylor's December 6 game at LSU was the team's first ever east of the Mississippi.

== Schedule ==
Date	Opponent	Site	Result	Attendance	Source
October 5	TCU	Waco, TX (rivalry)	T 6–6		
October 12	Texas School for the Deaf	Waco, TX	W 33–0		
October 19	vs. Fort Worth	Gaston Park; Dallas, TX	W 5–11		
November 9	at Texas	Clark Field; Austin, TX (rivalry)	L 11–27	500	
November 11	TCU	Waco, TX	L 10–11		
November 12	Trinity (TX)	Waco, TX	W 4–0		
November 28	TCU	Waco, TX	W 16–8		
December 6	at LSU	Baton Rouge, LA	L 0–48		

== Background ==
The trustees of the Baylor University have just abolished football games in that institution, and there will be no more intercollegiate or class games.
The roughness of the game, coupled with the tendency to unfair playing, is the reason given.

— Associated Press, May 31, 1906

The trustees of the Baylor University have just reinstated football after prohibiting the game for a year.
The student body brought strong pressure to bear, but some of the trustees were loath to permit the game. Track athletics have not proven as popular as had been hoped. The action of Baylor is interesting in view of the attitude of several other educational institutions in the state.

— Associated Press, June 4, 1907

Baylor University did not field a team in 1906. Due to the violence of football, the sport was banned by the board of trustees in May 1906.

Under student pressure and a lack of interest in the school's athletics team, the trustees lifted the ban the following year.
