= 1907 VPI football team =

American college football season

1907 VPI football
- Conference: Independent
- Record: 7–2
- Head coach: Bob Williams (1st season)
- Captain: Charles Edward Diffendal
- Home stadium: Gibboney Field

1907 Southern college football independents records
	Conf.			Overall
Team	W	L	T	W		L		T
South Carolina		–		3	–	0	–	0
Stetson		–		2	–	0	–	0
Southwestern Louisiana Industrial		–		1	–	0	–	0
Mississippi College		–		1	–	0	–	0
North Carolina A&M		–		6	–	0	–	1
Louisiana Industrial		–		9	–	1	–	0
Kentucky State		–		9	–	1	–	1
Texas		–		6	–	1	–	1
Texas A&M		–		6	–	1	–	1
Davidson		–		4	–	1	–	1
Florida		–		4	–	1	–	1
Navy		–		9	–	2	–	1
VPI		–		7	–	2	–	0
Virginia		–		6	–	3	–	1
TCU		–		4	–	2	–	2
West Virginia		–		6	–	4	–	0
VMI		–		5	–	3	–	0
Tulane		–		3	–	2	–	0
Oklahoma		–		4	–	4	–	0
North Carolina		–		4	–	4	–	1
Baylor		–		4	–	3	–	1
Arkansas		–		4	–	4	–	1
Maryland		–		3	–	5	–	0
George Washington		–		2	–	4	–	1
The Citadel		–		2	–	4	–	1
Georgetown		–		2	–	4	–	1
Oklahoma A&M		–		1	–	5	–	2
Birmingham		–		1	–	3	–	0
Chattanooga		–		0	–	5	–	1
Delaware		–		0	–	5	–	1
Catholic University		–		0	–	1	–	0
Louisiana Normal		–		0	–	1	–	0
South Carolina State		–		0	–	1	–	0
Spring Hill		–		0	–	1	–	0

The 1907 VPI football team represented Virginia Agricultural and Mechanical College and Polytechnic Institute in the 1907 college football season. The team was led by their head coach Bob Williams and finished with a record of seven wins and two losses (7–2).

== Schedule ==
Date	Time	Opponent	Site	Result	Attendance	Source
October 5		Roanoke	Gibboney Field; Blacksburg, VA	W 33–0		
October 12		Hampden–Sydney	Gibboney Field; Blacksburg, VA	W 18–0		
October 19		vs. Washington and Lee	Lynchburg, VA	W 5–0	1,400	
October 26	3:37 p.m.	vs. Davidson	Fair Grounds; Roanoke, VA	L 5–12	1,500	
November 4	3:30 p.m.	vs. Georgetown	Broad Street Park; Richmond, VA	W 20–0	1,000	
November 9	3:00 p.m.	vs. VMI	Fair Grounds; Roanoke, VA (rivalry)	W 22–0	2,500–3,000	
November 16		George Washington	Gibboney Field; Blacksburg, VA	W 34–0		
November 23		at Navy	Worden Field; Annapolis, MD	L 0–12		
November 28	3:00 p.m.	vs. North Carolina	Broad Street Park; Richmond, VA	W 20–6	6,000–7,000	

== Before the season ==
The 1906 VPI football team compiled a 5–2–2 record and were led by Sally Miles in his second season as head coach.

== Game summaries ==
=== Roanoke ===
Roanoke vs. VPI

Team	1	2	Total
Roanoke	0	0	0
• VPI	5	28	33

- Date: October 5, 1907
- Location: Gibboney Field
  Blacksburg, VA
- Referee: Sally Miles

VPI's first game of the season was a victory over Roanoke at Gibboney Field.

The starting lineup for VPI was: Huffard (left end), Diffendal (left tackle), H. Jones (left guard), Johnson (center), H. Hodgson (right guard), Breckenridge (right tackle), Varner (right end), Wilson (quarterback), Luttrell (left halfback), W. Jones (right halfback), B. Smith (fullback). The substitutes were: Alder, Billups, Brown, Cooper, Gibbs, Gravely, Hicks, V. Hodgson, James, J. Jones, Lane, Pritchard, Sheppard, Watkins and Wilkinson.

The starting lineup for Roanoke was: E. F. Gochenour (left end), W. Engleby (left tackle), J. F. Morton (left guard), B. C. Sayers (center), E. A. Carpenter (right guard), H. O. Price (right tackle), J. J. Fray (right end), M. D. Bowers (quarterback), L. L. Graybeal (left halfback), J. B. Taney (right halfback), R. M. Killey (fullback). The substitutes were: R. H. Anderson and Schreckhiser.

=== Hampden–Sydney ===
After their victory over Roanoke, VPI played Hampden–Sydney College at Gibboney Field.

=== Washington and Lee ===
Washington & Lee vs. VPI

Team	1	2	Total
W&L	0	0	0
• VPI	5	0	5

- Date: October 19, 1907
- Location: Lynchburg, VA
- Game attendance: 1,400
- Referee: Jack Gass

The starting lineup for VPI was: Huffard (left end), Diffendal (left tackle), Breckenridge (left guard), Johnson (center), H. Hodgson (right guard), Smith (right tackle), Varner (right end), Sheppard (quarterback), W. Jones (left halfback), Luttrell (right halfback), V. Hodgson (fullback).

The starting lineup for Washington and Lee was: Hiram Dow (left end), H. M. White (left tackle), William Pipes (left guard), James Larrick (center), Richard Morales (right guard), Cleon Osbourn (right tackle), Roland Waddill (right end), L. W. Wilson (quarterback), C. W. Streit (left halfback), Edward Brown (right halfback), Edwin Alderson (fullback). The substitutes were: Henry Smartt.

=== Davidson ===
Davidson vs. VPI

Team	1	2	Total
• Davidson	6	6	12
VPI	5	0	5

- Date: October 26, 1907
- Location: Fair Grounds
  Roanoke, VA
- Game start: 3:37 p.m.
- Game attendance: 1,500
- Referee: Jack Gass

The starting lineup for VPI was: Huffard (left end), Diffendal (left tackle), Breckenridge (left guard), Johnson (center), H. Hodgson (right guard), Varner (right tackle), J. Jones (right end), Sheppard (quarterback), Luttrell (left halfback), V. Hodgson (right halfback), Smith (fullback). The substitutes were: Billups, Brown, Cooper, Evans, Gibbs, Gravely, Hicks and W. Jones.

The starting lineup for Davidson was: DeWitt Kluttz (left end), W. R. Moore (left tackle), John Axford (left guard), Norman B. Edgerton (center), Daniels (right guard), LeRoy Dunn (right tackle), Wilkinson (right end), Elliott (quarterback), Clarence Clark (left halfback), Robert Denny (right halfback), William Morton (fullback). The substitutes were: John James and Tom Warlick.

=== Georgetown ===
Georgetown vs. VPI

Team	1	2	Total
Georgetown	0	0	0
• VPI	5	15	20

- Date: November 4, 1907
- Location: Broad Street Park
  Richmond, VA
- Game start: 3:30 p.m.
- Game attendance: 1,000
- Referee: Jack Gass

The starting lineup for VPI was: Huffard (left end), B. Smith (left tackle), Brown (left guard), Johnson (center), H. Hodgson (right guard), R. W. Smith (right tackle), J. Jones (right end), Sheppard (quarterback), Luttrell (left halfback), V. Hodgson (right halfback), Diffendal (fullback). The substitutes were: Billups, Cooper, Gravely and Hicks.

The starting lineup for Georgetown was: Gerhard Simon (left end), Murray (left tackle), W. G. Todd (left guard), Larry Cullen (center), Eddie Scott (right guard), Herb Munhall (right tackle), Eddie Miller (right end), Jim Cohen (quarterback), E. T. Thompson (left halfback), Edmund Fitzgerald (right halfback), George Dutcher (fullback). The substitutes were: Tom Stewart.

=== VMI ===
VMI vs. VPI

Team	1	2	Total
VMI	0	0	0
• VPI	4	18	22

- Date: November 9, 1907
- Location: Fair Grounds
  Roanoke, VA
- Game start: 3:00 p.m.
- Game attendance: 2,500–3,000
- Game weather: "ideal"
- Referee: Jack Gass

The starting lineup for VPI was: Huffard (left end), McMillan (left tackle), Brown (left guard), Johnson (center), H. Hodgson (right guard), R. W. Smith (right tackle), J. Jones (right end), Sheppard (quarterback), Luttrell (left halfback), Billups (right halfback), Gravely (fullback). The substitutes were: Breckenridge, Cooper, Diffendal, V. Hodgson and B. Smith.

The starting lineup for VMI was: William Poague (left end), John Fray (left tackle), Henry Poague (left guard), Edward Hancock (center), George Wickham (right guard), William Biedler (right tackle), George Ward (right end), John Doyle (quarterback), Robert Massie (left halfback), Porter (right halfback), George MacLean (fullback). The substitutes were: George Alexander, Richard Clemmer, R. Davant, Donald McMillen, John Minton and H. Pattison.

=== George Washington ===
George Washington vs. VPI

Team	1	2	Total
GW	0	0	0
• VPI	24	10	34

- Date: November 16, 1907
- Location: Gibboney Field
  Blacksburg, VA
- Game weather: "ideal"
- Referee: Baird

The starting lineup for VPI was: Huffard (left end), Diffendal (left tackle), Breckenridge (left guard), Johnson (center), H. Hodgson (right guard), R. W. Smith (right tackle), J. Jones (right end), Cooper (quarterback), Luttrell (left halfback), Billups (right halfback), V. Hodgson (fullback).

The starting lineup for George Washington was: James Gunning (left end), John Whitehead (left tackle), Royal Alston (left guard), John Baker (center), Patrick Holmes (right guard), Walter Sommers (right tackle), John Brooks (right end), Harry Pearce (quarterback), Edgar Hough (left halfback), Tullas (right halfback), Aubrey Witten (fullback). The substitutes were: Coudon, Phillip Hooten, William Kemeys and Herbert White.

=== Navy ===
VPI at Navy

Team	1	2	Total
VPI	0	0	0
• Navy	6	6	12

- Date: November 23, 1907
- Location: Worden Field
  Annapolis, MD
- Game weather: Rain
- Referee: Whiting (Cornell)

The starting lineup for VPI was: Huffard (left end), Diffendal (left tackle), Breckenridge (left guard), Johnson (center), H. Hodgson (right guard), R. W. Smith (right tackle), J. Jones (right end), Cooper (quarterback), Luttrell (left halfback), Billups (right halfback), V. Hodgson (fullback). The substitutes were: Alder, Gravely, Sheppard and B. Smith.

The starting lineup for Navy was: Max Demott (left end), Percy Northcroft (left tackle), Frederick Reinicke (left guard), Charles Brand (center), Percy Wright (right guard), Frank Leighton (right tackle), Bill Dague (right end), Ed Lange (quarterback), A. H. Douglas (left halfback), Lawrence Fairfax Reifsnider (right halfback), Raymond Jones (fullback). The substitutes were: Brown, Burd, Gates, Cary Magruder, Nason, W. A. Richardson, Robertson, Karl Smith, Stoer, Straus and David Stuart.

=== North Carolina ===
North Carolina vs. VPI

Team	1	2	Total
UNC	0	6	6
• VPI	8	12	20

- Date: November 28, 1907
- Location: Broad Street Park
  Richmond, VA
- Game start: 3:00 p.m.
- Game attendance: 6,000–7,000
- Referee: Jack Gass

The starting lineup for VPI was: Huffard (left end), Diffendal (left tackle), Breckenridge (left guard), Johnson (center), H. Hodgson (right guard), R. W. Smith (right tackle), B. Smith (right end), Sheppard (quarterback), Luttrell (left halfback), Billups (right halfback), V. Hodgson (fullback). The substitutes were: Brown, Cooper, Gibbs, Gravely, Hicks, H. G. Jones, J. Jones and Varner.

The starting lineup for North Carolina was: James Wiggins (left end), Cecil Garrett (left tackle), Earle Thompson (left guard), Raymond Parker (center), Robert Howell (right guard), Archie Deans (right tackle), William Thomas (right end), Joseph Mann (quarterback), Lucius Dunlap (left halfback), Thomas McNeill (right halfback), James Crosswell (fullback). The substitutes were: Harris and John Manning.

== Players ==
The following players were members of the 1907 football team according to the roster published in the 1908 edition of The Bugle, the Virginia Tech yearbook.

VPI 1907 roster
Quarterback: Edgar Seymour Sheppard; Guards: John Breckenridge; Hoss Hodgson; Tackles: Charles Edward Diffendal (Capt.); Russell Wilmer Smith; Center: Allen Burnley Johnson; Ends: Paul Phillippi Huffard; Bernard Lewis Smith	Halfbacks: Henry Evans Billups; Joseph Talmage Luttrell; Fullback: Vivian Burnett Hodgson; Substitutes: Albert Garland Alder; Brown; Joseph Harvey Cooper; Evans; Aubrey Gravatt Gibbs; William Seymour Gravely; Thomas Paret Hicks	James; Harry Guilford Jones; John Porter Jones; W. Jones; Harry Martin Lane; McMillan; Pritchard; Harry Varner; Watkins; Wilkerson; Wilson

== Coaching and training staff ==
- Head coach: Bob Williams
- Manager: Philip Haxall Noland
- Assistant manager: Jacob Lauer Baum
