= 1907 Texas A&M Aggies football team =

American college football season

1907 Texas A&M Aggies football
- Conference: Independent
- Record: 6–1–1
- Head coach: Lester Larson (1st season)
- Home stadium: Kyle Field

1907 Southern college football independents records
	Conf.			Overall
Team	W	L	T	W		L		T
South Carolina		–		3	–	0	–	0
Stetson		–		2	–	0	–	0
Southwestern Louisiana Industrial		–		1	–	0	–	0
Mississippi College		–		1	–	0	–	0
North Carolina A&M		–		6	–	0	–	1
Louisiana Industrial		–		9	–	1	–	0
Kentucky State		–		9	–	1	–	1
Texas		–		6	–	1	–	1
Texas A&M		–		6	–	1	–	1
Davidson		–		4	–	1	–	1
Florida		–		4	–	1	–	1
Navy		–		9	–	2	–	1
VPI		–		7	–	2	–	0
Virginia		–		6	–	3	–	1
TCU		–		4	–	2	–	2
West Virginia		–		6	–	4	–	0
VMI		–		5	–	3	–	0
Tulane		–		3	–	2	–	0
Oklahoma		–		4	–	4	–	0
North Carolina		–		4	–	4	–	1
Baylor		–		4	–	3	–	1
Arkansas		–		4	–	4	–	1
Maryland		–		3	–	5	–	0
George Washington		–		2	–	4	–	1
The Citadel		–		2	–	4	–	1
Georgetown		–		2	–	4	–	1
Oklahoma A&M		–		1	–	5	–	2
Birmingham		–		1	–	3	–	0
Chattanooga		–		0	–	5	–	1
Delaware		–		0	–	5	–	1
Catholic University		–		0	–	1	–	0
Louisiana Normal		–		0	–	1	–	0
South Carolina State		–		0	–	1	–	0
Spring Hill		–		0	–	1	–	0

The 1907 Texas A&M Aggies football team represented the Agricultural and Mechanical College of Texas—now known as Texas A&M University—as an independent during the 1907 college football season. Led by Lester Larson in his first and only season as head coach, the Aggies compiled a record of 6–1–1.

== Schedule ==
Date	Time	Opponent	Site	Result	Attendance	Source
October 5		Fort Worth	Kyle Field; College Station, TX	W 34–0		
October 12		vs. Texas	Gaston Park; Dallas, TX (rivalry)	T 0–0	5,000	
October 21		LSU	Kyle Field; College Station, TX (rivalry)	W 11–5		
October 28		Haskell	Kyle Field; College Station, TX	W 5–0		
November 9	4:00 p.m.	TCU	Kyle Field; College Station, TX (rivalry)	W 32–5		
November 12		Oklahoma	Kyle Field; College Station, TX	W 19–0		
November 16		at Tulane	Athletic Park; New Orleans, LA	W 18–6		
November 28		at Texas	Clark Field; Austin, TX	L 6–11	5,500	
