= 1907 Navy Midshipmen football team =

American college football season

1907 Navy Midshipmen football
- Conference: Independent
- Record: 9–2–1
- Head coach: Joseph M. Reeves (1st season)
- Captain: A. H. Douglas
- Home stadium: Worden Field

1907 Southern college football independents records
	Conf.			Overall
Team	W	L	T	W		L		T
South Carolina		–		3	–	0	–	0
Stetson		–		2	–	0	–	0
Southwestern Louisiana Industrial		–		1	–	0	–	0
Mississippi College		–		1	–	0	–	0
North Carolina A&M		–		6	–	0	–	1
Louisiana Industrial		–		9	–	1	–	0
Kentucky State		–		9	–	1	–	1
Texas		–		6	–	1	–	1
Texas A&M		–		6	–	1	–	1
Davidson		–		4	–	1	–	1
Florida		–		4	–	1	–	1
Navy		–		9	–	2	–	1
VPI		–		7	–	2	–	0
Virginia		–		6	–	3	–	1
TCU		–		4	–	2	–	2
West Virginia		–		6	–	4	–	0
VMI		–		5	–	3	–	0
Tulane		–		3	–	2	–	0
Oklahoma		–		4	–	4	–	0
North Carolina		–		4	–	4	–	1
Baylor		–		4	–	3	–	1
Arkansas		–		4	–	4	–	1
Maryland		–		3	–	5	–	0
George Washington		–		2	–	4	–	1
The Citadel		–		2	–	4	–	1
Georgetown		–		2	–	4	–	1
Oklahoma A&M		–		1	–	5	–	2
Birmingham		–		1	–	3	–	0
Chattanooga		–		0	–	5	–	1
Delaware		–		0	–	5	–	1
Catholic University		–		0	–	1	–	0
Louisiana Normal		–		0	–	1	–	0
South Carolina State		–		0	–	1	–	0
Spring Hill		–		0	–	1	–	0

The 1907 Navy Midshipmen football team represented the United States Naval Academy during the 1907 college football season. In their first and only season under Joseph M. Reeves, the Midshipmen compiled a 9–2–1 record, shut out eight opponents, and outscored all opponents by a combined score of 118 to 34. A. H. Douglas made Walter Camp's third-team All-America, the second Southerner ever to have done so.

== Schedule ==
Date	Opponent	Site	Result
October 2	St. John's (MD)	Worden Field; Annapolis, MD	W 26–0
October 5	Dickinson	Worden Field; Annapolis, MD	W 15–0
October 9	Maryland	Worden Field; Annapolis, MD (rivalry)	W 12–0
October 12	Vanderbilt	Worden Field; Annapolis, MD	T 6–6
October 16	St. John's (MD)	Worden Field; Annapolis, MD	W 12–0
October 19	Harvard	Worden Field; Annapolis, MD	L 0–6
October 26	Lafayette	Worden Field; Annapolis, MD	W 17–0
November 2	West Virginia	Worden Field; Annapolis, MD	W 6–0
November 9	Swarthmore	Worden Field; Annapolis, MD	L 0–18
November 16	Penn State	Worden Field; Annapolis, MD	W 6–4
November 23	VPI	Worden Field; Annapolis, MD	W 12–0
November 30	vs. Army	Franklin Field; Philadelphia, PA (Army–Navy Game)	W 6–0
