= 1907 West Virginia Mountaineers football team =

American college football season

1907 West Virginia Mountaineers football
- Conference: Independent
- Record: 6–4
- Head coach: Clarence W. Russell (1st season)
- Captain: Thomas Leahy

1907 Southern college football independents records
	Conf.			Overall
Team	W	L	T	W		L		T
South Carolina		–		3	–	0	–	0
Stetson		–		2	–	0	–	0
Southwestern Louisiana Industrial		–		1	–	0	–	0
Mississippi College		–		1	–	0	–	0
North Carolina A&M		–		6	–	0	–	1
Louisiana Industrial		–		9	–	1	–	0
Kentucky State		–		9	–	1	–	1
Texas		–		6	–	1	–	1
Texas A&M		–		6	–	1	–	1
Davidson		–		4	–	1	–	1
Florida		–		4	–	1	–	1
Navy		–		9	–	2	–	1
VPI		–		7	–	2	–	0
Virginia		–		6	–	3	–	1
TCU		–		4	–	2	–	2
West Virginia		–		6	–	4	–	0
VMI		–		5	–	3	–	0
Tulane		–		3	–	2	–	0
Oklahoma		–		4	–	4	–	0
North Carolina		–		4	–	4	–	1
Baylor		–		4	–	3	–	1
Arkansas		–		4	–	4	–	1
Maryland		–		3	–	5	–	0
George Washington		–		2	–	4	–	1
The Citadel		–		2	–	4	–	1
Georgetown		–		2	–	4	–	1
Oklahoma A&M		–		1	–	5	–	2
Birmingham		–		1	–	3	–	0
Chattanooga		–		0	–	5	–	1
Delaware		–		0	–	5	–	1
Catholic University		–		0	–	1	–	0
Louisiana Normal		–		0	–	1	–	0
South Carolina State		–		0	–	1	–	0
Spring Hill		–		0	–	1	–	0

The 1907 West Virginia Mountaineers football team was an American football team that represented West Virginia University as an independent during the 1907 college football season. In its first and only season under head coach Clarence W. Russell, the team compiled a 6–4 record and outscored opponents by a total of 236 to 38. Thomas Leahy was the team captain.

== Schedule ==
Date	Opponent	Site	Result	Attendance	Source
September 28	Ohio	Morgantown, WV	W 35–5		
October 2	Parkersburg YMCA	Morgantown, WV	W 55–0		
October 5	California YMCA (PA)	Morgantown, WV	W 36–0		
October 16	West Virginia Wesleyan	Morgantown, WV	W 65–0		
October 26	vs. Marietta	Parkersburg, WV	L 2–4		
November 2	at Navy	Annapolis, MD	L 0–6		
November 9	at Western University of Pennsylvania	Pittsburgh, PA (rivalry)	L 0–10	> 4,000	
November 16	Westminster (PA)	Morgantown, WV	W 27–0		
November 28	at Washington & Jefferson	Washington, PA	L 5–13		
November 29	Alumni and All-Stars	Morgantown, WV	W 11–0		
