= 1907 George Washington Hatchetites football team =

American college football season

1907 George Washington Hatchetites football
- Conference: Independent
- Record: 2–4–1
- Head coach: Fred K. Nielsen (1st season)
- Home stadium: Van Ness Park

1907 Southern college football independents records
	Conf.			Overall
Team	W	L	T	W		L		T
South Carolina		–		3	–	0	–	0
Stetson		–		2	–	0	–	0
Southwestern Louisiana Industrial		–		1	–	0	–	0
Mississippi College		–		1	–	0	–	0
North Carolina A&M		–		6	–	0	–	1
Louisiana Industrial		–		9	–	1	–	0
Kentucky State		–		9	–	1	–	1
Texas		–		6	–	1	–	1
Texas A&M		–		6	–	1	–	1
Davidson		–		4	–	1	–	1
Florida		–		4	–	1	–	1
Navy		–		9	–	2	–	1
VPI		–		7	–	2	–	0
Virginia		–		6	–	3	–	1
TCU		–		4	–	2	–	2
West Virginia		–		6	–	4	–	0
VMI		–		5	–	3	–	0
Tulane		–		3	–	2	–	0
Oklahoma		–		4	–	4	–	0
North Carolina		–		4	–	4	–	1
Baylor		–		4	–	3	–	1
Arkansas		–		4	–	4	–	1
Maryland		–		3	–	5	–	0
George Washington		–		2	–	4	–	1
The Citadel		–		2	–	4	–	1
Georgetown		–		2	–	4	–	1
Oklahoma A&M		–		1	–	5	–	2
Birmingham		–		1	–	3	–	0
Chattanooga		–		0	–	5	–	1
Delaware		–		0	–	5	–	1
Catholic University		–		0	–	1	–	0
Louisiana Normal		–		0	–	1	–	0
South Carolina State		–		0	–	1	–	0
Spring Hill		–		0	–	1	–	0

The 1907 George Washington Hatchetites Colonials football team was an American football team that represented George Washington University as an independent during the 1907 college football season. In their first season under head coach Fred K. Nielsen, the team compiled a 2–4–1 record.

== Schedule ==
Date	Opponent	Site	Result	Source
October 12	Western Maryland	Van Ness Park; Washington, DC	L 0–12	
October 19	at Swarthmore	Whittier Field; Swarthmore, PA	L 0–30	
October 26	Maryland Agricultural	Van Ness Park; Washington, DC	L 0–11	
November 4	University of Maryland, Baltimore	Van Ness Park; Washington, DC	W 17–6	
November 9	Gallaudet	Van Ness Park; Washington, DC	W 16–6	
November 16	at VPI	Gibboney Field; Blacksburg, VA	L 0–34	
November 28	at Georgetown	Georgetown Field; Washington, DC	T 0–0	
