= 1907 Delaware football team =

American college football season

1907 Delaware football
- Conference: Independent
- Record: 0–5–1
- Head coach: E. Pratt King (1st season)
- Captain: J. Frank Baldwin

1907 Southern college football independents records
	Conf.			Overall
Team	W	L	T	W		L		T
South Carolina		–		3	–	0	–	0
Stetson		–		2	–	0	–	0
Southwestern Louisiana Industrial		–		1	–	0	–	0
Mississippi College		–		1	–	0	–	0
North Carolina A&M		–		6	–	0	–	1
Louisiana Industrial		–		9	–	1	–	0
Kentucky State		–		9	–	1	–	1
Texas		–		6	–	1	–	1
Texas A&M		–		6	–	1	–	1
Davidson		–		4	–	1	–	1
Florida		–		4	–	1	–	1
Navy		–		9	–	2	–	1
VPI		–		7	–	2	–	0
Virginia		–		6	–	3	–	1
TCU		–		4	–	2	–	2
West Virginia		–		6	–	4	–	0
VMI		–		5	–	3	–	0
Tulane		–		3	–	2	–	0
Oklahoma		–		4	–	4	–	0
North Carolina		–		4	–	4	–	1
Baylor		–		4	–	3	–	1
Arkansas		–		4	–	4	–	1
Maryland		–		3	–	5	–	0
George Washington		–		2	–	4	–	1
The Citadel		–		2	–	4	–	1
Georgetown		–		2	–	4	–	1
Oklahoma A&M		–		1	–	5	–	2
Birmingham		–		1	–	3	–	0
Chattanooga		–		0	–	5	–	1
Delaware		–		0	–	5	–	1
Catholic University		–		0	–	1	–	0
Louisiana Normal		–		0	–	1	–	0
South Carolina State		–		0	–	1	–	0
Spring Hill		–		0	–	1	–	0

The 1907 Delaware football team was an American football team that represented Delaware College (later renamed the University of Delaware) as an independent during the 1907 college football season. In its first year under head coach E. Pratt King, the team compiled a 0–5–1 record.

== Schedule ==
Date	Opponent	Site	Result	Source
October 5	Williamson	Newark, DE	L 0–5	
October 12	at Haverford	Haverford, PA	L 0–12	
October 17	Western Maryland	Newark, DE	L 0–22	
October 26	Rutgers	Newark, DE	L 0–39	
November 2	at Franklin & Marshall	Lancaster, PA	L 0–28	
November 9	at Johns Hopkins	Baltimore, MD	T 0–0	
