= 1907 Maryland Aggies football team =

American college football season

1907 Maryland Aggies football
- Conference: Independent
- Record: 3–5
- Head coach: Charles W. Melick (1st season)

1907 Southern college football independents records
	Conf.			Overall
Team	W	L	T	W		L		T
South Carolina		–		3	–	0	–	0
Stetson		–		2	–	0	–	0
Southwestern Louisiana Industrial		–		1	–	0	–	0
Mississippi College		–		1	–	0	–	0
North Carolina A&M		–		6	–	0	–	1
Louisiana Industrial		–		9	–	1	–	0
Kentucky State		–		9	–	1	–	1
Texas		–		6	–	1	–	1
Texas A&M		–		6	–	1	–	1
Davidson		–		4	–	1	–	1
Florida		–		4	–	1	–	1
Navy		–		9	–	2	–	1
VPI		–		7	–	2	–	0
Virginia		–		6	–	3	–	1
TCU		–		4	–	2	–	2
West Virginia		–		6	–	4	–	0
VMI		–		5	–	3	–	0
Tulane		–		3	–	2	–	0
Oklahoma		–		4	–	4	–	0
North Carolina		–		4	–	4	–	1
Baylor		–		4	–	3	–	1
Arkansas		–		4	–	4	–	1
Maryland		–		3	–	5	–	0
George Washington		–		2	–	4	–	1
The Citadel		–		2	–	4	–	1
Georgetown		–		2	–	4	–	1
Oklahoma A&M		–		1	–	5	–	2
Birmingham		–		1	–	3	–	0
Chattanooga		–		0	–	5	–	1
Delaware		–		0	–	5	–	1
Catholic University		–		0	–	1	–	0
Louisiana Normal		–		0	–	1	–	0
South Carolina State		–		0	–	1	–	0
Spring Hill		–		0	–	1	–	0

The 1907 Maryland Aggies football team represented Maryland Agricultural College (later part of the University of Maryland) in the 1907 college football season. In their first and only season under head coach Charles W. Melick, the Aggies compiled a 3–5 record and were outscored by all opponents, 61 to 45.

== Schedule ==
Date	Opponent	Site	Result	Source
September 28	Washington Technical High School	College Park, MD	W 13–0	
October 5	at Richmond	Broad Street Park; Richmond, VA	L 5–11	
October 9	at Navy	Worden Field; Annapolis, MD	L 0–12	
October 12	at Mount St. Mary's	Emmitsburg, MD	L 6–12	
October 26	at George Washington	Van Ness Park; Washington, DC	W 11–0	
November 9	at Washington College	Chestertown, MD	W 10–5	
November 16	St. John's (MD)	College Park, MD	L 0–16	
November 23	at Gallaudet	Washington, DC	L 0–5	
