= 1907 Chattanooga Moccasins football team =

American college football season

1907 Chattanooga Moccasins football
- Conference: Independent
- Record: 0–5–1
- Head coach: Sam McAllister (1st season)
- Captain: James Hampton
- Home stadium: Olympic Park Field

1907 Southern college football independents records
	Conf.			Overall
Team	W	L	T	W		L		T
South Carolina		–		3	–	0	–	0
Stetson		–		2	–	0	–	0
Southwestern Louisiana Industrial		–		1	–	0	–	0
Mississippi College		–		1	–	0	–	0
North Carolina A&M		–		6	–	0	–	1
Louisiana Industrial		–		9	–	1	–	0
Kentucky State		–		9	–	1	–	1
Texas		–		6	–	1	–	1
Texas A&M		–		6	–	1	–	1
Davidson		–		4	–	1	–	1
Florida		–		4	–	1	–	1
Navy		–		9	–	2	–	1
VPI		–		7	–	2	–	0
Virginia		–		6	–	3	–	1
TCU		–		4	–	2	–	2
West Virginia		–		6	–	4	–	0
VMI		–		5	–	3	–	0
Tulane		–		3	–	2	–	0
Oklahoma		–		4	–	4	–	0
North Carolina		–		4	–	4	–	1
Baylor		–		4	–	3	–	1
Arkansas		–		4	–	4	–	1
Maryland		–		3	–	5	–	0
George Washington		–		2	–	4	–	1
The Citadel		–		2	–	4	–	1
Georgetown		–		2	–	4	–	1
Oklahoma A&M		–		1	–	5	–	2
Birmingham		–		1	–	3	–	0
Chattanooga		–		0	–	5	–	1
Delaware		–		0	–	5	–	1
Catholic University		–		0	–	1	–	0
Louisiana Normal		–		0	–	1	–	0
South Carolina State		–		0	–	1	–	0
Spring Hill		–		0	–	1	–	0

The 1907 Chattanooga Moccasins football team represented the University of Chattanooga—now known as the University of Tennessee at Chattanooga—as an independent during the 1907 college football season. The team finished its six-game schedule without a win, scoring only one touchdown in the entire season. A seventh game was scheduled for Thanksgiving Day, November 28, in Chattanooga against Southwestern Presbyterian of Clarksville, Tennessee. However, the game was cancelled on November 27 because of Chattanooga's poor performance on November 26 against the 12th Cavalry.

== Schedule ==
Date	Opponent	Site	Result	Source
October 12	American Temperance	Olympic Park Field; Chattanooga, TN	T 0–0	
October 19	Central University	Olympic Park Field; Chattanooga, TN	L 0–22	
November 2	at Tennessee	Chilhowee Park; Knoxville, TN	L 0–57	
November 8	at Gordon Institute	Barnesville, GA	L 0–29	
November 16	Howard (AL)	Olympic Park Field; Chattanooga, TN	L 7–21	
November 26	12th Cavalry	Olympic Park Field; Chattanooga, TN	L 0–11	
