= 1907 Arkansas Razorbacks football team =

American college football season

1907 Arkansas Razorbacks football
- Conference: Independent
- Record: 4–4–1
- Head coach: Frank Longman (2nd season)
- Captain: Clinton Milford
- Home stadium: The Hill

1907 Southern college football independents records
	Conf.			Overall
Team	W	L	T	W		L		T
South Carolina		–		3	–	0	–	0
Stetson		–		2	–	0	–	0
Southwestern Louisiana Industrial		–		1	–	0	–	0
Mississippi College		–		1	–	0	–	0
North Carolina A&M		–		6	–	0	–	1
Louisiana Industrial		–		9	–	1	–	0
Kentucky State		–		9	–	1	–	1
Texas		–		6	–	1	–	1
Texas A&M		–		6	–	1	–	1
Davidson		–		4	–	1	–	1
Florida		–		4	–	1	–	1
Navy		–		9	–	2	–	1
VPI		–		7	–	2	–	0
Virginia		–		6	–	3	–	1
TCU		–		4	–	2	–	2
West Virginia		–		6	–	4	–	0
VMI		–		5	–	3	–	0
Tulane		–		3	–	2	–	0
Oklahoma		–		4	–	4	–	0
North Carolina		–		4	–	4	–	1
Baylor		–		4	–	3	–	1
Arkansas		–		4	–	4	–	1
Maryland		–		3	–	5	–	0
George Washington		–		2	–	4	–	1
The Citadel		–		2	–	4	–	1
Georgetown		–		2	–	4	–	1
Oklahoma A&M		–		1	–	5	–	2
Birmingham		–		1	–	3	–	0
Chattanooga		–		0	–	5	–	1
Delaware		–		0	–	5	–	1
Catholic University		–		0	–	1	–	0
Louisiana Normal		–		0	–	1	–	0
South Carolina State		–		0	–	1	–	0
Spring Hill		–		0	–	1	–	0

The 1907 Arkansas Razorbacks football team represented the University of Arkansas during the 1907 college football season. In their second and final season under head coach Frank Longman, the Razorbacks compiled a 4–4–1 record and were outscored by their opponents by a combined total of 110 to 73. Although team lore suggests that the program adopted the "Razorbacks" nickname in 1910, evidence shows that the nickname was already in use during the 1907 season.

== Schedule ==
Date	Time	Opponent	Site	Result	Source
September 28		Haskell	The Hill; Fayetteville, AR	T 0–0	
October 8		Drury	The Hill; Fayetteville, AR	W 23–0	
October 14		at Drury	Springfield, MO	W 17–6	
October 19	3:00 p.m.	at Saint Louis	Sportsman's Park; St. Louis, MO	L 6–42	
October 30		Texas	The Hill; Fayetteville, AR (rivalry)	L 6–26	
November 6		at LSU	State Field; Baton Rouge, LA (rivalry)	L 12–17	
November 9		at Tulane	Athletic Park; New Orleans, LA	W 17–12	
November 18		Tennessee	West End Park; Little Rock, AR	L 2–14	
November 28		Missouri Mines	The Hill; Fayetteville, AR	W 7–5	
