= 1907 Stetson Hatters football team =

American college football season

1907 Stetson Hatters football
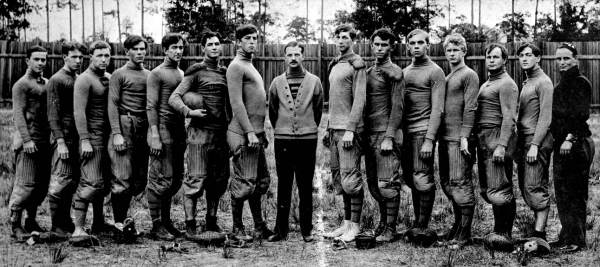

State co-champion
- Conference: Independent
- Record: 2–0
- Head coach: Litchfield Colton (4th season)

1907 Southern college football independents records
| | Conf. | | | Overall |
| Team | W | L | T | W | | L | | T |
|---|---|---|---|---|---|---|---|---|
| South Carolina | | – | | 3 | – | 0 | – | 0 |
| Stetson | | – | | 2 | – | 0 | – | 0 |
| Southwestern Louisiana Industrial | | – | | 1 | – | 0 | – | 0 |
| Mississippi College | | – | | 1 | – | 0 | – | 0 |
| North Carolina A&M | | – | | 6 | – | 0 | – | 1 |
| Louisiana Industrial | | – | | 9 | – | 1 | – | 0 |
| Kentucky State | | – | | 9 | – | 1 | – | 1 |
| Texas | | – | | 6 | – | 1 | – | 1 |
| Texas A&M | | – | | 6 | – | 1 | – | 1 |
| Davidson | | – | | 4 | – | 1 | – | 1 |
| Florida | | – | | 4 | – | 1 | – | 1 |
| Navy | | – | | 9 | – | 2 | – | 1 |
| VPI | | – | | 7 | – | 2 | – | 0 |
| Virginia | | – | | 6 | – | 3 | – | 1 |
| TCU | | – | | 4 | – | 2 | – | 2 |
| West Virginia | | – | | 6 | – | 4 | – | 0 |
| VMI | | – | | 5 | – | 3 | – | 0 |
| Tulane | | – | | 3 | – | 2 | – | 0 |
| Oklahoma | | – | | 4 | – | 4 | – | 0 |
| North Carolina | | – | | 4 | – | 4 | – | 1 |
| Baylor | | – | | 4 | – | 3 | – | 1 |
| Arkansas | | – | | 4 | – | 4 | – | 1 |
| Maryland | | – | | 3 | – | 5 | – | 0 |
| George Washington | | – | | 2 | – | 4 | – | 1 |
| The Citadel | | – | | 2 | – | 4 | – | 1 |
| Georgetown | | – | | 2 | – | 4 | – | 1 |
| Oklahoma A&M | | – | | 1 | – | 5 | – | 2 |
| Birmingham | | – | | 1 | – | 3 | – | 0 |
| Chattanooga | | – | | 0 | – | 5 | – | 1 |
| Delaware | | – | | 0 | – | 5 | – | 1 |
| Catholic University | | – | | 0 | – | 1 | – | 0 |
| Louisiana Normal | | – | | 0 | – | 1 | – | 0 |
| South Carolina State | | – | | 0 | – | 1 | – | 0 |
| Spring Hill | | – | | 0 | – | 1 | – | 0 |

The 1907 Stetson Hatters football team represented the private Stetson College in the sport of American football during the 1907 college football season.

== Schedule ==
| Date | Opponent | Site | Result |
|---|---|---|---|
| November 16 | Rollins | Deland, FL | W 6–0 |
| November 23 | at Rollins | Winter Park, FL | W 4–0 |
