= 1907 Virginia Orange and Blue football team =

American college football season

1907 Virginia Orange and Blue football
- Conference: Independent
- Record: 6–3–1
- Head coach: Hammond Johnson (1st season)
- Captain: John Neff
- Home stadium: Madison Hall Field

1907 Southern college football independents records
| | Conf. | | | Overall |
| Team | W | L | T | W | | L | | T |
|---|---|---|---|---|---|---|---|---|
| South Carolina | | – | | 3 | – | 0 | – | 0 |
| Stetson | | – | | 2 | – | 0 | – | 0 |
| Southwestern Louisiana Industrial | | – | | 1 | – | 0 | – | 0 |
| Mississippi College | | – | | 1 | – | 0 | – | 0 |
| North Carolina A&M | | – | | 6 | – | 0 | – | 1 |
| Louisiana Industrial | | – | | 9 | – | 1 | – | 0 |
| Kentucky State | | – | | 9 | – | 1 | – | 1 |
| Texas | | – | | 6 | – | 1 | – | 1 |
| Texas A&M | | – | | 6 | – | 1 | – | 1 |
| Davidson | | – | | 4 | – | 1 | – | 1 |
| Florida | | – | | 4 | – | 1 | – | 1 |
| Navy | | – | | 9 | – | 2 | – | 1 |
| VPI | | – | | 7 | – | 2 | – | 0 |
| Virginia | | – | | 6 | – | 3 | – | 1 |
| TCU | | – | | 4 | – | 2 | – | 2 |
| West Virginia | | – | | 6 | – | 4 | – | 0 |
| VMI | | – | | 5 | – | 3 | – | 0 |
| Tulane | | – | | 3 | – | 2 | – | 0 |
| Oklahoma | | – | | 4 | – | 4 | – | 0 |
| North Carolina | | – | | 4 | – | 4 | – | 1 |
| Baylor | | – | | 4 | – | 3 | – | 1 |
| Arkansas | | – | | 4 | – | 4 | – | 1 |
| Maryland | | – | | 3 | – | 5 | – | 0 |
| George Washington | | – | | 2 | – | 4 | – | 1 |
| The Citadel | | – | | 2 | – | 4 | – | 1 |
| Georgetown | | – | | 2 | – | 4 | – | 1 |
| Oklahoma A&M | | – | | 1 | – | 5 | – | 2 |
| Birmingham | | – | | 1 | – | 3 | – | 0 |
| Chattanooga | | – | | 0 | – | 5 | – | 1 |
| Delaware | | – | | 0 | – | 5 | – | 1 |
| Catholic University | | – | | 0 | – | 1 | – | 0 |
| Louisiana Normal | | – | | 0 | – | 1 | – | 0 |
| South Carolina State | | – | | 0 | – | 1 | – | 0 |
| Spring Hill | | – | | 0 | – | 1 | – | 0 |

The 1907 Virginia Orange and Blue football team represented the University of Virginia as an independent during the 1907 college football season. Led by Hammond Johnson in his first and only season as head coach, the Orange and Blue compiled a record of 6–3–1.

== Schedule ==
| Date | Time | Opponent | Site | Result | Attendance | Source |
|---|---|---|---|---|---|---|
| September 27 | | Davidson | Madison Hall Field; Charlottesville, VA | T 5–5 | | |
| October 2 | 3:00 p.m. | Richmond | Lambeth Field; Charlottesville, VA | W 38–0 | | |
| October 5 | | St. John's (MD) | Madison Hall Field; Charlottesville, VA | W 22–4 | | |
| October 12 | | Gallaudet | Madison Hall Field; Charlottesville, VA | W 40–0 | | |
| October 19 | | VMI | Madison Hall Field; Charlottesville, VA | W 18–17 | | |
| October 26 | 3:00 p.m. | vs. North Carolina | Broad Street Park; Richmond, VA (South's Oldest Rivalry) | W 9–4 | | |
| November 2 | | vs. Sewanee | Lafayette Field; Norfolk, VA | L 0–12 | 1,000 | |
| November 9 | | Washington and Lee | Madison Hall Field; Charlottesville, VA | L 5–6 | | |
| November 16 | 3:30 p.m. | at Georgetown | Georgetown Field; Washington, DC | W 28–6 | | |
| November 28 | 2:30 p.m. | vs. North Carolina A&M | Lafayette Field; Norfolk, VA | L 4–10 | 12,000 | |
