= 1907 North Carolina Tar Heels football team =

American college football season

1907 North Carolina Tar Heels football
- Conference: Independent
- Record: 4–4–1
- Head coach: Otis Lamson (1st season)
- Captain: Joseph S. Mann
- Home stadium: Campus Athletic Field (II)

1907 Southern college football independents records
	Conf.			Overall
Team	W	L	T	W		L		T
South Carolina		–		3	–	0	–	0
Stetson		–		2	–	0	–	0
Southwestern Louisiana Industrial		–		1	–	0	–	0
Mississippi College		–		1	–	0	–	0
North Carolina A&M		–		6	–	0	–	1
Louisiana Industrial		–		9	–	1	–	0
Kentucky State		–		9	–	1	–	1
Texas		–		6	–	1	–	1
Texas A&M		–		6	–	1	–	1
Davidson		–		4	–	1	–	1
Florida		–		4	–	1	–	1
Navy		–		9	–	2	–	1
VPI		–		7	–	2	–	0
Virginia		–		6	–	3	–	1
TCU		–		4	–	2	–	2
West Virginia		–		6	–	4	–	0
VMI		–		5	–	3	–	0
Tulane		–		3	–	2	–	0
Oklahoma		–		4	–	4	–	0
North Carolina		–		4	–	4	–	1
Baylor		–		4	–	3	–	1
Arkansas		–		4	–	4	–	1
Maryland		–		3	–	5	–	0
George Washington		–		2	–	4	–	1
The Citadel		–		2	–	4	–	1
Georgetown		–		2	–	4	–	1
Oklahoma A&M		–		1	–	5	–	2
Birmingham		–		1	–	3	–	0
Chattanooga		–		0	–	5	–	1
Delaware		–		0	–	5	–	1
Catholic University		–		0	–	1	–	0
Louisiana Normal		–		0	–	1	–	0
South Carolina State		–		0	–	1	–	0
Spring Hill		–		0	–	1	–	0

The 1907 North Carolina Tar Heels football team represented the University of North Carolina and indepdepent during the 1907 college football season. Led by Otis Lamson in his first and only season as head coach, North Carolina compiled a record of 4–4–1. The team's captain was Joseph S. Mann.

== Schedule ==
Date	Time	Opponent	Site	Result	Attendance	Source
September 28	3:00 p.m.	at Penn	Franklin Field; Philadelphia, PA	L 0–37		
October 5	3:35 p.m.	Washington & Lee	Casino Park; Newport News, VA	T 0–0	2,000	
October 12		Oak Ridge Military Academy	Campus Athletic Field (II); Chapel Hill, NC	W 38–0		
October 19		William & Mary	Campus Athletic Field (II); Chapel Hill, NC	W 14–0		
October 26	3:00 p.m.	vs. Virginia	Broad Street Park (I); Richmond, VA (South's Oldest Rivalry)	L 4–9	5,000	
October 31	11:00 a.m.	vs. Clemson	State Fairgrounds; Columbia, SC	L 6–15		
November 9	4:00 p.m.	at Georgetown	Georgetown Field; Washington, DC	W 12–5		
November 16		Richmond	Campus Athletic Field (II); Chapel Hill, NC	W 13–11		
November 28	3:00 p.m.	vs. VPI	Broad Street Park (I); Richmond, VA	L 0–40	5,000	
