= 1907 Georgetown Blue and Gray football team =

American college football season

1907 Georgetown Blue and Gray football
- Conference: Independent
- Record: 3–3–1
- Head coach: Joe Reilly (4th season)
- Captain: George Dutcher
- Home stadium: Georgetown Field

1907 Southern college football independents records
	Conf.			Overall
Team	W	L	T	W		L		T
South Carolina		–		3	–	0	–	0
Stetson		–		2	–	0	–	0
Southwestern Louisiana Industrial		–		1	–	0	–	0
Mississippi College		–		1	–	0	–	0
North Carolina A&M		–		6	–	0	–	1
Louisiana Industrial		–		9	–	1	–	0
Kentucky State		–		9	–	1	–	1
Texas		–		6	–	1	–	1
Texas A&M		–		6	–	1	–	1
Davidson		–		4	–	1	–	1
Florida		–		4	–	1	–	1
Navy		–		9	–	2	–	1
VPI		–		7	–	2	–	0
Virginia		–		6	–	3	–	1
TCU		–		4	–	2	–	2
West Virginia		–		6	–	4	–	0
VMI		–		5	–	3	–	0
Tulane		–		3	–	2	–	0
Oklahoma		–		4	–	4	–	0
North Carolina		–		4	–	4	–	1
Baylor		–		4	–	3	–	1
Arkansas		–		4	–	4	–	1
Maryland		–		3	–	5	–	0
George Washington		–		2	–	4	–	1
The Citadel		–		2	–	4	–	1
Georgetown		–		2	–	4	–	1
Oklahoma A&M		–		1	–	5	–	2
Birmingham		–		1	–	3	–	0
Chattanooga		–		0	–	5	–	1
Delaware		–		0	–	5	–	1
Catholic University		–		0	–	1	–	0
Louisiana Normal		–		0	–	1	–	0
South Carolina State		–		0	–	1	–	0
Spring Hill		–		0	–	1	–	0

The 1907 Georgetown Blue and Gray football team represented Georgetown University during the 1907 college football season. Led by Joe Reilly in his fourth year as head coach, the team went 3–3–1.

== Schedule ==
Date	Time	Opponent	Site	Result	Attendance	Source
October 5		Gallaudet	Georgetown Field; Washington, DC	W 5–0		
October 19		University of Maryland, Baltimore	Georgetown Field; Washington, DC	W 10–0		
October 26		Fordham	Georgetown Field; Washington, DC	W 35-0		
November 4	3:30 p.m.	vs. VPI	Broad Street Park; Richmond, VA	L 0–20	1,000	
November 9		North Carolina	Georgetown Field; Washington, DC	L 5–12		
November 16	3:30 p.m.	Virginia	Georgetown Field; Washington, DC	L 6–28		
November 28		George Washington	National Park; Washington, DC	T 0–0	7,000	
