= 1907 Tulane Olive and Blue football team =

American college football season

1907 Tulane Olive and Blue football
- Conference: Independent
- Record: 3–2
- Head coach: Joe Curtis (1st season)
- Captain: Clyde Webb
- Home stadium: Athletic Park

1907 Southern college football independents records
	Conf.			Overall
Team	W	L	T	W		L		T
South Carolina		–		3	–	0	–	0
Stetson		–		2	–	0	–	0
Southwestern Louisiana Industrial		–		1	–	0	–	0
Mississippi College		–		1	–	0	–	0
North Carolina A&M		–		6	–	0	–	1
Louisiana Industrial		–		9	–	1	–	0
Kentucky State		–		9	–	1	–	1
Texas		–		6	–	1	–	1
Texas A&M		–		6	–	1	–	1
Davidson		–		4	–	1	–	1
Florida		–		4	–	1	–	1
Navy		–		9	–	2	–	1
VPI		–		7	–	2	–	0
Virginia		–		6	–	3	–	1
TCU		–		4	–	2	–	2
West Virginia		–		6	–	4	–	0
VMI		–		5	–	3	–	0
Tulane		–		3	–	2	–	0
Oklahoma		–		4	–	4	–	0
North Carolina		–		4	–	4	–	1
Baylor		–		4	–	3	–	1
Arkansas		–		4	–	4	–	1
Maryland		–		3	–	5	–	0
George Washington		–		2	–	4	–	1
The Citadel		–		2	–	4	–	1
Georgetown		–		2	–	4	–	1
Oklahoma A&M		–		1	–	5	–	2
Birmingham		–		1	–	3	–	0
Chattanooga		–		0	–	5	–	1
Delaware		–		0	–	5	–	1
Catholic University		–		0	–	1	–	0
Louisiana Normal		–		0	–	1	–	0
South Carolina State		–		0	–	1	–	0
Spring Hill		–		0	–	1	–	0

The 1907 Tulane Olive and Blue football team was an American football team that represented Tulane University as an independent during the 1907 college football season. In their first year under head coach Joe Curtis, the team compiled an overall record of 3–2.

== Schedule ==
Date	Opponent	Site	Result	Source
October 26	Howard (AL)	Athletic Park; New Orleans, LA	W 13–0	
November 2	Drury	Athletic Park; New Orleans, LA	W 12–0	
November 5	Central University	Athletic Park; New Orleans, LA	W 28–9	
November 9	Arkansas	Athletic Park; New Orleans, LA	L 12–17	
November 16	Texas A&M	Athletic Park; New Orleans, LA	L 6–18	
