= 1907 Oklahoma Sooners football team =

American college football season

1907 Oklahoma Sooners football
- Conference: Independent
- Record: 4–4
- Head coach: Bennie Owen (3rd season)
- Captain: Bill Cross
- Home stadium: Boyd Field

1907 Southern college football independents records
| | Conf. | | | Overall |
| Team | W | L | T | W | | L | | T |
|---|---|---|---|---|---|---|---|---|
| South Carolina | | – | | 3 | – | 0 | – | 0 |
| Stetson | | – | | 2 | – | 0 | – | 0 |
| Southwestern Louisiana Industrial | | – | | 1 | – | 0 | – | 0 |
| Mississippi College | | – | | 1 | – | 0 | – | 0 |
| North Carolina A&M | | – | | 6 | – | 0 | – | 1 |
| Louisiana Industrial | | – | | 9 | – | 1 | – | 0 |
| Kentucky State | | – | | 9 | – | 1 | – | 1 |
| Texas | | – | | 6 | – | 1 | – | 1 |
| Texas A&M | | – | | 6 | – | 1 | – | 1 |
| Davidson | | – | | 4 | – | 1 | – | 1 |
| Florida | | – | | 4 | – | 1 | – | 1 |
| Navy | | – | | 9 | – | 2 | – | 1 |
| VPI | | – | | 7 | – | 2 | – | 0 |
| Virginia | | – | | 6 | – | 3 | – | 1 |
| TCU | | – | | 4 | – | 2 | – | 2 |
| West Virginia | | – | | 6 | – | 4 | – | 0 |
| VMI | | – | | 5 | – | 3 | – | 0 |
| Tulane | | – | | 3 | – | 2 | – | 0 |
| Oklahoma | | – | | 4 | – | 4 | – | 0 |
| North Carolina | | – | | 4 | – | 4 | – | 1 |
| Baylor | | – | | 4 | – | 3 | – | 1 |
| Arkansas | | – | | 4 | – | 4 | – | 1 |
| Maryland | | – | | 3 | – | 5 | – | 0 |
| George Washington | | – | | 2 | – | 4 | – | 1 |
| The Citadel | | – | | 2 | – | 4 | – | 1 |
| Georgetown | | – | | 2 | – | 4 | – | 1 |
| Oklahoma A&M | | – | | 1 | – | 5 | – | 2 |
| Birmingham | | – | | 1 | – | 3 | – | 0 |
| Chattanooga | | – | | 0 | – | 5 | – | 1 |
| Delaware | | – | | 0 | – | 5 | – | 1 |
| Catholic University | | – | | 0 | – | 1 | – | 0 |
| Louisiana Normal | | – | | 0 | – | 1 | – | 0 |
| South Carolina State | | – | | 0 | – | 1 | – | 0 |
| Spring Hill | | – | | 0 | – | 1 | – | 0 |

The 1907 Oklahoma Sooners football team represented the University of Oklahoma as an independent during the 1907 college football season. In their third year under head coach Bennie Owen, the Sooners compiled a 4–4 record, and outscored their opponents by a combined total of 181 to 95. Statehood came to Oklahoma on November 16.

== Schedule ==
| Date | Opponent | Site | Result | Attendance | Source |
|---|---|---|---|---|---|
| October 4 | Kingfisher | Boyd Field; Norman, Oklahoma Territory | W 32–0 | | |
| October 11 | at Chilocco | Arkansas City field; Arkansas City, KS | W 43–0 | | |
| October 19 | Kansas | Boyd Field; Norman, Oklahoma Territory | L 0–15 | 1,400 | |
| October 25 | at Epworth | Oklahoma City, Oklahoma Territory | W 29–0 | | |
| November 9 | Oklahoma A&M | Boyd Field; Norman, Oklahoma Territory (rivalry) | W 67–0 | | |
| November 12 | at Texas A&M | Kyle Field; College Station, TX | L 0–19 | | |
| November 15 | at Texas | Clark Field; Austin, TX (rivalry) | L 10–29 | | |
| November 28 | Washburn | Boyd Field; Norman, OK | L 0–12 | | |

== Roster ==
1907 Oklahoma Sooners football
| Owen Acton; Fred Allen; Charles Armstrong; Howard Browne; Ralph Campbell | W. J. Cross; William Lemon; Frank Long; Harry Price; Earle Radcliffe | Jim Rogers; Vernon Walling; Charles W. Wantland; Key Wolf |
