= 1907 Florida football team =

American college football season

1907 Florida football
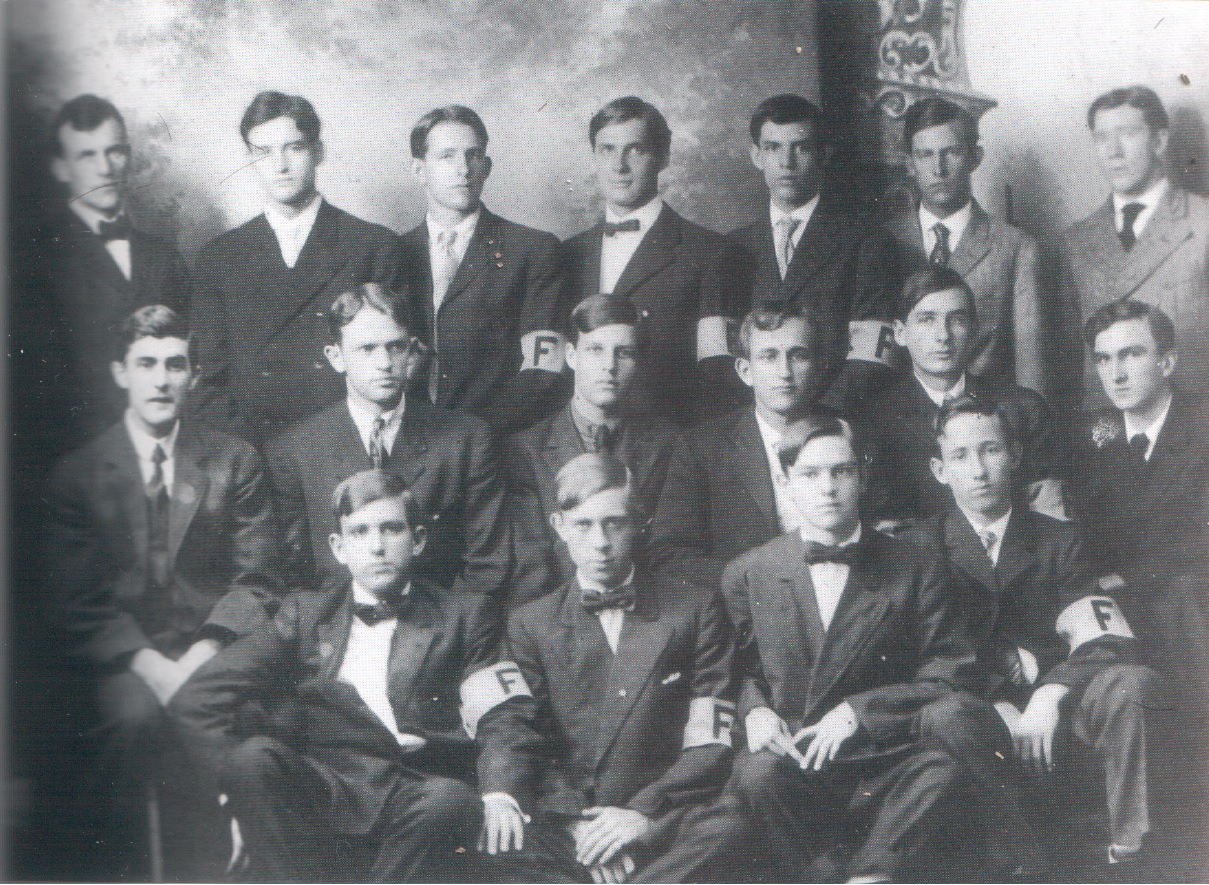

State co-champion
- Conference: Independent
- Record: 4–1–1
- Head coach: Jack Forsythe (2nd season)
- Offensive scheme: Minnesota shift
- Captain: Roy W. Corbett
- Home stadium: The Ballpark

1907 Southern college football independents records
	Conf.			Overall
Team	W	L	T	W		L		T
South Carolina		–		3	–	0	–	0
Stetson		–		2	–	0	–	0
Southwestern Louisiana Industrial		–		1	–	0	–	0
Mississippi College		–		1	–	0	–	0
North Carolina A&M		–		6	–	0	–	1
Louisiana Industrial		–		9	–	1	–	0
Kentucky State		–		9	–	1	–	1
Texas		–		6	–	1	–	1
Texas A&M		–		6	–	1	–	1
Davidson		–		4	–	1	–	1
Florida		–		4	–	1	–	1
Navy		–		9	–	2	–	1
VPI		–		7	–	2	–	0
Virginia		–		6	–	3	–	1
TCU		–		4	–	2	–	2
West Virginia		–		6	–	4	–	0
VMI		–		5	–	3	–	0
Tulane		–		3	–	2	–	0
Oklahoma		–		4	–	4	–	0
North Carolina		–		4	–	4	–	1
Baylor		–		4	–	3	–	1
Arkansas		–		4	–	4	–	1
Maryland		–		3	–	5	–	0
George Washington		–		2	–	4	–	1
The Citadel		–		2	–	4	–	1
Georgetown		–		2	–	4	–	1
Oklahoma A&M		–		1	–	5	–	2
Birmingham		–		1	–	3	–	0
Chattanooga		–		0	–	5	–	1
Delaware		–		0	–	5	–	1
Catholic University		–		0	–	1	–	0
Louisiana Normal		–		0	–	1	–	0
South Carolina State		–		0	–	1	–	0
Spring Hill		–		0	–	1	–	0

The 1907 Florida football team represented the University of Florida during the 1907 college football season. The season was Jack Forsythe's second as the head coach of the University of Florida football team. The Orange and Blue lost to the Mercer Bears for the second season in a row, beat the Rollins College Tars in Gainesville, Florida, and tied the Tars on their home field in Winter Park, Florida. Forsythe's 1907 Florida football team posted an overall record of 4–1–1 in their second varsity season.

== Before the season ==
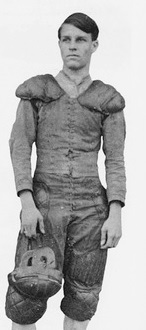
Roy Corbett

Only four men from the 1906 team returned. Captain Roy Corbett was also the athletics editor of the Florida Pennant. The team featured newcomer William A. Shands, future state senator and namesake of Shands Hospital.

== Schedule ==
Date	Opponent	Site	Result
October 12	at Mercer	Macon, GA	L 0–6
October 26	at Columbia Agricultural College	Savannah, GA	W 6–0
November 9?	Rollins	The Ballpark; Gainesville, FL	W 9–4
November 16	at Riverside Athletic Club	Jacksonville, FL	W 21–0
November 28	Riverside Athletic Club	The Ballpark; Gainesville, FL	W 17–0
November 30?	at Rollins	Winter Park, FL	T 0–0

== Game summaries ==
=== Mercer ===
The season opened with the Mercer Baptists beating Florida 6–0. Sam Jameson, son of Mercer president S. Y. Jameson, sustained a broken collarbone while tackling a Florida player. Mercer scored on a blocked kick.

=== Columbia ===
Team	1	2	Total
• Florida	0	6	6
Columbia	0	0	0

- Location: Savannah, GA
- Game attendance: 600+

Next, Florida gained a 6–0 upset win over Columbia Agricultural College of Savannah. (Note: A team photo is captioned "We licked Savannah 6 - 0. Hallelujah!!!") After a scoreless first half, Roy Corbett ran 65 yards to set up a touchdown run by coach Forsythe. Forsythe also averaged 45 yards per punt. The win led to a parade in the streets.

=== Rollins (first game) ===
Team	1	2	Total
Rollins	4	0	4
• Florida	0	9	9

- Location: Gainesville, FL

Against the Rollins Tars, Florida won 9–4. Merchants in Gainesville closed the stores from 3 to 4:30 p. m. to allow their workers to attend a State Championship game. "Grit" Gibbs played with a fever which turned out to be malaria.

Clarence Boyer made a placekick in the first half for Rollins. In the second, Florida got a touchdown on an 8-yard run by Jim Shands and a 35-yard drop kick from Mal Haughton.

=== Riverside A. C. (first game) ===
Florida beat the Riverside Athletic Club 21–0 in Jacksonville. Forsythe repeatedly ran for gains.

=== Riverside A. C. (rematch) ===
In a rematch, Florida beat the Riverside Athletic Club 17–0 in Gainesville.

=== Rollins (rematch) ===
In a rematch, Florida fought Rollins to a scoreless tie in Winter Park.

== Postseason ==
Both Florida and Stetson claimed state titles. (Note: Another Florida team picture is captioned "Champions of Florida '07".)

== Bibliography ==
- Carlson, Norm (2007). University of Florida Football Vault: The History of the Florida Gators. Atlanta, Georgia: Whitman Publishing, LLC. ISBN 0-7948-2298-3.
- McCarthy, Kevin M (2000). Fightin' Gators: A History of University of Florida Football. Mount Pleasant, South Carolina: Arcadia Publishing. ISBN 978-0-7385-0559-6.
- McEwen, Tom (1974). The Gators: A Story of Florida Football. Huntsville, Alabama: The Strode Publishers. ISBN 0-87397-025-X.
