= 1907 Davidson football team =

American college football season

1907 Davidson football
- Conference: Independent
- Record: 4–1–1
- Head coach: Robert S. Graham (2nd season); John Beverly Pollard
- Home stadium: Sprunt Athletic Field

1907 Southern college football independents records
	Conf.			Overall
Team	W	L	T	W		L		T
South Carolina		–		3	–	0	–	0
Stetson		–		2	–	0	–	0
Southwestern Louisiana Industrial		–		1	–	0	–	0
Mississippi College		–		1	–	0	–	0
North Carolina A&M		–		6	–	0	–	1
Louisiana Industrial		–		9	–	1	–	0
Kentucky State		–		9	–	1	–	1
Texas		–		6	–	1	–	1
Texas A&M		–		6	–	1	–	1
Davidson		–		4	–	1	–	1
Florida		–		4	–	1	–	1
Navy		–		9	–	2	–	1
VPI		–		7	–	2	–	0
Virginia		–		6	–	3	–	1
TCU		–		4	–	2	–	2
West Virginia		–		6	–	4	–	0
VMI		–		5	–	3	–	0
Tulane		–		3	–	2	–	0
Oklahoma		–		4	–	4	–	0
North Carolina		–		4	–	4	–	1
Baylor		–		4	–	3	–	1
Arkansas		–		4	–	4	–	1
Maryland		–		3	–	5	–	0
George Washington		–		2	–	4	–	1
The Citadel		–		2	–	4	–	1
Georgetown		–		2	–	4	–	1
Oklahoma A&M		–		1	–	5	–	2
Birmingham		–		1	–	3	–	0
Chattanooga		–		0	–	5	–	1
Delaware		–		0	–	5	–	1
Catholic University		–		0	–	1	–	0
Louisiana Normal		–		0	–	1	–	0
South Carolina State		–		0	–	1	–	0
Spring Hill		–		0	–	1	–	0

The 1907 Davidson football team was an American football team that represented the Davidson College as an independent during the 1907 college football season. In their second year under head coaches Robert S. Graham and John Beverly Pollard, the team compiled a 4–1–1 record.

== Schedule ==
Date	Opponent	Site	Result	Attendance	Source
September 27	at Virginia	Madison Hall Field; Charlottesville, VA	T 5–5		
October 5	Oak Ridge Institute	Sprunt Athletic Field; Davidson, NC	W 36–0		
October 26	vs. VPI	Fair Grounds; Roanoke, VA	W 12–5	1,500	
November 9	at Clemson	Bowman Field; Calhoun, SC	W 10–6		
November 16	vs. North Carolina A&M	Latta Park; Charlotte, NC	L 0–6	2,000	
November 28	vs. VMI	Fair Grounds; Roanoke, VA	W 10–6		
