= 1907 South Carolina Gamecocks football team =

American college football season

1907 South Carolina Gamecocks football
- Conference: Independent
- Record: 3–0
- Head coach: Douglas McKay (1st season)
- Captain: L. W. Perrin
- Home stadium: Davis Field

1907 Southern college football independents records
	Conf.			Overall
Team	W	L	T	W		L		T
South Carolina		–		3	–	0	–	0
Stetson		–		2	–	0	–	0
Southwestern Louisiana Industrial		–		1	–	0	–	0
Mississippi College		–		1	–	0	–	0
North Carolina A&M		–		6	–	0	–	1
Louisiana Industrial		–		9	–	1	–	0
Kentucky State		–		9	–	1	–	1
Texas		–		6	–	1	–	1
Texas A&M		–		6	–	1	–	1
Davidson		–		4	–	1	–	1
Florida		–		4	–	1	–	1
Navy		–		9	–	2	–	1
VPI		–		7	–	2	–	0
Virginia		–		6	–	3	–	1
TCU		–		4	–	2	–	2
West Virginia		–		6	–	4	–	0
VMI		–		5	–	3	–	0
Tulane		–		3	–	2	–	0
Oklahoma		–		4	–	4	–	0
North Carolina		–		4	–	4	–	1
Baylor		–		4	–	3	–	1
Arkansas		–		4	–	4	–	1
Maryland		–		3	–	5	–	0
George Washington		–		2	–	4	–	1
The Citadel		–		2	–	4	–	1
Georgetown		–		2	–	4	–	1
Oklahoma A&M		–		1	–	5	–	2
Birmingham		–		1	–	3	–	0
Chattanooga		–		0	–	5	–	1
Delaware		–		0	–	5	–	1
Catholic University		–		0	–	1	–	0
Louisiana Normal		–		0	–	1	–	0
South Carolina State		–		0	–	1	–	0
Spring Hill		–		0	–	1	–	0

The 1907 South Carolina Gamecocks football team represented the University of South Carolina as an independent during the 1907 college football season. Led by Douglas McKay in his first and only season as head coach, South Carolina compiled a record of 3–0. This remains the only unbeaten season in program history.

== Schedule ==
Date	Opponent	Site	Result	Source
November 16	College of Charleston	Davis Field; Columbia, SC	W 14–4	
November 21	Medical College of Georgia	Columbia, SC	W 4–0	
November 28	at The Citadel	Charleston, SC	W 12–0	
