= 1907 Spring Hill Badgers football team =

American college football season

1907 Spring Hill Badgers football
- Conference: Independent
- Record: 0–1
- Head coach: E. G. Maxon (1st season)
- Captain: Walsh

1907 Southern college football independents records
	Conf.			Overall
Team	W	L	T	W		L		T
South Carolina		–		3	–	0	–	0
Stetson		–		2	–	0	–	0
Southwestern Louisiana Industrial		–		1	–	0	–	0
Mississippi College		–		1	–	0	–	0
North Carolina A&M		–		6	–	0	–	1
Louisiana Industrial		–		9	–	1	–	0
Kentucky State		–		9	–	1	–	1
Texas		–		6	–	1	–	1
Texas A&M		–		6	–	1	–	1
Davidson		–		4	–	1	–	1
Florida		–		4	–	1	–	1
Navy		–		9	–	2	–	1
VPI		–		7	–	2	–	0
Virginia		–		6	–	3	–	1
TCU		–		4	–	2	–	2
West Virginia		–		6	–	4	–	0
VMI		–		5	–	3	–	0
Tulane		–		3	–	2	–	0
Oklahoma		–		4	–	4	–	0
North Carolina		–		4	–	4	–	1
Baylor		–		4	–	3	–	1
Arkansas		–		4	–	4	–	1
Maryland		–		3	–	5	–	0
George Washington		–		2	–	4	–	1
The Citadel		–		2	–	4	–	1
Georgetown		–		2	–	4	–	1
Oklahoma A&M		–		1	–	5	–	2
Birmingham		–		1	–	3	–	0
Chattanooga		–		0	–	5	–	1
Delaware		–		0	–	5	–	1
Catholic University		–		0	–	1	–	0
Louisiana Normal		–		0	–	1	–	0
South Carolina State		–		0	–	1	–	0
Spring Hill		–		0	–	1	–	0

The 1907 Spring Hill Badgers football team represented the Spring Hill College as an independent during the 1907 college football season. The team was led by its first head coach, E. G. Maxon. Captain Walsh was injured in the game.

== Schedule ==
Date	Opponent	Site	Result	Source
November 9	Marion	Mobile, AL	L 5–16	
