= 1907 Oklahoma A&M Aggies football team =

American college football season

1907 Oklahoma A&M Aggies football
- Conference: Independent
- Record: 1–5–2
- Head coach: Boyd Hill (2nd season)

1907 Southern college football independents records
	Conf.			Overall
Team	W	L	T	W		L		T
South Carolina		–		3	–	0	–	0
Stetson		–		2	–	0	–	0
Southwestern Louisiana Industrial		–		1	–	0	–	0
Mississippi College		–		1	–	0	–	0
North Carolina A&M		–		6	–	0	–	1
Louisiana Industrial		–		9	–	1	–	0
Kentucky State		–		9	–	1	–	1
Texas		–		6	–	1	–	1
Texas A&M		–		6	–	1	–	1
Davidson		–		4	–	1	–	1
Florida		–		4	–	1	–	1
Navy		–		9	–	2	–	1
VPI		–		7	–	2	–	0
Virginia		–		6	–	3	–	1
TCU		–		4	–	2	–	2
West Virginia		–		6	–	4	–	0
VMI		–		5	–	3	–	0
Tulane		–		3	–	2	–	0
Oklahoma		–		4	–	4	–	0
North Carolina		–		4	–	4	–	1
Baylor		–		4	–	3	–	1
Arkansas		–		4	–	4	–	1
Maryland		–		3	–	5	–	0
George Washington		–		2	–	4	–	1
The Citadel		–		2	–	4	–	1
Georgetown		–		2	–	4	–	1
Oklahoma A&M		–		1	–	5	–	2
Birmingham		–		1	–	3	–	0
Chattanooga		–		0	–	5	–	1
Delaware		–		0	–	5	–	1
Catholic University		–		0	–	1	–	0
Louisiana Normal		–		0	–	1	–	0
South Carolina State		–		0	–	1	–	0
Spring Hill		–		0	–	1	–	0

The 1907 Oklahoma A&M Aggies football team represented Oklahoma A&M College in the 1907 college football season. This was the seventh year of football at A&M and the second under Boyd Hill. The Aggies played their home games in Stillwater, Oklahoma Territory (Stillwater, OK as of November 16). They finished the season 1–5–2.

== Schedule ==
Date	Opponent	Site	Result	Attendance	Source
September 30	Tonkawa Prep	Stillwater, Oklahoma Territory	W 10–0		
October 7	at Southwestern (KS)	Winfield, KS	L 2–6		
October 14	vs. Northwestern Oklahoma State	Enid, Oklahoma Territory	L 0–8		
October 25	Central State Normal	Stillwater, Oklahoma Territory	T 0–0	400	
November 2	at Kingfisher	Kingfisher, Oklahoma Territory	cancelled		
November 9	at Oklahoma	Boyd Field; Norman, Oklahoma Territory (Bedlam)	L 0–67		
November 16	at Epworth	Oklahoma City, OK	L 5–16		
November 22	Kingfisher	Stillwater, OK	L 0–6	300	
November 28	at Central State Normal	Edmond, OK	T 5–5		
