= 1907 TCU football team =

American college football season

1907 TCU football
- Conference: Independent
- Record: 4–2–2
- Head coach: Emory J. Hyde (3rd season)

1907 Southern college football independents records
	Conf.			Overall
Team	W	L	T	W		L		T
South Carolina		–		3	–	0	–	0
Stetson		–		2	–	0	–	0
Southwestern Louisiana Industrial		–		1	–	0	–	0
Mississippi College		–		1	–	0	–	0
North Carolina A&M		–		6	–	0	–	1
Louisiana Industrial		–		9	–	1	–	0
Kentucky State		–		9	–	1	–	1
Texas		–		6	–	1	–	1
Texas A&M		–		6	–	1	–	1
Davidson		–		4	–	1	–	1
Florida		–		4	–	1	–	1
Navy		–		9	–	2	–	1
VPI		–		7	–	2	–	0
Virginia		–		6	–	3	–	1
TCU		–		4	–	2	–	2
West Virginia		–		6	–	4	–	0
VMI		–		5	–	3	–	0
Tulane		–		3	–	2	–	0
Oklahoma		–		4	–	4	–	0
North Carolina		–		4	–	4	–	1
Baylor		–		4	–	3	–	1
Arkansas		–		4	–	4	–	1
Maryland		–		3	–	5	–	0
George Washington		–		2	–	4	–	1
The Citadel		–		2	–	4	–	1
Georgetown		–		2	–	4	–	1
Oklahoma A&M		–		1	–	5	–	2
Birmingham		–		1	–	3	–	0
Chattanooga		–		0	–	5	–	1
Delaware		–		0	–	5	–	1
Catholic University		–		0	–	1	–	0
Louisiana Normal		–		0	–	1	–	0
South Carolina State		–		0	–	1	–	0
Spring Hill		–		0	–	1	–	0

The 1907 TCU football team represented Texas Christian University (TCU) as an independent during the 1907 college football season. Led by Emory J. Hyde in his third and final year as head coach, TCU compiled a record of 4–2–2.

== Schedule ==
Date	Time	Opponent	Site	Result	Source
September 28		Fort Worth	Waco, TX	T 0–0	
October 5		at Baylor	Carroll Field; Waco, TX (rivalry)	T 6–6	
October 12		at Austin	Sherman, TX	W 27–0	
October 19		at Trinity (TX)	Waxahachie, TX	W 27–0	
October 26		at Baylor	Carroll Field; Waco, TX	W 11–10	
November 9	4:00 p.m.	at Texas A&M	College Station, TX (rivalry)	L 5–32	
November 22		at Trinity (TX)	Waxahachie, TX	W 6–5	
November 28		at Baylor	Carroll Field; Waco, TX	L 8–16	
