= 1907 The Citadel Bulldogs football team =

American college football season

1907 The Citadel Bulldogs football
- Conference: Independent
- Record: 2–4–1
- Head coach: Ralph Foster (2nd season)
- Captain: Ed Smith

1907 Southern college football independents records
| | Conf. | | | Overall |
| Team | W | L | T | W | | L | | T |
|---|---|---|---|---|---|---|---|---|
| South Carolina | | – | | 3 | – | 0 | – | 0 |
| Stetson | | – | | 2 | – | 0 | – | 0 |
| Southwestern Louisiana Industrial | | – | | 1 | – | 0 | – | 0 |
| Mississippi College | | – | | 1 | – | 0 | – | 0 |
| North Carolina A&M | | – | | 6 | – | 0 | – | 1 |
| Louisiana Industrial | | – | | 9 | – | 1 | – | 0 |
| Kentucky State | | – | | 9 | – | 1 | – | 1 |
| Texas | | – | | 6 | – | 1 | – | 1 |
| Texas A&M | | – | | 6 | – | 1 | – | 1 |
| Davidson | | – | | 4 | – | 1 | – | 1 |
| Florida | | – | | 4 | – | 1 | – | 1 |
| Navy | | – | | 9 | – | 2 | – | 1 |
| VPI | | – | | 7 | – | 2 | – | 0 |
| Virginia | | – | | 6 | – | 3 | – | 1 |
| TCU | | – | | 4 | – | 2 | – | 2 |
| West Virginia | | – | | 6 | – | 4 | – | 0 |
| VMI | | – | | 5 | – | 3 | – | 0 |
| Tulane | | – | | 3 | – | 2 | – | 0 |
| Oklahoma | | – | | 4 | – | 4 | – | 0 |
| North Carolina | | – | | 4 | – | 4 | – | 1 |
| Baylor | | – | | 4 | – | 3 | – | 1 |
| Arkansas | | – | | 4 | – | 4 | – | 1 |
| Maryland | | – | | 3 | – | 5 | – | 0 |
| George Washington | | – | | 2 | – | 4 | – | 1 |
| The Citadel | | – | | 2 | – | 4 | – | 1 |
| Georgetown | | – | | 2 | – | 4 | – | 1 |
| Oklahoma A&M | | – | | 1 | – | 5 | – | 2 |
| Birmingham | | – | | 1 | – | 3 | – | 0 |
| Chattanooga | | – | | 0 | – | 5 | – | 1 |
| Delaware | | – | | 0 | – | 5 | – | 1 |
| Catholic University | | – | | 0 | – | 1 | – | 0 |
| Louisiana Normal | | – | | 0 | – | 1 | – | 0 |
| South Carolina State | | – | | 0 | – | 1 | – | 0 |
| Spring Hill | | – | | 0 | – | 1 | – | 0 |

The 1907 The Citadel Bulldogs football team represented The Citadel as an independent during the 1907 college football season. This was the third year of intercollegiate football at The Citadel, with Ralph Foster serving as coach for the second season. The Board of Visitors would not permit the cadets to travel outside the city of Charleston for games, and all games are believed to have been played at Hampton Park at the site of the old race course.

== Schedule ==
| Date | Opponent | Site | Result | Source |
|---|---|---|---|---|
| October 12 | Porter Military Academy | Charleston, SC | W 17–2 | |
| October 26 | Medical College of South Carolina | Charleston, SC | L 0–6 | |
| November 2 | Porter Military Academy | Charleston, SC | T 5–5 | |
| November 9 | College of Charleston | Charleston, SC | L 4–5 | |
| November 19 | Welsh Neck High School | Charleston, SC | W 16–0 | |
| November 23 | College of Charleston | Charleston, SC | L 5–7 | |
| November 28 | South Carolina | Charleston, SC | L 0–12 | |
