= 1907 North Carolina A&M Aggies football team =

American college football season

1907 North Carolina A&M Aggies football

South Atlantic champion
- Conference: Independent
- Record: 6–0–1
- Head coach: Mickey Whitehurst (1st season)
- Home stadium: New Athletic Park

1907 Southern college football independents records
	Conf.			Overall
Team	W	L	T	W		L		T
South Carolina		–		3	–	0	–	0
Stetson		–		2	–	0	–	0
Southwestern Louisiana Industrial		–		1	–	0	–	0
Mississippi College		–		1	–	0	–	0
North Carolina A&M		–		6	–	0	–	1
Louisiana Industrial		–		9	–	1	–	0
Kentucky State		–		9	–	1	–	1
Texas		–		6	–	1	–	1
Texas A&M		–		6	–	1	–	1
Davidson		–		4	–	1	–	1
Florida		–		4	–	1	–	1
Navy		–		9	–	2	–	1
VPI		–		7	–	2	–	0
Virginia		–		6	–	3	–	1
TCU		–		4	–	2	–	2
West Virginia		–		6	–	4	–	0
VMI		–		5	–	3	–	0
Tulane		–		3	–	2	–	0
Oklahoma		–		4	–	4	–	0
North Carolina		–		4	–	4	–	1
Baylor		–		4	–	3	–	1
Arkansas		–		4	–	4	–	1
Maryland		–		3	–	5	–	0
George Washington		–		2	–	4	–	1
The Citadel		–		2	–	4	–	1
Georgetown		–		2	–	4	–	1
Oklahoma A&M		–		1	–	5	–	2
Birmingham		–		1	–	3	–	0
Chattanooga		–		0	–	5	–	1
Delaware		–		0	–	5	–	1
Catholic University		–		0	–	1	–	0
Louisiana Normal		–		0	–	1	–	0
South Carolina State		–		0	–	1	–	0
Spring Hill		–		0	–	1	–	0

The 1907 North Carolina A&M Aggies football team represented the North Carolina A&M Aggies of North Carolina College of Agriculture and Mechanic Arts (now known as North Carolina State University) during the 1907 college football season. Led by first year head coach Mickey Whitehurst, the Aggies compiled a 6–0–1 record and claimed a Southern championship for the South Atlantic teams. This is the first year the team played at Riddick Stadium, then known as New Athletic Park.

== Schedule ==
Date	Time	Opponent	Site	Result	Attendance	Source
September 30	3:45 p.m.	Randolph–Macon	New Athletic Park; Raleigh, NC	W 20–0		
October 12	4:00 p.m.	at Richmond	Broad Street Park; Richmond, VA	W 7–4		
October 18	4:15 p.m.	Roanoke	New Athletic Park; Raleigh, NC	W 22–0	600	
October 28	3:30 p.m.	Richmond	New Athletic Park; Raleigh, NC	W 11–0		
November 16		Davidson	Latta Park; Charlotte, NC	W 6–0	2,000	
November 20	3:30 p.m.	N. C. All-Stars	New Athletic Park; Raleigh, NC	T 5–5		
November 28	2:30 p.m.	vs. Virginia	Lafayette Field; Norfolk, VA	W 10–4	12,000	
