= Robert S. Graham =

Robert S. Graham may refer to:

- Robert Graham (Arizona politician) (born 1972), American business owner and chairman of the Arizona Republican Party, 2013–17
- Robert S. Graham (American football) (1881–1967), American football player and coach
