= Lester Larson =

American football player and coach

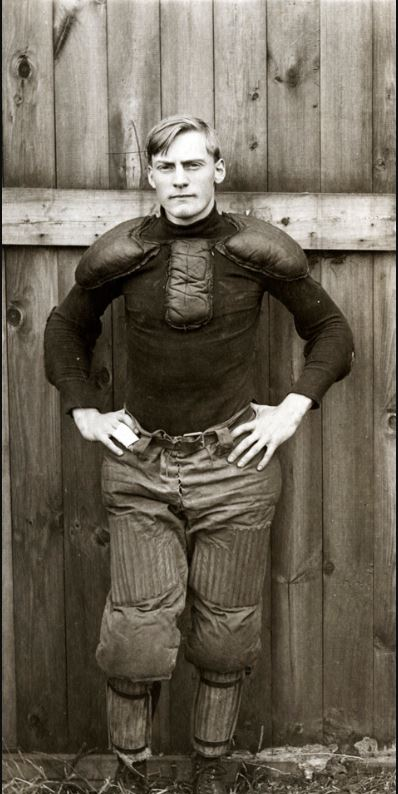

Playing career
- 1905: Chicago
- Position: End

Coaching career (HC unless noted)
- 1907: Texas A&M
- 1912–1913: Louisville

Head coaching record
- Overall: 14–3–1

Accomplishments and honors

Championships
- National (1905)

Lester Lamont Larson was an American college football player and coach. He was the first head football coach in the history of the University of Louisville, serving in that position from 1912 to 1913. At the time of his hiring, he was working as a typewriter salesman. His first team at Louisville in 1912 finished with a record of 3 wins and 1 loss. His second team in 1913 finished with a record of 5 wins and 1 loss, including a 100–0 win over Washington College of Tennessee.

Prior to that, Larson served as the head coach for one season at Texas A&M University, leading the Aggies to a 6–1–1 record.

Larson attended the University of Chicago and a member of the 1905 Chicago Maroons football team that won a national championship under Amos Alonzo Stagg. He won a varsity letter that season. He attended at West Aurora High School in Aurora, Illinois.

== Head coaching record ==
Year	Team	Overall	Conference	Standing	Bowl/playoffs
Texas A&M Aggies (Independent) (1907)
1907	Texas A&M	6–1–1			
Texas A&M:		6–1–1			
Louisville Cardinals (Independent) (1912–1913)
1912	Louisville	3–1			
1913	Louisville	5–1			
Louisville:		8–2			
Total:		14–3–1			
