= 1907 William & Mary Orange and White football team =

American college football season

1907 William & Mary Orange and White football
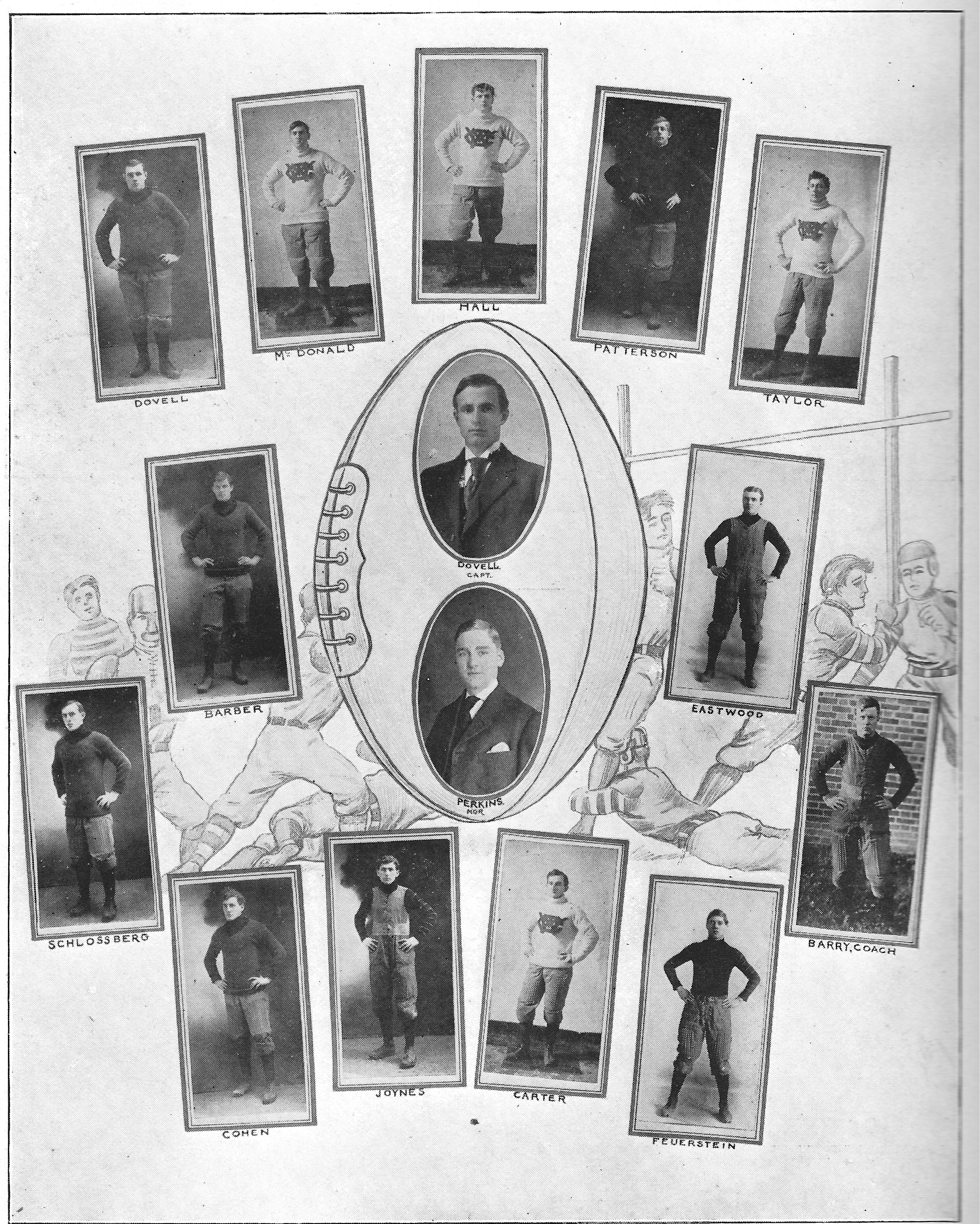
- From the 1908 Colonial Echo

EVIAA co-champion
- Conference: Eastern Virginia Intercollegiate Athletic Association
- Record: 6–3 (2–1 EVIAA)
- Head coach: James E. Barry (1st season)
- Captain: G. A. Dovell

1907 Eastern Virginia Intercollegiate Athletic Association football standings
	Conf.					Overall
Team	W		L		T	W		L		T
William & Mary +	2	–	1	–	0	6	–	3	–	0
Richmond +	2	–	1	–	0	3	–	6	–	0
Randolph–Macon	1	–	2	–	0	4	–	4	–	0
Hampden–Sydney	1	–	2	–	0	3	–	4	–	0
+ – Conference co-champions

The 1907 William & Mary Orange and White football team represented the College of William & Mary as a member of the Eastern Virginia Intercollegiate Athletic Association (EVIAA) during the 1907 college football season. Led by James E. Barry in his first and only season as head coach, the Orange and White compiled an overall record of 6–3.

== Schedule ==
Date	Opponent	Site	Result	Attendance	Source
October 5	at VMI*	VMI Parade Ground; Lexington, VA (rivalry)	L 0–58		
October 12	vs. Randolph–Macon*	Lafayette Field; Norfolk, VA	W 4–0		
October 19	at North Carolina*	Chapel Hill, NC	L 0–14		
October 26	Old Point Comfort College*	Williamsburg, VA	W 16–6		
November 2	vs. Medical College of Virginia*	Riverside Club Athletic Grounds; Petersburg, VA	W 18–0		
November 9	Fort Monroe Artillery School*	Williamsburg, VA	W 15–0		
November 16	vs. Randolph–Macon	Broad Street Park; Richmond, VA	W 12–4		
November 23	at Hampden–Sydney	Hampden Sydney, VA	W 4–0		
November 28	vs. Richmond	Casino Park; Newport News, VA (rivalry)	L 0–48	3,000	
*Non-conference game
