= E. Pratt King =

American football player and coach

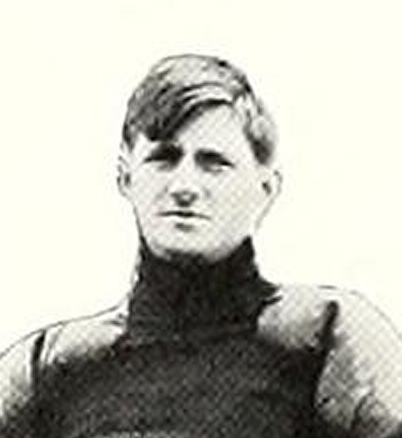
- King pictured in Debris 1905, Purdue yearbook

Profile
- Positions: Head Coach, Guard

Career information
- High school: Mercersburg Academy
- College: Chicago, Purdue

Career history

Playing
- 1906: Massillon Tigers

Coaching
- 1907: Delaware

Awards and highlights
- Ohio League champion (1906)

Ernest Pratt King was an American college football head coach who was Delaware football program's sixth head coach. He led them to an 0–5–1 overall record in 1907—his only season.

== College playing career ==
King played four years at Mercersburg Academy. He then attended the University of Chicago, where he played for one season. He then spent the next three years playing at Purdue University.

== Professional playing career ==
King was also a professional American football player with the Massillon Tigers. He was signed by the Tigers in 1906 to play in the Ohio League championship against the Canton Bulldogs in a two-game series. Massillon would go on to lose the first game of the series, 10–5, but won the second game (and the championship) by a score of 13–6 and clinched the 1906 league championship. However rumors of a gamblers fixing the game tainted the championship.

== Head coaching record ==
Year	Team	Overall	Conference	Standing	Bowl/playoffs
Delaware (Independent) (1907)
1907	Delaware	0–5–1			
Delaware:		0–5–1			
Total:		0–5–1			
