= 1907 VMI Keydets football team =

American college football season

1907 VMI Keydets football
- Conference: Independent
- Record: 5–3
- Head coach: Charles Roller (1st season)

1907 Southern college football independents records
	Conf.			Overall
Team	W	L	T	W		L		T
South Carolina		–		3	–	0	–	0
Stetson		–		2	–	0	–	0
Southwestern Louisiana Industrial		–		1	–	0	–	0
Mississippi College		–		1	–	0	–	0
North Carolina A&M		–		6	–	0	–	1
Louisiana Industrial		–		9	–	1	–	0
Kentucky State		–		9	–	1	–	1
Texas		–		6	–	1	–	1
Texas A&M		–		6	–	1	–	1
Davidson		–		4	–	1	–	1
Florida		–		4	–	1	–	1
Navy		–		9	–	2	–	1
VPI		–		7	–	2	–	0
Virginia		–		6	–	3	–	1
TCU		–		4	–	2	–	2
West Virginia		–		6	–	4	–	0
VMI		–		5	–	3	–	0
Tulane		–		3	–	2	–	0
Oklahoma		–		4	–	4	–	0
North Carolina		–		4	–	4	–	1
Baylor		–		4	–	3	–	1
Arkansas		–		4	–	4	–	1
Maryland		–		3	–	5	–	0
George Washington		–		2	–	4	–	1
The Citadel		–		2	–	4	–	1
Georgetown		–		2	–	4	–	1
Oklahoma A&M		–		1	–	5	–	2
Birmingham		–		1	–	3	–	0
Chattanooga		–		0	–	5	–	1
Delaware		–		0	–	5	–	1
Catholic University		–		0	–	1	–	0
Louisiana Normal		–		0	–	1	–	0
South Carolina State		–		0	–	1	–	0
Spring Hill		–		0	–	1	–	0

The 1907 VMI Keydets football team represented the Virginia Military Institute (VMI) in their 17th season of organized football. Coached by Charles Roller (VMI class of 1901), the Keydets went 5–3.

== Schedule ==
Date	Time	Opponent	Site	Result	Attendance	Source
October 5		William & Mary	Unknown; Lexington, VA (rivalry)	W 58–0		
October 12		St. Stephen's	Unknown; Lexington, VA	W 37–0		
October 19		at Virginia	Madison Hall Field; Charlottesville, VA	L 17–18		
November 2		Roanoke	Unknown; Lexington, VA	W 44–0		
November 9	3:00pm	vs. VPI	Unknown; Roanoke, VA (rivalry)	L 0–22	2,500–3,000	
November 16		Baltimore Medical	Unknown; Lexington, VA	W 68–0		
November 23		Eastern College	Unknown; Lexington, VA	W 54–0		
November 28		vs. Davidson	Roanoke Fair Grounds; Roanoke, VA	L 6–10		

== Roster ==
Name	Weight (lb.)	Height	Age
Biedler	174	5 ft. 11 in.	19
Fray	166	5 ft. 10 in.	20
Wickham	12	5 ft. 11 in.	19
Doyle	144	5 ft. 6 in.	19
Pattison	178	6 ft. 0 in.	19
Orman	249	5 ft. 9 in.	19
Minton	158	5 ft. 11 in.	19
Dunbar	235	5 ft. 11 in.	21
Porter	138	5 ft. 8 in.	19
Hancock	180	5 ft. 9 in.	21
Alexander	153	5 ft. 9 in.	18
Mosely	145	5 ft. 8 in.	17
Tom Poague	140	5 ft. 6 in.	20
Ward	148	5 ft. 7 in.	21
Nelson	171	5 ft. 11 in.	19
Smith	169	5 ft. 11 in.	18
Massie	153	5 ft. 9 in.	20
Clemmer	156	5 ft. 10 in.	18
McMillan	132	5 ft. 3 in.	19
Deshiell	160	5 ft. 7 in.	18
Maclean	170	5 ft. 11 in.	19
H. Poague	156	5 ft. 11 in.	18
