= 1907 Louisiana Industrial football team =

American college football season

1907 Louisiana Industrial football
- Conference: Independent
- Record: 9–1
- Head coach: George L. Watkins (1st season)
- Captain: Dave Caldwell

1907 Southern college football independents records
	Conf.			Overall
Team	W	L	T	W		L		T
South Carolina		–		3	–	0	–	0
Stetson		–		2	–	0	–	0
Southwestern Louisiana Industrial		–		1	–	0	–	0
Mississippi College		–		1	–	0	–	0
North Carolina A&M		–		6	–	0	–	1
Louisiana Industrial		–		9	–	1	–	0
Kentucky State		–		9	–	1	–	1
Texas		–		6	–	1	–	1
Texas A&M		–		6	–	1	–	1
Davidson		–		4	–	1	–	1
Florida		–		4	–	1	–	1
Navy		–		9	–	2	–	1
VPI		–		7	–	2	–	0
Virginia		–		6	–	3	–	1
TCU		–		4	–	2	–	2
West Virginia		–		6	–	4	–	0
VMI		–		5	–	3	–	0
Tulane		–		3	–	2	–	0
Oklahoma		–		4	–	4	–	0
North Carolina		–		4	–	4	–	1
Baylor		–		4	–	3	–	1
Arkansas		–		4	–	4	–	1
Maryland		–		3	–	5	–	0
George Washington		–		2	–	4	–	1
The Citadel		–		2	–	4	–	1
Georgetown		–		2	–	4	–	1
Oklahoma A&M		–		1	–	5	–	2
Birmingham		–		1	–	3	–	0
Chattanooga		–		0	–	5	–	1
Delaware		–		0	–	5	–	1
Catholic University		–		0	–	1	–	0
Louisiana Normal		–		0	–	1	–	0
South Carolina State		–		0	–	1	–	0
Spring Hill		–		0	–	1	–	0

The 1907 Louisiana Industrial football team was an American football team that represented the Louisiana Industrial Institute—now known as Louisiana Tech University—as an independent during the 1907 college football season. In their first and only season under head coach George L. Watkins, Louisiana Industrial compiled a record of 9–1. The team's captain was Dave Caldwell.

== Schedule ==
Date	Opponent	Site	Result	Source
	Monroe Athletic Club	Ruston, LA	W 11–0	
	Monroe Athletic Club	Ruston, LA	W 11–0	
October 11	at LSU	State Field; Baton Rouge, LA	L 0–28	
October 18	Ouachita Baptist	Athletic Field; Ruston, LA	W 30–0	
October 25	at Louisiana Normal	Parish Fair; Natchitoches, LA (rivalry)	W 43–4	
November 5	Henderson	Ruston, LA	W 21–0	
	Ruston Athletic Club	Ruston, LA	W 49–0	
November 16	Jefferson Military College	Ruston, LA	W 35–5	
	Arkansas College	Ruston, LA	W 23–0	
	Mississippi College	Ruston, LA	W 18–0	
