= 1907 Richmond Spiders football team =

American college football season

1907 Richmond Spiders football

EVIAA co-champion
- Conference: Eastern Virginia Intercollegiate Athletic Association
- Record: 3–6 (2–1 EVIAA)
- Head coach: E. A. Dunlap (3rd season)
- Captain: Oscar R. Thraves
- Home stadium: Broad Street Park

1907 Eastern Virginia Intercollegiate Athletic Association football standings
	Conf.					Overall
Team	W		L		T	W		L		T
William & Mary +	2	–	1	–	0	6	–	3	–	0
Richmond +	2	–	1	–	0	3	–	6	–	0
Randolph–Macon	1	–	2	–	0	4	–	4	–	0
Hampden–Sydney	1	–	2	–	0	3	–	4	–	0
+ – Conference co-champions

The 1907 Richmond Spiders football team was an American football team that represented Richmond College—now known as the University of Richmond—as a member of the Eastern Virginia Intercollegiate Athletic Association (EVIAA) during the 1907 college football season. Led by fourth-year head coach E. A. Dunlap, Richmond compiled a record of 3–6.

== Schedule ==
Date	Time	Opponent	Site	Result	Attendance	Source
October 2	3:00 p.m.	at Virginia*	Madison Hall Field; Charlottesville, VA	L 0–38		
October 5	3:30 p.m.	Maryland*	Broad Street Park; Richmond, VA	W 11–5	850	
October 12	4:00 p.m.	North Carolina A&M*	Broad Street Park; Richmond, VA	L 4–7		
October 19	4:00 p.m.	Randolph–Macon*	Broad Street Park; Richmond, VA	L 11–12		
October 28	3:30 p.m.	at North Carolina A&M*	New Athletic Field; Raleigh, NC	L 0–11		
November 9	3:00 p.m.	Hampden–Sydney	Broad Street Park; Richmond, VA	W 38–0		
November 16		at North Carolina*	Chapel Hill, NC	L 11–13		
November 28		vs. William & Mary	Casino Park; Newport News, VA (rivalry)	W 48–0	3,000	
November 30	3:00 p.m.	Randolph–Macon	Broad Street Park; Richmond, VA	L 10–14	1,500	
*Non-conference game
