= Robert S. Graham (American football) =

American football player and coach (1881–1967)

Biographical details
- Born: January 9, 1881; Tazewell County, Virginia, U.S.
- Died: July 6, 1967 (aged 86)
- Education: Hampden–Sydney (BA, 1902); Virginia (LLB, 1906)

Playing career
- 1904–1906: Virginia

Coaching career (HC unless noted)
- 1906–1907: Davidson

Head coaching record
- Overall: 7–3–3

Robert Spotts Graham (January 9, 1881 – July 6, 1967) was an American college football player and coach. He served as the head football coach at Davidson College in Davidson, North Carolina for at least one season in 1907 and likely part of the previous season in 1906.

Grahamwas a 1902 graduate of Hampden–Sydney College and earned a law degree from the University of Virginia in 1906. The 1915 National Collegiate Athletic Association (NCAA) football guide listed him as a resident of Norton, Virginia and a registered referee.

== Head coaching record ==
Year	Team	Overall	Conference	Standing	Bowl/playoffs
Davidson (Independent) (1906–1907)
1906	Davidson	3–2–2			
1907	Davidson	4–1–1			
Davidson:		7–3–3			
Total:		7–3–3			
