= Tom Warlick =

American football player and coach (1888–1939)

Biographical details
- Born: 1888
- Died: February 28, 1939 (aged 50–51); Statesville, North Carolina, U.S.

Playing career
- 1905–1906: Davidson

Coaching career (HC unless noted)
- 1907–1908: Lenoir
- 1909–1911: Catawba
- 1922: Catawba

Thomas McCorkle Warlick (1888 – February 28, 1939) was an American college football player and coach. He served as the head football coach at Lenoir College—now known as Lenoir–Rhyne University—from 1907 to 1908 and Catawba College from 1909 to 1911 and again in 1922.
