= Gaston Park =

Baseball park in Dallas, Texas, US

Coordinates: 32.7805°N 96.7665°W

- Interactive map of Gaston Park
- Full name: Gaston Park
- Location: Dallas, Texas

Construction
- Opened: 1902
- Closed: 1914

Tenants
- Dallas Griffins (Texas League) (1902); Dallas Giants (Texas League) (1903–1914)

Gaston Park was a baseball park located in Dallas, Texas. Named for landowner William H. Gaston, the ballpark existed within the State Fair grounds in the vicinity of Texas and Pacific rail tracks as well as the Music Hall at Fair Park in Dallas. The field was also used for the Red River Rivalry in 1912 and 1914. Oklahoma beat Texas 21–6 in 1912 while the Longhorns beat the Sooners 32–7 in 1914. The A&M College of Texas, as it was then known, beat Baylor University there on Thanksgiving Day 1912 by score of 53–0.

Early newspaper reports of Texas League baseball games were stated as "at the fair grounds".

== Sources ==
- Holaday, Chris; Presswood, Mark (2004). Baseball in Dallas. Charleston, SC: Arcadia Publishing. ISBN 0-7385-3282-7.
