= 1907 college football season =

American college football season

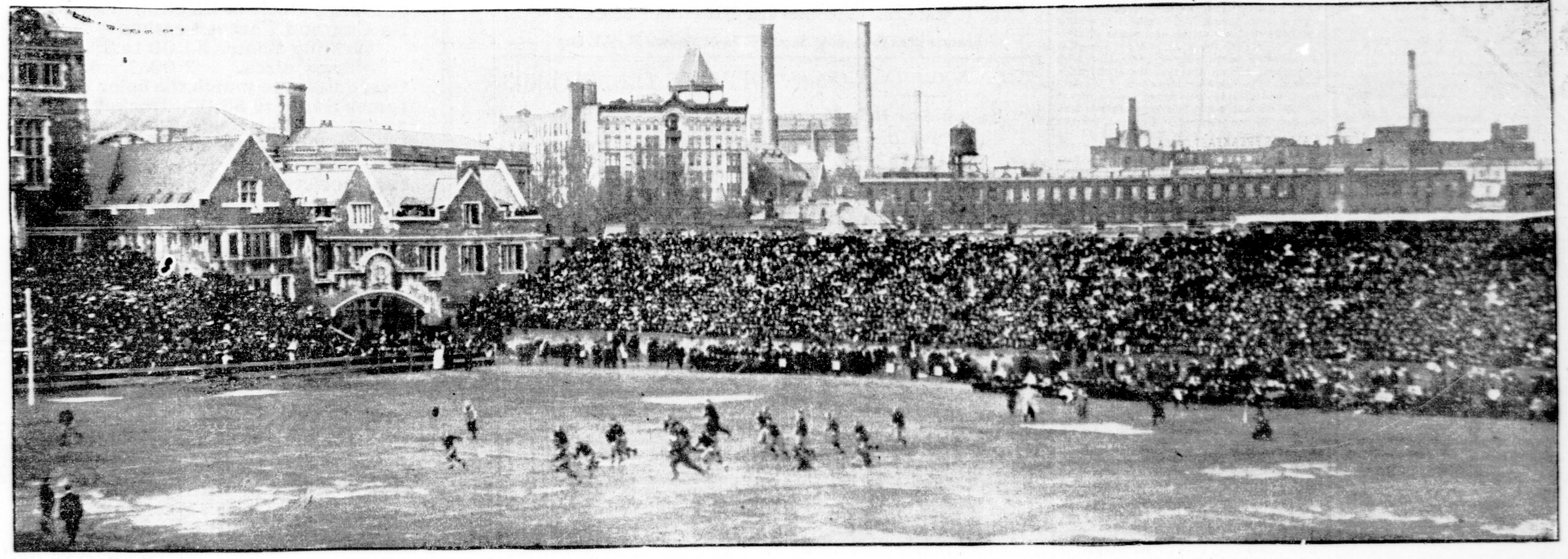
- Part of the crowd watching the Penn Quakers defeat Cornell on Franklin Field, Philadelphia
- Champion: Yale

The 1907 college football season saw the increased use of the forward pass, which had been legalized the year before. Football remained a dangerous game, despite the "debrutalization" reforms, and an unprecedented eleven players were killed (9 high school and 2 college), while 98 others were seriously injured. However, there were no serious injuries reported among the major colleges. The Yale Bulldogs, unbeaten with a record of 9–0–1, had the best record. The Helms Athletic Foundation, founded in 1936, declared retroactively that Yale had been the best college football team of 1907. Yale and Penn both claim 1907 as a national championship season. Although Yale was named as champion by 6 different entities, Penn was not named champion by any. Penn's claim to the championship is only by the university itself.

== Rules ==
The rules for American football in 1907 were significantly different from those a century later, as many of the present rules (100 yard field, four downs to gain ten yards, 6-point touchdown, and 3-point field goal) were adopted in 1912. The rules in 1907 were:

- Field 110 yards in length
- Kickoff made from midfield
- Three downs to gain ten yards
- Touchdown worth 5 points
- Field goal worth 4 points
- Forward pass legal, but subject to penalties:

More passes were thrown than in 1906, when the new play was still experimental. However, because of problems with the rules at that time, which penalized the offense for an incomplete pass, there were predictions that the forward pass would be scrapped. Attempting a pass in 1907 was still a risky business, because an incomplete attempt would result in stiff penalties—15 yards back from the spot from which the pass was thrown on first or second down. If the defense committed a foul, the 15 yard penalty didn't apply to the offense, but the defending team was not penalized either. In addition, a pass could not be caught in the end zone, nor more than 20 yards beyond the line of scrimmage.

== Conference and program changes ==
- The Big Nine Conference, still officially known as the Intercollegiate Conference of Faculty Representatives, voted Michigan out of the conference for failing to adhere to league rules.
- Iowa became a joint member of the Big 9 and the Missouri Valley conferences.

| School | 1906 Conference | 1907 Conference |
|---|---|---|
| University of Iowa Hawkeyes | Western | MVIAA & Western |
| University of Kansas Jayhawks | Independent | MVIAA |
| University of Michigan Wolverines | Big Nine (Western) | Independent |
| University of Missouri Tigers | Independent | MVIAA |
| University of Nebraska Cornhuskers | Independent | MVIAA |
| Washington University in St. Louis Bears | Independent | MVIAA |

== September ==
The Princeton Tigers and Yale Bulldogs had both been unbeaten in 1906, and played to a 0–0 tie at season's end, giving both teams a 9–0–1 record. Among other schools that would later be described as the Ivy League, the Harvard Crimson and Pennsylvania (Penn) Quakers were expected to do well. Elsewhere in the East, the United States Naval Academy Midshipmen(referred to in the press as Annapolis) and the Carlisle Indian School (coached by Glenn Scobey "Pop" Warner and with Jim Thorpe as its star back) were expected to do well. In the South, the Vanderbilt Commodores and the Sewanee Tigers of the Southern Intercollegiate Athletic Association (SIAA) were considered contenders, along with Georgia Tech (coached by John Heisman). The University of Chicago Maroons, members of the Western Conference (later the Big Ten), and coached by Amos Alonzo Stagg), and the (then) independent Michigan Wolverines, coached by Fielding "Hurry Up" Yost, were considered to be among the stronger teams in the Midwest.

Carlisle opened its season early with a 40–0 win over Lebanon Valley on September 21, and Brown beat New Hampshire, 16–0. Colgate, which would later be a contender, lost to Niagara, 11–6, and Bucknell beat Mansfield, 15–2.

On September 28, Pennsylvania beat North Carolina in a driving rain at Philadelphia, 27–0. Carlisle defeated Villanova 10–0. Princeton crushed Stevens Tech 47–0, while Harvard was held to a touchdown (then worth five points) in a 5–0 win over Bowdoin. Brown beat Massachusetts 5–0, and Fordham and Rutgers played to a 5–5 tie.

== October ==
Yale opened its season on Wednesday afternoon, October 2, with a 25–0 win over Wesleyan. The same day, Harvard beat Maine, 30–0, Navy tuned up with a 26–0 win over St. John's College of Maryland, Pennsylvania beat Villanova 16–0 and Carlisle rolled over Susquehanna, 91–0. Three days later, on Saturday October 5, the schools played again, with Yale beating Syracuse 11–0, Harvard over Bates 33–4, Navy handing a 15–0 loss on Dickinson, Pennsylvania beating Bucknell 29–2, and Carlisle beating Penn State 18–5 in Williamsport, Pennsylvania. At West Point, the United States Military Academy (Army) opened its season with a 23–0 win over Franklin & Marshall. Brown won over Norwich 24–0.

After an 18–0 win over Springfield on Wednesday, October 9, Yale won its fourth game in 12 days on October 12, crushing Holy Cross 52–0 to stay unbeaten and unscored upon. Playing the same Wednesday and Saturday schedule, Pennsylvania had beaten Franklin & Marshall 57–0 and Swarthmore 16–8, to go 5–0–0. With a 40–0 win over Maine, Brown University remained unscored upon as well. In Buffalo, New York, Carlisle beat Syracuse 14–6 to stay unbeaten. Cornell beat Colgate 18–0 and Princeton beat Villanova, 45–5. Vanderbilt and Navy played to a 6–6 tie.

October 19, Pennsylvania increased its record to 7–0–0 with an 11–0 win over Brown. In the four weeks since its September 28 opener, Penn had played four Saturdays and three Wednesdays. Carlisle beat Bucknell 15–0 and Harvard beat Navy at Annapolis, 6–0, as both stayed unbeaten. Yale remained unscored upon, but not untied, as it played Army to a 0–0 tie at West Point to "fall" to 4–0–1. Elsewhere, Michigan stayed unscored upon with a 22–0 win in Indianapolis over Wabash. In the South, Sewanee beat Auburn 12–6 in Birmingham, then beat Alabama two days later, 54–4, in Tuscaloosa.

October 26 in Philadelphia, the Carlisle Indians (6–0–0) and the Pennsylvania Quakers (7–0–0) met in a battle of the unbeatens. Carlisle won 26–6 before a crowd of 20,000. Yale registered its sixth shutout with a 45–0 win over Villanova. Harvard stayed unbeaten, but was surprised by a touchdown from the visitors in its 9–5 win over Springfield. Sewanee played Mississippi in Memphis, winning 65–0, to stay unbeaten in the south. Michigan remained unscored upon in the midwest with a 22–0 win at home over Ohio State. Princeton suffered its first defeat, a 6–5 loss at Cornell.

== November ==
In a highly anticipated game, the Carlisle Indians (7–0–0) met the Princeton Tigers (5–1–0) at the Polo Grounds in New York City on November 2 before a crowd of thousands. In an upset, Princeton scored three touchdowns and a point after in a pouring rain, to win 16–0. Yale recorded another shutout, beating Washington & Jefferson 11–0 to increase its record to 6–0–1, while Harvard got past Brown, 6–5, to stay unbeaten at 7–0–0. Army and Michigan stayed unscored upon; Army beat Colgate 6–0, to improve its record to 4–0–1, while the Wolverines travelled south to Nashville to face Vanderbilt, winning 8–0. Sewanee defeated the University of Virginia in Norfolk, 12–0, and Pennsylvania hosted Lafayette in Philadelphia, winning 15–0 and extending its record to 8–1–0.

On November 9, the Harvard Crimson (7–0–0) hosted the Carlisle Indians (7–1–0) before a record crowd of 20,000. After holding a 12–9 lead at halftime, Carlisle broke the game open when its quarterback, Frank Mount Pleasant, ran 85 yards for a touchdown in the second half as Carlisle won, 23–15. Navy suffered its second loss, an 18–0 drubbing by Swarthmore, and Army had its first defeat, falling 14–10 to Cornell. Yale recorded its 8th straight shutout, a 22–0 win over Brown, as Ted Jones returned a punt 90 yards for the first of three touchdowns in the second half. Sewanee beat Georgia Tech in Atlanta, 18–0, then defeated Georgia in Athens two days later, 16–0, to extend its record to 8–0–0. Pennsylvania hosted Penn State and won 28–0 to reach the 9–1–0 mark, while Princeton beat Amherst, 14–0.

November 16 Yale (7–0–1) hosted Princeton (7–1–0) as a crowd of 35,000 watched in New Haven. The Bulldogs appeared to be headed toward their first defeat. Yale yielded its first points of the season after the Tigers blocked a punt and Princeton's Booth returned the ball for a touchdown. A field goal—at that time, worth four points—put Princeton up 10–0 at the half. In the second half, Ted Coy scored two touchdowns for Yale for a 12–10 win. In the day's other big game, Pennsylvania (9–1–0) traveled to Ann Arbor, Michigan, to face the unbeaten (5–0–0), and unscored upon, Michigan Wolverines, before a crowd of 18,000 at Ferry Field. Both teams had touchdowns called back by penalties, but Penn scored on an onside kick to hand Michigan its first ever home defeat, 6–0.

Harvard lost its second straight game, falling to Dartmouth, 22–0. In another "intersectional" game, Carlisle improved its record to 9–1–0 with a 12–10 win at Minnesota. Navy trailed Penn State at home, 4–0, until a State player fumbled a punt and the Midshipmen recovered for a touchdown to win 6–4. At West Point, Army defeated visiting Tufts, 21–0. In the South, Texas A&M — which had tied Texas, and beaten LSU and Oklahoma — improved its record to 6–0–1 with an 18–6 win over Tulane in New Orleans. One year after University Trustees banned football, The University of South Carolina team ended with an undefeated record of 3–0–0.

November 23 marked the close of the season, as unbeaten Yale (8–0–1) traveled to Cambridge to play its annual game against Harvard. Although stung by two consecutive losses, Harvard (7–2–0) had been unbeaten and untied three weeks earlier. Harvard missed two field goal attempts in the first half after failing to get by Yale's goal line defense, while Yale's Ted Coy scored late in the first half to give the Bulldogs a 6–0 lead. Coy scored again in the second half, and Yale won 12–0 and completed its season unbeaten at 9–0–1. Sewanee, which took a record of 8–0–0 into its final game (against 4–1–1 Vanderbilt), lost in Nashville, 17–12. The other unbeaten team, Texas A & M (6–0–1), was scheduled to play a Thanksgiving Day game at the University of Texas (5–1–1). Carlisle closed its season at the University of Chicago, which had won the title of the Western Conference (later the Big Ten, with a 4–0–0 record. Playing before a crowd of 27,000 the Indians beat the Maroons 18–4.

The catch by Vanderbilt center Stein Stone, on a double pass play then thrown near the end zone by Bob Blake to set up the Honus Craig touchdown that beat Sewanee at the very end, for the SIAA championship was cited by Grantland Rice as the greatest thrill he ever witnessed in his years of watching sports. McGugin in Spalding's Football Guide's summation of the season in the SIAA wrote "The standing. First, Vanderbilt; second, Sewanee, a might good second;" and that Aubrey Lanier "came near winning the Vanderbilt game by his brilliant dashes after receiving punts."

Thanksgiving Day, November 28, saw St. Louis University stun the University of Nebraska 34–0 before 20,000 at Sportsman's Park.

== Conference standings ==
=== Conference standings ===
1907 Colorado Football Association standings
| | Conf. | | | | | Overall |
| Team | W | | L | | T | W | | L | | T |
|---|---|---|---|---|---|---|---|---|---|---|
| Colorado Mines $ | 4 | – | 0 | – | 0 | 5 | – | 1 | – | 0 |
| Colorado College | 3 | – | 1 | – | 0 | 5 | – | 2 | – | 0 |
| Colorado | 2 | – | 2 | – | 0 | 5 | – | 3 | – | 0 |
| Denver | 1 | – | 3 | – | 0 | 2 | – | 6 | – | 0 |
| Colorado Agricultural | 0 | – | 4 | – | 0 | 0 | – | 4 | – | 0 |
$ – Conference champion

1907 Ohio Athletic Conference football standings
| | Conf. | | | | | Overall |
| Team | W | | L | | T | W | | L | | T |
|---|---|---|---|---|---|---|---|---|---|---|
| Western Reserve $ | 5 | – | 1 | – | 0 | 8 | – | 1 | – | 0 |
| Ohio State | 5 | – | 1 | – | 1 | 7 | – | 2 | – | 1 |
| Oberlin | 3 | – | 1 | – | 0 | 6 | – | 2 | – | 0 |
| Case | 5 | – | 2 | – | 0 | 6 | – | 3 | – | 0 |
| Kenyon | 3 | – | 4 | – | 0 | 4 | – | 4 | – | 0 |
| Ohio Wesleyan | 2 | – | 3 | – | 0 | 7 | – | 3 | – | 0 |
| Wooster | 1 | – | 4 | – | 1 | 2 | – | 4 | – | 1 |
| Denison | 1 | – | 5 | – | 0 | 3 | – | 5 | – | 0 |
| Heidelberg | 0 | – | 4 | – | 0 | 2 | – | 4 | – | 0 |
$ – Conference champion

1907 Missouri Valley Conference football standings
| | Conf. | | | | | Overall |
| Team | W | | L | | T | W | | L | | T |
|---|---|---|---|---|---|---|---|---|---|---|
| Iowa + | 1 | – | 0 | – | 0 | 3 | – | 2 | – | 0 |
| Nebraska + | 1 | – | 0 | – | 0 | 8 | – | 2 | – | 0 |
| Kansas | 1 | – | 1 | – | 0 | 5 | – | 3 | – | 0 |
| Missouri | 1 | – | 2 | – | 0 | 7 | – | 2 | – | 0 |
| Washington University | 0 | – | 1 | – | 0 | 1 | – | 5 | – | 1 |
+ – Conference co-champions

1907 Southern Intercollegiate Athletic Association football standings
| | Conf. | | | | | Overall |
| Team | W | | L | | T | W | | L | | T |
|---|---|---|---|---|---|---|---|---|---|---|
| Vanderbilt $ | 3 | – | 0 | – | 0 | 5 | – | 1 | – | 1 |
| Sewanee | 6 | – | 1 | – | 0 | 8 | – | 1 | – | 0 |
| LSU | 3 | – | 1 | – | 0 | 7 | – | 3 | – | 0 |
| Alabama | 3 | – | 1 | – | 2 | 5 | – | 1 | – | 2 |
| Tennessee | 3 | – | 2 | – | 0 | 7 | – | 2 | – | 1 |
| Auburn | 3 | – | 2 | – | 1 | 6 | – | 2 | – | 1 |
| Georgia | 3 | – | 3 | – | 1 | 4 | – | 3 | – | 1 |
| Mississippi A&M | 3 | – | 3 | – | 0 | 6 | – | 3 | – | 0 |
| Georgia Tech | 2 | – | 4 | – | 0 | 4 | – | 4 | – | 0 |
| Clemson | 1 | – | 3 | – | 0 | 4 | – | 4 | – | 0 |
| Mercer | 0 | – | 3 | – | 0 | 3 | – | 3 | – | 0 |
| Howard (AL) | 0 | – | 5 | – | 0 | 2 | – | 5 | – | 0 |
| Ole Miss | 0 | – | 5 | – | 0 | 0 | – | 6 | – | 0 |
| Nashville | | | – | | | | | – |
$ – Conference champion

1907 Western Conference football standings
| | Conf. | | | | | Overall |
| Team | W | | L | | T | W | | L | | T |
|---|---|---|---|---|---|---|---|---|---|---|
| Chicago $ | 4 | – | 0 | – | 0 | 4 | – | 1 | – | 0 |
| Wisconsin | 3 | – | 1 | – | 1 | 3 | – | 1 | – | 1 |
| Illinois | 3 | – | 2 | – | 0 | 3 | – | 2 | – | 0 |
| Iowa | 1 | – | 1 | – | 0 | 3 | – | 2 | – | 0 |
| Minnesota | 0 | – | 1 | – | 1 | 2 | – | 2 | – | 1 |
| Indiana | 0 | – | 3 | – | 0 | 2 | – | 3 | – | 1 |
| Purdue | 0 | – | 3 | – | 0 | 0 | – | 5 | – | 0 |
$ – Conference champion

=== Independents ===
1907 Eastern college football independents records
| | Conf. | | | Overall |
| Team | W | L | T | W | | L | | T |
|---|---|---|---|---|---|---|---|---|
| Yale | | – | | 9 | – | 0 | – | 1 |
| Dartmouth | | – | | 8 | – | 0 | – | 1 |
| Penn | | – | | 11 | – | 1 | – | 0 |
| Carlisle | | – | | 10 | – | 1 | – | 0 |
| Temple | | – | | 4 | – | 0 | – | 2 |
| Fordham | | – | | 6 | – | 1 | – | 1 |
| Cornell | | – | | 8 | – | 2 | – | 0 |
| Western U. of Penn. | | – | | 8 | – | 2 | – | 0 |
| Princeton | | – | | 7 | – | 2 | – | 0 |
| Washington & Jefferson | | – | | 7 | – | 2 | – | 0 |
| Lafayette | | – | | 7 | – | 2 | – | 1 |
| Lehigh | | – | | 7 | – | 2 | – | 1 |
| Swarthmore | | – | | 6 | – | 2 | – | 0 |
| Army | | – | | 6 | – | 2 | – | 1 |
| NYU | | – | | 5 | – | 2 | – | 0 |
| Vermont | | – | | 4 | – | 1 | – | 2 |
| Harvard | | – | | 7 | – | 3 | – | 0 |
| Brown | | – | | 7 | – | 3 | – | 0 |
| Penn State | | – | | 6 | – | 4 | – | 0 |
| Syracuse | | – | | 5 | – | 3 | – | 1 |
| Drexel | | – | | 3 | – | 2 | – | 2 |
| Colgate | | – | | 4 | – | 4 | – | 1 |
| Geneva | | – | | 4 | – | 5 | – | 2 |
| Dickinson | | – | | 3 | – | 4 | – | 2 |
| Amherst | | – | | 3 | – | 4 | – | 1 |
| Tufts | | – | | 3 | – | 4 | – | 1 |
| Frankin & Marshall | | – | | 4 | – | 6 | – | 0 |
| Rutgers | | – | | 3 | – | 5 | – | 1 |
| Springfield Training School | | – | | 2 | – | 4 | – | 2 |
| Bucknell | | – | | 4 | – | 7 | – | 0 |
| New Hampshire | | – | | 1 | – | 5 | – | 2 |
| Villanova | | – | | 1 | – | 5 | – | 1 |
| Holy Cross | | – | | 1 | – | 7 | – | 2 |
| Wesleyan | | – | | 1 | – | 7 | – | 1 |
| Carnegie Tech | | – | | 1 | – | 8 | – | 0 |

1907 Midwestern college football independents records
| | Conf. | | | Overall |
| Team | W | L | T | W | | L | | T |
|---|---|---|---|---|---|---|---|---|
| Marquette | | – | | 6 | – | 0 | – | 0 |
| North Dakota Agricultural | | – | | 3 | – | 0 | – | 0 |
| Lincoln (MO) | | – | | 1 | – | 0 | – | 0 |
| Notre Dame | | – | | 6 | – | 0 | – | 1 |
| Miami (OH) | | – | | 6 | – | 1 | – | 0 |
| Michigan | | – | | 5 | – | 1 | – | 0 |
| Mount Union | | – | | 9 | – | 2 | – | 0 |
| Fairmount | | – | | 8 | – | 2 | – | 0 |
| Iowa State | | – | | 6 | – | 2 | – | 0 |
| Lake Forest | | – | | 4 | – | 1 | – | 1 |
| South Dakota State | | – | | 5 | – | 2 | – | 0 |
| St. Vincent's (IL) | | – | | 5 | – | 2 | – | 0 |
| Wabash | | – | | 5 | – | 2 | – | 0 |
| Saint Louis | | – | | 7 | – | 3 | – | 0 |
| Western State Normal | | – | | 4 | – | 2 | – | 1 |
| Kansas State | | – | | 5 | – | 3 | – | 0 |
| Michigan State Normal | | – | | 3 | – | 2 | – | 0 |
| Wittenberg | | – | | 5 | – | 4 | – | 0 |
| Central Michigan | | – | | 3 | – | 3 | – | 0 |
| Drake | | – | | 3 | – | 4 | – | 1 |
| Ohio | | – | | 3 | – | 4 | – | 1 |
| Western Illinois | | – | | 2 | – | 3 | – | 0 |
| Franklin | | – | | 3 | – | 5 | – | 1 |
| Heidelberg | | – | | 2 | – | 4 | – | 1 |
| Butler | | – | | 1 | – | 3 | – | 2 |
| Carthage | | – | | 2 | – | 5 | – | 0 |
| Haskell | | – | | 2 | – | 6 | – | 1 |
| Chicago P&S | | – | | 1 | – | 3 | – | 0 |
| Detroit College | | – | | 1 | – | 3 | – | 0 |
| Northern Illinois State | | – | | 1 | – | 4 | – | 1 |
| Doane | | – | | 1 | – | 5 | – | 0 |
| St. Mary's (OH) | | – | | 0 | – | 4 | – | 0 |
| Baldwin–Wallace | | – | | 0 | – | 6 | – | 0 |

1907 Southern college football independents records
| | Conf. | | | Overall |
| Team | W | L | T | W | | L | | T |
|---|---|---|---|---|---|---|---|---|
| South Carolina | | – | | 3 | – | 0 | – | 0 |
| Stetson | | – | | 2 | – | 0 | – | 0 |
| Southwestern Louisiana Industrial | | – | | 1 | – | 0 | – | 0 |
| Mississippi College | | – | | 1 | – | 0 | – | 0 |
| North Carolina A&M | | – | | 6 | – | 0 | – | 1 |
| Louisiana Industrial | | – | | 9 | – | 1 | – | 0 |
| Kentucky State | | – | | 9 | – | 1 | – | 1 |
| Texas | | – | | 6 | – | 1 | – | 1 |
| Texas A&M | | – | | 6 | – | 1 | – | 1 |
| Davidson | | – | | 4 | – | 1 | – | 1 |
| Florida | | – | | 4 | – | 1 | – | 1 |
| Navy | | – | | 9 | – | 2 | – | 1 |
| VPI | | – | | 7 | – | 2 | – | 0 |
| Virginia | | – | | 6 | – | 3 | – | 1 |
| TCU | | – | | 4 | – | 2 | – | 2 |
| West Virginia | | – | | 6 | – | 4 | – | 0 |
| VMI | | – | | 5 | – | 3 | – | 0 |
| Tulane | | – | | 3 | – | 2 | – | 0 |
| Oklahoma | | – | | 4 | – | 4 | – | 0 |
| North Carolina | | – | | 4 | – | 4 | – | 1 |
| Baylor | | – | | 4 | – | 3 | – | 1 |
| Arkansas | | – | | 4 | – | 4 | – | 1 |
| Maryland | | – | | 3 | – | 5 | – | 0 |
| George Washington | | – | | 2 | – | 4 | – | 1 |
| The Citadel | | – | | 2 | – | 4 | – | 1 |
| Georgetown | | – | | 2 | – | 4 | – | 1 |
| Oklahoma A&M | | – | | 1 | – | 5 | – | 2 |
| Birmingham | | – | | 1 | – | 3 | – | 0 |
| Chattanooga | | – | | 0 | – | 5 | – | 1 |
| Delaware | | – | | 0 | – | 5 | – | 1 |
| Catholic University | | – | | 0 | – | 1 | – | 0 |
| Louisiana Normal | | – | | 0 | – | 1 | – | 0 |
| South Carolina State | | – | | 0 | – | 1 | – | 0 |
| Spring Hill | | – | | 0 | – | 1 | – | 0 |

1907 Western college football independents records
| | Conf. | | | Overall |
| Team | W | L | T | W | | L | | T |
|---|---|---|---|---|---|---|---|---|
| Oregon Agricultural | | – | | 6 | – | 0 | – | 0 |
| New Mexico A&M | | – | | 3 | – | 0 | – | 0 |
| New Mexico | | – | | 1 | – | 0 | – | 0 |
| Washington State | | – | | 7 | – | 1 | – | 0 |
| Colorado Mines | | – | | 5 | – | 1 | – | 0 |
| Oregon | | – | | 5 | – | 1 | – | 0 |
| USC | | – | | 5 | – | 1 | – | 0 |
| Utah Agricultural | | – | | 5 | – | 1 | – | 0 |
| Idaho | | – | | 3 | – | 1 | – | 2 |
| Montana | | – | | 4 | – | 1 | – | 1 |
| Utah | | – | | 4 | – | 2 | – | 0 |
| Wyoming | | – | | 2 | – | 1 | – | 0 |
| Gonzaga | | – | | 0 | – | 0 | – | 1 |
| Washington | | – | | 4 | – | 4 | – | 2 |

=== Minor conferences ===
| Conference | Champion(s) | Record |
|---|---|---|
| Kansas Collegiate Athletic Conference | Washburn | 5–1 |
| Michigan Intercollegiate Athletic Association | Olivet | 5–1 |

== Awards and honors ==
=== All-Americans ===
The consensus All-America team included:

| Position | Name | Height | Weight (lbs.) | Class | Hometown | Team |
|---|---|---|---|---|---|---|
| QB | Tad Jones | | | | | Yale |
| HB | Jack Wendell | | | | | Harvard |
| HB | Edwin Harlan | | | Sr. | Bel Air, Maryland | Princeton |
| FB | Ted Coy | 6'0" | 195 | So. | Andover, Massachusetts | Yale |
| FB | Jim McCormick | | | Sr. | Boston, Massachusetts | Princeton |
| FB | Peter Hauser | | | Sr. | Fort Reno, Oklahoma | Carlisle |
| E | Bill Dague | | | Sr. | Benton, Indiana | Navy |
| E | Albert Exendine | | | Sr. | | Carlisle |
| T | Hamilton Fish | 6'4" | 200 | Jr. | Southboro, Massachusetts | Harvard |
| T | Dexter Draper | | | Sr. | | Penn |
| G | Gus Ziegler | | | Sr. | | Penn |
| C | Germany Schulz | 6'2" | 215 | Sr. | Fort Wayne, Indiana | Michigan |
| C | Patrick Grant | | | | Boston, Massachusetts | Harvard |
| G | William Erwin | | | | | Army |
| T | Lucius Horatio Biglow | | | Sr. | Morristown, New Jersey | Yale |
| E | Clarence Alcott | | | Sr. | | Yale |
| E | Caspar Wister | | | | | Princeton |
