= Louisiana Normal football, 1907–1909 =

American college football seasons

The Louisiana Normal football program from 1907 to 1909 represented Louisiana State Normal School—now known as Northwestern State University—in its first decade of college football competition.

== 1907 ==
1907 Louisiana Normal football
- Conference: Independent
- Record: 0–1
- Head coach: John W. Coolidge (1st season)

The 1907 Louisiana Normal football team represented Louisiana State Normal School—now known as Northwestern State University—during the 1907 college football season. Led by first-year head coach John W. Coolidge, Louisiana Normal played only one game, losing to Louisiana Industrial in a contest played on October 25 at Shreveport, Louisiana. This was the first football team fielded by Louisiana Normal.

=== Schedule ===
Date	Opponent	Site	Result	Source
October 25	vs. Louisiana Industrial	Parish Fair; Shreveport, LA (rivalry)	L 4–43	

== 1908 ==
1908 Louisiana Normal football
- Conference: Independent
- Record: 1–2–1
- Head coach: John W. Coolidge (2nd season)
- Captain: Hanchy

The 1908 Louisiana Normal football team represented Louisiana State Normal School—now known as Northwestern State University—during the 1908 college football season. Led by second-year head coach John W. Coolidge, the team finished with a 1–2–1 record.

=== Schedule ===
Date	Time	Opponent	Site	Result	Source
October 17	3:30 p.m.	Centenary	League Park; Natchitoches, LA	L 0–16	
		Natchitoches Athletic Club		T 0–0	
		Louisiana College		W 7–0	
November 26		Shreveport High School	Natchitoches, LA	L 5–16	

== 1909 ==
1909 Louisiana Normal football
- Conference: Independent
- Record: 4–1
- Head coach: J. H. Griffith (1st season)

The 1909 Louisiana Normal football team represented Louisiana State Normal School—now known as Northwestern State University—during the 1909 college football season. Led by first-year head coach J. H. Griffith, the team finished with a 4–1 record.

Although noted in the official media guide, the 5–0 victory against Winnfield High School at Winnfield, Louisiana on November 26 was played by the subs and not the varsity.

=== Schedule ===
Date	Opponent	Site	Result	Source
October 23	Alexandria Athletic Club	Natchitoches, LA	W 64–0	
November 12	Centenary	Natchitoches, LA	W 17–0	
November 19	at Louisiana Industrial	Athletic Park; Ruston, LA (rivalry)	L 0–45	
November 25	Southwestern Louisiana Industrial	Natchitoches, LA	W 46–0	
December 12	at Southwestern Louisiana Industrial	Lafayette, LA	W 11–0	
