= 1907 Kentucky State College Blue and White football team =

American college football season

1907 Kentucky State College Blue and White football

KIAA champion
- Conference: Kentucky Intercollegiate Athletic Association
- Record: 9–1–1 (4–0 KIAA)
- Head coach: J. White Guyn (2nd season)
- Captain: George Adair

The 1907 Kentucky State College Blue and White football team represented Kentucky State College—now known as the University of Kentucky—during the 1907 college football season. The team was state champion; champion of the Kentucky Intercollegiate Athletic Association.

== Schedule ==
Date	Opponent	Site	Result	Attendance	Source
September 21	at Kentucky Wesleyan	Winchester, KY	W 17–0		
September 28	Winchester Athletic Club*	Lexington, KY	W 6–0 (forfeit)		
September 28	Louisville Manual Training High School*	Lexington, KY	W 30–0		
October 5	at Vanderbilt*	Dudley Field; Nashville, TN (rivalry)	L 0–40	1,800	
October 12	Morris Harvey*	Lexington, KY	W 29–0		
October 26	Hanover*	Lexington, KY	W 40–0		
November 9	at Tennessee*	Chilhowee Park; Knoxville, TN (rivalry)	T 0–0		
November 11	at Maryville (TN)*	Maryville, TN	W 5–2		
November 16	Georgetown (KY)	Lexington, KY	W 38–0		
November 28	Central University (KY)	Lexington, KY (rivalry)	W 11–0	4,000	
December 5	Kentucky University	Lexington, KY (rivalry)	W 5–0		
*Non-conference game
