= 1907 Knox Old Siwash football team =

American college football season

1907 Knox Old Siwash football
- Conference: Independent
- Record: 2–7
- Head coach: Harry M. Towne (1st season)

1907 Midwestern college football independents records
| | Conf. | | | Overall |
| Team | W | L | T | W | | L | | T |
|---|---|---|---|---|---|---|---|---|
| Marquette | | – | | 6 | – | 0 | – | 0 |
| North Dakota Agricultural | | – | | 3 | – | 0 | – | 0 |
| Lincoln (MO) | | – | | 1 | – | 0 | – | 0 |
| Notre Dame | | – | | 6 | – | 0 | – | 1 |
| Miami (OH) | | – | | 6 | – | 1 | – | 0 |
| Michigan | | – | | 5 | – | 1 | – | 0 |
| Mount Union | | – | | 9 | – | 2 | – | 0 |
| Fairmount | | – | | 8 | – | 2 | – | 0 |
| Iowa State | | – | | 6 | – | 2 | – | 0 |
| Lake Forest | | – | | 4 | – | 1 | – | 1 |
| South Dakota State | | – | | 5 | – | 2 | – | 0 |
| St. Vincent's (IL) | | – | | 5 | – | 2 | – | 0 |
| Wabash | | – | | 5 | – | 2 | – | 0 |
| Saint Louis | | – | | 7 | – | 3 | – | 0 |
| Western State Normal | | – | | 4 | – | 2 | – | 1 |
| Kansas State | | – | | 5 | – | 3 | – | 0 |
| Michigan State Normal | | – | | 3 | – | 2 | – | 0 |
| Wittenberg | | – | | 5 | – | 4 | – | 0 |
| Central Michigan | | – | | 3 | – | 3 | – | 0 |
| Drake | | – | | 3 | – | 4 | – | 1 |
| Ohio | | – | | 3 | – | 4 | – | 1 |
| Western Illinois | | – | | 2 | – | 3 | – | 0 |
| Franklin | | – | | 3 | – | 5 | – | 1 |
| Heidelberg | | – | | 2 | – | 4 | – | 1 |
| Butler | | – | | 1 | – | 3 | – | 2 |
| Carthage | | – | | 2 | – | 5 | – | 0 |
| Haskell | | – | | 2 | – | 6 | – | 1 |
| Chicago P&S | | – | | 1 | – | 3 | – | 0 |
| Detroit College | | – | | 1 | – | 3 | – | 0 |
| Northern Illinois State | | – | | 1 | – | 4 | – | 1 |
| Doane | | – | | 1 | – | 5 | – | 0 |
| St. Mary's (OH) | | – | | 0 | – | 4 | – | 0 |
| Baldwin–Wallace | | – | | 0 | – | 6 | – | 0 |

The 1907 Knox Old Siwash football team represented the Knox College of Illinois during the 1907 college football season.

== Schedule ==
| Date | Opponent | Site | Result |
|---|---|---|---|
| October 5 | Carthage | Galesburg, IL | W 10–0 |
| October 12 | Beloit | Galesburg, IL | W 26–10 |
| October 19 | Illinois State | Galesburg, IL | L 0–6 |
| October 26 | Monmouth (IL) | Monmouth, IL | L 0–30 |
| November 2 | Cornell (IA) | Galesburg, IL | L 4–34 |
| November 9 | at Notre Dame | Cartier Field; Notre Dame, IN | L 4–22 |
| November 16 | Lake Forest | Lake Forest, IL | L 0–62 |
| November 23 | Lombard | Galesburg, IL | L 4–18 |
| November 28 | Millikin | Decatur, IL | L 6–10 |
