= 1907 Michigan Wolverines football team =

American college football season

1907 Michigan Wolverines football
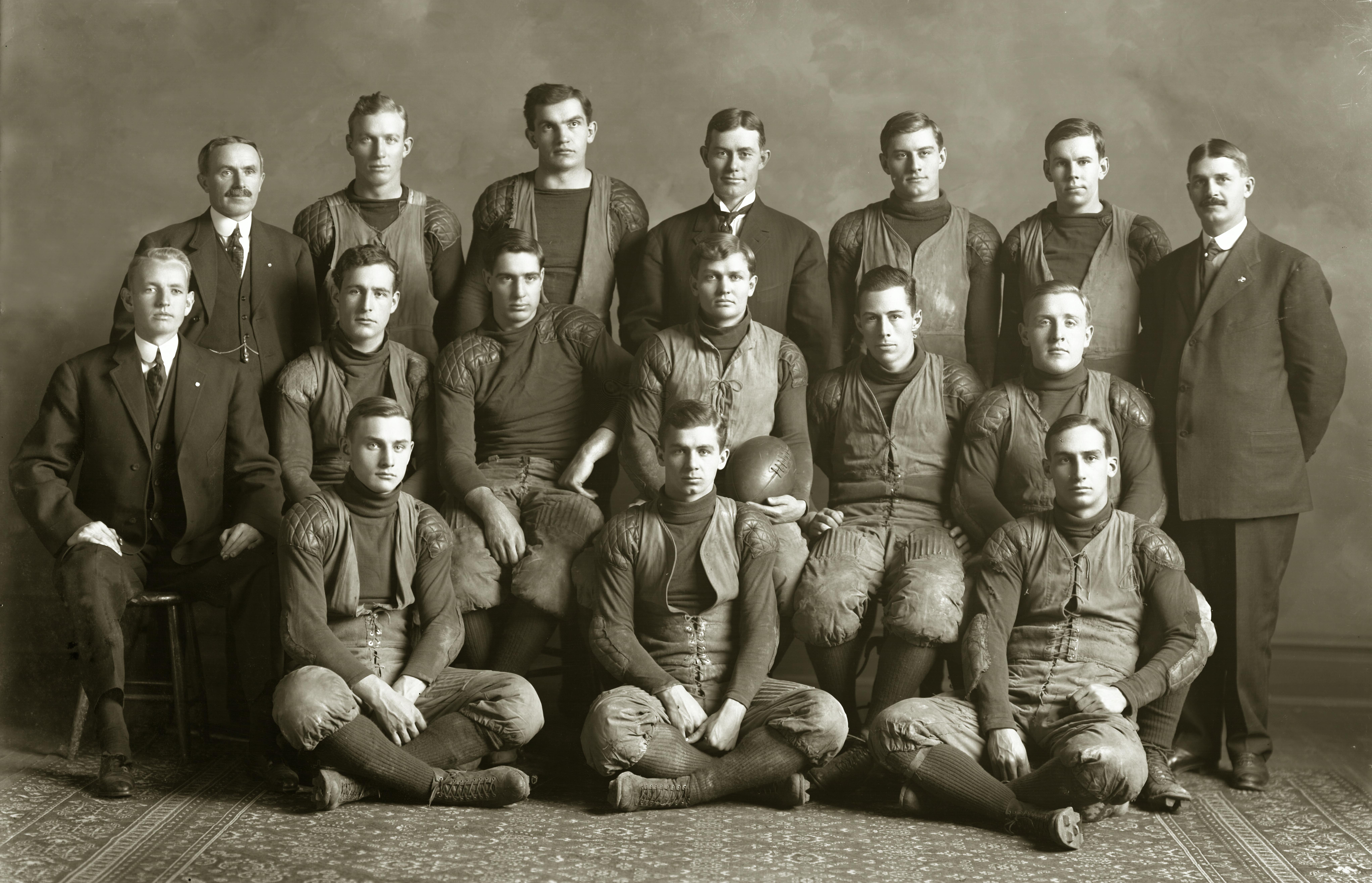
- Conference: Independent
- Record: 5–1
- Head coach: Fielding H. Yost (7th season)
- Captain: Paul Magoffin
- Home stadium: Ferry Field

1907 Midwestern college football independents records
	Conf.			Overall
Team	W	L	T	W		L		T
Marquette		–		6	–	0	–	0
North Dakota Agricultural		–		3	–	0	–	0
Lincoln (MO)		–		1	–	0	–	0
Notre Dame		–		6	–	0	–	1
Miami (OH)		–		6	–	1	–	0
Michigan		–		5	–	1	–	0
Mount Union		–		9	–	2	–	0
Fairmount		–		8	–	2	–	0
Iowa State		–		6	–	2	–	0
Lake Forest		–		4	–	1	–	1
South Dakota State		–		5	–	2	–	0
St. Vincent's (IL)		–		5	–	2	–	0
Wabash		–		5	–	2	–	0
Saint Louis		–		7	–	3	–	0
Western State Normal		–		4	–	2	–	1
Kansas State		–		5	–	3	–	0
Michigan State Normal		–		3	–	2	–	0
Wittenberg		–		5	–	4	–	0
Central Michigan		–		3	–	3	–	0
Drake		–		3	–	4	–	1
Ohio		–		3	–	4	–	1
Western Illinois		–		2	–	3	–	0
Franklin		–		3	–	5	–	1
Heidelberg		–		2	–	4	–	1
Butler		–		1	–	3	–	2
Carthage		–		2	–	5	–	0
Haskell		–		2	–	6	–	1
Chicago P&S		–		1	–	3	–	0
Detroit College		–		1	–	3	–	0
Northern Illinois State		–		1	–	4	–	1
Doane		–		1	–	5	–	0
St. Mary's (OH)		–		0	–	4	–	0
Baldwin–Wallace		–		0	–	6	–	0

The 1907 Michigan Wolverines football team represented the University of Michigan as an independent during the 1907 college football season. The team's head football coach was Fielding H. Yost in his seventh season at Michigan. The team finished the season with a record of 5–1, allowing an average of one point per game. The team did not give up a single first down in its first four games and won its first five games by shutouts, outscoring its opponents by a combined score of 107 to 0. In the final game of the season, the Wolverines lost, 6–0, to the Penn Quakers. The Quakers were in the early stages of a 23-game winning streak that was broken by the 1909 Michigan team.

Center Germany Schulz was selected as a first-team All-American by Walter Camp. In 1951, Schulz was selected as the greatest center in football history in a poll conducted by the National Football Foundation and became one of the initial inductees into the College Football Hall of Fame. Halfback Paul Magoffin was the team captain and led the team in scoring with 35 points and seven touchdowns. Right tackle Walter Rheinschild was the second leading scorer with 25 points. Five Michigan players received All-Western honors: Schulz, Magoffin, Rheinschild, "Octy" Graham, and Harry S. Hammond.

== Schedule ==
Date	Opponent	Site	Result	Attendance
October 5	Case	Ferry Field; Ann Arbor, MI	W 9–0	3,000
October 12	Michigan Agricultural	Ferry Field; Ann Arbor, MI (rivalry)	W 46–0	
October 19	vs. Wabash	Washington Field; Indianapolis, IN	W 22–0	8,000
October 26	Ohio State	Ferry Field; Ann Arbor, MI (rivalry)	W 22–0	7,000
November 2	at Vanderbilt	Dudley Field; Nashville, TN	W 8–0	8,000
November 16	Penn^{†}	Ferry Field; Ann Arbor, MI	L 0–6	19,500
^{†}Homecoming

== Season summary ==
=== Case ===
Case at Michigan

Team	1	2	Total
Case	0	0	0
• Michigan	0	9	9

- Date: October 5, 1907
- Location: Ferry Field • Ann Arbor, Michigan
- Game attendance: 3,000
- Referee: Rowe (Michigan)

Michigan opened its 1907 season with a 9–0 victory over the team from Cleveland's Case Scientific School. The game was played in front of a crowd estimated at 3,000 persons at Ferry Field. The game was the 11th meeting between the two programs, and Michigan had won all 10 of the prior games by a combined score of 319 to 25.

The game was scoreless in the first half. Michigan drove the ball to the Case 15-yard line early in the second half, and "Octy" Graham drop-kicked a field goal from the 20-yard line to give Michigan a 4–0 lead. Later in the half, Jack Loell scored the game's only touchdown on a five-yard run. On defense, the Wolverines did not allow Case to convert a first down. On offense, fumbles and a lack of success in forward passes stymied several drives. The Michigan Alumnus wrote that "Michigan's offensive playing fell far below the high standard of its defense." The Alumnus also noted that "Schulz was a rock at center and Loell and Rheinschild alternating at tackle and fullback both did splendid work."

Michigan's lineup against Case was Casey (left end), Crumpacker (left tackle), Watkins and Primeau (left guard), Schulz, (center), Graham (right guard), Loell and Rheinschild (right tackle), Evans and Witmire (right end), Wasmund (quarterback), Miller (left halfback), Rumney and Lehr (right halfback), and Rheinschild and Loell (fullback). Rowe of Michigan served as referee and umpire. The game was played in 20-minute halves.

=== Michigan Agricultural ===
Michigan Agricultural at Michigan

Team	1	2	Total
Michigan Agricultural	0	0	0
• Michigan	24	22	46

- Date: October 12, 1907
- Location: Ferry Field • Ann Arbor, Michigan
- Referee: Eldridge (Michigan)

In the second week of the season, Michigan defeated Michigan Agricultural, 46–0, at Ferry Field. It was the third game in the Michigan – Michigan State football rivalry. Michigan had won the two prior meetings by a combined score of 158 to 0.

In 40 minutes of play, Michigan scored eight touchdowns and did not allow a single first down to be made by the Aggies. Team captain Paul Magoffin made his first appearance of the season and scored five touchdowns. Walter Rheinschild scored two touchdowns, and Jack Loell scored one. "Octy" Graham converted six of eight extra point kicks. Right end Harry S. Hammond was praised for his punting, as several of his kicks spiraled for 50 yards. On offense, the Wolverines had used the forward pass with "great success" early in the game, but abandoned it with the game in hand, saving it for a time of "greater necessity." The Chicago Daily Tribune wrote that, "Michigan used the long forward pass from Loell to the ends with telling effect."

Michigan's lineup against the Aggies was Miller and Witmire (left end), Casey (left tackle), Embs (left guard), Schulz, (center), Graham (right guard), Rheinschild and Crumpacker (right tackle), Hammond (right end), Wasmund and Sullivan (quarterback), Magoffin and Miller (left halfback), Allerdice and Rumney (right halfback), and Loell and Rheinschild (fullback). Eldridge of Michigan served as referee. The game was played in 20-minute halves.

=== Vs. Wabash ===
Michigan vs. Wabash

Team	1	2	Total
• Michigan	6	16	22
Wabash	0	0	0

- Date: October 19, 1907
- Location: Washington Field •Indianapolis
- Game attendance: 8,000
- Referee: Esterline (Purdue)

On October 19, 1907, Michigan defeated the Wabash Little Giants, 22–0, at Washington Field in Indianapolis. The game was the first and only meeting between the schools. Although the bleachers were mostly filled with Wabash supporters presenting "a solid front of red", the game was also attended by a large gathering of Michigan alumni wearing "maize and blue." As the Michigan team ran onto the field, Michigan's "brass band" led the alumni in "The Victors." Vanderbilt coach Dan McGugin (who was also Yost's brother-in-law) and Col. J.B. Fite of Nashville (the father-in-law of Yost and McGugin) sat on the Michigan bench during the game. Wabash's head coach Francis M. Cayou was a member of the Omaha tribe and had played quarterback for the Carlisle Indians. According to the Chicago Daily Tribune, Wabash's cheer leader directed the Wabash fans to "yell in praise of the redskin coach, 'Cayou that's who, who's who, Cayou. Who's he, big chief! Ugh.'" The Little Giants compiled a record of 10–3–1 during the 1906 and 1907 seasons under Cayou.

The game was played under clear skies in what the Chicago Daily Tribune described as "ideal football weather." Dave Allerdice returned the opening kickoff 90 yards, but he fumbled on the next play from scrimmage. After neither team scored through most of the first half, Michigan recovered a fumble at the Wabash 30-yard line. Walter Rheinschild scored the touchdown shortly before the end of the half. "Octy" Graham kicked the extra pint, and Michigan led, 6–0, at halftime. The Michigan Alumnus gave credit to the Little Giants, who were outweighed by almost 20 pounds per player, for holding Michigan to a single touchdown in the first half.

Early in the second half, Dave Allerdice kicked a field goal, but the points were not allowed. Michigan later drove 40 yards on two 20-yard runs by Walter Rheinschild and Paul Magoffin. Magoffin's run was good for a touchdown, and Allerdice added his second extra point. Michigan led, 12–0. On the next drive, Michigan took the ball to Wabash's one-yard line, but was held on downs. Wabash was then forced to punt from behind its own goal line, and Jack Loell blocked the punt, and Prentiss Douglass recovered the ball for a touchdown. Harry S. Hammond kicked the extra point, and Michigan led 18–0. Graham added a field goal from the 45-yard line. Graham's kick hit the goal bar, but bounded across for four points. With Michigan ahead 22–0, Coach Yost played his substitutes and called a punting game for the remainder of the game. The Michigan Alumnus reported that the game was marked by "numerous spectacular plays" and "the new style of open play."

Michigan's lineup against Wabash was Miller and Witmire (left end), Casey (left tackle), Embs and Flanagan (left guard), Schulz, (center), Graham (right guard), Rheinschild (right tackle), Hammond (right end), Wasmund and Sullivan (quarterback), Magoffin and Douglass (left halfback), Allerdice and Rumney (right halfback), and Loell (fullback). Esterline of Purdue served as referee. The game was played in 35-minute halves.

=== Ohio State ===
Ohio State at Michigan

Team	1	2	Total
Ohio State	0	0	0
• Michigan	6	16	22

- Date: October 26, 1907
- Location: Ferry Field • Ann Arbor, Michigan
- Game attendance: 7,000
- Referee: McCornack (Dartmouth)

On October 26, 1907, Michigan defeated Ohio State, 22–0, in front of a crowd of 7,000 spectators at Ferry Field. The game was the ninth meeting in the Michigan–Ohio State football rivalry, with Michigan having won seven of the prior meetings and tied once.

The game was played in a cold rain and stiff wind, resulting in numerous fumbles and an inaccurate kicking game. Michigan's offense tried 10 forward passes in the game with seven completions for gains of 20 to 40 yards. The passes were thrown by William Wasmund and Dave Allerdice with Walter Rheinschild and Paul Magoffin as the principal receivers. Most of the first half was fought between midfield and Ohio State's 15-yard line. Near the end of the first half, Michigan began to employ its passing attack. Jack Loell scored the first touchdown on a short run, and "Octy" Graham kicked the extra point. In the second half, Magoffin caught a forward pass from Wasmund and eluded Ohio State's tacklers on a 40-yard touchdown play. Michigan missed the extra point and led, 11–0. Rheinschild later ran for a touchdown. The extra point kick failed, and Michigan led, 16–0. Rheinschild then scored a second touchdown on a forward pass from Wasmund, with Rheinschild running 40 yard after the catch. Allerdice converted the extra point. The Michigan Alumnus wrote that "the Yost 'style' of passing received a thorough vindication."

The game ended with Michigan in possession of the ball at the Ohio State one-yard line, poised to score another touchdown. After four games, the defense had not allowed a point to be scored or a first down to be gained. The Michigan Alumnus noted: "It is doubtful if any team in the country today can boast of four games played without yielding a single first down. Michigan's defense is all that could be desired." The Chicago Daily Tribune wrote: "On defensive Michigan was solid as a rock."

Michigan's lineup against Ohio State was Rumney and Witmire (left end), Casey (left tackle), Embs (left guard), Schulz, (center), Graham (right guard), Rheinschild (right tackle), Hammond (right end), Wasmund (quarterback), Magoffin and Lehr (left halfback), Loell and Allerdice (right halfback), and Douglass and Sullivan (fullback). McCornack of Dartmouth served as referee. The game was played in 35-minute halves.

=== At Vanderbilt ===
Michigan at Vanderbilt

Team	1	2	Total
• Michigan	8	0	8
Vanderbilt	0	0	0

- Date: November 2, 1907
- Location: Dudley Field • Nashville, Tennessee
- Game attendance: 8,000
- Referee: Bradley Walker

On November 2, 1907, Michigan defeated Vanderbilt, 8–0, in front of a crowd of 8,000 at Dudley Field in Nashville. The crowd was the largest up to that date to see a football game south of the Mason–Dixon line. The game was "a big society event in the south", and the elite of Nashville, Chattanooga, and Memphis were in attendance. Students from every college and preparatory school in Tennessee, including Belmont College and "other seminaries", also attended the game. The game matched Michigan head coach Fielding H. Yost against his former player and brother-in-law, Dan McGugin. Owing to the relationship between Yost and McGugin, the two teams played nine times between 1905 and 1923, with Michigan winning eight games and tying one.

The game was played under clear skies and warm weather, the temperature being too warm "for the invaders' liking." Michigan drove deep into Vanderbilt territory on several drives, but was unable to push the ball across the goal line. "Octy" Graham scored all of Michigan's points, converting on two of three field goal attempts. The tide of the game was set when Vanderbilt's quarterback, Sam Costen, dropped six of the first punts he received. Two of Costen's fumble led to Michigan's field goals. The first score was set up when Costen fumbled a punt at the Commodore's 15-yard line. Rumney recovered the fumble, and Graham kicked a field goal from the 25-yard line. Graham's second field goal was set up when Costen fumbled another punt, this one recovered by Prentiss Douglass at the 35-yard line. Michigan drove to the five-yard line, where Vanderbilt took over on downs. On the possession that followed, Vanderbilt was unable to gain, and Michigan took over at the 15-yard line after Vanderbilt was forced to punt from behind its goal line. After three runs failed to gain the yardage for first down, Graham converted his second field goal. In the second half, Michigan played a punting game. Right end Harry S. Hammond ran for a 35-yard gain on a fake kick for the longest gain of the game. In the closing minutes of the game, Jack Loell led a drive to Vanderbilt's one-yard line when time expired. Michigan attempted four passes, all incomplete.

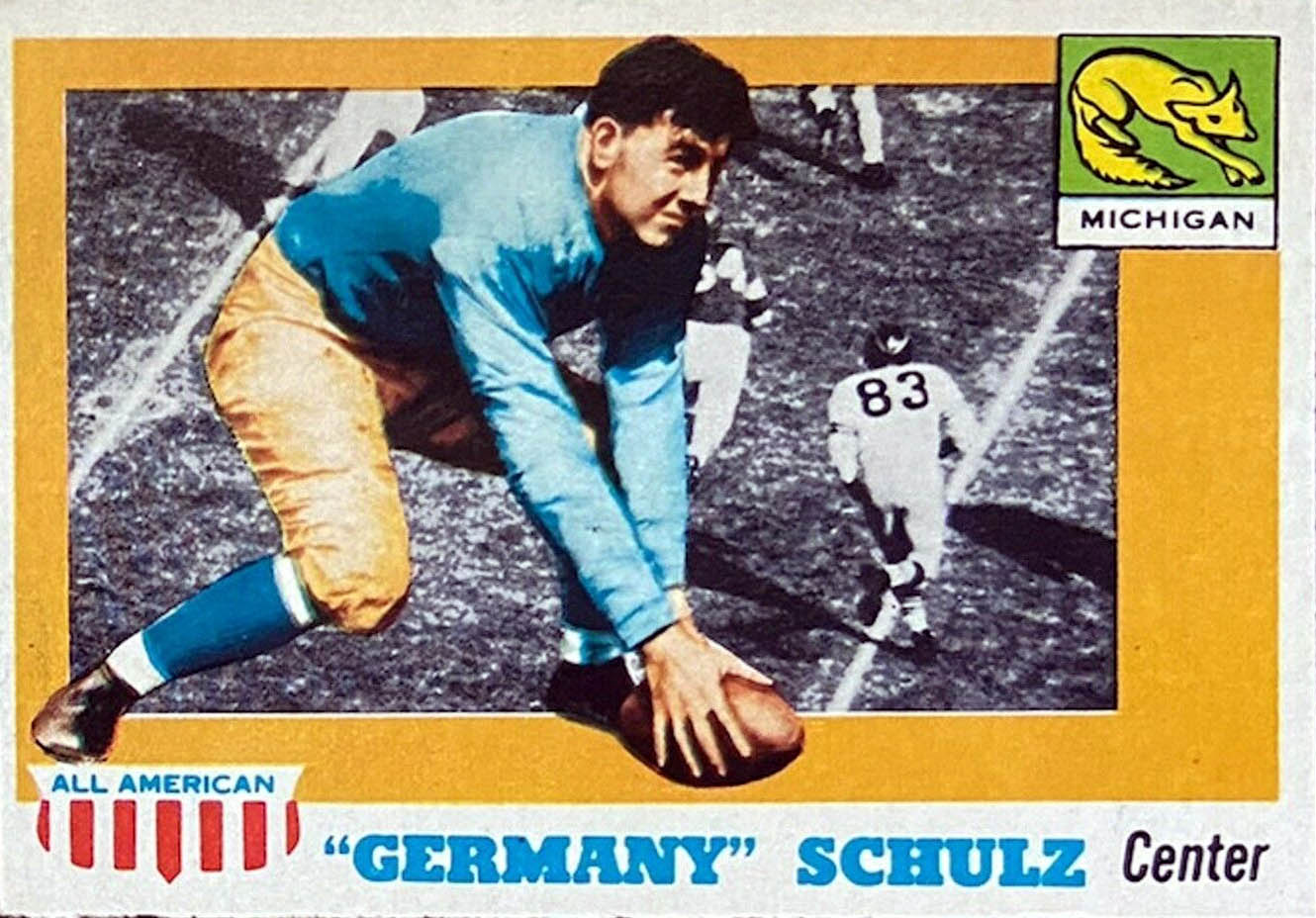
Schulz depicted on a football card, c. 1955

The game most prominently featured a duel between star German centers. The Michigan Alumnus wrote: "'Germany' Schulz was far and away the star of the game. In his usual style he was in every play, tackling runners for loss, falling on the ball in fumbles, and opening wide holes in the line for Michigan gains. . . . [H]e showed conclusively that he has no equal in the keystone position." A Nashville source wrote "In the duel of centers, Stone of Vanderbilt, had the best of "Germany" Schulz. Michigan's massive center. Stone's play was spectacular all the way." In 1939, Grantland Rice selected Schulz and Stone respectively as the greatest and second-greatest centers of all-time.

Michigan's lineup against Vanderbilt was Rumney (left end), Embs (left tackle), Casey (left guard), Schulz, (center), Graham (right guard), Rheinschild (right tackle), Hammond (right end), Wasmund (quarterback), Magoffin (left halfback), Douglass and Allerdice (right halfback), and Loell (fullback). Bradley Walker of Virginia served as referee, and Neil Snow of Michigan was the umpire. The game was played in 35-minute halves.

=== Penn ===
Penn at Michigan

Team	1	2	Total
• Penn	6	0	6
Michigan	0	0	0

- Date: November 16, 1907
- Location: Ferry Field • Ann Arbor, Michigan
- Game attendance: 19,500
- Referee: Murphy (Brown)

Michigan concluded its season on November 16, 1907, with a 6–0 loss to Penn in front of a crowd of nearly 20,000 spectators in Ann Arbor. After leaving the Big Ten Conference, Michigan played annual rivalry games against Penn at or near the end of the season. Penn was one of the dominant football programs of the era, winning seven national championships between 1894 and 1912 (including the 1908 national championship). The loss was the first sustained by Michigan at Ferry Field. Penn's left guard Gallagher scored the game's only touchdown, and right end Scarlett kicked the extra point. A controversial ruling resulted in a touchdown by Michigan being called back.

Michigan's lineup against Penn was Rumney (left end), Casey (left tackle), Embs (left guard), Schulz, (center), Graham (right guard), Rheinschild (right tackle), Hammond (right end), Wasmund (quarterback), Magoffin (left halfback), Allerdice and Miller (right halfback), and Watkins and Loell (fullback). Murphy of Brown served as referee. The game was played in 35-minute halves.

=== Post-season ===
At the end of the 1907 season, several Michigan players were recognized on the All-American and All-Western teams. Germany Schulz was the only Western player included on Walter Camp's All-American first team in Collier's Weekly. Camp also recognized Harry S. Hammond and Paul Magoffin with honorable mention on his All-American team. E. C. Patterson of Chicago picked the All-Western team for Collier's. He selected Schulz and Hammond as first-team All-Western player and included Magoffin and "Octy" Graham as second-team selections. The Michigan Daily published a consensus All-Western team based on its averaging of the All-Western teams and included four Michigan players on the consensus team: Schulz, Magoffin, Hammond, and Walter Rheinschild.

== Players ==
=== Starters ===
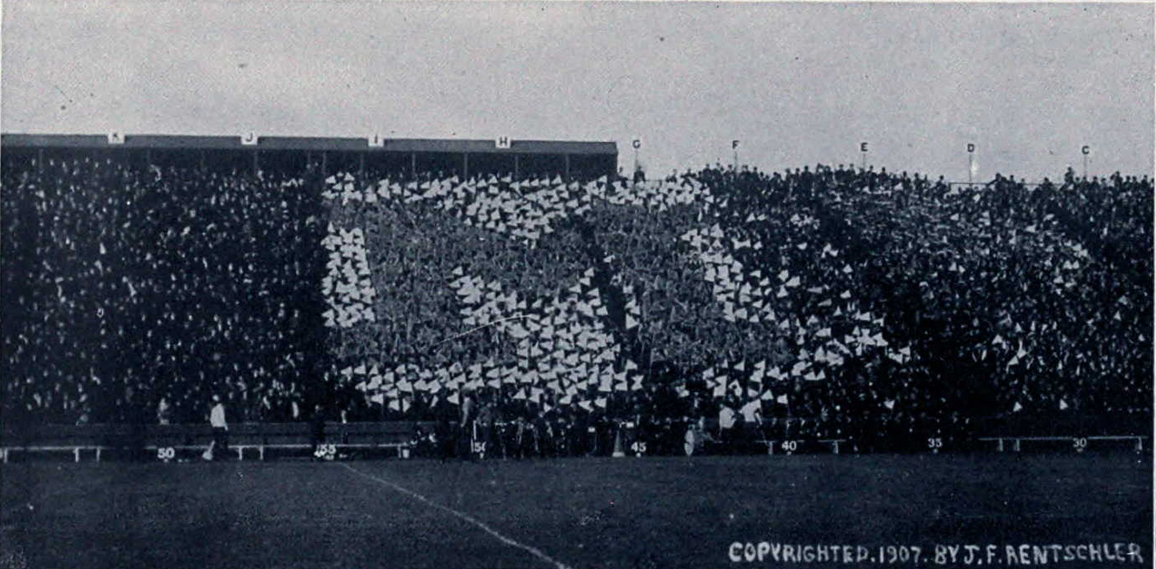
"The Human M" performed at Ferry Field, 1907

The following 12 players received varsity "M" letters for their participation on the 1907 football team:

- Dave Allerdice, Indianapolis, Indiana – started 3 games at right halfback
- William M. Casey, Cedar Falls, Iowa – started 4 games at left tackle, 1 game at left end, 1 game at left guard
- William J. Embs, Escanaba, Michigan – started 4 games at left guard, 1 game at left tackle
- Walter D. Graham, Chicago – started 6 games at right guard
- Harry S. Hammond, Chicago – started 5 games at right end
- John L. "Jack" Loell, Escanaba, Michigan – started 4 games at fullback, 1 game at right tackle
- Paul Magoffin, Washington, D.C. – started 5 games at left halfback
- Walter Rheinschild, Los Angeles – started 5 games at right tackle, 1 game at fullback
- Mason P. Rumney, Detroit – started 3 games at left end, 1 game at right halfback
- Germany Schulz, Fort Wayne, Indiana – started 6 games at center
- William Wasmund, Detroit – started 6 games at quarterback
- James K. Watkins, Ann Arbor, Michigan – started 1 game at left guard, 1 game at fullback

=== Reserves ===
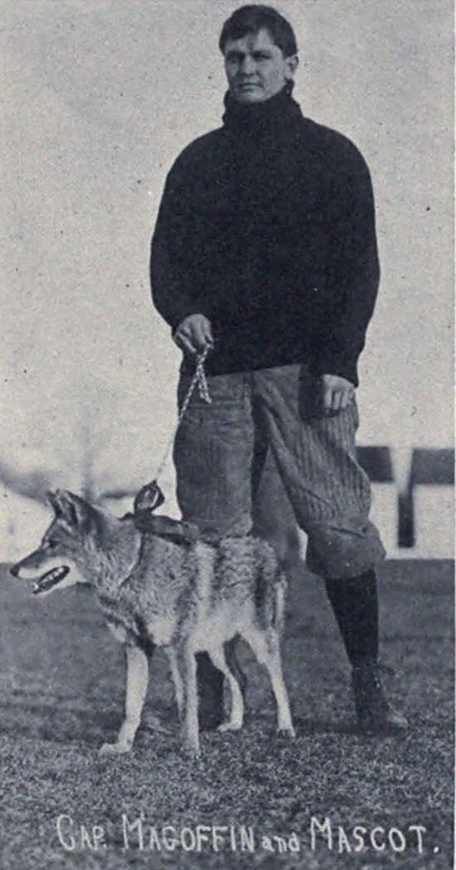
Paul Magoffin and the Michigan football team mascot

- Albert Benbrook, Chicago
- Hubert A. Brennan, L'Anse, Michigan
- Albert R. Chandler, Salem, Massachusetts
- Paul Scott Crampton, St. Clair, Michigan
- Maurice E. Crumpacker, Valparaiso, Indiana – 187 pounds, 5 feet, 11-1/2 inches; started 1 game at left tackle
- Ralph Culley, Avon, New York
- Wilbur M. Cunningham, Benton Harbor, Michigan
- Prentiss Douglass, Martinsville, Illinois – 165 pounds, 5 feet, 10 inches; started 2 games at right halfback
- Charles W. Eaman, Garden City, Kansas
- William P. Edmunds, Youngstown, Ohio
- Albert de Valois Evans, Cheboygan, Michigan – started 1 game at right end
- Fred N. Featherstone, Conneaut, Ohio
- Eugene Flanigan, Fredonia, New York – left guard, 227 pounds, 6 feet, 0 inches
- Donald W. Green, Saginaw, Michigan
- Harold E. Humphrey, Kalamazoo, Michigan
- Thomas M. Joyce, Missoula, Montana
- Edward H. Kelly, Ironwood, Michigan
- Joseph E. Kelly, Lowell, Michigan
- Jesse R. Langley, Alva, Oklahoma
- Clarence Emanuel Lehr, Escanaba, Michigan – left halfback, 166 pounds, 5 feet, 11 inches
- Charles H. Lillie, Grand Rapids, Michigan
- Fred L. Liskow, Saginaw, Michigan
- Glenn R. Madison, Benton Harbor, Michigan
- James Joy Miller, Detroit, Michigan – 165 pounds, 5 feet, 8 inches; started 2 games at left end, 1 game at left halfback
- Joseph Primeau, Marquette, Michigan
- Lawrence H. Roblee, St. Joseph, Michigan
- Keith S. Simpson, Carrollton, Illinois
- John Thomas Sullivan, Peoria, Illinois
- Horace A. Treat, Adrian, Michigan
- Edward D. Vosbury, Binghamton, New York
- Roe D. Watson, Alton, Illinois
- Frederick T. Witmire, Ypsilanti, Michigan

=== Scoring leaders ===
Player	Touchdowns	Extra points	Field goals	Points
Paul Magoffin	7	0	0	35
Walter Rheinschild	5	0	0	25
"Octy" Graham	0	7	4	24
Jack Loell	3	0	0	15
Prentiss Douglass	1	0	0	5
Dave Allerdice	0	3	0	3
Harry S. Hammond	0	1	0	1
Totals	16	11	4	107

== Awards and honors ==
- Captain: Paul Magoffin
- All-American: Germany Schulz (WC-1; CW-2)
- All-Western: Germany Schulz (Collier's, 1st; Consensus, 1st), Harry S. Hammond (Colliers, 1st; Consensus, 1st); Paul Magoffin (Consensus, 1st; Collier's, 2nd); Walter Rheinschild (Consensus, 1st); "Octy" Graham (Collier's, 2nd)

== Coaching staff ==
- Head coach: Fielding H. Yost
- Trainer: Keene Fitzpatrick
- Manager: Charles Thornburg
