= 1907 Notre Dame football team =

American college football season

1907 Notre Dame football
- Conference: Independent
- Record: 6–0–1
- Head coach: Thomas A. Barry (2nd season)
- Captain: Dom Callicrate
- Home stadium: Cartier Field

1907 Midwestern college football independents records
	Conf.			Overall
Team	W	L	T	W		L		T
Marquette		–		6	–	0	–	0
North Dakota Agricultural		–		3	–	0	–	0
Lincoln (MO)		–		1	–	0	–	0
Notre Dame		–		6	–	0	–	1
Miami (OH)		–		6	–	1	–	0
Michigan		–		5	–	1	–	0
Mount Union		–		9	–	2	–	0
Fairmount		–		8	–	2	–	0
Iowa State		–		6	–	2	–	0
Lake Forest		–		4	–	1	–	1
South Dakota State		–		5	–	2	–	0
St. Vincent's (IL)		–		5	–	2	–	0
Wabash		–		5	–	2	–	0
Saint Louis		–		7	–	3	–	0
Western State Normal		–		4	–	2	–	1
Kansas State		–		5	–	3	–	0
Michigan State Normal		–		3	–	2	–	0
Wittenberg		–		5	–	4	–	0
Central Michigan		–		3	–	3	–	0
Drake		–		3	–	4	–	1
Ohio		–		3	–	4	–	1
Western Illinois		–		2	–	3	–	0
Franklin		–		3	–	5	–	1
Heidelberg		–		2	–	4	–	1
Butler		–		1	–	3	–	2
Carthage		–		2	–	5	–	0
Haskell		–		2	–	6	–	1
Chicago P&S		–		1	–	3	–	0
Detroit College		–		1	–	3	–	0
Northern Illinois State		–		1	–	4	–	1
Doane		–		1	–	5	–	0
St. Mary's (OH)		–		0	–	4	–	0
Baldwin–Wallace		–		0	–	6	–	0

The 1907 Notre Dame football team was an American football team that represented the University of Notre Dame as an independent during the 1907 college football season. In their second and final season under head coach Thomas A. Barry, the team compiled a 6–0–1 record and outscored opponents by a total 137 of 20. Against major opponents, Notre Dame defeated Purdue and played a scoreless tie with Indiana.

No Notre Dame players received honors on the 1907 All-America college football team or the 1907 All-Western college football team. Halfback Dom Callicrate was the team captain.

The team played its home games at Cartier Field in Notre Dame, Indiana.

== Schedule ==
Date	Opponent	Site	Result	Source
October 12	Chicago Physicians and Surgeons	Cartier Field; Notre Dame, IN	W 32–0	
October 19	Franklin (IN)	Cartier Field; Notre Dame, IN	W 23–0	
October 26	Olivet	Cartier Field; Notre Dame, IN	W 22–4	
November 2	Indiana	Cartier Field; Notre Dame, IN	T 0–0	
November 9	Knox	Cartier Field; Notre Dame, IN	W 22–4	
November 23	at Purdue	Stuart Field; West Lafayette, IN (rivalry)	W 17–0	
November 28	at St. Vincent's (IL)	Chicago, IL	W 21–12	

== Personnel ==
=== Players ===
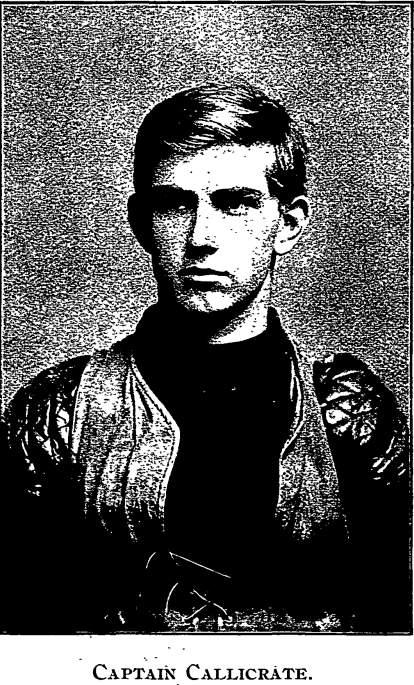
Dom Callicrate

- John Berteling, quarterback
- Henry Burdick, end
- Chester Burke, guard
- Dom Callicrate, captain and halfback
- Clarence Cripe, halfback
- Sam Dolan, tackle and guard
- Paul Donovan, tackle
- Edward Lynch, tackle
- Paul McDonald, halfback
- Albert Mertes, center, 159 pounds
- Harry Miller, center
- Frank Munson, end
- Peter O'Leary, fullback
- Robert "Possum" Paine, guard
- Billy Ryan, quarterback
- Fay Wood, end

=== Coaching staff ===
- Head coach: Thomas A. Barry
- Manager: T. Paul McGannon
- Assistant manager: Bob Bracken
