= 1907 Ohio State Buckeyes football team =

American college football season

1907 Ohio State Buckeyes football
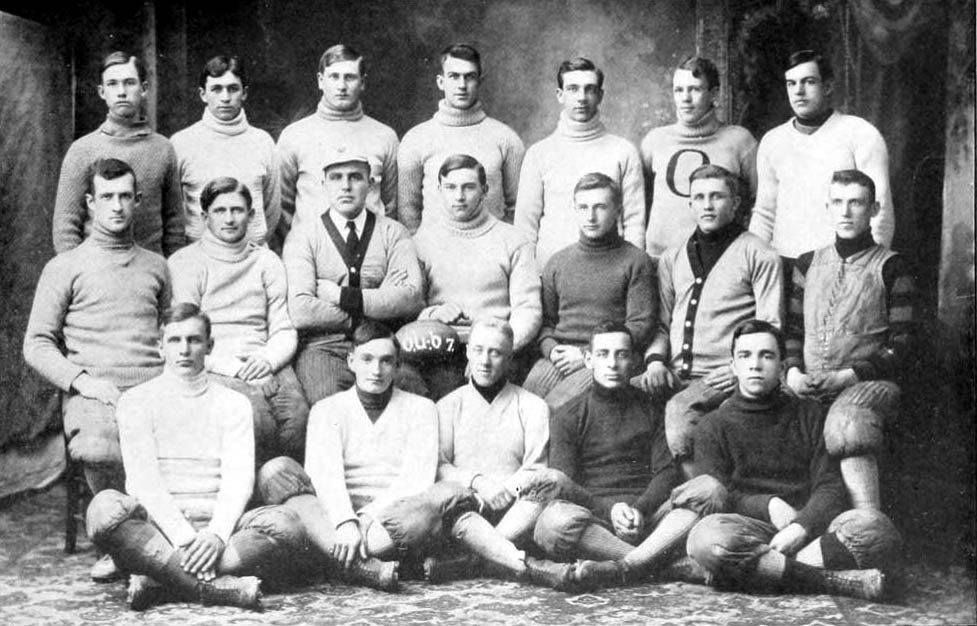
- Conference: Ohio Athletic Conference
- Record: 7–2–1 (5–1–1 OAC)
- Head coach: Albert E. Herrnstein (2nd season)
- Home stadium: Ohio Field

1907 Ohio Athletic Conference football standings
	Conf.					Overall
Team	W		L		T	W		L		T
Western Reserve $	5	–	1	–	0	8	–	1	–	0
Ohio State	5	–	1	–	1	7	–	2	–	1
Oberlin	3	–	1	–	0	6	–	2	–	0
Case	5	–	2	–	0	6	–	3	–	0
Kenyon	3	–	4	–	0	4	–	4	–	0
Ohio Wesleyan	2	–	3	–	0	7	–	3	–	0
Wooster	1	–	4	–	1	2	–	4	–	1
Denison	1	–	5	–	0	3	–	5	–	0
Heidelberg	0	–	4	–	0	2	–	4	–	0
$ – Conference champion

The 1907 Ohio State Buckeyes football team was an American football team that represented Ohio State University during the 1907 college football season. The Buckeyes compiled a 7–2–1 record and outscored their opponents by a combined total of 160 to 49 in their second season under head coach Albert E. Herrnstein.

== Schedule ==
Date	Opponent	Site	Result	Attendance
September 28	Otterbein*	Ohio Field; Columbus, OH	W 28–0	
October 5	Muskingum*	Ohio Field; Columbus, OH	W 16-0	
October 12	Denison	Ohio Field; Columbus, OH	W 28–0	
October 19	Wooster	Ohio Field; Columbus, OH	T 6–6	
October 26	at Michigan*	Ferry Field; Ann Arbor, MI (rivalry)	L 0–22	7,000
November 2	Kenyon	Ohio Field; Columbus, OH	W 12–0	
November 9	Oberlin	Ohio Field; Columbus, OH	W 22–10	
November 16	Case	Ohio Field; Columbus, OH	L 9–11	
November 23	Heidelberg	Ohio Field; Columbus, OH	W 28–0	
November 28	Ohio Wesleyan	Ohio Field; Columbus, OH	W 16–0	
*Non-conference game
