= Paul Magoffin =

American football player and coach (1883–1956)

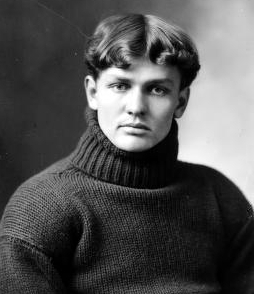
- University of Michigan photograph

Biographical details
- Born: March 30, 1885; Kansas, U.S.
- Died: February 1, 1956 (aged 70)

Playing career
- 1904–1907: Michigan
- Position: Halfback

Coaching career (HC unless noted)
- 1908: North Dakota State
- 1909: Michigan (assistant)
- 1910: George Washington

Head coaching record
- Overall: 4–5–2

Accomplishments and honors

Championships
- National (1904)

Paul Parker "Maggie" Magoffin (March 30, 1883 – February 1, 1956) was an American football player. He played left halfback for Fielding H. Yost's University of Michigan Wolverines football teams of 1904, 1905, 1906 and 1907, and was captain of the 1907 team. He later served as a football coach at North Dakota State University and George Washington University.

== Early years ==
Magoffin first played football on a Kansas high school team. He later ran track and played two years of football for Central High School in Washington, D.C. He later attended the Academy at Marietta and played one year for of football for Marietta College in Marietta, Ohio. At Marietta, Magoffin played for William C. "King" Cole, who had previously been a star player for Fielding H. Yost at the University of Michigan.

== University of Michigan ==
In 1904, Magoffin transferred to the University of Michigan, began playing on the freshman team, but played in several games for the varsity team, though he was not awarded a varsity letter for the 1904 season. He became a starter at left halfback for the 1905 Michigan Wolverines football team that compiled a 12–1 record and outscored its opponents by a combined total of 495 to 2. He continued as a starter at left halfback on the 1906 and 1907 Michigan teams. The Michigan Alumnus in January 1907 described Magoffin's contributions as follows:

"Magoffin has shown himself to be a remarkably fast and untiring player on both offense and defense, although slow in rounding into physical shape, owing to his later return to the University. He did his greatest work in the Pennsylvania contest, fighting gamely and stubbornly to the end. His repeated fierce tackling of Hollenbeck for losses was one of the redeeming features of that game for the Michigan spectators."

On November 3, 1907, Magoffin became the first player to catch a forward pass for a touchdown in a Michigan – Ohio State game, a 25-yard pass from quarterback Billy Wasmund. Magoffin scored five times during Michigan's 46–0 victory over Ohio State in 1907. The 1907 team captained by Magoffin won its first five games without allowing a point to be scored. The Wolverines lost the final game of the season to Penn by a score of 6–0, though Coach Yost complained loudly that Michigan had been robbed of touchdown in the game. They disputed play was a 35-yard touchdown pass to Magoffin that was disallowed by the referee. Yost said of the play, "In order to reach Magoffin, thirty-five yards ahead, the ball must have gone from Allerdice over the line of scrimmage at least fifteen yards to the left of where it was put in play. I know that, after having worked with that play for two years, and I was not taking any chances with it. Magoffin's touchdown was as legal as any play I ever saw on a football field."

== Coaching and officiating ==
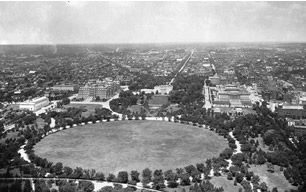
The White House Ellipse as it appeared when Magoffin led his Hatchetites in practice there

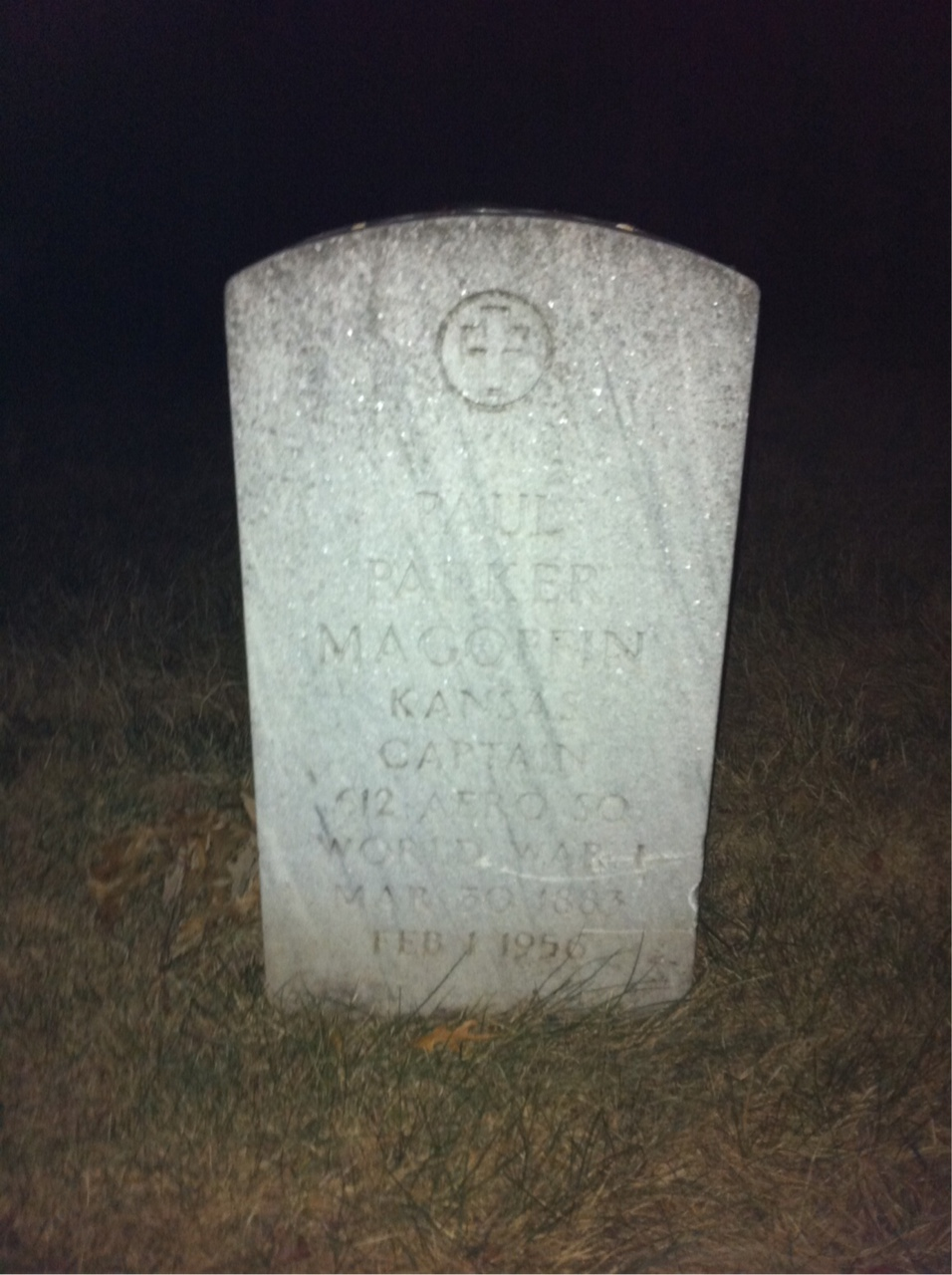
Grave at Arlington National Cemetery

In July 1908, after graduating from the University of Michigan as part of the literary class of 1908, Magoffin was hired as the athletic director and head football coach for the North Dakota Agricultural College "Aggies," now known as the North Dakota State Bison.

In 1910, Magoffin was the football coach for the George Washington University "Hatchetities" in Washington, D.C. In September 1910, The Washington Post reported that Coach Magoffin led his George Washington football team in practice sessions on the White House Ellipse.

Magoffin served as an official in college and high school football games for at least 32 years from 1912 to 1943. In December 1914, he was married in Philadelphia to Edith Jane Young.

During World War I Magoffin commanded the 612th Aero Squadron of the United States Army Air Service, stationed at the Wilbur Wright Air Service Depot in Fairfield, Ohio. After his death in 1956 he was buried at Arlington National Cemetery.

== Head coaching record ==
Year	Team	Overall	Conference	Standing	Bowl/playoffs
North Dakota Agricultural Aggies (Independent) (1908)
1908	North Dakota Agricultural	2–3			
North Dakota Agricultural:		2–3			
George Washington Hatchetites (Independent) (1910)
1910	George Washington	2–2–2			
George Washington:		2–2–2			
Total:		4–5–2			
