= Arthur McFarland =

American football player and coach (1874–1959)

Biographical details
- Born: July 7, 1874; Springfield, Ohio, U.S.
- Died: August 21, 1959 (aged 85); Martins Ferry, Ohio, U.S.

Playing career

Football
- 1896–1897: Wheeling Tigers
- 1897–1898: Greensburg Athletic Association
- 1899: Washington & Jefferson
- 1900: Greensburg Athletic Association
- 1902: Philadelphia Athletics
- 1903: Franklin Athletic Club
- 1905: Massillon Tigers
- Position: Tackle

Coaching career (HC unless noted)

Football
- 1906–1908: Ohio

Baseball
- 1907: Ohio

Head coaching record
- Overall: 13–10–1 (football); 10–2 (baseball)

Arthur Lamont "Tiger" (or "Tige") McFarland (July 7, 1874 – August 21, 1959) was an early professional American football player who played with the Greensburg Athletic Association and later the Philadelphia Athletics in the 1902 version of the National Football League and for the 1903 US football champions, the Franklin Athletic Club. McFarland also won, with Franklin, the 1903 World Series of Football, held that December at Madison Square Garden. He played for the Massillon Tigers in 1905, when the team won the Ohio Independent Championship, effectively the world professional football championship. Prior to his time with known professional teams, he developed his football skills with the Wheeling, West Virginia Tigers.

In 1899, with his previous year's team of Greensburg on a one-year hiatus, McFarland entered and played for Washington & Jefferson College. Football authority Caspar Whitney called out W&J that year for fielding McFarland and other players with professional experience, writing in Harper's Weekly that "no self-respecting college should meet [W&J] on the gridiron". McFarland rejoined Greensburg in 1900.

From 1906 to 1908, McFarland was the head football coach at Ohio University, compiling a record of 13–10–1 record in three seasons. He died at hospital in Martins Ferry, Ohio in 1959.

== Head coaching record ==
=== Football ===
Year	Team	Overall	Conference	Standing	Bowl/playoffs
Ohio Green and White (Independent) (1906–1908)
1906	Ohio	7–1			
1907	Ohio	3–4–1			
1908	Ohio	3–5			
Ohio:		13–10–1			
Total:		13–10–1			
