= Dom Callicrate =

American football player and coach (1885–1979)

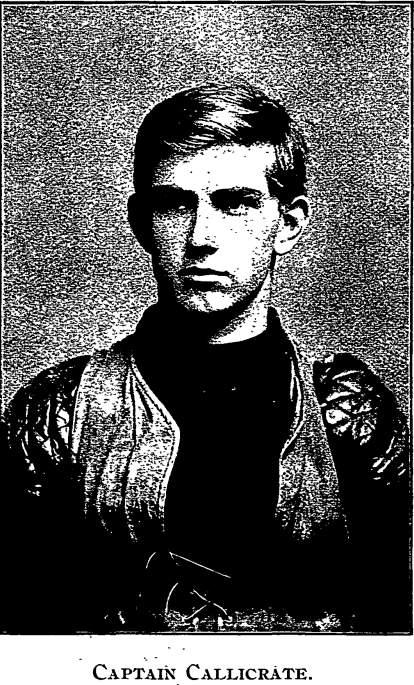
- Callicrate at Notre Dame

Biographical details
- Born: September 17, 1885; South Bend, Indiana, U.S.
- Died: May 30, 1979 (aged 93); Brookings, Oregon, U.S.

Playing career
- 1905–1907: Notre Dame
- Positions: End, halfback

Coaching career (HC unless noted)
- 1909–1916: Columbia (OR)

Administrative career (AD unless noted)
- 1909–1916: Columbia (OR)

Dominic Leo Callicrate (September 17, 1885 – May 30, 1979) was an American college football player and coach.

Callicrate was born in South Bend, Indiana, in 1885. He played college football at Notre Dame, at the end position in 1905 and at halfback in 1906 and 1907. In November 1906, he was selected as the captain of the 1907 Notre Dame football team. He led the 1907 team to an undefeated 6–0–1 record. He received a civil engineering degree from Notre Dame in 1908.

In September 1909, Callicrate was hired as the head football coach and physical director at Columbia University (later renamed the University of Portland) in Portland, Oregon. He held those positions at Columbia from 1909 to 1916. He also taught math at Columbia.

In later years, he worked as a civil engineer and was affiliated with the firm of Foster & Kleiser until 1955. He died in Brookings, Oregon, in 1979 at age 93.
