= Nelson A. Kellogg =

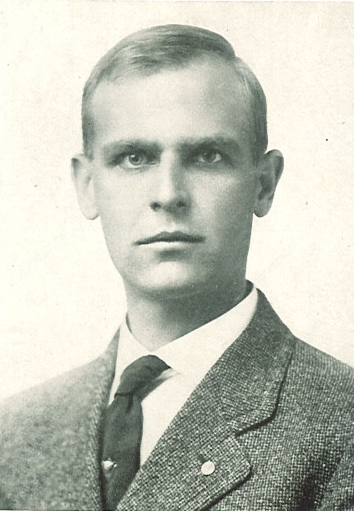
- Kellogg pictured in Epitome 1934, Lehigh yearbook

Biographical details
- Born: January 30, 1881; East Richford, Vermont, U.S.
- Died: November 23, 1945 (aged 64); Central Lake, Michigan, U.S.

Playing career

Track and field
- c. 1904: Michigan

Coaching career (HC unless noted)

Football
- 1906–1909: Northern Illinois State Normal

Basketball
- 1906–1910: Northern Illinois State Normal

Baseball
- 1907–1910: Northern Illinois State Normal

Administrative career (AD unless noted)
- 1910–1917: Iowa
- 1919–1930: Purdue
- 1934–1939: Lehigh

Head coaching record
- Overall: 8–17–3 (football); 17–27 (basketball); 26–17 (baseball)

Nelson Austin Kellogg (January 30, 1881 – November 23, 1945) was a track athlete, American football, basketball, and baseball coach, and college athletics administrator. He served as the head football coach at Northern Illinois State Normal School—now known as Northern Illinois University—from 1906 to 1909, compiling a record of 8–17–3. Kellogg was also the head basketball coach at Northern Illinois from 1906 to 1910, amassing a record of 17–27, and the head baseball coach at the school from 1907 to 1910, tallying a mark of 26–17. He ran track at the University of Michigan, from which he graduated in 1904.

Kellogg left Northern Illinois to become the University of Iowa's first athletic director in 1910 and served in that capacity until leaving for World War I in 1917. He was the athletic director at Purdue University from 1919 to 1930 and at Lehigh University from 1934 until he retired on February 11, 1939. Kellogg died at the age of 64 on November 23, 1945, at his home in Central Lake, Michigan.

== Head coaching record ==
=== Football ===
Year	Team	Overall	Conference	Standing	Bowl/playoffs
Northern Illinois State Normal (Independent) (1906–1909)
1906	Northern Illinois State Normal	4–2–1			
1907	Northern Illinois State Normal	1–4–1			
1908	Northern Illinois State Normal	1–5–1			
1909	Northern Illinois State Normal	2–6			
Northern Illinois State Normal:		8–17–3			
Total:		8–17–3			
