= 1907 Penn Quakers football team =

American college football season

1907 Penn Quakers football
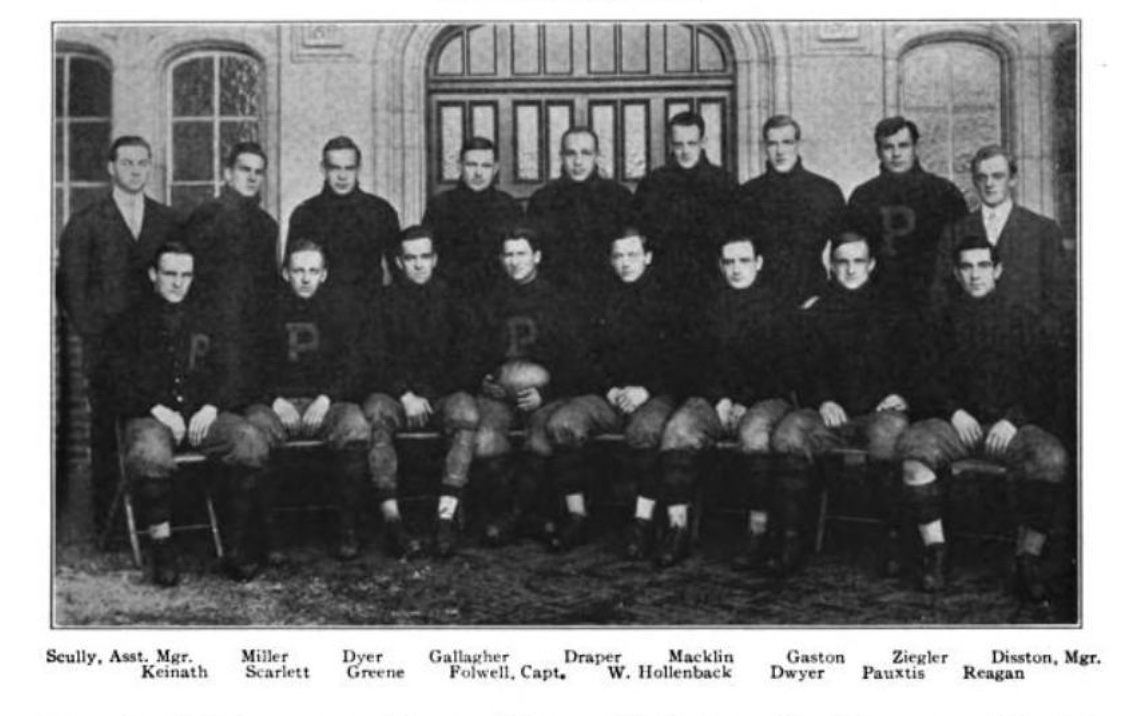

National champion
- Conference: Independent
- Record: 11–1
- Head coach: Carl S. Williams (6th season)
- Captain: Bob Folwell
- Home stadium: Franklin Field

1907 Eastern college football independents records
	Conf.			Overall
Team	W	L	T	W		L		T
Yale		–		9	–	0	–	1
Dartmouth		–		8	–	0	–	1
Penn		–		11	–	1	–	0
Carlisle		–		10	–	1	–	0
Temple		–		4	–	0	–	2
Fordham		–		6	–	1	–	1
Cornell		–		8	–	2	–	0
Western U. of Penn.		–		8	–	2	–	0
Princeton		–		7	–	2	–	0
Washington & Jefferson		–		7	–	2	–	0
Lafayette		–		7	–	2	–	1
Lehigh		–		7	–	2	–	1
Swarthmore		–		6	–	2	–	0
Army		–		6	–	2	–	1
NYU		–		5	–	2	–	0
Vermont		–		4	–	1	–	2
Harvard		–		7	–	3	–	0
Brown		–		7	–	3	–	0
Penn State		–		6	–	4	–	0
Syracuse		–		5	–	3	–	1
Drexel		–		3	–	2	–	2
Colgate		–		4	–	4	–	1
Geneva		–		4	–	5	–	2
Dickinson		–		3	–	4	–	2
Amherst		–		3	–	4	–	1
Tufts		–		3	–	4	–	1
Franklin & Marshall		–		4	–	6	–	0
Rutgers		–		3	–	5	–	1
Springfield Training School		–		2	–	4	–	2
Bucknell		–		4	–	7	–	0
New Hampshire		–		1	–	5	–	2
Villanova		–		1	–	5	–	1
Holy Cross		–		1	–	7	–	2
Wesleyan		–		1	–	7	–	1
Carnegie Tech		–		1	–	8	–	0

The 1907 Penn Quakers football team represented the University of Pennsylvania as an independent during the 1907 college football season. They finished with an 11–1 record and claim 1907 as a national championship season. They outscored their opponents 256 to 40.

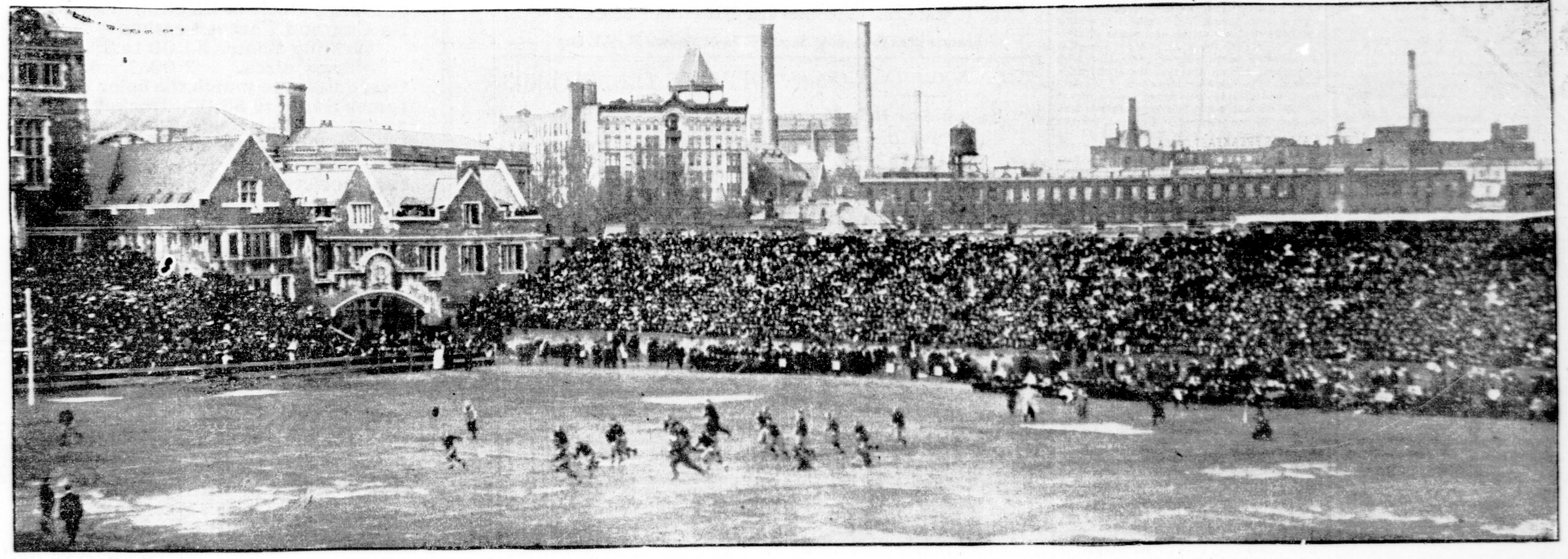
Part of the crowd watching Pennsylvania defeat Cornell on Franklin Field, Philadelphia

== Schedule ==
Date	Opponent	Site	Result	Attendance	Source
September 29	North Carolina	Franklin Field; Philadelphia, PA	W 37–0		
October 2	Villanova	Franklin Field; Philadelphia, PA	W 16–0		
October 5	Bucknell	Franklin Field; Philadelphia, PA	W 29–2		
October 9	Franklin & Marshall	Franklin Field; Philadelphia, PA	W 57–0		
October 12	Swarthmore	Franklin Field; Philadelphia, PA	W 16–8		
October 16	Gettysburg	Franklin Field; Philadelphia, PA	W 23–0		
October 19	Brown	Franklin Field; Philadelphia, PA	W 11–0		
October 26	Carlisle	Franklin Field; Philadelphia, PA	L 6–26		
November 2	Lafayette	Franklin Field; Philadelphia, PA	W 15–0		
November 9	Penn State	Franklin Field; Philadelphia, PA	W 28–0		
November 16	at Michigan	Ferry Field; Ann Arbor, MI	W 6–0	19,500	
November 28	Cornell	Franklin Field; Philadelphia, PA (rivalry)	W 12–4		
