= Cody Clark (American football) =

American football player and coach (1882–1931)

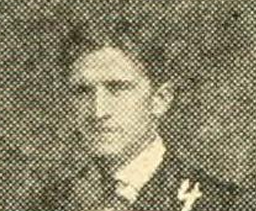
- Clark pictured in the 1907 Marquette football team photo

Biographical details
- Born: August 13, 1882; Wisconsin, U.S.
- Died: November 14, 1931 (aged 49); Alliance, Nebraska, U.S.

Playing career
- 1903–1904: Wisconsin
- 1906: Wisconsin
- Position(s): Halfback

Coaching career (HC unless noted)
- 1907: Marquette

Head coaching record
- Overall: 6–0

Floyd Milton "Cody" Clark (August 13, 1882 – November 14, 1931) was an American college football player and coach. Clark was the sixth head football coach at Marquette University in Milwaukee and he held that position for the 1907 season. His coaching record at Marquette was 6–0.

Clark died at a hospital in Alliance, Nebraska after a long illness in 1931.

== Head coaching record ==
Year	Team	Overall	Conference	Standing	Bowl/playoffs
Marquette Blue and Gold (Independent) (1907)
1907	Marquette	6–0			
Marquette:		6–0			
Total:		6–0			
