= 1907 Miami Redskins football team =

American college football season

1907 Miami Redskins football
- Conference: Independent
- Record: 6–1
- Head coach: Amos Foster (1st season)
- Captain: Booth
- Home stadium: Miami Field

1907 Midwestern college football independents records
	Conf.			Overall
Team	W	L	T	W		L		T
Marquette		–		6	–	0	–	0
North Dakota Agricultural		–		3	–	0	–	0
Lincoln (MO)		–		1	–	0	–	0
Notre Dame		–		6	–	0	–	1
Miami (OH)		–		6	–	1	–	0
Michigan		–		5	–	1	–	0
Mount Union		–		9	–	2	–	0
Fairmount		–		8	–	2	–	0
Iowa State		–		6	–	2	–	0
Lake Forest		–		4	–	1	–	1
South Dakota State		–		5	–	2	–	0
St. Vincent's (IL)		–		5	–	2	–	0
Wabash		–		5	–	2	–	0
Saint Louis		–		7	–	3	–	0
Western State Normal		–		4	–	2	–	1
Kansas State		–		5	–	3	–	0
Michigan State Normal		–		3	–	2	–	0
Wittenberg		–		5	–	4	–	0
Central Michigan		–		3	–	3	–	0
Drake		–		3	–	4	–	1
Ohio		–		3	–	4	–	1
Western Illinois		–		2	–	3	–	0
Franklin		–		3	–	5	–	1
Heidelberg		–		2	–	4	–	1
Butler		–		1	–	3	–	2
Carthage		–		2	–	5	–	0
Haskell		–		2	–	6	–	1
Chicago P&S		–		1	–	3	–	0
Detroit College		–		1	–	3	–	0
Northern Illinois State		–		1	–	4	–	1
Doane		–		1	–	5	–	0
St. Mary's (OH)		–		0	–	4	–	0
Baldwin–Wallace		–		0	–	6	–	0

The 1907 Miami Redskins football team was an American football team that represented Miami University during the 1907 college football season. Led by coach Amos Foster in his first year, Miami compiled a 6–1 record, shutting out four opponents and outscoring them 120 to 37.

== Schedule ==
Date	Time	Opponent	Site	Result	Source
October 5		Antioch	Miami Field; Oxford, OH	W 38–0 (Note: College Football Data Warehouse lists 43–0.)	
October 12		at Earlham	Richmond, IN	W 0–11	
October 19		at DePauw	Greencastle, IN	L 6–17	
October 26	3:00 p.m.	vs. Centre	High School Park Field; Louisville, KY	W 10–0	
November 9		Otterbein	Miami Field; Oxford, OH	W 32–0	
November 16		at Marietta	Marietta, OH	W 12–10	
November 28		at Cincinnati Gym AC	Cincinnati, OH	W 6–0	

== Roster ==
1907 Miami Redskins roster
Quarterbacks: Ahiter; Halfbacks: Custenborder; McCoy	Fullbacks: Ruppert; Ends: Morris; Radcliff	Guards: Brower; Jehbson; Tackles: Rymer; Brown; Centers: Booth (Captain)	Head coach: Amos Foster; Rookies in italics

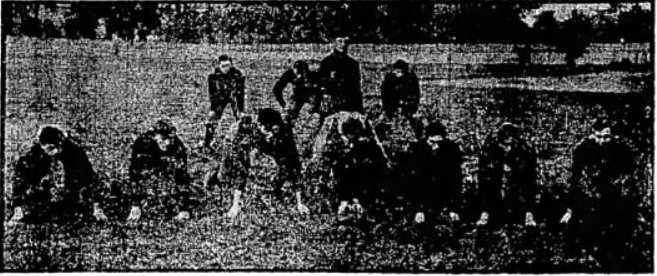
