= Walter D. Graham =

American football player (1885–1927)

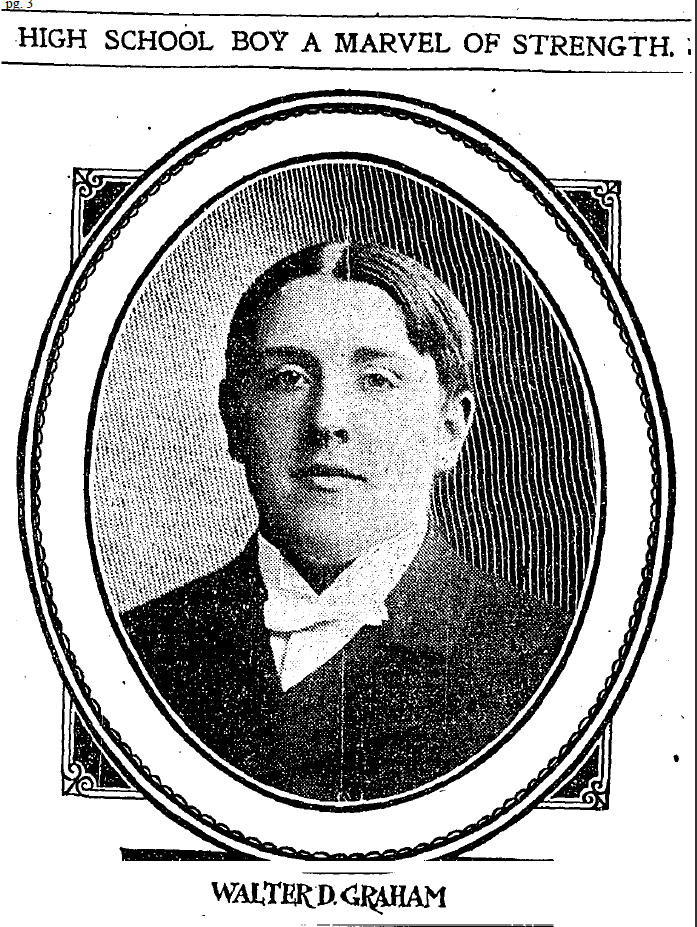
- Walter D. Graham, Chicago Daily Tribune, October 26, 1901
- Born: January 23, 1885; Illinois, U.S.
- Died: July 14, 1927 (aged 42); River Forest, Illinois, U.S.
- Education: University of Michigan
- Known for: Football player

Walter DeWitt "Octy" Graham (January 23, 1885 – July 14, 1927) was an American football player. He played for the University of Michigan from 1904 to 1907 and was one of the leading players on the famed "Point-a-Minute" teams of 1904 and 1905.

== Early years ==
A native of Chicago, Graham attended the English High and Manual Training School and the North Division High School. In 1901, the Chicago Daily Tribune reported that a "young Hercules" had been discovered in a Chicago high school:

"HIGH SCHOOL BOY A MARVEL OF STRENGTH.
Walter D. Graham is the young Hercules in strength discovered among the Chicago high school boys who aspire to become heroes of the gridiron. ... Medical inspectors of the Board of Education had been making physical examinations of ambitious punters to see whether their constitutions were rugged enough to withstand the vigorous tactics of football. After over a hundred applicants had been put through a series of tests the examiners were astonished to be confronted, who gave his age as 16 years and his weight at 218 pounds. In normal condition his chest measure is 41½ inches, and in expansion he stretches the tape to 44 inches. His height is 5 feet 6 inches. His flesh and muscles are as solid as bands of steel. The gripping machines did not register high enough to show his strength. ... It is unnecessary to add that Graham was declared fit to stand any hardship known on the gridiron."

Despite his size, Graham also won honors as a hurdler while in high school.

== University of Michigan ==
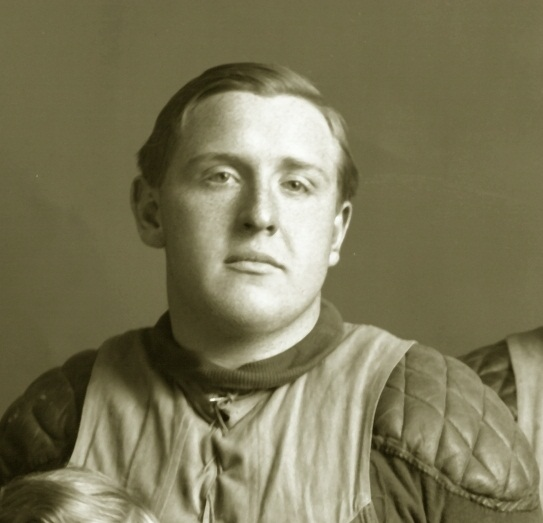
Graham as a freshman at Michigan, 1904

After graduating from high school, Graham enrolled at the University of Michigan. He played at the guard and tackle positions for the Michigan Wolverines football from 1904 to 1907. He was known by the nickname "Octy" due to his having a long reach like an octopus. After he scored three touchdowns in a 1905 game, the Chicago Daily Tribune wrote:

"'Octy' Graham was allowed to carry the ball and he scored three touchdowns. Moreover he carried the ball repeatedly on sprints in which he broke away from the entire field for several yards. At other times he was down under punts like a shot out of a gun. The cheering for 'Octy' was prolonged: 'Rah for Octy, Michigan's Eckersall'"

Graham also handled kicking duties for Michigan. As a senior in 1907, he kicked two field goals for Michigan's only points in an 8–0 win over Vanderbilt. (Field goals counted for four points under 1907 rules.) After the victory over Vanderbilt, The Washington Post called Graham "a tenth of a ton Wolverine star" who "wins games for Michigan and saves his team from defeat."

The New York Times later called Graham "one of Michigan's greatest football stars of Yost's famous 'point a minute' eleven."

== Family and later years ==
Graham was married in October 1911 to Emma Lutilla Freaser at the La Salle Hotel; they took their honeymoon trip to Cuba and Mexico. They had two children, Walter D. Graham Jr., and Virginia Graham. In his draft registration submitted in 1918, Graham stated that he was a resident of Chicago and the President of the Mutual Cigar Co.

Graham's first wife died in 1920, and in April 1921, Graham married Hazel Cady Chatterton of River Forest, Illinois. The couple announced their plans to live in Kenilworth. They had four children, Walter D. Graham Jr., William Graham, Virginia Graham, and Jeanne Graham. Graham lived in River Forest in his later years. After developing a brain tumor, he underwent surgery at Chicago's Wesley Memorial Hospital in late May 1927. He showed signs of improvement in the days after the surgery, but he died at his home in River Forest less than two months later.
