= 1907 Chicago Physicians and Surgeons football team =

American college football season

1907 Chicago Physicians and Surgeons football
- Conference: Independent
- Record: 1–3

1907 Midwestern college football independents records
	Conf.			Overall
Team	W	L	T	W		L		T
Marquette		–		6	–	0	–	0
North Dakota Agricultural		–		3	–	0	–	0
Lincoln (MO)		–		1	–	0	–	0
Notre Dame		–		6	–	0	–	1
Miami (OH)		–		6	–	1	–	0
Michigan		–		5	–	1	–	0
Mount Union		–		9	–	2	–	0
Fairmount		–		8	–	2	–	0
Iowa State		–		6	–	2	–	0
Lake Forest		–		4	–	1	–	1
South Dakota State		–		5	–	2	–	0
St. Vincent's (IL)		–		5	–	2	–	0
Wabash		–		5	–	2	–	0
Saint Louis		–		7	–	3	–	0
Western State Normal		–		4	–	2	–	1
Kansas State		–		5	–	3	–	0
Michigan State Normal		–		3	–	2	–	0
Wittenberg		–		5	–	4	–	0
Central Michigan		–		3	–	3	–	0
Drake		–		3	–	4	–	1
Ohio		–		3	–	4	–	1
Western Illinois		–		2	–	3	–	0
Franklin		–		3	–	5	–	1
Heidelberg		–		2	–	4	–	1
Butler		–		1	–	3	–	2
Carthage		–		2	–	5	–	0
Haskell		–		2	–	6	–	1
Chicago P&S		–		1	–	3	–	0
Detroit College		–		1	–	3	–	0
Northern Illinois State		–		1	–	4	–	1
Doane		–		1	–	5	–	0
St. Mary's (OH)		–		0	–	4	–	0
Baldwin–Wallace		–		0	–	6	–	0

The 1907 Chicago Physicians and Surgeons football team represented the College of Physicians and Surgeons of Chicago during the 1907 college football season.

== Schedule ==
Date	Opponent	Site	Result	Source
October 12	Notre Dame	Cartier Field; Notre Dame, IN	L 0–32	
November 2	Northwestern Medical School	Northwestern Field; Evanston, IL	W 11–6	
November 16	St. Vincent's (IL)	St. Vincent's grounds; Chicago, IL	L 0–45	
Before November 22	Shurtleff		L 0–10	

- It's possible that the contest against Shurtleff was referring to another Physicians and Surgeons college separate from Chicago's P&S team.
