= Harry M. Towne =

American football player and coach

Biographical details
- Born: August 25, 1877; Alfred, Maine, U.S.
- Died: March 6, 1952 (aged 74); East Cleveland, Ohio, U.S.

Playing career

Baseball
- 1899–1900: Bates
- 1901: Lewiston
- 1901: Lowell Tigers
- 1902: Dover

Football
- 1899–1902: Bates
- Positions: Pitcher (baseball); Halfback (football)

Coaching career (HC unless noted)

Football
- 1905–1906: Culver Military Academy
- 1907–1909: Knox (IL)
- 1910–1918: Glenville HS (OH)

Basketball
- 1907–1910: Knox (IL)
- 1910–1919: Glenville HS (OH)

Baseball
- 1908–1910: Knox (IL)

Head coaching record
- Overall: 4–17–4 (college football); 21–16 (college basketball); 26–27 (college baseball)

Harry Merritt Towne (August 25, 1877 – March 6, 1952) was an American athlete and coach who played baseball and football at Bates College and coached football, men's basketball, and baseball at Knox College.

== Athletics ==
Towne was born on August 25, 1877 in Alfred, Maine to Marcus W. and Annie (Wyman) Towne. He graduated from Buxton High School in 1896 and Bridgton Academy in 1898. At Bridgton, Towne played halfback on the football team and catcher on the baseball team. During his freshman year at Bates, coach Swipes Emery made him the team's starting pitcher despite never playing the position before. He won five of his seven starts, including a victory over Brown. The following season, he shut out Columbia and struck out 13 batters in a game against Bowdoin. He then played in the New England League for Lewiston (1901), Lowell (1901), and Dover (1902). Towne played four seasons of football at Bates and was captain during his senior (1902) season.

== Coaching and educating ==
Towne graduated from Bates in 1903 and was appointed vice principal of the Bridgton Academy. However, before the school year began, he accepted a position at the Oxford School in Chicago. In 1905, he became the director of athletics and an instructor in mathematics at the Culver Military Academy. From 1907 to 1910, he was the athletics coach at Knox College. He compiled a 4–17–4 record in football, a 21–16 record in men's basketball, and a 26–27 record in baseball. In 1910, he became the coach and physical director at Glenville High School in Cleveland. He then served as the school's assistant principal from 1919 until his retirement in 1947. He died of a heart attack at his home in East Cleveland, Ohio on March 6, 1952.
