= 1907 North Dakota Agricultural Aggies football team =

American college football season

1907 North Dakota Agricultural Aggies football
- Conference: Independent
- Record: 3–0
- Head coach: Gil Dobie (2nd season)
- Captain: Pete Tierney

1907 Midwestern college football independents records
	Conf.			Overall
Team	W	L	T	W		L		T
Marquette		–		6	–	0	–	0
North Dakota Agricultural		–		3	–	0	–	0
Lincoln (MO)		–		1	–	0	–	0
Notre Dame		–		6	–	0	–	1
Miami (OH)		–		6	–	1	–	0
Michigan		–		5	–	1	–	0
Mount Union		–		9	–	2	–	0
Fairmount		–		8	–	2	–	0
Iowa State		–		6	–	2	–	0
Lake Forest		–		4	–	1	–	1
South Dakota State		–		5	–	2	–	0
St. Vincent's (IL)		–		5	–	2	–	0
Wabash		–		5	–	2	–	0
Saint Louis		–		7	–	3	–	0
Western State Normal		–		4	–	2	–	1
Kansas State		–		5	–	3	–	0
Michigan State Normal		–		3	–	2	–	0
Wittenberg		–		5	–	4	–	0
Central Michigan		–		3	–	3	–	0
Drake		–		3	–	4	–	1
Ohio		–		3	–	4	–	1
Western Illinois		–		2	–	3	–	0
Franklin		–		3	–	5	–	1
Heidelberg		–		2	–	4	–	1
Butler		–		1	–	3	–	2
Carthage		–		2	–	5	–	0
Haskell		–		2	–	6	–	1
Chicago P&S		–		1	–	3	–	0
Detroit College		–		1	–	3	–	0
Northern Illinois State		–		1	–	4	–	1
Doane		–		1	–	5	–	0
St. Mary's (OH)		–		0	–	4	–	0
Baldwin–Wallace		–		0	–	6	–	0

The 1907 North Dakota Agricultural Aggies football team was an American football team that represented North Dakota Agricultural College (now known as North Dakota State University) as an independent during the 1907 college football season. In its second and final season under head coach Gil Dobie, the team compiled a 3–0 record and outscored opponents by a total of 164 to 10. The team's Mascot origin dates back to 1922, however, it officially got its name "Thundar" in the year 1991.

The season was part of a 10-game winning streak that began in 1905 and ended in 1908.

== Schedule ==
Date	Opponent	Site	Result
October 21	at Lawrence	Appleton, WI	W 45–4
November 2	at South Dakota	Vermillion, SD	W 55–0
November 9	Haskell	Fargo, ND	W 64–6
