= 1907 Haskell Indians football team =

American college football season

1907 Haskell Indians football
- Conference: Independent
- Record: 2–6–1
- Head coach: Bemus Pierce (1st season)

1907 Midwestern college football independents records
	Conf.			Overall
Team	W	L	T	W		L		T
Marquette		–		6	–	0	–	0
North Dakota Agricultural		–		3	–	0	–	0
Lincoln (MO)		–		1	–	0	–	0
Notre Dame		–		6	–	0	–	1
Miami (OH)		–		6	–	1	–	0
Michigan		–		5	–	1	–	0
Mount Union		–		9	–	2	–	0
Fairmount		–		8	–	2	–	0
Iowa State		–		6	–	2	–	0
Lake Forest		–		4	–	1	–	1
South Dakota State		–		5	–	2	–	0
St. Vincent's (IL)		–		5	–	2	–	0
Wabash		–		5	–	2	–	0
Saint Louis		–		7	–	3	–	0
Western State Normal		–		4	–	2	–	1
Kansas State		–		5	–	3	–	0
Michigan State Normal		–		3	–	2	–	0
Wittenberg		–		5	–	4	–	0
Central Michigan		–		3	–	3	–	0
Drake		–		3	–	4	–	1
Ohio		–		3	–	4	–	1
Western Illinois		–		2	–	3	–	0
Franklin		–		3	–	5	–	1
Heidelberg		–		2	–	4	–	1
Butler		–		1	–	3	–	2
Carthage		–		2	–	5	–	0
Haskell		–		2	–	6	–	1
Chicago P&S		–		1	–	3	–	0
Detroit College		–		1	–	3	–	0
Northern Illinois State		–		1	–	4	–	1
Doane		–		1	–	5	–	0
St. Mary's (OH)		–		0	–	4	–	0
Baldwin–Wallace		–		0	–	6	–	0

The 1907 Haskell Indians football team was an American football team that represented the Haskell Indian Institute (now known as Haskell Indian Nations University) as an independent during the 1907 college football season. In its first and only season under head coach Bemus Pierce, Haskell compiled a 2–6–1 record and was outscored by a total of 167 to 38.

== Schedule ==
Date	Opponent	Site	Result	Source
September 28	at Arkansas	The Hill; Fayetteville, AR	T 0–0	
October 8	William Jewell	Lawrence, KS	W 6–0	
October 12	at Kansas State	Manhattan, KS	W 10–0	
October 19	at Washburn	Topeka, KS	L 0–33	
October 25	at Texas	Clark Field; Austin, TX	L 10–45	
October 28	at Texas A&M	College Station, TX	L 0–5	
November 9	at North Dakota Agricultural	Fargo, ND	L 6–64	
November 16	at Marquette	Milwaukee, WI	L 0–11	
November 28	at Creighton	Omaha, NE	L 6–9	
