= 1907 Western State Normal Hilltoppers football team =

American college football season

1907 Western State Normal Hilltoppers football
- Conference: Independent
- Record: 4–2–1
- Head coach: William H. Spaulding (1st season)
- Captain: Tubby Meyers

1907 Midwestern college football independents records
	Conf.			Overall
Team	W	L	T	W		L		T
Marquette		–		6	–	0	–	0
North Dakota Agricultural		–		3	–	0	–	0
Lincoln (MO)		–		1	–	0	–	0
Notre Dame		–		6	–	0	–	1
Miami (OH)		–		6	–	1	–	0
Michigan		–		5	–	1	–	0
Mount Union		–		9	–	2	–	0
Fairmount		–		8	–	2	–	0
Iowa State		–		6	–	2	–	0
Lake Forest		–		4	–	1	–	1
South Dakota State		–		5	–	2	–	0
St. Vincent's (IL)		–		5	–	2	–	0
Wabash		–		5	–	2	–	0
Saint Louis		–		7	–	3	–	0
Western State Normal		–		4	–	2	–	1
Kansas State		–		5	–	3	–	0
Michigan State Normal		–		3	–	2	–	0
Wittenberg		–		5	–	4	–	0
Central Michigan		–		3	–	3	–	0
Drake		–		3	–	4	–	1
Ohio		–		3	–	4	–	1
Western Illinois		–		2	–	3	–	0
Franklin		–		3	–	5	–	1
Heidelberg		–		2	–	4	–	1
Butler		–		1	–	3	–	2
Carthage		–		2	–	5	–	0
Haskell		–		2	–	6	–	1
Chicago P&S		–		1	–	3	–	0
Detroit College		–		1	–	3	–	0
Northern Illinois State		–		1	–	4	–	1
Doane		–		1	–	5	–	0
St. Mary's (OH)		–		0	–	4	–	0
Baldwin–Wallace		–		0	–	6	–	0

The 1907 Western State Normal Hilltoppers football team represented Western State Normal School (later renamed Western Michigan University) as an independent during the 1907 college football season. In their first season under head coach William H. Spaulding, the Hilltoppers compiled a 4–2–1 record and shut out five of seven opponents.

After losing to Albion (5–0) and Olivet (3–0), the team did not allow a point to be scored by its opponents in the final four games against Central Michigan (29–0), Ferris Institute (0–0), Michigan State Normal (6–0), and Kalamazoo (40–0).

Halfback Tubby Meyers was the team captain for the second of three consecutive years.

The 1907 season marked the beginning of a 15-year tenure by Spaulding as the school's head football coach. Spalding had played college football at Wabash College in 1906. He coached the Western State football team from 1907 to 1921, compiling a 62–25–3 record, and later served as head football coach at Minnesota (1922–1924) and UCLA (1925–1938).

== Schedule ==
Date	Time	Opponent	Site	Result	Source
October 5		Grand Rapids High School		W 9–0	
October 9		at Albion	Albion, MI	L 0–5	
October 12		at Olivet	Olivet, MI	L 0–43	
October 19		at Central Michigan	Mount Pleasant, MI (rivalry)	W 27–0	
November 2		at Ferris Institute	Big Rapids, MI	T 0–0	
November 9		Michigan State Normal	Kalamazoo, MI	W 6–0	
November 15	3:00 p.m.	Kalamazoo	Woodward Avenue grounds; Kalamazoo, MI	W 40–0	
