= 1907 Drake Bulldogs football team =

American college football season

1907 Drake Bulldogs football
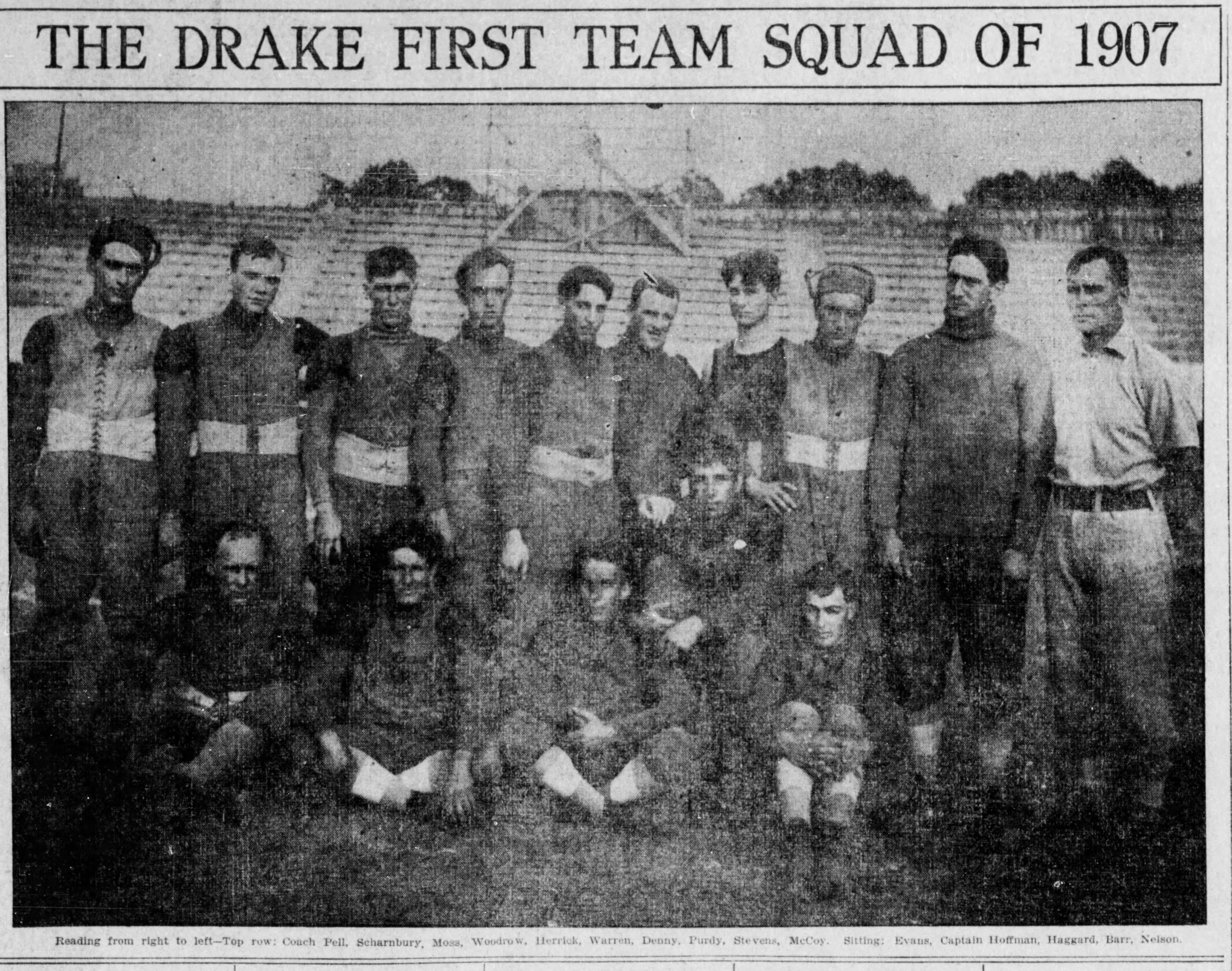
- Conference: Independent
- Record: 3–4–1
- Head coach: Charles Pell (2nd season)
- Home stadium: Haskins Field

1907 Midwestern college football independents records
	Conf.			Overall
Team	W	L	T	W		L		T
Marquette		–		6	–	0	–	0
North Dakota Agricultural		–		3	–	0	–	0
Lincoln (MO)		–		1	–	0	–	0
Notre Dame		–		6	–	0	–	1
Miami (OH)		–		6	–	1	–	0
Michigan		–		5	–	1	–	0
Mount Union		–		9	–	2	–	0
Fairmount		–		8	–	2	–	0
Iowa State		–		6	–	2	–	0
Lake Forest		–		4	–	1	–	1
South Dakota State		–		5	–	2	–	0
St. Vincent's (IL)		–		5	–	2	–	0
Wabash		–		5	–	2	–	0
Saint Louis		–		7	–	3	–	0
Western State Normal		–		4	–	2	–	1
Kansas State		–		5	–	3	–	0
Michigan State Normal		–		3	–	2	–	0
Wittenberg		–		5	–	4	–	0
Central Michigan		–		3	–	3	–	0
Drake		–		3	–	4	–	1
Ohio		–		3	–	4	–	1
Western Illinois		–		2	–	3	–	0
Franklin		–		3	–	5	–	1
Heidelberg		–		2	–	4	–	1
Butler		–		1	–	3	–	2
Carthage		–		2	–	5	–	0
Haskell		–		2	–	6	–	1
Chicago P&S		–		1	–	3	–	0
Detroit College		–		1	–	3	–	0
Northern Illinois State		–		1	–	4	–	1
Doane		–		1	–	5	–	0
St. Mary's (OH)		–		0	–	4	–	0
Baldwin–Wallace		–		0	–	6	–	0

The 1907 Drake Bulldogs football team was an American football team that represented Drake University as an independent during the 1907 college football season. In their second and final season under head coach Charles Pell, the Bulldogs compiled a 3–4–1 record and were outscored by a total of 74 to 61.

The team played its home games at Haskins Field in Des Moines, Iowa.

== Schedule ==
Date	Opponent	Site	Result	Source
September 28	at Grinnell	Grinnell, IA	W 6–0	
October 5	at Morningside	Bass Field; Sioux City, IA	W 6–5	
October 12	Drake alumni	Haskins Field; Des Moines, IA	T 0–0	
October 19	Coe	Haskins Field; Des Moines, IA	W 26–0	
October 26	Iowa	Haskins Field; Des Moines, IA	L 4–25	
November 2	Grinnell	Haskins Field; Des Moines, IA	L 0–10	
November 9	at Creighton	Omaha, NE	L 11–21	
November 16	Buena Vista		Cancelled	
November 28	Iowa State	Haskins Field; Des Moines, IA	L 8–13	
