= Wilbur M. Cunningham =

American lawyer

Biographical details
- Born: February 4, 1886; Benton Harbor, Michigan, U.S.
- Died: January 14, 1974 (aged 87); Benton Harbor, Michigan, U.S.

Playing career
- 1907–1910: Michigan

Coaching career (HC unless noted)
- 1912: Kentucky University

Head coaching record
- Overall: 0–7

Wilbur Morrill Cunningham (February 4, 1886 – January 14, 1974) was an American college football player and coach, attorney, historian and author.

== Early years ==
Cunningham was born in 1886 in Benton Harbor, Michigan. His father, George Cunningham, was a New York native and an insurance agent.

Cunningham attended the University of Michigan where he studied law played college football for Fielding H. Yost's Michigan Wolverines football teams from 1907 to 1910. He graduated from Michigan's Law Department as part of its Class of 1912.

During the fall of 1912, he served as the head coach of the Kentucky University football team.

== Later years ==
After completing his legal education, Cunningham opened a law practice in his hometown of Benton Harbor, Michigan. When the United States entered World War I in April 1917, Cunningham closed his legal practice and began serving on active duty in the United States Navy. He served with the rank of lieutenant in the paymaster's department and aboard the USS Massachusetts. Upon his discharge from the Navy in 1919, he returned to Benton Harbor and resumed his law practice. He served two terms as prosecuting attorney for Berrien County from 1929 to 1933 and for 23 years from 1933 to 1956 as the city attorney of Benton Harbor, Michigan.

Cunningham was also a noted historian, author and archeologist specializing in Native American artifacts. In 1961, he published "Land of Four Flags: An Early History of the St. Joseph Valley," a history of southwestern Michigan.

Cunningham died in 1974 at age 89 and was buried at the Crystal Springs Cemetery in Benton Harbor, Michigan.

== Head coaching record ==
Year	Team	Overall	Conference	Standing	Bowl/playoffs
Transylvania Crimsons (Independent) (1912)
1912	Transylvania	0–7			
Transylvania:		0–7			
Total:		0–7			
