= 1907 Iowa State Cyclones football team =

American college football season

1907 Iowa State Cyclones football
- Conference: Independent
- Record: 6–2
- Head coach: Clyde Williams (1st season)
- Captain: Ralph McElhinney
- Home stadium: State Field

1907 Midwestern college football independents records
	Conf.			Overall
Team	W	L	T	W		L		T
Marquette		–		6	–	0	–	0
North Dakota Agricultural		–		3	–	0	–	0
Lincoln (MO)		–		1	–	0	–	0
Notre Dame		–		6	–	0	–	1
Miami (OH)		–		6	–	1	–	0
Michigan		–		5	–	1	–	0
Mount Union		–		9	–	2	–	0
Fairmount		–		8	–	2	–	0
Iowa State		–		6	–	2	–	0
Lake Forest		–		4	–	1	–	1
South Dakota State		–		5	–	2	–	0
St. Vincent's (IL)		–		5	–	2	–	0
Wabash		–		5	–	2	–	0
Saint Louis		–		7	–	3	–	0
Western State Normal		–		4	–	2	–	1
Kansas State		–		5	–	3	–	0
Michigan State Normal		–		3	–	2	–	0
Wittenberg		–		5	–	4	–	0
Central Michigan		–		3	–	3	–	0
Drake		–		3	–	4	–	1
Ohio		–		3	–	4	–	1
Western Illinois		–		2	–	3	–	0
Franklin		–		3	–	5	–	1
Heidelberg		–		2	–	4	–	1
Butler		–		1	–	3	–	2
Carthage		–		2	–	5	–	0
Haskell		–		2	–	6	–	1
Chicago P&S		–		1	–	3	–	0
Detroit College		–		1	–	3	–	0
Northern Illinois State		–		1	–	4	–	1
Doane		–		1	–	5	–	0
St. Mary's (OH)		–		0	–	4	–	0
Baldwin–Wallace		–		0	–	6	–	0

The 1907 Iowa State Cyclones football team represented Iowa State College of Agricultural and Mechanic Arts (later renamed Iowa State University) as an independent during the 1907 college football season. In their first season under head coach Clyde Williams, the Cyclones compiled a 6–2 record, shut out four of eight opponents, and outscored all opponents by a combined total of 138 to 40. Ralph McElhinney was the team captain.

Between 1892 and 1913, the football team played on a field that later became the site of the university's Parks Library. The field was known as State Field; when the new field opened in 1914, it became known as "New State Field".

== Schedule ==
Date	Opponent	Site	Result	Attendance	Source
October 4	Coe	State Field; Ames, IA	W 18–0		
October 12	at Minnesota	Northrop Field; Minneapolis, MN	L 0–8	5,000	
October 19	at Morningside	Sioux City, IA	W 12–0		
October 26	Cornell (IA)	State Field; Ames, IA	W 17–0		
November 2	at Nebraska	Antelope Field; Lincoln, NE (rivalry)	L 9–10		
November 9	at Grinnell	Grinnell, IA	W 49–0		
November 23	Iowa	State Field; Ames, IA (rivalry)	W 20–14		
November 28	at Drake	Haskins Field; Des Moines, IA	W 13–8		
