= 1907 Fairmount Wheatshockers football team =

American college football season

1907 Fairmount Wheatshockers football
- Conference: Independent
- Record: 8–2
- Head coach: Willis Bates (3rd season)

1907 Midwestern college football independents records
	Conf.			Overall
Team	W	L	T	W		L		T
Marquette		–		6	–	0	–	0
North Dakota Agricultural		–		3	–	0	–	0
Lincoln (MO)		–		1	–	0	–	0
Notre Dame		–		6	–	0	–	1
Miami (OH)		–		6	–	1	–	0
Michigan		–		5	–	1	–	0
Mount Union		–		9	–	2	–	0
Fairmount		–		8	–	2	–	0
Iowa State		–		6	–	2	–	0
Lake Forest		–		4	–	1	–	1
South Dakota State		–		5	–	2	–	0
St. Vincent's (IL)		–		5	–	2	–	0
Wabash		–		5	–	2	–	0
Saint Louis		–		7	–	3	–	0
Western State Normal		–		4	–	2	–	1
Kansas State		–		5	–	3	–	0
Michigan State Normal		–		3	–	2	–	0
Wittenberg		–		5	–	4	–	0
Central Michigan		–		3	–	3	–	0
Drake		–		3	–	4	–	1
Ohio		–		3	–	4	–	1
Western Illinois		–		2	–	3	–	0
Franklin		–		3	–	5	–	1
Heidelberg		–		2	–	4	–	1
Butler		–		1	–	3	–	2
Carthage		–		2	–	5	–	0
Haskell		–		2	–	6	–	1
Chicago P&S		–		1	–	3	–	0
Detroit College		–		1	–	3	–	0
Northern Illinois State		–		1	–	4	–	1
Doane		–		1	–	5	–	0
St. Mary's (OH)		–		0	–	4	–	0
Baldwin–Wallace		–		0	–	6	–	0

The 1907 Fairmount Wheatshockers football team was an American football team that represented Fairmount College (now known as Wichita State University) as an independent during the 1907 college football season. In its third season under head coach Willis Bates, the team compiled an 8–2 record, shut out six of ten opponents, and outscored all opponents by a total of 296 to 44.

On November 11, 1907, the team tallied the largest point total in school history, defeating the team from the newly formed Oklahoma Christian University by a score of 111 to 0. In a game lasting only 45 minutes (25-minute first half and 20-minute second half), the Wheatshockers averaged 2.5 points per minute.

== Schedule ==
Date	Opponent	Site	Result	Attendance	Source
September 27	Kansas State Normal	Fairmount Athletic Field; Wichita, KS	W 5–0		
October 5	at Salt City Business College	Hutchinson, KS	W 41–0		
October 14	Cooper	Fairmount Athletic Field; Wichita, KS	W 6–0		
October 26	Alva Normal	Fairmount Athletic Field; Wichita, KS	W 51–0		
November 2	at Kansas Wesleyan	Salina, KS	W 42–0		
November 4	at Saint Mary's (KS)	St. Marys, KS	W 16–11		
November 11	Oklahoma Christian	Fairmount Athletic Field; Wichita, KS	W 111–0		
November 16	at Washburn	Topeka, KS	L 0–12	1,500	
November 18	at Kansas State	Manhattan, KS	L 6–10		
November 28	Southern Kansas	New fair grounds; Wichita, KS	W 18–11	1,200	
