= Harry S. Hammond =

American football player and businessman (1884–1960)

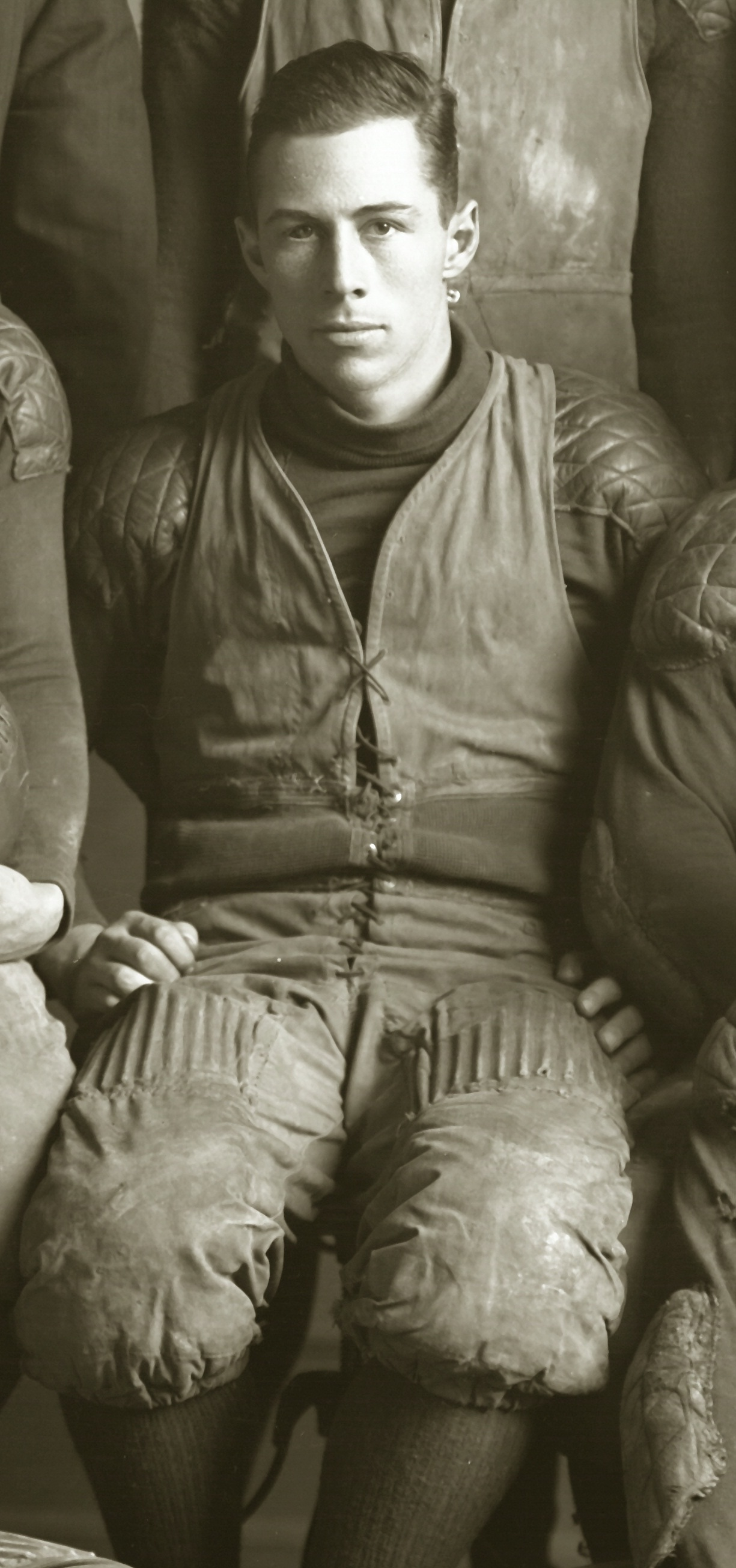
- Hammond cropped from 1907 Michigan football team portrait

Profile
- Positions: End, Halfback

Personal information
- Born: November 13, 1884; Crown Point, New York, U.S.
- Died: June 9, 1960 (aged 75); Westport, Connecticut, U.S.
- Listed height: 6 ft 0 in (1.83 m)
- Listed weight: 180 lb (82 kg)

Career information
- College: Michigan

Career history
- 1904–1907: Michigan

Awards and highlights
- National champion (1904); First-team All-Western (1907)

Harry Stevens Hammond (November 13, 1884 – June 9, 1960) was an American football player and businessman. He played college football at the University of Michigan from 1904 to 1907. He later had a career in business with the Pressed Steel Car Company and the National Tube Co.

== Early life ==
Hammond was born in Crown Point, New York in November 1884. He came from a family that manufactured iron for generations at Crown Point. His grandfather was Brig. Gen. John Hammond, who served in the Union Army during the Civil War and later became a U.S. Congressman from New York. When the Hammond family's iron works began to suffer as a result of competition from Lake Superior iron ore, the family moved to Chicago. Hammond's father, Charles Lyman Hammond, was a New York native, a graduate of the United States Military Academy, and a real estate businessman. His mother, Mary Electa (Stevens) Hammond, was a Vermont native. At the time of the 1900 United States census, Hammond lived in Chicago with his parents, four brothers, John (born December 1880), Charles H. (born August 1882), Thomas S. (born October 1883), and Robert (born February 1889), and two servants. He attended the public schools in Chicago.

Hammond's four brothers each became amateur athletes. His older brother, John S. Hammond, was a track and field competitor and football player at the United States Military Academy and was the founder of the New York Rangers. Brother Thomas S. Hammond, also played football for Michigan. The other two brothers were Robert Hammond, who worked for the Whiting Corporation, and architect C. Herrick Hammond.

== University of Michigan ==
Hammond enrolled at the University of Michigan in 1903. He played on the All-Freshman football team in 1903 before joining the varsity team as a sophomore. He played for the Michigan Wolverines football team from 1904 to 1907 and was one of the leading scorers on the 1904 and 1905 "Point-a-Minute" football teams. He played at the halfback, fullback and end positions. The 1906 University of Michigan yearbook noted:

"No better exhibition of pluck was ever shown than his work in the Wisconsin game. Playing without a headgear, he dived headlong into the Badgers' interference time after time, breaking it up and enabling Tom to get the man with the ball. The manner in which he and Garrels outplayed the Chicago ends in the closing game was one of the redeeming feature [sic] of that contest. He repeatedly tackled the dreaded [Walter] Eckersall for losses or forced him to run out of bounds. While not a spectacular player, Hammond's courage and cool make him one of the most valuable players on the 1905 eleven."

Hammond was also a member of the Delta Kappa Epsilon fraternity at Michigan. Hammond graduated from the University of Michigan with a mechanical engineering degree in 1908.

== Later years and family ==
Hammond worked for several months after receiving his degree for the Kenwood Bridge Co. in Chicago. In 1908, he became associated with the Pressed Steel Car Co. of Pittsburgh. He worked for the latter company as a draftsman, estimator and sales agent at least into the 1920s. At the time of the 1910 United States census, he was living in Chicago with his parents and working as a sales agent for a steel car company.

Hammond married Helen Hoffstot at Port Washington, New York, in June 1917. At the time of the 1920 United States census, Hammond was living in Manhattan with his wife Helen and their son Harry S. Hammond, Jr. His occupation was listed as a salesman for pressed cars. In a draft registration card dated September 1918, Hammond indicated that he was a manager for the Pressed Steel Car Co. in Philadelphia. At the time of the 1930 United States census, Hammond was living in Garden City, New York with his wife Helen, their three children (Harry S. Hammond, Jr., Frank H. Hammond and Anne Hammond), and two servants. His occupation was listed as a sales agent for street cars.

During the 1930s, Hammond was associated with the gas industry business of National Tube Co., a subsidiary and later division of United States Steel Corp.

Hammond died in Westport, Connecticut in June 1960.
