= 1907 Saint Louis Blue and White football team =

American college football season

1907 Saint Louis Blue and White football
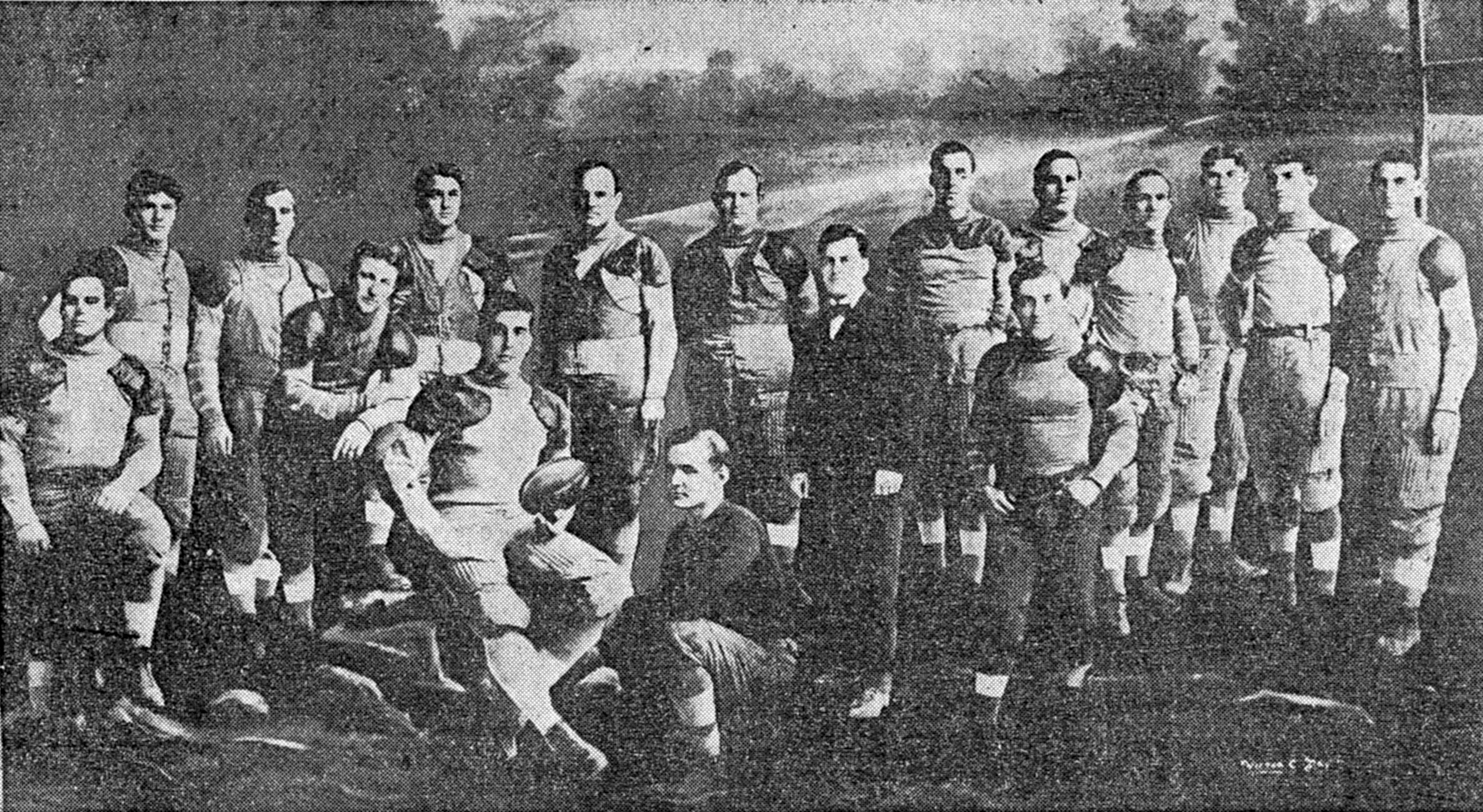
- Conference: Independent
- Record: 7–3
- Head coach: Eddie Cochems (2nd season)
- Home stadium: Handlan's Park, Sportsman's Park

1907 Midwestern college football independents records
	Conf.			Overall
Team	W	L	T	W		L		T
Marquette		–		6	–	0	–	0
North Dakota Agricultural		–		3	–	0	–	0
Lincoln (MO)		–		1	–	0	–	0
Notre Dame		–		6	–	0	–	1
Miami (OH)		–		6	–	1	–	0
Michigan		–		5	–	1	–	0
Mount Union		–		9	–	2	–	0
Fairmount		–		8	–	2	–	0
Iowa State		–		6	–	2	–	0
Lake Forest		–		4	–	1	–	1
South Dakota State		–		5	–	2	–	0
St. Vincent's (IL)		–		5	–	2	–	0
Wabash		–		5	–	2	–	0
Saint Louis		–		7	–	3	–	0
Western State Normal		–		4	–	2	–	1
Kansas State		–		5	–	3	–	0
Michigan State Normal		–		3	–	2	–	0
Wittenberg		–		5	–	4	–	0
Central Michigan		–		3	–	3	–	0
Drake		–		3	–	4	–	1
Ohio		–		3	–	4	–	1
Western Illinois		–		2	–	3	–	0
Franklin		–		3	–	5	–	1
Heidelberg		–		2	–	4	–	1
Butler		–		1	–	3	–	2
Carthage		–		2	–	5	–	0
Haskell		–		2	–	6	–	1
Chicago P&S		–		1	–	3	–	0
Detroit College		–		1	–	3	–	0
Northern Illinois State		–		1	–	4	–	1
Doane		–		1	–	5	–	0
St. Mary's (OH)		–		0	–	4	–	0
Baldwin–Wallace		–		0	–	6	–	0

The 1907 Saint Louis Blue and White football team was an American football team that represented Saint Louis University as an independent during the 1907 college football season. In its second season under head coach Eddie Cochems, the team compiled a 7–3 record and outscored opponents by a total of 298 to 40.

== Schedule ==
Date	Time	Opponent	Site	Result	Attendance	Source
October 5		Missouri Mines	Handlan's Park; St. Louis, MO	W 12–0	2,000	
October 12	3:00 p.m.	Cape Girardeau Normal	Handlan's Park; St. Louis, MO	W 58–0		
October 19	3:00 p.m.	Arkansas	Sportsman's Park; St. Louis, MO	W 42–6		
October 26	3:00 p.m.	Creighton	Sportsman's Park; St. Louis, MO	W 40–0		
November 2	2:30 p.m.	Washington University	Sportsman's Park; St. Louis, MO	W 78–0	6,000	
November 9		at Wabash	Crawfordsville, IN	L 11–12		
November 16		Kansas	Sportsman's Park; St. Louis, MO	W 17–0		
November 28		Nebraska	Sportsman's Park; St. Louis, MO	W 34–0		
December 25		vs. Washington State	Natatorium Park; Spokane, WA	L 0–11	3,000–5,000	
January 1	4:00 p.m.	at Multnomah Athletic Club	Multnomah Field; Portland, OR	L 6–11		
