= 1907 Michigan State Normal Normalites football team =

American college football season

1907 Michigan State Normal Normalites football
- Conference: Independent
- Record: 3–2
- Head coach: Henry Schulte (2nd season)
- Captain: Ashley P. Merrill

1907 Midwestern college football independents records
	Conf.			Overall
Team	W	L	T	W		L		T
Marquette		–		6	–	0	–	0
North Dakota Agricultural		–		3	–	0	–	0
Lincoln (MO)		–		1	–	0	–	0
Notre Dame		–		6	–	0	–	1
Miami (OH)		–		6	–	1	–	0
Michigan		–		5	–	1	–	0
Mount Union		–		9	–	2	–	0
Fairmount		–		8	–	2	–	0
Iowa State		–		6	–	2	–	0
Lake Forest		–		4	–	1	–	1
South Dakota State		–		5	–	2	–	0
St. Vincent's (IL)		–		5	–	2	–	0
Wabash		–		5	–	2	–	0
Saint Louis		–		7	–	3	–	0
Western State Normal		–		4	–	2	–	1
Kansas State		–		5	–	3	–	0
Michigan State Normal		–		3	–	2	–	0
Wittenberg		–		5	–	4	–	0
Central Michigan		–		3	–	3	–	0
Drake		–		3	–	4	–	1
Ohio		–		3	–	4	–	1
Western Illinois		–		2	–	3	–	0
Franklin		–		3	–	5	–	1
Heidelberg		–		2	–	4	–	1
Butler		–		1	–	3	–	2
Carthage		–		2	–	5	–	0
Haskell		–		2	–	6	–	1
Chicago P&S		–		1	–	3	–	0
Detroit College		–		1	–	3	–	0
Northern Illinois State		–		1	–	4	–	1
Doane		–		1	–	5	–	0
St. Mary's (OH)		–		0	–	4	–	0
Baldwin–Wallace		–		0	–	6	–	0

The 1907 Michigan State Normal Normalites football team represented Michigan State Normal College (later renamed Eastern Michigan University) as an independent during the 1907 college football season. In their second season under head coach Henry Schulte, the Normalites compiled a record of 3–2, shut out three of five opponents, and outscored their opponents by a combined total of 72 to 13. The team defeated Central Michigan Normal School (later renamed Central Michigan University), 38–0. Ashley P. Merrill was the team captain.

== Schedule ==
Date	Opponent	Site	Result	Source
October 12	Adrian	Ypsilanti, MI	W 22–0	
October 26	Detroit College	Ypsilanti, MI	W 7–0	
November 9	at Western State Normal	Kalamazoo, MI	L 0–6	
November 16	Central Michigan	Ypsilanti, MI (rivalry)	W 38–0	
November 23	at Hillsdale	Martin Field; Hillsdale, MI	L 4–7	
