= Billy Ryan =

American football player (1887–1951)

Personal information
- Born: April 21, 1887
- Died: December 20, 1951 (aged 64)

Career information
- College: Notre Dame (1909)

William Richard Ryan Jr. (April 21, 1887 – December 20, 1951) was an American football player from Cleveland, Ohio, and a starting quarterback for the University of Notre Dame.

Ryan began his career as the starting quarterback, placekicker and punt returner for the Notre Dame football squad in 1907, leading the team to an undefeated season of 6-0-1 in his freshman year.

Following his initial season, Ryan moved to right halfback where he had his best season as a junior in 1909, rushing for over 90 yards in a win over Michigan State, and scoring the winning touchdown in the team's first-ever victory over Michigan. A knee injury would sideline him for most of his senior season.

In addition to Ryan's skills on the gridiron, he was a pitcher for the baseball team, a basso in the campus Glee Club, and a lead actor in the university's theater productions.

Following graduation, he returned to his hometown of Cleveland, Ohio, where he married Louise Brotherton and worked in real estate.
