= 1907 St. Vincent's football team =

American college football season

1907 St. Vincent's football
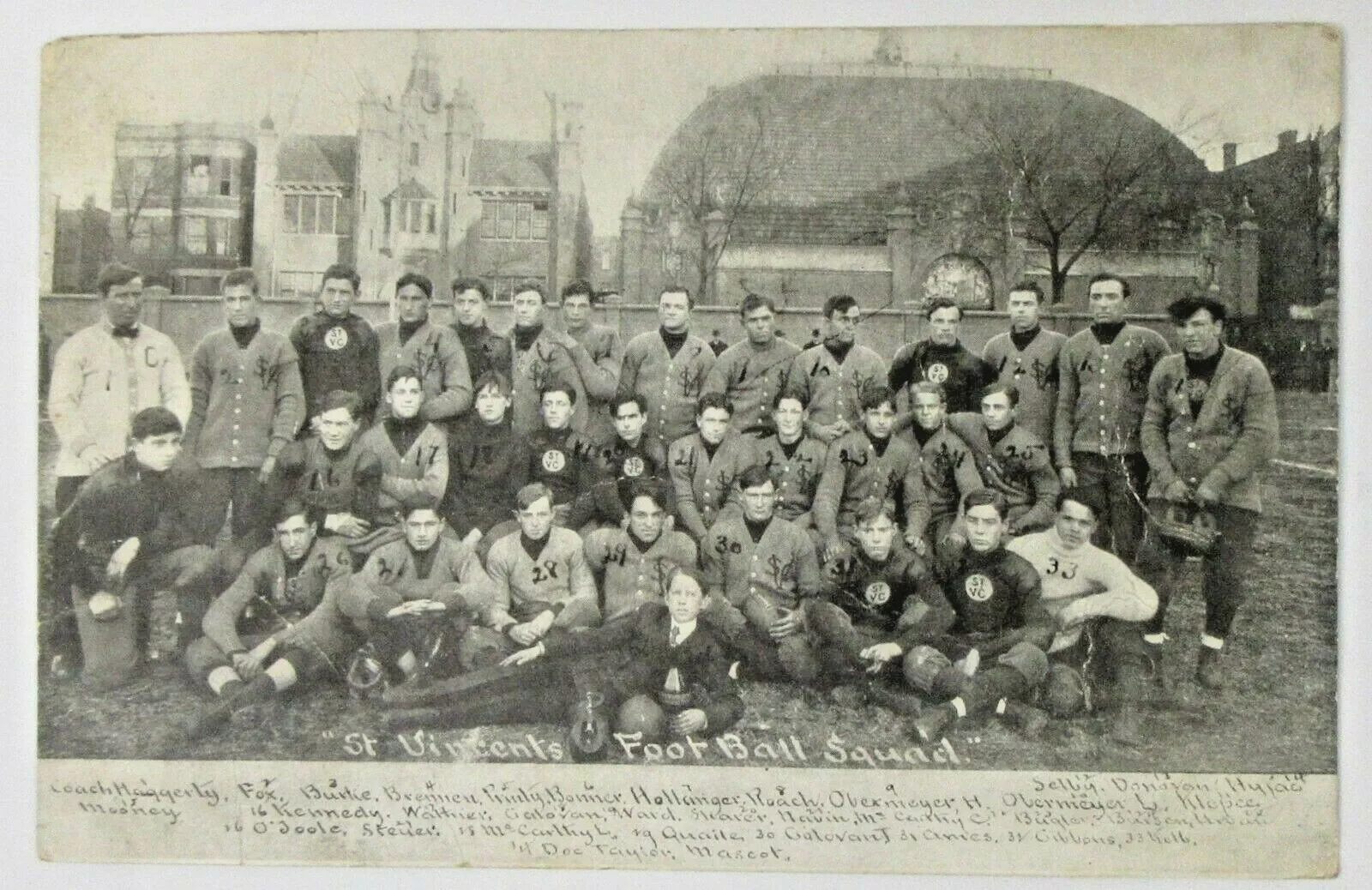
- The 1907 St. Vincent's team, prior to the team becoming the "D-men" in 1908
- Conference: Independent
- Record: 5–2
- Head coach: Frank Haggerty (1st season)
- Captain: Obermyer
- Home stadium: St. Vincent's Field

1907 Midwestern college football independents records
	Conf.			Overall
Team	W	L	T	W		L		T
Marquette		–		6	–	0	–	0
North Dakota Agricultural		–		3	–	0	–	0
Lincoln (MO)		–		1	–	0	–	0
Notre Dame		–		6	–	0	–	1
Miami (OH)		–		6	–	1	–	0
Michigan		–		5	–	1	–	0
Mount Union		–		9	–	2	–	0
Fairmount		–		8	–	2	–	0
Iowa State		–		6	–	2	–	0
Lake Forest		–		4	–	1	–	1
South Dakota State		–		5	–	2	–	0
St. Vincent's (IL)		–		5	–	2	–	0
Wabash		–		5	–	2	–	0
Saint Louis		–		7	–	3	–	0
Western State Normal		–		4	–	2	–	1
Kansas State		–		5	–	3	–	0
Michigan State Normal		–		3	–	2	–	0
Wittenberg		–		5	–	4	–	0
Central Michigan		–		3	–	3	–	0
Drake		–		3	–	4	–	1
Ohio		–		3	–	4	–	1
Western Illinois		–		2	–	3	–	0
Franklin		–		3	–	5	–	1
Heidelberg		–		2	–	4	–	1
Butler		–		1	–	3	–	2
Carthage		–		2	–	5	–	0
Haskell		–		2	–	6	–	1
Chicago P&S		–		1	–	3	–	0
Detroit College		–		1	–	3	–	0
Northern Illinois State		–		1	–	4	–	1
Doane		–		1	–	5	–	0
St. Mary's (OH)		–		0	–	4	–	0
Baldwin–Wallace		–		0	–	6	–	0

The 1907 St. Vincent's football team was an American football team that represented St. Vincent's College, now known as DePaul University, as an independent during the 1907 college football season.

== Schedule ==
Date	Time	Opponent	Site	Result	Attendance	Source
October 19		at Culver Military Academy	Culver, IN	L 0–79 or 0–80		
October 26		Chicago North Division HS (Westcott's Colts)	St. Vincent's Field; Chicago, IL	W 6–5		
November 2		Lake Forest Academy		W 23–6		
November 9		Saint Joseph's (IN)	St. Vincent's Field; Chicago, IL	W 62–0 or 72–0		
November 16		Chicago Physicians and Surgeons	St. Vincent's Field; Chicago, IL	W 45–0		
		Northwestern (WI)		W 67–5		
November 28	2:30 p.m.	Notre Dame	St. Vincent's Field; Chicago, IL	L 12–21	6,000	
