= 1907 Lincoln Tigers football team =

American college football season

1907 Lincoln Tigers football
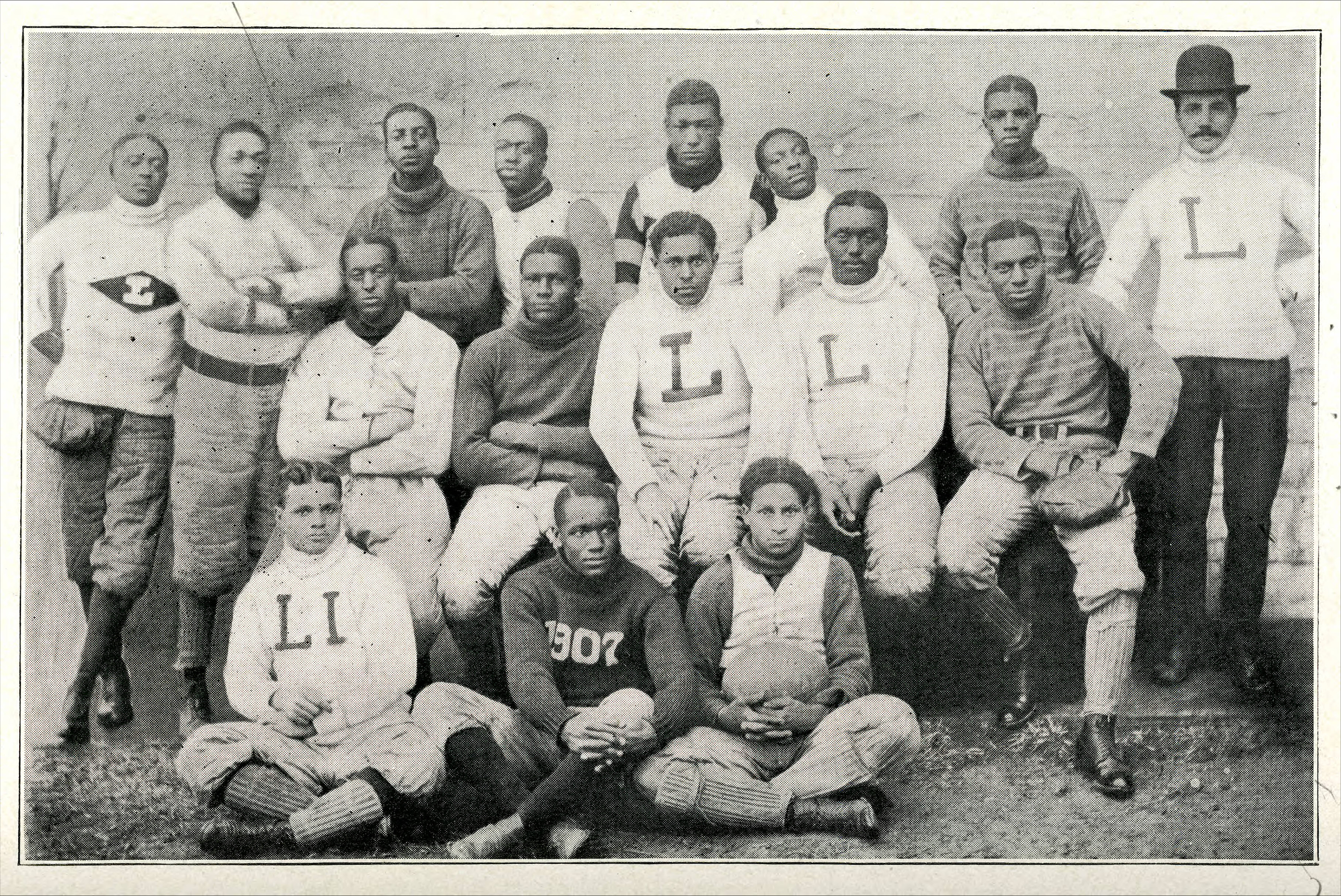
- Conference: Independent
- Record: 1–0
- Head coach: Romeo West (3rd season)

1907 Midwestern college football independents records
	Conf.			Overall
Team	W	L	T	W		L		T
Marquette		–		6	–	0	–	0
North Dakota Agricultural		–		3	–	0	–	0
Lincoln (MO)		–		1	–	0	–	0
Notre Dame		–		6	–	0	–	1
Miami (OH)		–		6	–	1	–	0
Michigan		–		5	–	1	–	0
Mount Union		–		9	–	2	–	0
Fairmount		–		8	–	2	–	0
Iowa State		–		6	–	2	–	0
Lake Forest		–		4	–	1	–	1
South Dakota State		–		5	–	2	–	0
St. Vincent's (IL)		–		5	–	2	–	0
Wabash		–		5	–	2	–	0
Saint Louis		–		7	–	3	–	0
Western State Normal		–		4	–	2	–	1
Kansas State		–		5	–	3	–	0
Michigan State Normal		–		3	–	2	–	0
Wittenberg		–		5	–	4	–	0
Central Michigan		–		3	–	3	–	0
Drake		–		3	–	4	–	1
Ohio		–		3	–	4	–	1
Western Illinois		–		2	–	3	–	0
Franklin		–		3	–	5	–	1
Heidelberg		–		2	–	4	–	1
Butler		–		1	–	3	–	2
Carthage		–		2	–	5	–	0
Haskell		–		2	–	6	–	1
Chicago P&S		–		1	–	3	–	0
Detroit College		–		1	–	3	–	0
Northern Illinois State		–		1	–	4	–	1
Doane		–		1	–	5	–	0
St. Mary's (OH)		–		0	–	4	–	0
Baldwin–Wallace		–		0	–	6	–	0

The 1907 Lincoln Tigers football team represented Lincoln Institute—now known as Lincoln University—in Jefferson City, Missouri as an independent during the 1907 college football season. The Tigers played at least one game this season. A picture of the 1907 team also exists in the Digital Public library of America.

== Schedule ==
Date	Opponent	Site	Result	Source
November 18	Columbia negro football team	Columbia Fairgrounds; Columbia, MO	W 10–0	
