= 1907 Franklin Baptists football team =

American college football season

1907 Franklin Baptists football
- Conference: Independent
- Record: 3–5
- Head coach: Jones
- Captain: Boone (left halfback, right tackle)
- Home stadium: Franklin Field

1907 Midwestern college football independents records
	Conf.			Overall
Team	W	L	T	W		L		T
Marquette		–		6	–	0	–	0
North Dakota Agricultural		–		3	–	0	–	0
Lincoln (MO)		–		1	–	0	–	0
Notre Dame		–		6	–	0	–	1
Miami (OH)		–		6	–	1	–	0
Michigan		–		5	–	1	–	0
Mount Union		–		9	–	2	–	0
Fairmount		–		8	–	2	–	0
Iowa State		–		6	–	2	–	0
Lake Forest		–		4	–	1	–	1
South Dakota State		–		5	–	2	–	0
St. Vincent's (IL)		–		5	–	2	–	0
Wabash		–		5	–	2	–	0
Saint Louis		–		7	–	3	–	0
Western State Normal		–		4	–	2	–	1
Kansas State		–		5	–	3	–	0
Michigan State Normal		–		3	–	2	–	0
Wittenberg		–		5	–	4	–	0
Central Michigan		–		3	–	3	–	0
Drake		–		3	–	4	–	1
Ohio		–		3	–	4	–	1
Western Illinois		–		2	–	3	–	0
Franklin		–		3	–	5	–	1
Heidelberg		–		2	–	4	–	1
Butler		–		1	–	3	–	2
Carthage		–		2	–	5	–	0
Haskell		–		2	–	6	–	1
Chicago P&S		–		1	–	3	–	0
Detroit College		–		1	–	3	–	0
Northern Illinois State		–		1	–	4	–	1
Doane		–		1	–	5	–	0
St. Mary's (OH)		–		0	–	4	–	0
Baldwin–Wallace		–		0	–	6	–	0

The 1907 Franklin Baptists football team represented Franklin College of Indiana during the 1907 college football season.

== Schedule ==
Date	Time	Opponent	Site	Result	Attendance	Source
September 28	8:00 a.m.	DePauw	Greencastle, IN	L 0–4	600	
		Bethany (WV)		L 0–44		
October 9		Notre Dame	Cartier Field; Notre Dame, IN	L 0–23		
October 26		Earlham	Franklin Field; Franklin, IN	L 0–5		
November 4		Butler	Franklin Field; Franklin, IN	T 0–0		
November 9		Winona Tech	Franklin Field; Franklin, IN	W 11–0		
		Winona Tech		W 16–0		
November 15		Wabash Athletic Association	Wabash, IN	L 0–15	1,000	
		Mount Vernon High School		W 31–0		
November 28		Wabash	Wabash, IN	Cancelled		
