= 1907 Marquette Blue and Gold football team =

American college football season

1907 Marquette Blue and Gold football
- Conference: Independent
- Record: 6–0
- Head coach: Cody Clark (1st season)

1907 Midwestern college football independents records
| | Conf. | | | Overall |
| Team | W | L | T | W | | L | | T |
|---|---|---|---|---|---|---|---|---|
| Marquette | | – | | 6 | – | 0 | – | 0 |
| North Dakota Agricultural | | – | | 3 | – | 0 | – | 0 |
| Lincoln (MO) | | – | | 1 | – | 0 | – | 0 |
| Notre Dame | | – | | 6 | – | 0 | – | 1 |
| Miami (OH) | | – | | 6 | – | 1 | – | 0 |
| Michigan | | – | | 5 | – | 1 | – | 0 |
| Mount Union | | – | | 9 | – | 2 | – | 0 |
| Fairmount | | – | | 8 | – | 2 | – | 0 |
| Iowa State | | – | | 6 | – | 2 | – | 0 |
| Lake Forest | | – | | 4 | – | 1 | – | 1 |
| South Dakota State | | – | | 5 | – | 2 | – | 0 |
| St. Vincent's (IL) | | – | | 5 | – | 2 | – | 0 |
| Wabash | | – | | 5 | – | 2 | – | 0 |
| Saint Louis | | – | | 7 | – | 3 | – | 0 |
| Western State Normal | | – | | 4 | – | 2 | – | 1 |
| Kansas State | | – | | 5 | – | 3 | – | 0 |
| Michigan State Normal | | – | | 3 | – | 2 | – | 0 |
| Wittenberg | | – | | 5 | – | 4 | – | 0 |
| Central Michigan | | – | | 3 | – | 3 | – | 0 |
| Drake | | – | | 3 | – | 4 | – | 1 |
| Ohio | | – | | 3 | – | 4 | – | 1 |
| Western Illinois | | – | | 2 | – | 3 | – | 0 |
| Franklin | | – | | 3 | – | 5 | – | 1 |
| Heidelberg | | – | | 2 | – | 4 | – | 1 |
| Butler | | – | | 1 | – | 3 | – | 2 |
| Carthage | | – | | 2 | – | 5 | – | 0 |
| Haskell | | – | | 2 | – | 6 | – | 1 |
| Chicago P&S | | – | | 1 | – | 3 | – | 0 |
| Detroit College | | – | | 1 | – | 3 | – | 0 |
| Northern Illinois State | | – | | 1 | – | 4 | – | 1 |
| Doane | | – | | 1 | – | 5 | – | 0 |
| St. Mary's (OH) | | – | | 0 | – | 4 | – | 0 |
| Baldwin–Wallace | | – | | 0 | – | 6 | – | 0 |

The 1907 Marquette Blue and Gold football team was an American football team that represented Marquette University as an independent during the 1907 college football season. In its first and only season under head coach Cody Clark, the team compiled a 6–0 record.

== Schedule ==
| Date | Opponent | Site | Result | Source |
|---|---|---|---|---|
| October 12 | at Lake Forest | Lake Forest, IL | W 6–0 | |
| October 19 | Fort Sheridan | Milwaukee, WI | W 45–0 | |
| October 26 | Northwestern (WI) | Milwaukee, WI | W 23–0 | |
| November 2 | Lawrence | Milwaukee, WI | W 15–4 | |
| November 9 | Ripon | Milwaukee, WI | W 23–0 | |
| November 16 | Haskell | Milwaukee, WI | W 11–0 | |
