= 1907 All-Eastern football team =

American all-star college football team

The 1907 All-Eastern football team consists of American football players chosen by various selectors as the best players at each position among the Eastern colleges and universities during the 1907 college football season.

== All-Eastern selections ==
=== Quarterbacks ===
- Tad Jones, Yale (NYS-1; BH-1)
- Edward Dillon, Princeton (NYS-2)

=== Halfbacks ===
- Ted Coy, Yale (NYS-1; BH-1)
- Bill Hollenback, Penn (NYS-1)
- Edwin Harlan, Princeton (BH-1)
- A. H. Douglas, Navy (NYS-2)
- Jack Wendell, Harvard (NYS-2)

=== Fullbacks ===
- Jim McCormick, Princeton (NYS-1; BH-1)
- Peter Hauser, Carlisle (NYS-2)

=== Ends ===
- Caspar Wister, Princeton (NYS-2; BH-1)
- Bill Dague, Navy (NYS-1)
- Albert Exendine, Carlisle (NYS-1)
- Hunter Scarlett, Penn (BH-1)
- Clarence Alcott, Yale (NYS-2)

=== Tackles ===
- Lucius Horatio Biglow, Yale (NYS-1; BH-1)
- Dexter W. Draper, Penn (NYS-1; BH-1)
- Bill Horr, Syracuse (NYS-2)
- Bernard O'Rourke, Cornell (NYS-2)

=== Guards ===
- William Erwin, Army (NYS-1; BH-1)
- Elmer Thompson, Cornell (NYS-2; BH-1)
- Gus Ziegler, Penn (NYS-1)
- William Goebel, Yale (NYS-2)

=== Centers ===
- Patrick Grant, Harvard (NYS-1; BH-1)
- Frank Slingluff Jr., Navy (NYS-2)

== Key ==
- NYS = New York Sun
- BH = Boston Herald

== See also ==
- 1907 College Football All-America Team
