= 1906 All-Eastern football team =

American all-star college football team

The 1906 All-Eastern football team consists of American football players chosen by various selectors as the best players at each position among the Eastern colleges and universities during the 1906 college football season.

== All-Eastern selections ==
=== Quarterbacks ===
- Edward Dillon, Princeton (PGT-1)
- Norton, Navy (NYS-1)
- Price, Washington & Jefferson (PGT-1)
- Tad Jones, Yale (NYS-2)

=== Halfbacks ===
- Veeder, Yale (PGT-1)
- Greene, Penn (PGT-1)
- Mayhew, Brown (NYS-1)
- Bill Hollenback, Penn (NYS-1)
- Knox, Yale (NYS-2)
- Hubbard, Amherst (NYS-2)

=== Fullbacks ===
- Jack Wendell, Harvard (NYS-1; PGT-1)
- Sieber, Gettysburg (NYS-2)

=== Ends ===
- Levine, Penn (NYS-2; PGT-1)
- Forbes, Yale (NYS-1)
- Caspar Wister, Princeton (NYS-1; PGT-1)
- Albert Exendine, Carlisle (NYS-2)

=== Tackles ===
- Coone, Princeton (NYS-2; PGT-1)
- Lucius Horatio Biglow, Yale (NYS-1; PGT-1)
- Dexter W. Draper, Penn (NYS-1)
- Weeks, Army (NYS-2)

=== Guards ===
- Elmer Thompson, Cornell (NYS-1; PGT-1)
- Burr, Harvard (NYS-1; PGT-1)
- Kersburg, Harvard (NYS-2)
- Gus Ziegler, Penn (NYS-2)

=== Centers ===
- Hockenberger, Yale (NYS-1; PGT-1)
- Newman, Cornell (NYS-2)

== Key ==
- NYS = New York Sun
- PGT = Pittsburgh Gazette Times

== See also ==
- 1906 College Football All-America Team
