= Charles Osborne (American football) =

American football player and coach

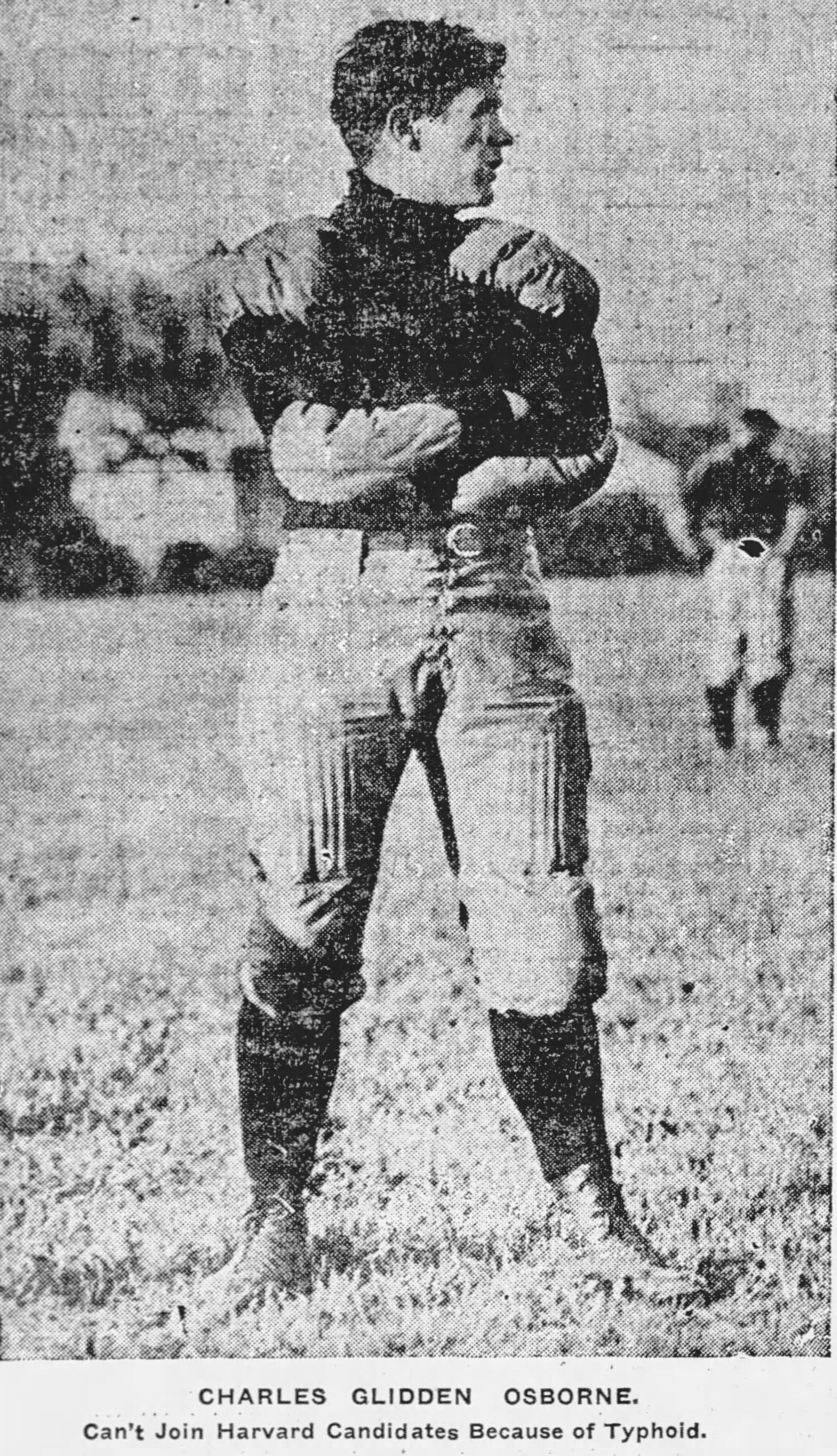

Profile
- Positions: Tackle, fullback

Personal information
- Born: February 9, 1884; Boston, Massachusetts, U.S.
- Died: January 15, 1961 (age 76); Hastings, England

Career information
- College: Harvard University

Career history

Playing
- 1904–1906: Harvard University

Coaching
- 1907–: Harvard University

Awards and highlights
- Consensus All-American (1906)

Charles Glidden Osborne (February 9, 1884 – January 15, 1961) was an American football player and coach.

Osborne was born in the Roxbury neighborhood of Boston in 1884. He attended the Charterhouse School in England and the Magdalen College, Oxford.

After studying at Oxford, Osborne returned to the United States and enrolled at Harvard University. He played college football at the fullback position for Harvard Crimson in 1904 to 1905. In 1906, he was moved to the tackle position. He helped lead the 1906 Harvard Crimson football team to a 10–1, the sole loss being a close game against national champion Yale. At the end of the 1906 season, he was selected by Caspar Whitney, Charles Chadwick, and The New York Times, as a first-team tackle on the 1906 All-America college football team. Walter Camp named him to his All-America second team. He was a player who reportedly "enjoyed the game himself every minute he was playing" and "played football purely for the fun he got out of it." He also played for Harvard's cricket and association football teams and was a member of D.K.E., Hasting Pudding, Signet and Digamma clubs.

After graduating in 1907, Osborne became an assistant coach to the Harvard football team. In the fall of 1907, he wrote a letter to the Harvard Crimson advocating the formation of an alumni football team that would play against Harvard's varsity team each fall. Under Osborne's proposal, the alumni players "would be enabled to keep up their football for a few weeks every fall," and they would benefit the varsity team by allowing them regularly to play "against the strongest possible kind of scrub team."

Osborne died in 1961 in Hastings, England. He was buried in the Garden of Remembrance at the Hastings Cemetery and Crematorium.
