= 1906 All-America college football team =

Official list of the best college football players of 1906

The 1906 Collier's Weekly team named by Walter Camp

The 1906 All-America college football team is composed of college football players who were selected as All-Americans by various organizations and writers that chose All-America college football teams for the 1906 college football season. The organizations that chose the teams included Walter Camp for Collier's Weekly, Caspar Whitney for Outing Magazine, the New York World, the New York Sun, The New York Times, the New York Mail, and Charles Chadwick.

== Overview ==
The 1906 college football season was a year of change. Following controversies in 1905 over the increase of violence and professionalism in college football, a number of rule changes were implemented in 1906. The most lasting change introduced in 1906 was the forward pass. Several of the players selected as All-Americans in 1906 gained attention for their use of the new tactic. These include Eddie Dillon, the first Princeton quarterback to make use of the forward pass, and Yale's Paul Veeder and Bob Forbes who combined for one of the first important pass plays, a play described in one history of the game as follows: "The only other significant pass that season was thrown by Yale, which gained a first down that led to victory over Harvard, when Paul Veeder threw thirty yards to Bob Forbes."

The Eastern powers dominated the game of college football in 1906, and players from the Ivy League dominated the All-American selections. Both the Princeton Tigers and the Yale Bulldogs finished with undefeated seasons and played each other to a 0–0 tie on November 17, 1906. Out of 15 players recognized in the NCAA Record Book as consensus All-Americans for the 1906 season, 13 played for Ivy League teams, and 7 played for Princeton or Yale. Only two players from "western" schools were first-team selections—quarterback Walter Eckersall from the University of Chicago and center William Thomas Dunn from Penn State.

The only unanimous first-team All-American in 1906 was Yale end Bob Forbes. Other players who were named to the first team by at least five of the eight selectors reflected below were end Caspar Wister of Princeton (6 first-team designations), tackle Lucius Horatio Biglow of Yale (7 selections), guard Francis Burr of Harvard (7 selections), guard Elmer Thompson of Cornell (5 selections), center Clarence Hockenberger of Yale (5 selections), and halfback Hugh Knox of Yale (5 selections).

The Washington Post in December 1906 wrote of the difficulty involved in selecting eleven players for an All-American team:

"A big problem confronts the person who this year undertakes to select eleven men for a football team which he wishes to call the best in the country. There are more good men than ever before, among the minor elevens, because, with a premium, placed on speed rather than on weight, the lighter men have had a better opportunity to distinguish themselves. It would be possible to pick at least three teams which would make things mighty interesting for each other. The East has completely eclipsed the West this season, and that somewhat simplifies matters. The Western teams failed to grasp the possibilities of the new rules and players of that section who were brilliant last year did not get an opportunity, to shine this year in the new game. Walter Eckersall, of Chicago, appears to be the only Westerner who has a right to be in the All-American team this fall."

In announcing his All-American team, Caspar Whitney wrote that he had weighed character as a factor in his selections:

"This eleven is chosen, after a season's observation, with a view to collecting the most resourceful, strongest all-round team under the new rules. No man whose amateur status is a matter of question or whose play has been unsportsmanly is eligible to this national team, which, in keeping with its honorary nature, I endeavor to confine to sportsmen."

== All-American selections for 1906 ==
=== Ends ===
End Bobby Mitchell of Minnesota, one of the first black players named to an All-America team.

- **Robert Forbes**, Yale (WC-1; CW-1; NYW-1; NYS-1; CC-1; NYT-1; NYM-1; COMP)
- **Caspar Wister**, Princeton (WC-1; CW-1; NYW-1; NYS-1; CC-1; COMP)
- Clarence Alcott, Yale (CW-2)
- George Levene, Penn (WC-3; CW-2; NYS-2; CC-2; NYT-2)
- Albert Exendine, Carlisle (College Football Hall of Fame) (WC-3; NYS-2; CC-2; NYT-2)
- Bill Dague, Navy (WC-2; NYT-1)
- Hunter Scarlett, Penn (College Football Hall of Fame) (NYM-1)
- Bobby Marshall, Minnesota (College Football Hall of Fame) (WC-2)

=== Tackles ===
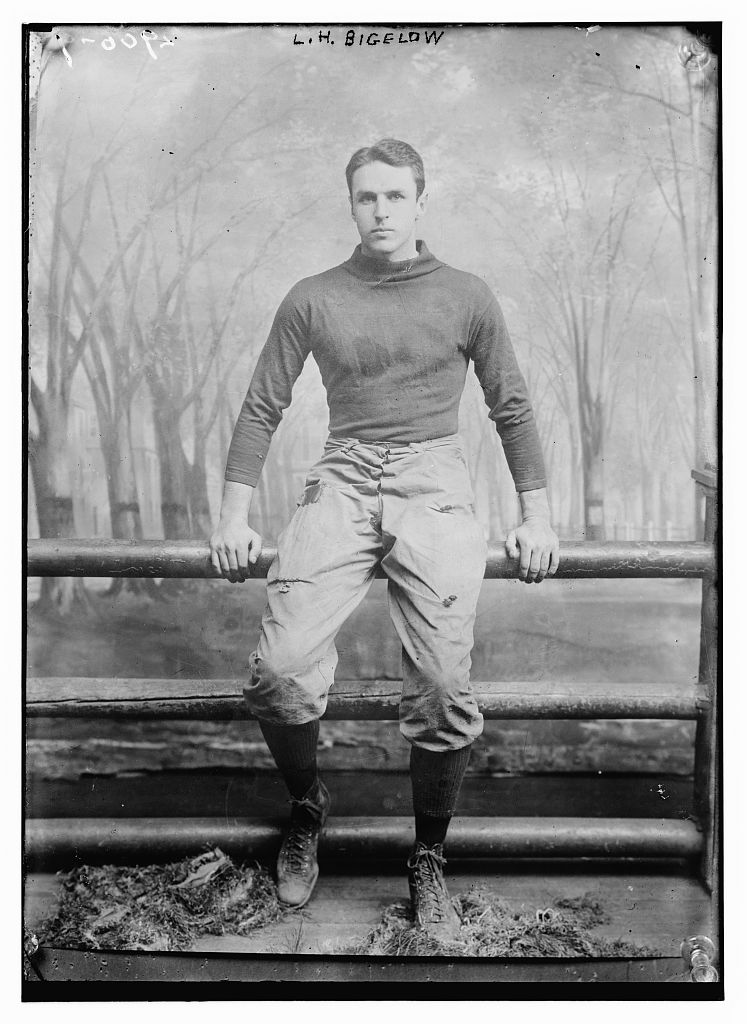
Lucius Horatio Biglow of Yale.

- **Lucius Horatio Biglow**, Yale (WC-1; CW-1; NYS-1; CC-1; NYT-1; NYM-1; COMP)
- **James Cooney**, Princeton (WC-1; NYW-1; NYS-2; CC-2; NYM-1; COMP)
- **Charles Osborne**, Harvard (WC-2; CW-1; CC-1; NYT-1)
- Henry J. Weeks, Army (WC-3; CW-2; NYS-2; CC-2; NYT-2)
- Percy Northcroft, Navy (WC-3; CW-2)
- Daniel Pullen, Army (NYW-1)
- Dexter Draper, Penn (WC-2; NYS-1; NYT-2)

=== Guards ===
- **Francis Burr**, Harvard (WC-1; CW-1; NYW-1; NYS-1; CC-1; NYT-1; COMP)
- **Elmer Thompson**, Cornell (WC-1; CW-2; NYW-1; NYS-1; NYM-1; COMP; NYT-2)
- **Gus Ziegler**, Penn (WC-2; CW-1; NYS-2; CC-2; NYM-1; NYT-2)
- George R. Meyer, Navy (CW-2)
- Arthur Brides, Yale (CC-1)
- Harry von Kersburg, Harvard (WC-3; NYS-2; CC-2; NYT-1)
- Edward Dillon, Princeton (WC-2)
- William C. Christy, Army (WC-3)

=== Centers ===
- **William Thomas Dunn**, Penn State (WC-1)
- **William Newman**, Cornell (CW-1; NYS-2)
- Clarence Hockenberger, Yale (WC-2; CW-2; NYW-1; NYS-1; CC-2; NYT-1; NYM-1; COMP)
- Bartol Parker, Harvard (CC-1; NYT-2)
- Oscar Hunt, Carlisle Indians (WC-3)

=== Quarterbacks ===
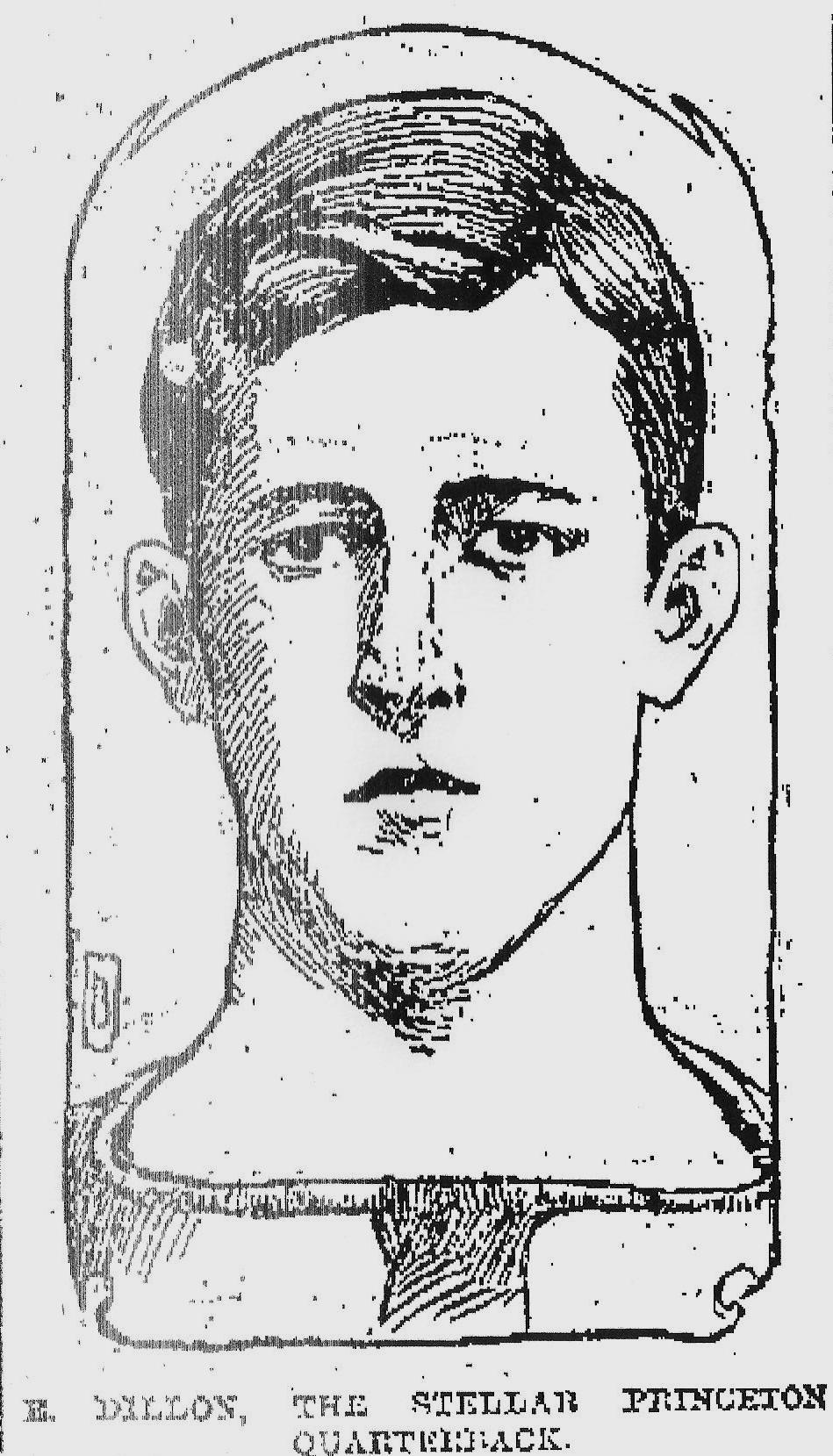
Eddie Dillon of Princeton.

- **Walter Eckersall**, Chicago (WC-1; CW-1 [fb]; NYM-1; COMP)
- **Edward Dillon**, Princeton (WC-3; CW-1; CC-1; NYT-1)
- Tad Jones, Yale (WC-2; CW-2; NYW-1; NYS-2; CC-2)
- Homer H. Norton, Navy (College Football Hall of Fame) (NYS-1; NYT-2)

=== Halfbacks ===
- **William F. Knox**, Yale (WC-1; CW-1; NYW-1; NYS-2; CC-2; NYM-1; COMP; NYT-2)
- **John W. Mayhew**, Brown (WC-1; CW-2; NYS-1; CC-1; NYT-1)
- **Bill Hollenback**, Penn (College Football Hall of Fame) (WC-2; CW-1; NYS-1; NYM-1 [fb])
- Jack Hubbard, Amherst (NYS-2; NYW-1)
- Archibald H. Douglas, Navy (CC-2)
- Bob Folwell, Penn (NYT-1)
- J. Owsley Manier, Vanderbilt (WC-3)
- Edward Green, Penn (NYT-2)

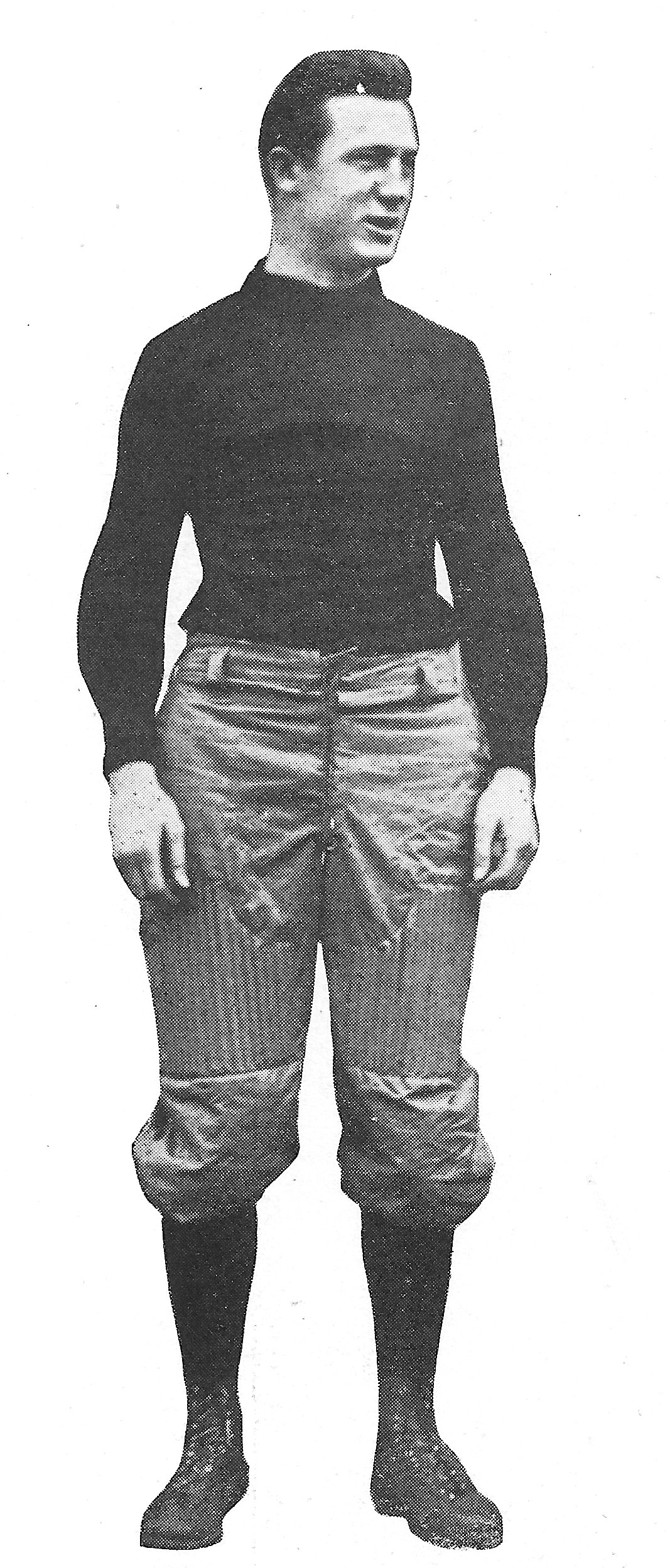
Bill Hollenback of Penn.

=== Fullbacks ===
- **Paul Veeder**, Yale (WC-1; CC-1 [hb]; NYM-1 [hb]; COMP [hb])
- Jack Wendell, Harvard (WC-2 [hb]; CW-2; NYS-1; NYT-1)
- George Walder, Cornell (CW-2)
- James B. McCormick, Princeton (College Football Hall of Fame) (WC-2; NYW-1; CC-2; COMP; NYT-2)
- Samuel F. B. Morse, Yale (WC-3 [hb]; CC-1)
- Paul R. "Polly" Sieber, Gettysburg (NYS-2)
- John Garrels, Michigan (WC-3)

=== Key ===
NCAA recognized selectors for 1906

- WC = Walter Camp for Collier's Weekly
- CW = Caspar Whitney for Outing magazine

Other selectors

- NYW = New York World by Robert W. Edgren
- NYS = New York Sun
- CC = Charles Chadwick
- NYT = The New York Times
- NYM = New York Mail
- COMP = A composite All-American team distilled from the All-American selected by nine of "the most prominent of the eastern sporting writers and critics"

Bold = Consensus All-American

- 1 – First-team selection
- 2 – Second-team selection
- 3 – Third-team selection

== See also ==
- 1906 All-Southern college football team
- 1906 All-Western college football team
