= William Erwin =

William Erwin may refer to:

- Bill Erwin (1914–2010), American actor
- William Portwood Erwin (1895–1927), World War I flying ace
- William Erwin (American football) (1884–1953), American football player and U.S. Army officer
