= Robert Forbes (American football) =

American football player and coach (1882–1947)

- Forbes in 1908

Biographical details
- Born: November 2, 1882; Dalton, Massachusetts, U.S.
- Died: July 6, 1947 (aged 64); New York City, U.S.

Playing career
- 1902: Wesleyan
- 1905–1906: Yale
- Positions: End, tackle

Coaching career (HC unless noted)
- 1907: Army (assistant)
- 1908–1909: Oregon

Head coaching record
- Overall: 8–4

Accomplishments and honors

Awards
- Consensus All-American (1906); Second-team All-American (1905)

Robert Wilson Forbes (November 2, 1882 – July 6, 1947) was an American college football player and coach. He was a first-team All-American end for Yale University in 1906 and was the recipient of one of the most significant passes in the first season in which the forward pass was legalized. He later served as the head football coach at the United States Military Academy and the University of Oregon.

== Biography ==
Forbes attended Wesleyan and later Yale University. He played football at the tackle position for Yale University in 1905 and at the end position in 1906.

The 1906 season was the first in which the forward pass was legalized, and Forbes caught one of the first big catches of the 1906 season. In her book, The Real All Americans, Sally Jenkins described Forbes' catch as one of the most significant in the first year of the passing game: "The only other significant pass that season was thrown by Yale, which gained a first down that led to victory over Harvard, when Paul Veeder threw thirty yards to Bob Forbes." Forbes was also a second-team All-American in 1905 and a consensus All-American in 1906, receiving first-team honors from Walter Camp for Collier's Weekly, Caspar Whitney for Outing magazine, New York World by Bob Edgren, and New York Sun.

After graduating from Yale in 1907, Forbes was hired as the head coach of the football team at the United States Military Academy at West Point, New York. He was the first regular head coach hired for the Army football team. By the fall of 1907, Henry Smither had been appointed head coach of the Army team, with Forbes as an assistant coach. The Pittsburgh Press praised Forbes in his first year with Army: "West Point's strength on defense was a tribute to Bob Forbes' knowledge of Yale football. He had his opponents sized up very well, indeed, and gave his old team-mates a severe tryout with his cadet charges."

After one year of coaching at West Point, Forbes moved west and played with the Seattle Athletic Club against Spokane on New Year's Day 1908. In February 1908, he was hired by the University of Oregon, where he served as the head football coach in 1908 and 1909. It was reported that the salary paid by the University of Oregon to Forbes was the highest paid a football coach in the northwest up to that point.

After he left football he returned to the East coast, where he became a wholesale lumber dealer.

Forbes died of a heart attack in his home in New York City on July 6, 1947. He was 64 years old at the time of his death.

== Head coaching record ==
Year	Team	Overall	Conference	Standing	Bowl/playoffs
Oregon Webfoots (Northwest Conference) (1908–1909)
1908	Oregon	5–2	1–2	T–3rd	
1909	Oregon	3–2	2–1	3rd	
Oregon:		8–4	3–3		
Total:		8–4			
