= List of North Dakota State Bison head football coaches =

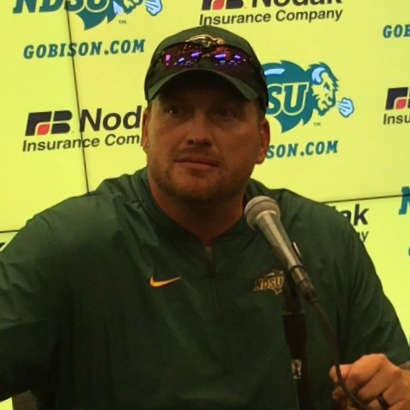
Matt Entz served as head coach of the North Dakota State Bison from 2019 to 2023.

The North Dakota State Bison college football team represents North Dakota State University as part of the Mountain West Conference. The Bison competes as part of the NCAA Division I Football Championship Subdivision. The program has had 32 head coaches since it began play during the 1894 season. Since December 2023, Tim Polasek has served as head coach at North Dakota State.

In that time, 11 coaches have led North Dakota State to the postseason: Darrell Mudra, Ron Erhardt, Jim Wacker, Don Morton, Earle Solomonson, Rocky Hager, Bob Babich, Craig Bohl, Chris Klieman, Matt Entz, and Polasek. The Bison have also won 23 combined conference championships: Casey Finnegan captured two, Mudra two, Erhardt six, Ev Kjelbertson two, Wacker two, Morton four, Solomonson two, and Hager five as a member of the North Central Conference; Bohl captured one as a member of the Great West Conference; Bohl captured three, Klieman five, Entz two, and Polasek one as a member of the MVFC. Mudra and Erhardt each captured College Division national championships; Morton and Solomonson each captured Division II national championships; and, Bohl, Klieman, Entz, and Polasek each captured Football Bowl Subdivision national championships.

Finnegan is the leader in seasons coached with 13 and Bohl is the leader games won, with 104 victories. Gil Dobie has the highest winning percentage of those who have coached more than one game, with 1.000. Henry Luke Bolley has the lowest winning percentage of those who have coached more than one game, with .469. Of the 31 different head coaches who have led the Bison, Dobie and Mudra have been inducted into the College Football Hall of Fame.

== Key ==
Key to symbols in coaches list
| General | | Overall | | Conference | | Postseason (Note: Although the first Rose Bowl Game was played in 1902, it has been continuously played since the 1916 game, and is recognized as the oldest bowl game by the NCAA. "—" indicates any season prior to 1916 when postseason games were not played.) | |
|---|---|---|---|---|---|---|---|
| No. | Order of coaches (Note: A running total of the number of head coaches, with coaches who served separate tenures being counted only once. Interim head coaches are represented with "Int" and are not counted in the running total. "—" indicates the team played but either without a coach or no coach is on record. "X" indicates an interim year without play.) | GC | Games coached | CW | Conference wins | PW | Postseason wins |
| DC | Division championships | OW | Overall wins | CL | Conference losses | PL | Postseason losses |
| CC | Conference championships | OL | Overall losses | CT | Conference ties | PT | Postseason ties |
| NC | National championships | OT | Overall ties (Note: Overtime rules in college football were introduced in 1996, making ties impossible in the period since.) | C% | Conference winning percentage | | |
| † | Elected to the College Football Hall of Fame | O% | Overall winning percentage (Note: When computing the win–loss percentage, a tie counts as half a win and half a loss.) | | | | |

== Coaches ==
List of head football coaches showing season(s) coached, overall records, conference records, postseason records, championships and selected awards (Note: Statistics correct as of the end of the 2023 NCAA Division I FCS football season.)
| No. | Name | Season(s) (Note: North Dakota State did not field teams in 1918 due to World War I and in 1943 and 1944 due to World War II.) | GC | OW | OL | OT | O% | CW | CL | CT | C% | PW | PL | PT | CC | NC | Awards |
|---|---|---|---|---|---|---|---|---|---|---|---|---|---|---|---|---|---|
| 1 | Henry Luke Bolley | 1894–1899 | 16 | 7 | 8 | 1 | 0.469 | — | — | — | — | — | — | — | — | 0 | — |
| 2 | Jack Harrison | 1900–1901 | 17 | 15 | 1 | 1 | 0.912 | — | — | — | — | — | — | — | — | 0 | — |
| 3 | Eddie Cochems | 1902–1903 | 10 | 9 | 1 | 0 | 0.900 | — | — | — | — | — | — | — | — | 0 | — |
| 4 | A. L. Marshall | 1904–1905 | 12 | 4 | 7 | 1 | 0.375 | — | — | — | — | — | — | — | — | 0 | — |
| 5 | Gil Dobie^{†} | 1906–1907 | 8 | 8 | 0 | 0 | 1.000 | — | — | — | — | — | — | — | — | 0 | — |
| 6 | Paul Magoffin | 1908 | 5 | 2 | 3 | 0 | 0.400 | — | — | — | — | — | — | — | — | 0 | — |
| 7 | Arthur Rueber | 1909–1912 | 20 | 12 | 7 | 1 | 0.625 | — | — | — | — | — | — | — | — | 0 | — |
| 8 | Howard Wood | 1913–1914 | 12 | 5 | 5 | 2 | 0.500 | — | — | — | — | — | — | — | — | 0 | — |
| 9 | Paul J. Davis | 1915–1917 | 18 | 10 | 7 | 1 | 0.583 | — | — | — | — | — | — | — | — | 0 | — |
| 10 | Stanley Borleske | 1919–1921; 1923–1924; 1928 | 43 | 20 | 18 | 5 | 0.523 | 5 | 9 | 0 | 0.357 | — | — | — | 0 | 0 | — |
| 11 | Joe Cutting | 1922 | 8 | 6 | 2 | 0 | 0.750 | 1 | 2 | 0 | 0.333 | — | — | — | 0 | 0 | — |
| 12 | Ion Cortright | 1925–1927 | 23 | 13 | 8 | 2 | 0.609 | 7 | 6 | 2 | 0.533 | — | — | — | 0 | 0 | — |
| 13 | Casey Finnegan | 1928–1940 | 116 | 57 | 48 | 11 | 0.539 | 26 | 24 | 5 | 0.518 | — | — | — | 2 | 0 | — |
| 14 | Stan Kostka | 1941; 1946–1947 | 25 | 8 | 17 | 0 | 0.320 | 6 | 10 | 0 | 0.375 | — | — | — | 0 | 0 | — |
| 15 | Robert A. Lowe | 1942; 1945 | 14 | 3 | 9 | 2 | 0.286 | 2 | 3 | 0 | 0.400 | — | — | — | 0 | 0 | — |
| 16 | Howard Bliss | 1948–1949 | 19 | 3 | 16 | 0 | 0.158 | 2 | 10 | 0 | 0.167 | — | — | — | 0 | 0 | — |
| 17 | Mac Wenskunas | 1950–1953 | 33 | 11 | 21 | 1 | 0.348 | 7 | 16 | 1 | 0.313 | — | — | — | 0 | 0 | — |
| 18 | Del Anderson | 1954–1955 | 18 | 1 | 16 | 1 | 0.083 | 1 | 10 | 1 | 0.125 | — | — | — | 0 | 0 | — |
| 19 | Les Luymes | 1956 | 9 | 5 | 4 | 0 | 0.556 | 3 | 3 | 0 | 0.500 | — | — | — | 0 | 0 | — |
| 20 | Bob Danielson | 1957–1962 | 54 | 13 | 39 | 2 | 0.259 | 8 | 25 | 2 | 0.257 | — | — | — | 0 | 0 | — |
| 21 | Darrell Mudra^{†} | 1963–1965 | 30 | 24 | 6 | 0 | 0.800 | 14 | 4 | 0 | 0.778 | 2 | 0 | 0 | 2 | 1 – 1965 | — |
| 22 | Ron Erhardt | 1966–1972 | 69 | 61 | 7 | 1 | 0.891 | 39 | 4 | 0 | 0.907 | 3 | 1 | 0 | 6 | 2 – 1968, 1969 | — |
| 23 | Ev Kjelbertson | 1973–1975 | 30 | 17 | 13 | 0 | 0.567 | 12 | 9 | 0 | 0.571 | 0 | 0 | 0 | 2 | 0 | — |
| 24 | Jim Wacker | 1976–1978 | 34 | 24 | 9 | 1 | 0.721 | 15 | 3 | 1 | 0.816 | 2 | 2 | 0 | 2 | 0 | — |
| 25 | Don Morton | 1979–1984 | 72 | 57 | 15 | 0 | 0.792 | 39 | 6 | 0 | 0.867 | 8 | 3 | 0 | 4 | 1 – 1983 | AFCA Coach of the Year Award (1983) |
| 26 | Earle Solomonson | 1985–1986 | 27 | 24 | 2 | 1 | 0.907 | 16 | 1 | 1 | 0.917 | 6 | 0 | 0 | 2 | 2 – 1985, 1986 | AFCA Coach of the Year Award (1986) |
| 27 | Rocky Hager | 1987–1996 | 117 | 91 | 25 | 1 | 0.782 | 70 | 18 | 1 | 0.792 | 13 | 5 | 0 | 5 | 2 – 1988, 1990 | AFCA Coach of the Year Award (1988, 1990) |
| 28 | Bob Babich | 1997–2002 | 68 | 46 | 22 | — | 0.676 | 34 | 18 | — | 0.654 | 13 | 5 | — | 0 | 0 | — |
| 29 | Craig Bohl | 2003–2013 | 136 | 104 | 32 | — | 0.765 | 49 | 24 | — | 0.547 | 13 | 1 | — | 4 | 3 – 2011, 2012, 2013 | AFCA Coach of the Year Award (2012, 2013); Eddie Robinson Coach of the Year (2012, 2013) |
| 30 | Chris Klieman | 2014–2018 | 75 | 69 | 6 | — | 0.920 | 36 | 4 | — | 0.900 | 18 | 1 | — | 5 | 4 – 2014, 2015, 2017, 2018 | — |
| 31 | Matt Entz | 2019–2023 | 71 | 60 | 11 | — | 0.845 | 32 | 7 | — | 0.821 | 15 | 3 | — | 2 | 2 – 2019, 2021 | AFCA Coach of the Year Award (2019, 2021) |
| 32 | Tim Polasek | 2024–present | 29 | 26 | 3 | — | 0.897 | 15 | 1 | — | 0.938 | 4 | 1 | — | 2 | 1 – 2024 | — |
