= 1907 All-Western college football team =

American all-star college football team

The 1907 All-Western college football team consists of American football players selected to the All-Western teams chosen by various selectors for the 1907 college football season. One player, Germany Schulz, was also a consensus All-American.

== All-Western selections ==
=== Ends ===
- Harry S. Hammond, Michigan (CA, CDN, CE, CIO, CJ, COL, CRH, WE)
- Hewitt, Chicago (CA, CDN, CP, CRH)
- Harlan Page, Chicago (CIO, CJ, CP) (CBHOF)
- Harlan Rogers, Wisconsin (CE)

=== Tackles ===
- Walter Rheinschild, Michigan (CA, CDN, CE, COL, CP, CRH, WE)
- John Messmer, Wisconsin (CA, CIO, CJ, COL [guard], CRH, WE [guard])
- George Leland Case, Minnesota (CDN, CIO, CP, WE)
- Ivan Doseff, Chicago (CE, CJ, COL)

=== Guards ===
- Forest Van Hook, Illinois (CA, CDN, CE, CIO, CJ, COL, CP, CRH, WE)
- Walter D. Graham, Michigan (CIO, CJ, CP, CRH)
- William John Bandelin, Minnesota (CA, CE)
- Harris, Chicago (CDN)

=== Centers ===
- Germany Schulz, Michigan (CA, CDN, CE, CIO, CJ, COL, CP, CRH, WE) (CFHOF)

=== Quarterbacks ===
- Walter Steffen, Chicago (CA, CDN, CE, CIO, CJ, COL, CP, CRH, WE) (CFHOF)

=== Halfbacks ===
- Leo DeTray, Chicago (CA [fullback], CDN, CE, CIO, CJ, COL, CP, CRH [fullback], WE)
- Carroll N. Kirk, Iowa (CA, CE, CRH)
- John Robert Schuknecht, Minnesota (CIO, CJ, COL [fullback])
- Harold Iddings, Chicago (CDN, COL [end], WE)
- Oscar Osthoff, Wisconsin (CP)

=== Fullbacks ===
- George Capron, Minnesota (CA [halfback], CDN, CE, CIO, CJ, COL [halfback], CP, CRH [halfback], WE [end])
- John H. Weller, Nebraska (WE)

== Key ==
Bold = consensus choice by a majority of the selectors

CA = Chicago American

CDN = Chicago Daily News

CE = Chicago Examiner

CIO = Chicago Inter-Ocean

CJ = Chicago Journal

COL = Collier's Weekly

CP = Chicago Evening Post

CRH = Chicago Record-Herald

WE = Walter Eckersall for the Chicago Tribune

CFHOF = College Football Hall of Fame

CBHOF = College Basketball Hall of Fame

== See also ==
- 1907 College Football All-America Team
