= George Capron =

American football and baseball player (1886–1972)

Profile
- Position: Halfback

Personal information
- Born: July 27, 1886; Minneapolis, Minnesota, U.S.
- Died: October 26, 1972 (aged 86); Fresno, California, U.S.

Career information
- College: Minnesota

Awards and highlights
- Third-team All-American (1907); First-team All-Western (1907)

George H. Capron (July 27, 1886 – October 26, 1972) was an American college football and baseball player and multimillionaire investor in Southern California real estate.

== Athletic career ==
Capron played football and baseball for the University of Minnesota from 1907 to 1908. In 1907, the Minnesota football team scored only 55 points, and "Capron accounted for 44 of them with dropkicked field goals at four points each." He was selected as a third-team All-American by Walter Camp at the end of the 1907 season.

Late in his career at the University of Minnesota, Capron became involved in a controversy over his eligibility when reports surfaced that he had played professional baseball under a false name. Capron later admitted that he played baseball under the name Robb at Meridian, Mississippi in 1908 and at Mattoon, Illinois in 1907. From 1909 to 1910, Capron played two years of professional baseball in the Northwestern League. In 1909, he played 155 games as the left fielder for the Seattle Turks, compiling 164 hits, 27 doubles, 8 triples, 15 home runs, and a .275 batting average. In 1910, he played 35 games for the Vancouver Beavers though his batting average dropped to .207.

He also played professional football in the early days of the professional game in the 1910s.

== Family and later years ==
Capron's younger brother, Ralph Capron, played Major League Baseball and in the National Football League.

Capron practiced law in Minnesota for a time. He then moved to California where he invested in land. He was credited with having an "uncanny foresight in predicting population trends," acquiring properties in Orange, Los Angeles, Riverside, and San Bernardino Counties, and became a multimillionaire with an estate valued at $24 million.

In later years, Capron was in poor health and was the subject of conservatorship proceedings and allegations that his wife's family and others had stolen from him and procured a 1967 will by fraud and undue influence.

Capron moved to Fresno, California, in 1967. He was in poor health in his later years. He died on October 26, 1972, at age 86, at a Fresno hospital.

== See also ==
- 1907 College Football All-America Team
