= Octy =

Octy may refer to:

- Walter D. Graham (c. 1885–1927), American football player nicknamed "Octy"
- Octy, a character in the arcade game Baraduke
- Octy, a character of the Guilty Gear series
