= 1907 All-America college football team =

Official list of the best college football players of 1907

The 1907 All-America college football team is composed of various organizations that chose All-America college football teams that season. The organizations that chose the teams included Collier's Weekly selected by Walter Camp.

== All-Americans of 1907 ==
=== Ends ===
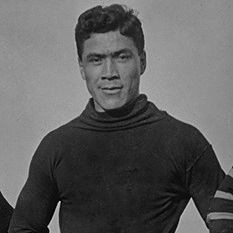
Albert Exendine of Carlisle

- **Bill Dague**, Navy (WC-1; NYT; CR)
- **Clarence Alcott**, Yale (WC-1; CW-2; NYH; NYP; CF)
- **Albert Exendine**, Carlisle (College Football Hall of Fame) (WC-2; CW-1; NYW; CR)
- **Caspar Wister**, Princeton (WC-3; CW-1; NYH; NYT; NYW; NYP, AFR)
- Hunter Scarlett, Penn (WC-2; FY-1)
- James Fox Macdonald, Harvard (WC-3; CW-2)
- Bob Blake, Vanderbilt (FY-1, AFR)
- Charles H. Watson, Cornell (CF)

=== Tackles ===
- **Dexter Draper**, Penn (WC-1; CW-1; NYH; NYT; CR)
- **Lucius Horatio Biglow**, Yale (WC-1; CW-1; NYT; NYW; NYP; FY-1; CF; CR [g], AFR)
- Bill Horr, Syracuse (WC-2; NYH)
- Bernard O'Rourke, Cornell (WC-2; CW-2; NYP; CF)
- Henry J. Weeks, Army (WC-3; CW-2)
- Benjamin Lang, Dartmouth (WC-3)
- Walter Rheinschild, Michigan (FY-1)
- Daniel Pullen, Army (NYW)
- Edwin J. Donnelly, Trinity (CR)

=== Guards ===
- **Gus Ziegler**, Penn (WC-1; CW-1; NYH; NYT; CF; CR, AFR)
- **William Erwin**, Army (WC-1; CW-1; NYT; FY-1; CF)
- Edward Rich, Dartmouth (WC-2)
- Elmer Thompson, Cornell (WC-2; CW-2; NYH; NYW; NYP; FY-1, AFR)
- Francis Burr, Harvard (CW-2; NYP, AFR [as T])
- William Goebel, Yale (WC-3)
- Walter Kreider, Swarthmore (WC-3)

=== Centers ===
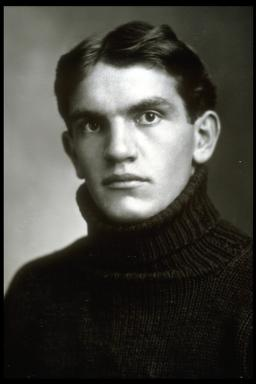
Germany Schulz is credited with inventing the spiral snap and the linebacker position.

- **Germany Schulz**, Michigan (College Football Hall of Fame) (WC-1; CW-2; FY-1; CF)
- **Patrick Grant**, Harvard (WC-2; CW-1; NYW; NYP; CR)
- W. J. Phillips, Princeton (WC-3; NYH)
- Frank Slingluff, Jr., Navy (NYT)
- Stein Stone, Vanderbilt (AFR)

=== Quarterbacks ===
- **Tad Jones**, Yale (WC-1; CW-1; NYH; NYT; NYW; NYP; CF)
- Edward Dillon, Princeton (WC-2; CW-2; FY-1; CR)
- Walter Steffen, Chicago (College Football Hall of Fame) (WC-3)
- Frank Mount Pleasant, Carlisle (AFR)

=== Halfbacks ===
- **Jack Wendell**, Harvard (WC-1; CW-1; NYH; FY-1; CF; CR)
- **Edwin Harlan**, Princeton (WC-1; NYT; NYW; NYP; FY-1, AFR)
- John L. Marks, Dartmouth (WC-2)
- A. H. Douglas, Navy (WC-3 [fb]; CW-2; NYT; CF)
- Bob Folwell, Penn (NYP; CR)
- George Capron, Minnesota (WC-3)
- Edward L. McCallie, Cornell (NYW)
- John Glaze, Dartmouth (AFR)

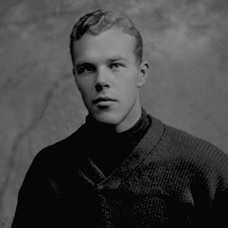
Ted Coy of Yale

=== Fullbacks ===
- **Ted Coy**, Yale (College Football Hall of Fame) (WC-2; CW-1 [hb]; NYH; NYP; FY-1; CF, CR, AFR)
- **Jim McCormick**, Princeton (WC-1; CW-2; NYT; NYW)
- **Peter Hauser**, Carlisle (WC-3 [hb]; CW-1; NYH [hb])
- Bill Hollenback, Penn (College Football Hall of Fame) (WC-2; CW-2)

=== Key ===
NCAA recognized selectors for 1907

- WC = Collier's Weekly as selected by Walter Camp
- CW = Caspar Whitney

Other selectors

- NYH = New York Herald
- NYT = New York Tribune
- NYW = New York World (Robert Edgren)
- NYP = New York Press
- FY = Fielding H. Yost, football coach of the University of Michigan, for the North American Press Syndicate.
- CF = Carl Flanders
- CR = Constant Reader
- AFR = Abilene Semi Weekly Farm Reporter. "selected not according to their weight, but their conception of the new game"

Bold = Consensus All-American

- 1 – First-team selection
- 2 – Second-team selection
- 3 – Third-team selection

== See also ==
- 1907 All-Southern college football team
- 1907 All-Western college football team
