= William Thomas Dunn =

American football player (1881–1962)

William Dunn
Penn State Nittany Lions
- Position: Center / Linebacker
- Class: Graduate

Personal information
- Born: May 13, 1881; Youngstown, Ohio, U.S.
- Died: November 17, 1962 (aged 81); Maui, Hawaii, U.S.

Career information
- College: Penn State (1903–1906)

Awards and highlights
- Consensus All-American (1906)

William Thomas "Mother" Dunn (May 13, 1881 – November 17, 1962) was an American college football player who was a linebacker and center for the Penn State Nittany Lions football team of Penn State University. Dunn captained the 1906 Nittany Lion, and that year became the first player outside of the Ivy League to be selected as an All-American by Walter Camp. He was also the first great linebacker in the history of Penn State's football program, a school that would eventually be nicknamed "Linebacker U" for its history of excellent play at the linebacker position.

Dunn was featured on the official 2011 Nittany Lion football schedule poster as part of the celebration of 125 years of Penn State football.
