= Germany Schulz =

American football player (1883–1951)

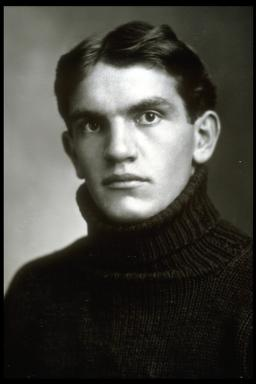
- Schulz at Michigan in 1907

Biographical details
- Born: April 19, 1883; Fort Wayne, Indiana, U.S.
- Died: April 14, 1951 (aged 67); Detroit, Michigan, U.S.

Playing career
- 1904–1905: Michigan
- 1907–1908: Michigan
- Positions: Center, linebacker

Coaching career (HC unless noted)
- 1911–1912: Wisconsin (line)
- 1913–1915: Michigan (chief assistant)
- 1916–1919: Kansas State (assistant)
- 1920: Tulane (line)
- 1923: Detroit

Administrative career (AD unless noted)
- 1916–1919: Kansas State (assistant AD)
- 1920–1921: Tulane

Head coaching record
- Overall: 4–3–2

Accomplishments and honors

Awards
- Consensus All-American (1907); 2× First-team All-Western (1905, 1907); AP All-Time All-American Team (1951); Camp All-time All-America team
- College Football Hall of Fame; Inducted in 1951 (profile)

Adolph George "Germany" Schulz (April 19, 1883 – April 14, 1951) was an All-American American football center for the University of Michigan Wolverines from 1904 to 1905 and from 1907 to 1908. While playing at Michigan, Schulz is credited with having invented the spiral snap and with developing the practice of standing behind the defensive line. As the first lineman to play in back of the line on defense, he is credited as football's first linebacker.

During his time at Michigan, Schulz also became involved in one of college football's earliest recruiting controversies, as some suggested that he was a "ringer" recruited by Michigan coach Fielding H. Yost. Schulz was 21 years old when he enrolled at Michigan and had worked in an Indiana steel mill and reportedly played for either amateur or professional teams. Michigan was refused re-entry into the Western Conference in 1908 when it insisted on playing the 25-year-old Schulz for a fourth season in violation of conference eligibility rules.

Despite the controversies, Schulz is remembered both as an innovator and one of the toughest football players in the early days of the game. In 1951, Schulz was selected as the greatest center in football history in a poll conducted by the National Football Foundation and became one of the initial inductees into the College Football Hall of Fame. He has also been inducted into the Michigan Sports Hall of Fame and the University of Michigan Athletic Hall of Honor.

After his days as a collegiate athlete ended, Schulz assumed a variety of assistant coaching, athletic director, and head coaching positions in college football. He eventually entered the insurance industry, where he enjoyed a long career. He died in 1951, several days after being named the greatest center in football history by the College Football Foundation.

== Childhood ==
Schulz was born in Fort Wayne, Indiana, the son of German immigrants. His father, Adolph F. Schulz Sr., was a doctor who was born in 1854, and his mother, Sophia, was born in 1850. The couple emigrated from Germany to the United States in 1880 with their infant daughter Wilhelmina (born December 1879). Schulz also had two brothers, Fred Schulz and Arthur Schulz, both of whom became doctors. Schulz played football for Fort Wayne High School and was also a member of amateur city teams for several years.

== Star athlete at the University of Michigan ==
=== Concerns that Schulz was a ringer ===
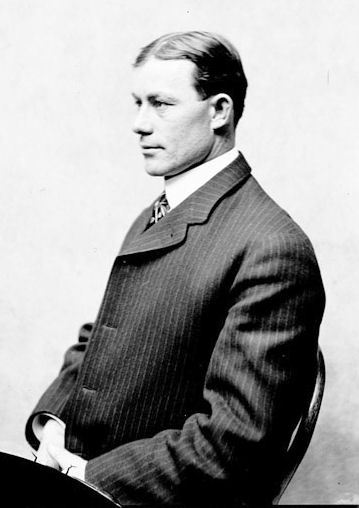
Michigan Wolverines head football coach, Fielding H. Yost

In 1904, Schulz enrolled at the University of Michigan at age 21, standing 6 ft 2 in (1.88 m) and weighing 215 pounds (98 kg; 15 st 5 lb). In the early 1900s, many decried the increasing recruitment of ringers—older, experienced players whose qualifications as "student athletes" were suspect. Michigan's coach, Fielding H. Yost, whose teams outscored their opponents 2,821 to 42 between 1901 and 1905, had been accused of using ringers before. When Yost accepted the head coaching job at Michigan, he had recruited his star player, 23-year-old Willie Heston, to transfer to Michigan from the California State Normal School. When the 21-year-old Schulz joined the team, there were suggestions that he was Yost's newest ringer. The suspicions were exacerbated by reports that Schulz was a factory worker in an Indiana steel mill who had played for a half-dozen professional teams before enrolling at Michigan.

Until the time of his death, reports of his having been a ringer angered Schulz. While he did work in a steel mill, Schulz insisted that he did not "come out" of the steel mill to play football. Instead, Schulz said he "went into" the mill to harden himself up for the football season. When asked years later how he got to Michigan, Schulz recalled that, in the summer of 1904, he was working in the mill and had received several offers to play football. One day, his father called to say that Fielding Yost of Michigan was in his office. Schulz ran down the street and rushed into his father's office, where he was introduced to Yost. His father promptly told him, "Adolph, this is Mr. Yost. You are to play football for him at Michigan. We have made all the arrangements".

In September 1904, on his way to Ann Arbor, Michigan (the home of the University of Michigan), Schulz recalled that he stopped in Chicago, Illinois, where he spent four days drinking beer and generally having a "swell time". A group of Michigan representatives eventually found him in Chicago and put him on the next train to Ann Arbor. When he arrived in Ann Arbor, Yost was furious and accused Schulz of flirting with Amos Alonzo Stagg, the legendary coach of the University of Chicago. Schulz was immediately taken out to Michigan's training camp at Whitmore Lake and kept asking Yost when he was going to be allowed to register. Yost told Schulz that he had taken care of it. According to Schulz, he was registered two weeks before he ever saw the campus.

Yost's account differed dramatically from that of Schulz. Sensitive to allegations that he was recruiting ringers, Yost denied having recruited Schulz and claimed that Schulz was just another student who tried out for the team. According to Yost, the first time he ever saw Schulz was in the fall of 1904 when Schulz was waiting tables at a fraternity house in Ann Arbor and told Yost he would like to play football. Yost went so far as to say that he initially thought the young waiter looked too awkward to be a football player, but "did not want to discourage anybody".

=== Freshman year: Michigan's undefeated season ===
Schulz was the only freshman to play on Michigan's 1904 football team. The team featured the school's all-time scoring leader, Willie Heston, finished with a record of 10–0, and outscored opponents 567–22. Schulz started all ten games for the 1904 team.

Schulz began his playing career at Michigan as a guard, starting five games at that position. However, midway through the season, Yost moved Schulz to center, where he started the remaining five games. Schulz's play at center was reported to have been "gilt-edged", and his accuracy in snapping the ball was praised by the team's quarterback, Fred Norcross. Six games into the season, Schulz's hometown newspaper reported on Schulz's accomplishments under the headline: "Makes Good at Michigan". The article noted: "Schulz went to Ann Arbor practically green at the game, but by hard and consistent work he has succeeded in winning a place on the greatest team in America, and is the only freshman out of fifty who was able to do so".

Schulz was one of the larger football players of his time and was known as a fierce hitter. Schulz liked to tell a story about an incident during Michigan's 1904 game against Oberlin College. He recalled: "We were playing Oberlin in 1904. Their regular center was hurt and a little 155-pound fellow came in. I hit him as hard as I could. Imagine my surprise when he looked up and said, 'please sir, if you are determined to be fierce, let me know and I'll get out of the way.' I was no good the rest of the afternoon. Every time I looked at the little fellow, I had to break out laughing".

=== 1905 season: Stardom ===
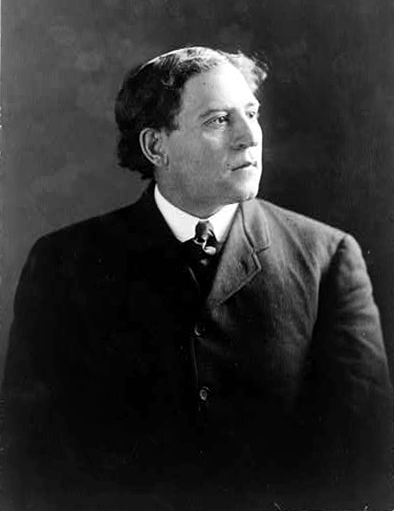
Amos Alonzo Stagg

Before the 1905 season got underway, Schulz contracted malaria in the spring. Newspapers reported it was a "serious attack" and that he "has been quite ill", but he was able to recuperate before the 1905 football season. In October 1905, Coach Yost said: "In looking over the whole bunch, I do not see anyone who has improved more than Schulz. He is bigger and stronger than ever, and I do not know a man in the world that has it the least bit over him in the center position. I would not trade him for any other center rush in the country today. He looks good to me for the All-America team right now". Though he was not selected for the All-America team in 1905, Schulz did receive All-Western honors.

=== Innovations: The "spiral snap" and the "roving center" ===
Schulz is widely credited with two important innovations in the development of the modern game of American football. First, he is credited with having invented the spiral snap. Before Schulz, centers passed the ball to one of the backs in an end-over-end manner.

Second, Schulz is credited with being the first center to step back from the line while playing defense. Prior to Schulz's innovation, centers played in the line on defense. In 1905, Schulz began dropping back from the line, enabling him to use his speed to move laterally and giving him greater coverage across the field of play. At the time, the innovation was referred to as a "roving center", but it was effectively the birth of the linebacker position in American football. Asked how he developed the "roving center" idea, Schulz noted that the backs started from five yards behind the line and concluded, "No back living could move five yards while I was moving four". He described his thinking to Coach Yost this way: "It's all very simple, Yost. The ball carrier travels five yards while I travel only four yard to meet him. I know of no back who can beat me in a five-yard race after giving me a one-yard handicap".

In 1954, sports columnist Dave Lewis explored the history of the linebacker position, and concluded that Schulz was the "first of the breed". Lewis wrote: "Schulz revolutionized defensive line play being the first to back up the line".

Schulz recalled that the first time he stepped back from the line on defense, Coach Yost was horrified. Yost said, "Dutchman, what are you trying to do?" "Stop 'em", replied Schulz. "But you're supposed to play in the line", Yost insisted. "They'll run over us." "Listen Yost", Schulz claims to have said, "My way is best. If any of 'em gets by me, I'll move back into the line and stay there". Yost eventually saw the wisdom in Schulz's technique, and soon nearly all centers were backing up the line on defense.

=== Ineligibility for the 1906 season ===
Schulz's promising football career took a detour in 1906. Some sources indicate that Schulz missed the 1906 season for financial reasons. Schulz's official biography at the College Football Hall of Fame states: "He missed the 1906 season; he had dropped out of school because of a lack of funds. He worked in a steel mill in Fort Wayne, Indiana, and earned the money to return to college". In fact, Schulz's father was a successful doctor, and contemporary reports indicate that Schulz was ineligible to play in 1906 for academic reasons. In February 1906, one paper reported that Schulz had been "dropped from the rolls on account of poor work during the semester". Another report in March 1906 indicated that Schulz had left the university "by desire of the faculty" after he fell behind in his studies. In September 1906, The Washington Post reported that Schulz's academic problems continued to render him ineligible to play.

=== All-American in 1907 ===
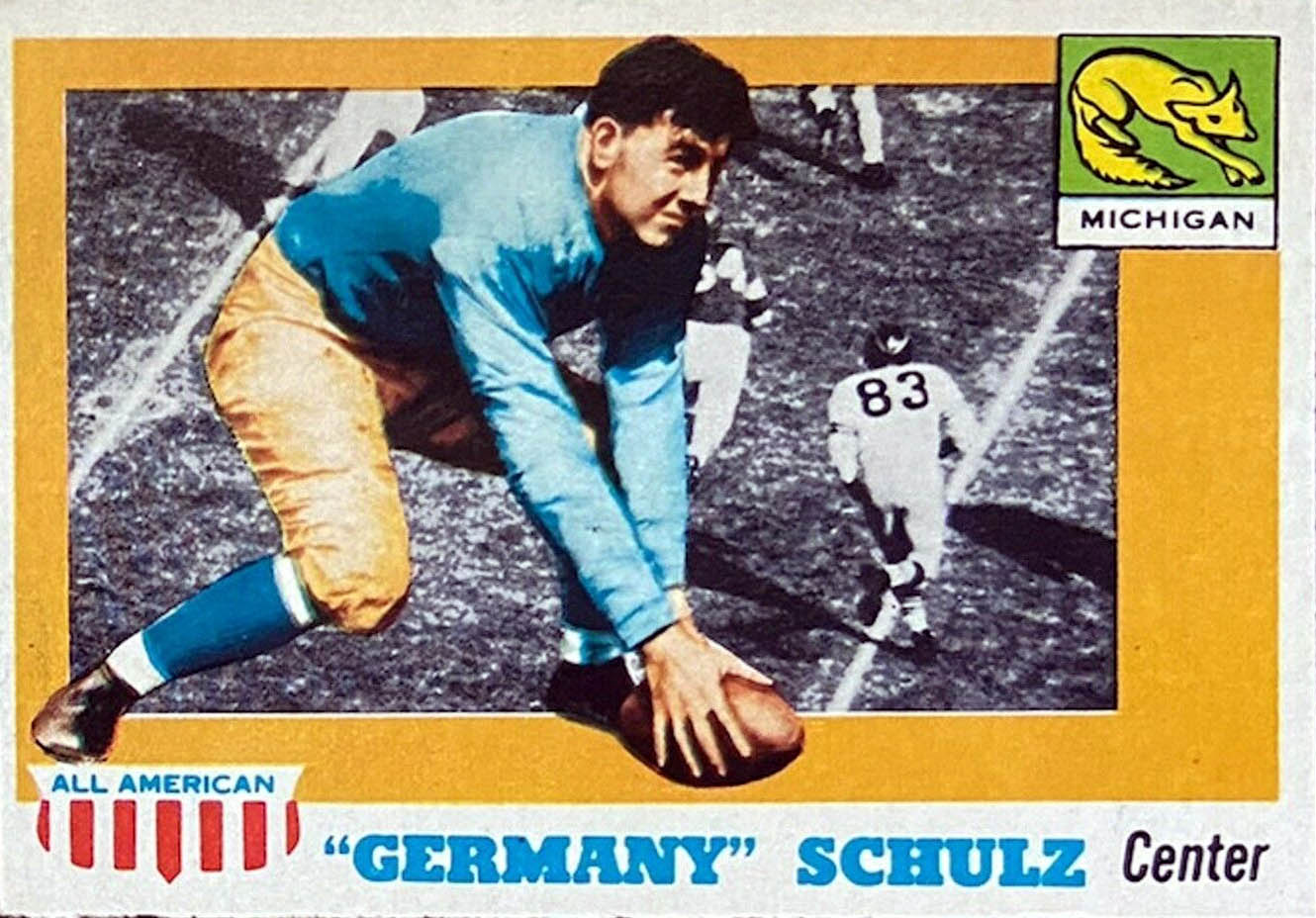
Schulz depicted on a football card, c. 1955

When Schulz returned to the team in 1907, he was the talk of the campus. One newspaper reported that Ann Arbor had "5,000 students continually gossiping about him", as Schulz's return was seen as "a gigantic stride in the direction of (Michigan's) winning back her former football prestige". Coach Yost noted: "We need him not only as a player, but also as a leader. In energy, ability to stand hard knocks, and courage he is a model for the rest of the team to strive after". With Schulz in the lineup, Michigan won its first five games by a combined score of 107–0. In Michigan's game against Ohio State, Schulz was reported to have been "a brick wall of defense" and "hard as nails".

After starting the season 5–0, Michigan closed the 1907 season playing the University of Pennsylvania. For the first time, one of the eastern schools had agreed to play a game at Ferry Field in Ann Arbor. In the buildup to the game, the press focused on Schulz as the key to Michigan's chances. One writer noted: "There is one man in the Michigan eleven that Pennsylvania fears and will endeavor to stop if possible when the two great teams meet in Ann Arbor November 16, 1907. That man is Germany Schulz, Yost's great center". Penn even announced that they were moving their star tackle, Draper, to center in an effort to stop Schulz. In the end, Penn beat Michigan, 6–0, marking the first time the Wolverines had ever lost a game at Ferry Field.

Despite the loss, press reports after the game credited Schulz with a great effort. One account noted: "Pennsy is said to have delegated three players to watch him, the heavyweight center played a star game throughout. He broke through the line repeatedly and stopped plays. Then again he would dash out to the end and tackle the man attempting to circle the wing. He was down under punts and in the open play showed as much speed as any player on the field. And he weighs 234 pounds".

At the end of the season, there was a consensus that "The giant center of Michigan practically stands in a class by himself at the pivot position". University of Chicago star Walter Eckersall, said: "Schulz, of Michigan, easily outshone his opponents in every game. He is finely built, runs fast, snaps accurately, tackles hard, and is all over the field in every play". One writer referred to Schulz in 1907 as a "human catapult" and said: "Schulz of Michigan is a very heavy man, weighing over 200 pounds, yet he is strikingly fast on his feet and is unusual on that account. He propels his massive frame at a speed that terrifies opponents. . . . The acknowledged prowess of Schulz makes him an especial object of unfair attack in scrimmages by opponents who hope, by disabling him, to weaken the Michigan team".

Coach Yost added: "Schultz is without doubt the best center in the country. In fact, Schulz is the best man in the middle of the line I have ever seen in all my football experience". In naming Schulz to his All-America team, Walter Camp said: "He is well over six feet in height, yet a fast, powerful man who gets well over the field and makes more tackles in a game than any other man on his team. In addition he is an accurate passer and feeds the ball well to his backs either for kicks or runs".

=== Controversy over eligibility for 1908 ===
As the 1907 season ended, a controversy was sparked when the Michigan players unanimously voted Schulz as the captain for the 1908 season. Michigan had been suspended by the Western Conference after the 1906 season, and if it was to seek readmission in 1908, it was required to comply with Western Conference eligibility rules. Under those rules, a player was limited to three years of play, though Michigan's rule allowed a player four years of eligibility. Michigan officials contended that Schulz should not be governed by the rule, because he had begun play before the conference's rule was enacted.

Schulz found himself in the middle of football's first eligibility controversy. At the same time, David Starr Jordan, the President of Stanford University, made a speech referring to modern college football as "unethical", "unchristian", "unsportsmanlike" and "a monstrosity". Starr noted that "practically all the major universities employ questionable methods in securing athletes". Jordan heaped particular scorn on Michigan, where he claimed "the alumni and cheap gamblers of the town brought in men who were professionals and paid them salaries to play on Michigan athlete teams". The New York Times ran a front-page story repeating Jordan's charges.

The Western Conference's eligibility rules had been at the center of Michigan's dispute with the conference for more than a year. Unlike the Western Conference, the eastern schools had looser eligibility standards, and it was "generally conceded that playing under [the Western Conference's] strict eligibility rules Michigan is at a big disadvantage in games with eastern colleges, where, to say the least, the lines are not so clearly drawn".

Schulz complained amid the controversy about inaccurate reporting of his age. "As a rule my age is generally given as twenty-five, when in fact I am but twenty-three." Schulz would have been 24 at the time of his comments.

Michigan presented its case for Schulz to a meeting of the "Big Nine" in Chicago. One account noted: "The Michigan case will be discussed at the meeting and it is very likely that a vote requesting the Ann Arbor institution to withdraw from the body will be passed. Michigan's open violation of the conference rules during the last year has aroused a strong hostile spirit, and it is known that a majority of the schools favor dropping the Wolverines from the association". Manager Charles Baird was given the task of arguing Schulz's case to the Conference at its January meeting.

The student newspaper, The Michigan Daily, urged the school not to abandon Schulz. It wrote: "Germany Schulz is now recognized as the captain of Michigan's next football team . . ., and while Michigan students are not averse to going back into active alliance with the western schools, any attempt to debar Schulz from his fairly won honor is sure to cause an uproar, which may upset all of the feeling of compromise which is now evident". Ultimately, the Western Conference forced Michigan to choose between Schulz or the conference. Michigan chose Schulz, and the Big Nine remained the Big Eight for the 1908 season.

=== 1908 season and further academic eligibility problems ===
After a strong show of support from the university, Schulz ran into further academic problems. In February 1908, the university announced that Schulz was ineligible for the track team (Schulz competed in the shot put and the discus) due to his performance on a semester exam in hydraulics. While he would be allowed to get his work straightened out before it came time to compete in football, news accounts noted that "the outlook is rather gloomy at present".

By the time football season arrived, Schulz's academic problems had worsened. Contemporary reports indicated that "It is not physical conditions which are keeping the giant player from the game (as was announced), but educational ones". In early October 1908, Schulz had "three conditions in the engineering course, more than a player can carry and continue his athletic relations". Though "every effort" had been made for two weeks to have the conditions removed, those efforts had failed. A meeting of the eligibility board was held, and they concluded that Schulz could not play until he removed at least two of the conditions. While it was possible for Schulz to remove the conditions by the end of October by "burning the midnight oil", it was reported that "this is an optimistic view of the situation shared by few".

Schulz ultimately had his eligibility restored in late October and was greeted with "cheers from the bleachers" when he appeared in his first practice on October 22, 1908. It appears that Schulz's academic problems continued, as a 1910 article concerning the post-college success of football players reported that Schulz "didn't finish" his course at Michigan.

=== 1908 Penn game ===
In 1908, Michigan went into its rivalry game against Penn undefeated. Michigan hoped to avenge two straight defeats to the Quakers, and its hopes were based to a large extent on Schulz. Penn announced before the game that it would bring four available centers so there "might be a fresh antagonist facing the Michigan captain throughout the game". Special trains from all over Michigan poured large crowds into Ann Arbor, and the crowd was said to be "the largest attendance which has been on Ferry Field". Though Michigan was beaten that day, 29–0, Schulz's courageous performance, and the pummeling he took from the Penn team, was recounted many times in the following decades. Not all of these accounts are consistent with each other, but the story of the Penn game has become an integral part of the Germany Schulz hagiography.

In one of the few contemporaneous accounts, the Toledo Blade wrote that the Penn players, knowing that Schulz was "the power in the Michigan game", focused their energy on wearing him down. There were two Penn players who "did nothing but look after Schultz". And they did more than look: "In every scrimmage, he was bumped as hard as the rules allowed, and maybe a little harder, when nobody was looking. ... Every time Schultz started anywhere he would find a couple of Penn men digging headfirst into his stomach. They would elbow him, jam him with the straight arm, and if he went to the ground in a scrimmage there generally would be a knee grinding him in the wind. Pretty soon Schultz began to show it. ... He limped along pitifully. He couldn't run. His strength was almost gone. When he did tackle, his groan of pain could almost be heard in the stands". But the fans continued to urge Schulz with yells of "G-r-r-r-r-rah, Schultz!" Schulz buckled down and continued to play, and the pummeling continued.

At half-time, the trainers found on Schulz "a mass of black and blue spots". His "face was distorted with bumps", and there were "welts on his back and groin". As the second half started, Schulz insisted he felt better and went back into the game. But the attack continued. "Another scrimmage and two more Penn men were after him again. He went into the play and for an instant, his strength came back, but it couldn't last, and it didn't." Yost finally sent in a substitute, and Schulz limped to the sideline and walked slowly away "with head bowed and hands to his stomach". And when the "rubbers" removed his togs and examined him, "they marveled that he was able to walk". In the end, Schulz "didn't say a word—big tears rolled down as he lay there; Schultz was thoroughly beaten, but it took the entire Pennsylvania eleven to do it".

Penn's captain, Bill Hollenback, said: "This fellow Schulz is a monster in size and a perfect athlete. He is both wonderfully agile and fast for a man of his size. In our game with Michigan, we had two men instructed to play against Schulz and at times three and four were opposed to him. For some time, he handed out as much as we passed to him in the roughing end of the game. He was here, there and everywhere. He did most of the tackling. He broke up innumerable plays. He was the star of the contest until the continued battering of our men injured him to such an extent that he had to retire. The rest was easy". Coach Yost said of Schulz's performance: "He gave the greatest one-man exhibition of courage I ever saw on a football field".

From the 1920s through the 1950s, the story was told, re-told and likely embellished in columns by Grantland Rice, Art Carlson, Frank Blair and Dave Lewis—more than one of them writing that they had seen the game in person. In Carlson's 1925 account, "the giant center had been rendered practically useless from the Penn attack", but refused to leave the game. Carlson recalled Schulz's removal from the game this way: "It was a scene I shall never forget—the giant Schulz, towering above the rest of the combatants, literally dragged off the field, tears streaming down his mud-spattered cheeks as he frantically protested his removal from the game".

In 1942, Grantland Rice wrote that Schulz held the Penn team in check for 50 minutes and that the score was 0–0 when Schulz "left the field a battered wreck". (In fact, contemporaneous accounts show the score was 6–0 at halftime.)

In Frank Blair's 1951 telling, Schulz played with the "strength of Samson", and Penn "put five men – center, both guards and both tackles—on the Wolverine giant". According to Blair, who claimed to have attended the game as a high school student, Schulz played like a madman, making nearly all the tackles for 50 minutes, and Penn was held scoreless until Schulz was "carried from the field".

In a 1954 article, sports writer Dave Lewis wrote that Penn assigned five players to the task of mowing down Schulz. Lewis quoted Schulz as having said: "I can still see those five pairs of eyes staring at me every time we lined up . . . ready to tear me apart". According to Lewis, all five men piled on Schulz every play, and Schulz held Penn scoreless for 50 minutes before they "finally knocked him out". Lewis concluded: "Never before or since has there been such a one-man show of defensive football as Schulz displayed against Penn".

A few months before his death, Schulz told Detroit News sports writer H. G. Salsinger that he had only one regret: "I wish I could have lasted 10 minutes longer. That was one game I wanted to finish".

=== Awards and accolades ===
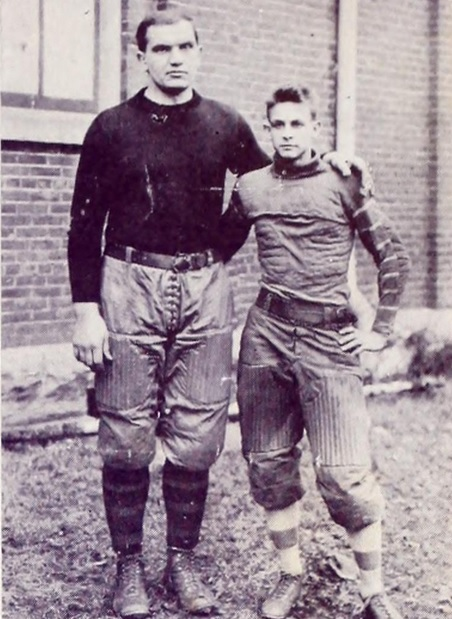
Germany Schulz next to Sewanee quarterback Chigger Browne, showing his great size and Browne's small size.

In January 1910, Walter Camp published his All-Time All-American list in Century magazine, selecting the best player at each position over the 20 years he had been watching college football. He selected Schulz as his center, the first of many such All-Time All-American selections for Schulz. At the time, Camp said: "Big, strong and fast, he combined all the defensive and offensive qualities of the best line men with the speed, sure tackling and intuition as to what to do on the instant that are winning qualities of the defensive back. In addition, his passing was excellent, as he had plenty of speed for his kicker, steadiness for his quarter, and ability to pass in directions other than in a straight line which made him especially valuable in certain formation plays".

In 1949, Grantland Rice chose him as the center for his All-Time All-American team. At the time, Rice said: "Schulz was 6 feet 4 and he weighed 245 pounds. He was as fast as a good halfback. I have never seen a center who was his equal at backing up a line and then protecting both flanks. He was a terrific tackler".

In 1951, the College Football Foundation commissioned the Associated Press to conduct a poll of more than 100 sports editors to choose an All-Time All-American team. Those chosen would be the initial inductees into the new College Football Hall of Fame. Schulz won the great majority of the votes at center and thus became one of the initial inductees into the College Football Hall of Fame. In announcing the selection, the Associated Press said: "Schulz was a giant of a man—six feet five and 285 pounds—with tremendous ham-like hands that worked to his advantage in that era of mass formations when ground was gained on brute strength alone". On being told of his selection, Schulz, who died ten days later, said he was honored and noted: "I haven't missed one of those teams yet".

He was inducted into the Michigan Sports Hall of Fame in 1960. He was also posthumously inducted into the University of Michigan Athletic Hall of Honor in 1979.

In 1969, in honor of the centennial of collegiate football, the Football Writers Association of America named two "College Football All-Time Teams" of eleven players — an "early" team consisting of players who played prior to 1920, and a "modern" team who played in 1920 and after. Schulz was selected for center of the pre-1920 squad.

In 2004, he was selected as one of the top fifteen football players in U-M history in 2004 by The Michigan Daily.

== Professional football in the Tri-State league ==
In 1909 and 1910, Schulz played briefly in the infant Tri-State professional football league operating in Ohio, Illinois and Pennsylvania. He played for the Dayton Oakwoods team. His first game with the Oakwoods was on Thanksgiving 1909. In that game, the Oakwoods defeated the Pittsburgh Lyceum, which had gone undefeated for three seasons and was considered the top professional team of its era.

At the time of the 1910 United States census, Schulz was listed as residing with his parents in Fort Wayne, and his occupation was listed as being an engineer with an electric works.

The Oakwoods made Schulz an offer to return in 1910 as the team's captain, but contemporaneous press accounts indicate he was weighing the remuneration to be paid by the Oakwoods against his steady job at the Fort Wayne Electric works. Though some accounts indicate that he ultimately accepted the Oakwoods' offer, official records of play have not been located to determine whether Schulz actually played for the Oakwoods in 1910. In December 1910, Schulz did play on an all-star team against the All-Harvard club in a game in Memphis, Tennessee, for the benefit of the United Charities association.

== College football coach and athletic director ==
=== University of Wisconsin ===
In 1911 and 1912, Schulz worked as the line coach for the University of Wisconsin. After two years, he resigned to accept the management of an automobile concern in Fort Wayne.

=== University of Michigan ===
Schulz returned to coaching in 1913 as the line coach and chief assistant coach for Fielding H. Yost at Michigan. He held that position for three seasons from 1913 to 1915. While working as an assistant coach at Michigan, Schulz has been credited with introducing the technique of overshifting a lineman on defense. In 1913, Schulz developed a new blocking technique by shifting one of the linemen. Coach Yost was unconvinced until Schulz performed a demonstration using Michigan's left guard Royce Traphagen. Schulz first put Traphagen in the line position designated by Yost, Schulz lined up on the other side of the line and charged, "almost wrecking Traphagen". Then, Schulz had the groggy Traphagen line up in the spot designated by Schulz, and when Schulz charged he missed. Schulz implemented the overshift technique during the 1913 season.

In late November 1915, Schulz's mother, Sophia Schulz, died at age 65. Two days after her death, Schulz announced that he was withdrawing from the Michigan coaching staff, though it was noted at the time that several Midwestern universities were working to get Schulz as their head coach.

In January 1916, the Fort Wayne Sentinel reported that Schulz was back to work at his old position in the general testing room at the Fort Wayne Electric works, after an absence of two years.

=== Kansas State ===
In September 1916, Schulz returned to coaching as the assistant athletic director at Kansas State Agricultural College, now known as Kansas State University. Schulz spent four years in Manhattan, Kansas, working as an assistant under head coach Zora G. Clevenger. When Kansas State beat Southwestern 53–0, the Fort Wayne paper ran a story: "Germany's Team Wins." During the first three years under Schulz and Clevenger, the Wildcats went 16–4–1 and outscored their opponents 464–90. However, in 1919, Kansas State gave up 109 points (more than in the three prior seasons combined) and finished with a 3–5–1. Schulz announced his resignation in January 1920.

In a draft registration card completed in September 1918, Schulz identified his occupation as an athletic coach for the Kansas Agricultural College at Manhattan, Kansas. During World War I, Schulz also served as the athletic director at Fort Riley in Kansas. He was assigned to direct athletic exercises for the men serving at the camp. At the time of the 1920 United States census, Schulz was listed as an athletic coach living in Manhattan, Kansas.

=== Tulane University ===
In August 1920, Schulz was hired by Tulane University in New Orleans, Louisiana, as the director of the school's new "department of physical education". Reporters took note of Schulz's size when he arrived in New Orleans: "It is a fortunate thing for all concerned that Schulz has taken up the more peaceful pursuit of physical director. It is a stroke of good fortune for Tulane and her athletes that the athletic council was able to land a big man like Schulz". Though he served as the school's athletic director, Schulz also chose to take charge of the linemen during football season, working alongside football coach Clark Shaughnessy. In 1920, Schulz arranged for the Tulane football team to play Michigan as part of the most extensive trip made to that point by a southern football team. Schulz's team faced off against Coach Yost and the Wolverines on October 30, 1920, and were shut out, 21–0.

=== University of Detroit ===
In December 1922, Schulz was hired as head football coach at the University of Detroit. Shortly after his appointment, Schulz announced that he was looking for "eleven raving maniacs" to fill out his team, a phrase that was picked up in wire service reports around the country. He noted: "You can't beat eleven raving maniacs with football heads". In September 1923, the press reported that Schulz suffered a shoulder injury while demonstrating proper tackling technique on a tackling dummy. After going 39–7 in the five seasons before Schulz took over, the Detroit team fell to 4–3–2 in 1923. In January 1924, the university announced that it would not renew Schulz's contract, and Schulz announced his "permanent retirement from football coaching".

== Later life ==
Schulz worked in the insurance business, including as a state agent for The Medical Protective Company in Michigan, from 1924 until his death in 1951. After retiring from football in the early 1920s, Schulz led a private life, and little has been written about the last 30 years of his life. At the time of the 1930 United States census, Schulz was living in Grand Rapids, Michigan, with his wife, Emilie V. Schulz (age 35), his mother-in-law, Emilie V. Sabovian (age 82), and his sister-in-law, Louise Sabovian. His occupation was listed in the 1930 Census as an insurance salesman.

Schulz died in 1951, less than two weeks after being selected as the center on the All-Time All-American Team. Schulz had undergone an operation for a "malignant ulcer of the stomach" in February 1951 and suffered a relapse in April. He died at Detroit's Henry Ford Hospital at age 67.

== Head coaching record ==
Year	Team	Overall	Conference	Standing	Bowl/playoffs
Detroit Titans (Independent) (1923)
1923	Detroit	4–3–2			
Detroit College:		4–3–2			
Total:		4–3–2			

== See also ==
- List of Michigan Wolverines football All-Americans
- University of Michigan Athletic Hall of Honor
