= Clarence Hockenberger =

American football player (1885–1923)

Profile
- Position: Center

Personal information
- Born: February 6, 1885; Union Hill, New York, U.S.
- Died: October 29, 1923 (aged 38); Cape Girardeau, Missouri, U.S.

Career information
- College: Yale

Career history
- 1905–1906: Yale University

Awards and highlights
- Second-team All-American (1906)

Clarence William Hockenberger (February 6, 1885 – October 29, 1923) was an American football player. He played at the center position for Yale University in 1905 and 1906. He first-team honors on the 1906 All-America college football team by The New York Times, New York World, New York Sun, and New York Mail. Hockenberger played football at Andover before enrolling at Yale.

After leaving Yale, Hockenberger lived in Rochester, New York, and became a successful lumberman. While visiting Cape Girardeau, Missouri to build a mill, he became ill and died of peritonitis at age 38 after undergoing an operation.
