= Jim McCormick (American football) =

American football player and coach (1884–1959)

Biographical details
- Born: March 21, 1884; Boston, Massachusetts, U.S.
- Died: August 18, 1959 (aged 75); Duxbury, Massachusetts, U.S.

Playing career
- 1904–1907: Princeton
- Position: Fullback

Coaching career (HC unless noted)
- 1909: Princeton

Head coaching record
- Overall: 6–2–1

Accomplishments and honors

Championships
- National (1906)

Awards
- 2× consensus All-American (1905, 1907); Second-team All-American (1906)
- College Football Hall of Fame; Inducted in 1954 (profile)

James B. McCormick (March 21, 1884 – September 18, 1959) was an American college football player and coach. He played as a fullback at Princeton University from 1904 to 1907. McCormick was the head football coach at Princeton in 1909, tallying a mark of 6–2–1. He was inducted into the College Football Hall of Fame as a player in 1954. McCormick served as an officer in the United States Marine Corps during World War I.

== Head coaching record ==
Year	Team	Overall	Conference	Standing	Bowl/playoffs
Princeton Tigers (Independent) (1909)
1909	Princeton	6–2–1			
Princeton:		6–2–1			
Total:		6–2–1			
