= Paul Veeder =

American football player (1885-1942)

Yale Bulldogs
- Position: Running back

Personal information
- Born: June 5, 1884; Chicago, Illinois, U.S.
- Died: March 10, 1942 (aged 57); New York, New York, U.S.

Career information
- College: Yale (1904–1906)

Awards and highlights
- Consensus All-American (1906)

Paul Lansing Veeder (June 5, 1884 – March 10, 1942) was an All-American football player for Yale University. Veeder played halfback, fullback, quarterback and punter for the Yale Bulldogs from 1904–1906 and was selected as an All-American in 1906.

== Biography ==
A native of Chicago, Illinois, Veeder attended the Latin School of Chicago. He left Chicago to enroll at Phillips Academy in Andover, Massachusetts, where he was quarterback of the school's 1903 football team.

Veeder enrolled at Yale in the fall of 1903. He played for Yale's football team from 1904 to 1906. Veeder was 5 feet, 10 inches in height and weighed 167 pounds. He played mostly at halfback, but also quarterback and fullback. He also handled punting and place kicking for Yale. A November 1904 article in The Philadelphia Inquirer noted that Veeder averaged 50 yards per punt. He was also considered an excellent defensive back, with coaches rating him as "a capital man to bore through an opposing line." Veeder also played baseball as a pitcher at Yale, and in March 1907, the Sporting Life noted: "He is said to possess good curves and speed and good control."

In April 1905, The Washington Post reported that Veeder won the first prize for punting at the annual Yale kicking contest with a total of 175 points. In 1904, the Trenton Times reported that "the fleet quarter and half back" had missed the Princeton game after becoming involved in "a slight scholarship complication," but the matter was closed in time for him to play in the Harvard game.

In the 1906 college football season, the forward pass was introduced to the game of football. The first legal forward pass has been credited to Bradbury Robinson of St. Louis University, but some publications say the "first forward pass in a major game" was thrown by Veeder in the Yale-Harvard game on November 24, 1906. Veeder helped Yale defeat Harvard 6-0 in front of a crowd of 32,000 at New Haven. In a game that commentators noted was unlike any game played before, Yale relied heavily on the newly permitted forward pass, and Veeder completed a 30-yard pass to Harvard's 3-yard line for a first down. The completion led to Yale's only touchdown. In 2007, The Washington Post identified Veeder's 30-yard pass as one of the few significant forward passes thrown in the first season of the forward pass.

The famous Chicago football expert Walter Eckersall later wrote that Veeder was one of the finest football players to come from Chicago:

"Of the recent players who have made names for themselves on Eastern College teams none is so conspicuous as Paul Veeder. This remarkable football player is a product of the Chicago Latin School. He went to Yale at the conclusion of his prep course, and after two years of hard work finally managed to make the team. He was placed at full back and was pronounced by Walter Camp as one of the best backs that ever represented Yale on the gridiron and as proof of his conviction Camp placed him on the All American team."

At the end of the 1906 season, Veeder announced he would return to Yale for another season of varsity football player, and one Washington newspaper called him Yale's "star punter and half back."

Veeder graduated from Yale's Sheffield Scientific School in June 1907. He returned in the fall of that year as an academic student and became the coach of Yale's backs. In November 1907, The New York Times wrote about Veeder's innovations with the newly developed "on-side kick" play:

"Veeder ran off a new on-side kick which is one of the novelties of revised football for 1907. His idea is to make a drop kick, booting the top instead of the bottom of the ball, driving the oval low over or into the line, and putting every one on side. He worked the kick so cleverly that in nearly every case the scrubs retained possession of the ball."

This strategy had been used by St. Louis coach Eddie Cochems and perhaps others the previous season.

Veeder remained a part of Yale's coaching staff at least through the 1909 and 1911 seasons.
