= Patrick Grant (American football) =

American football player (1886–1927)

Harvard Crimson
- Position: Center

Personal information
- Born: April 30, 1886; Boston, Massachusetts, U.S.
- Died: October 28, 1927 (age 39); Philadelphia, Pennsylvania, U.S.

Career information
- College: Harvard (1907)

Awards and highlights
- Consensus All-American (1907)

Patrick Grant II (April 30, 1886 – October 28, 1927) was an American football player. He played college football at Harvard University and was a consensus first-team selection to the 1907 College Football All-America Team.

Grant was born in 1886 at Boston, Massachusetts. His parents were Robert Grant, Boston probate judge, and Amy Gordon Galt.

Grant enrolled at Harvard University where he played on the Harvard Crimson football team. After the 1907 season, he was selected as a consensus first-team center on the 1907 College Football All-America Team. He graduated from Harvard in 1908.

In 1912, Grant ran an aviation school at Seabreeze, Florida. While in Florida, he became engaged to Marie S. Disston. The two were married in September 1912. They had a daughter in approximately 1916. Grant served with the Royal Canadian Flying Corps and won an amateur golf tournament in 1919.

In the 1920s, Grant managed the statistical department at the banking firm of Townsend, Whelen & Co. in Philadelphia. He died in October 1927 at age 39 when he fell from the window of his office on the fifth floor of an office building on Walnut Street in Philadelphia.
