= A. H. Douglas =

American athlete and war veteran (1885–1972)

Profile
- Position: Running back

Personal information
- Born: February 8, 1885; Bennettsville, South Carolina, U.S.
- Died: December 21, 1972 (aged 87); Newport, Rhode Island, U.S.

Career information
- College: Tennessee (1902); Navy (1904–1907)

Awards and highlights
- Second-team All-American (1905); Third-team All-American (1907); All-Southern (1902); Thompson Trophy Cup (1908); Navy Athletics Hall of Fame; 1932 All-time Navy football 1st team; 1950 All-time Navy football 3rd team

Archibald Hugh Douglas (February 8, 1885 – December 12, 1972), nicknamed "Toots" and "Tootsie", was an American college football and baseball player and a distinguished veteran of World War II. He once commanded the aircraft carrier USS Saratoga. He also served in World War I, as part of the Northern Bombing Group.

== Early life ==
Douglas was born on February 8, 1885, in Bennettsville, South Carolina, but grew up in Knoxville, Tennessee, the son of Archibald J. Douglas and Nan Harlan.

== University of Tennessee ==
=== Football ===
Douglas was once a prominent running back for the Tennessee Volunteers football teams of the University of Tennessee.

==== 1902 ====
The 1902 Volunteers won a school record six games and beat rivals Sewanee and Georgia Tech. 1902 was also the first time that Tennessee scored on Vanderbilt in their Rivalry game. The team closed the season with an 11 to 0 loss to John Heisman's Clemson Tigers. Douglas holds the record for the longest punt in school history when he punted a ball 109 yards (the field length was 110 yards in those days) during the Clemson game. Heisman described the kick:

The day was bitterly cold and a veritable typhoon was blowing straight down the field from one end to the other. We rushed the ball with more consistency than Tennessee, but throughout the entire first half they held us because of the superb punting of "Toots" Douglas, especially because, in that period he had the gale squarely with him. Going against that blizzard our labors were like unto those of Tantalus. Slowly, with infinite pains and a maximum of exertion, we pushed the ball from our territory to their 10-yard line. We figured we had another down to draw on, but the referee begged to differ. He handed the ball to Tennessee and the "tornado." Their general cheerfully chirped a signal – Saxe Crawford, it must have been –; and "Toots" with sprightly step, dropped back for another of his Milky Way punts. I visualize him still, standing on his own goal line and squarely between his uprights. One quick glance he cast overhead– no doubt to make sure that howling was still the same old hurricane. I knew at once what he proposed to do. The snap was perfect. "Toots" caught the ball, took two smart steps and – BLAM!–away shot the ball as though from the throat of Big Bertha. And, say, in his palmiest mathematical mood, I don't believe Sir Isaac Newton himself could have figured a more perfect trajectory to fit with that cyclone. Onward and upward, upward and onward, the crazy thing flew like a brainchild of Jules Verne. I thought it would clear the Blue Ridge Mountains. Our safety man, the great Johnny Maxwell, was positioned 50 yards behind our rush line, yet the punt sailed over his head like a phantom aeroplane. Finally, it came down, but still uncured of its wanderlust it started in to roll–toward our goal, of course, with Maxwell chasing and damning it with every step and breath. Finally it curled up and died on our one-footline, after a bowstring journey of just 109 yards.

In the loss to Vanderbilt, Tennessee's only score was provided by an A. H. Douglas run around right end, breaking two tackles and getting the touchdown. Douglas was selected All-Southern. Nash Buckingham and Sax Crawford were teammates of his.

== Naval Academy ==
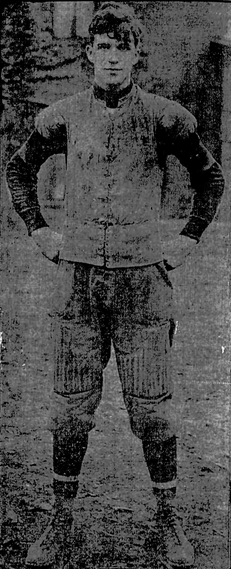
A. H. Douglas

=== Football ===
Douglas then played for the Navy Midshipmen from 1904 to 1907, a teammate of Bill Dague.

==== 1905 ====
Douglas made the tying score in the Army–Navy Game of 1905.

==== 1907 ====
He was captain of the team in 1907. He was selected a third-team All-American by Walter Camp and a first-team All-American by the New York Tribune. Captain Douglas called the tie to Vanderbilt "the bitterest pill I have ever had to swallow."

=== Baseball ===
On the baseball team he was a pitcher.

== See also ==
- 1902 College Football All-Southern Team
- 1907 College Football All-America Team
