= Lucius Horatio Biglow =

American football player and coach (1885–1961)

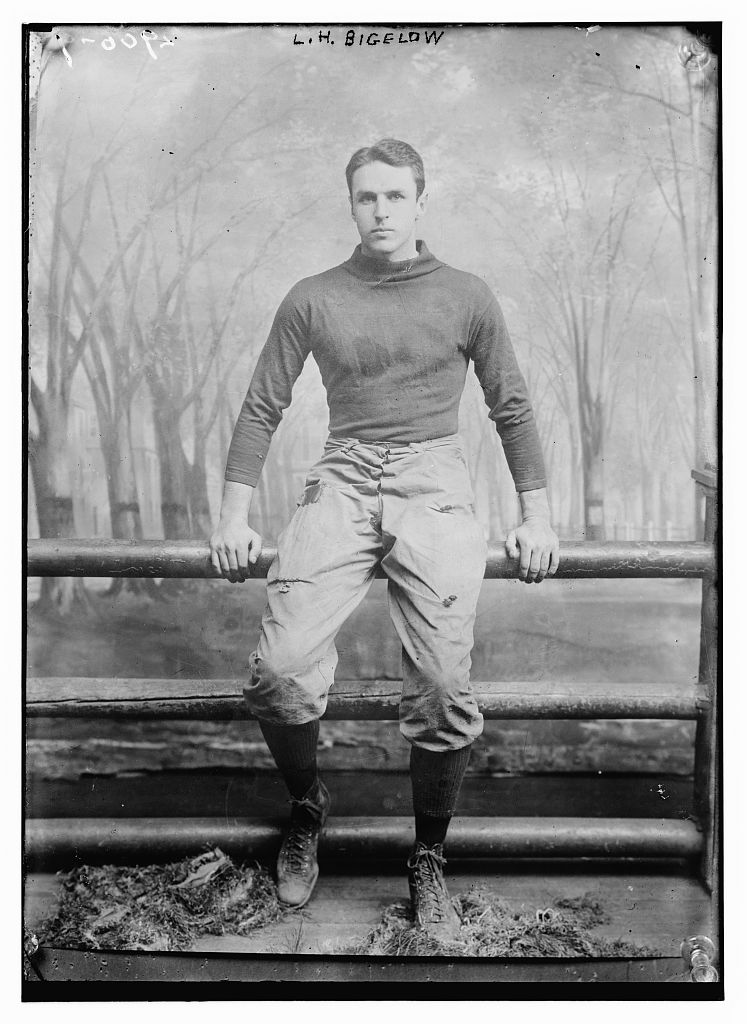

Biographical details
- Born: February 28, 1885; Brooklyn, New York, U.S.
- Died: July 9, 1961 (aged 76); Boston, Massachusetts, U.S.

Playing career
- 1905–1907: Yale
- Position: Tackle

Coaching career (HC unless noted)
- 1908: Yale

Head coaching record
- Overall: 7–1–1

Accomplishments and honors

Championships
- National (1907)

Awards
- 2× Consensus All-American (1906, 1907); Third-team All-American (1905)

Lucius Horatio "Ray" Biglow III (often spelled Bigelow; February 28, 1885 – July 9, 1961) was an American college football player and coach. He played right guard for Yale University from 1905 to 1907. He was selected as an All-American in both 1906 and 1907 and served as Yale Bulldogs football coach in 1908.

== Biography ==
Biglow was born on February 28, 1885, in Brooklyn, New York, to Lucius Horatio Biglow II and Susan Ann (née Moser) Biglow.

He was raised in Morristown, New Jersey, and attended the Lawrenceville School. He later enrolled at Yale University, where he graduated in 1908 and was a member of Skull and Bones.

He married Marian Chandler Yeaw; and they had one son, Lucius Horatio, Jr.

== College athletics ==
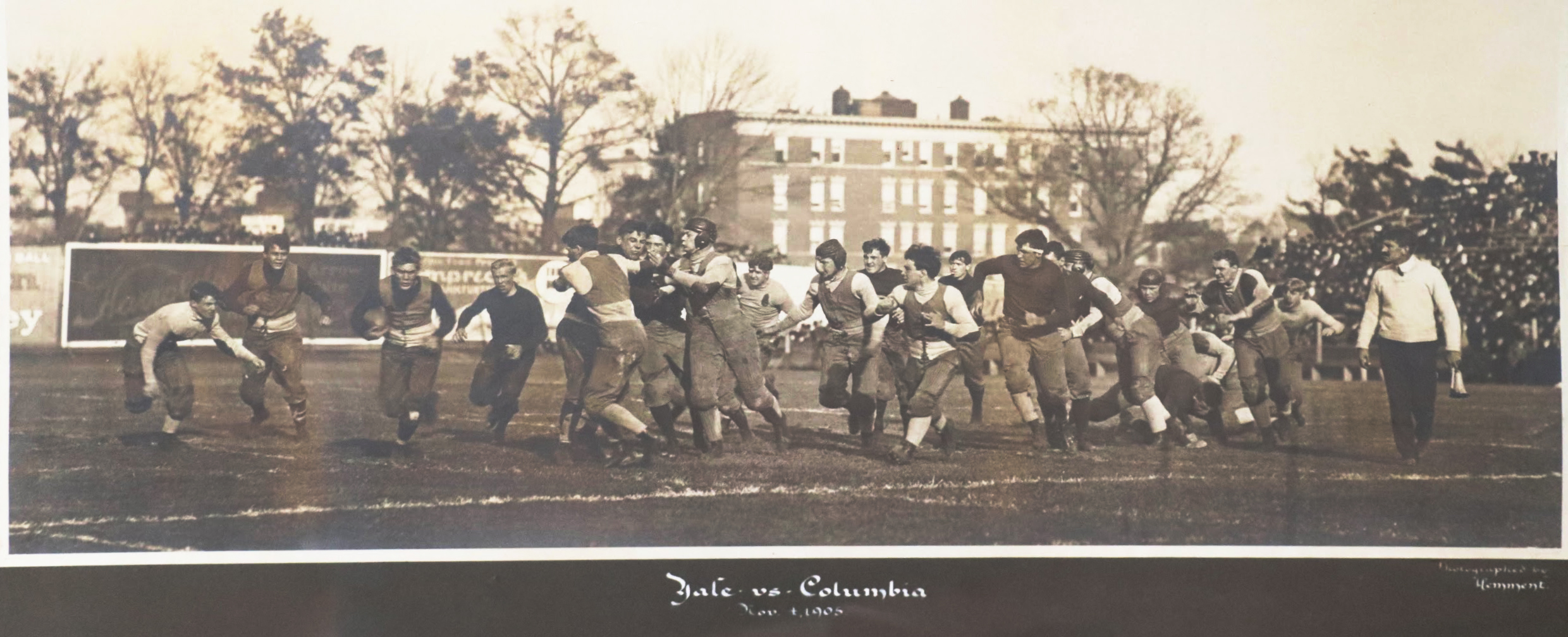
Yale versus Columbia game, held on November 1, 1908

At Yale, he was the right guard on the school's football team for three years. He also played point on the ice hockey team for two years, helping the Elis win the Intercollegiate Championship in 1908.

Biglow was selected as an All-American in 1906 and unanimously elected as the captain of Yale's 1907 championship football team. He was also tapped for Yale's Skull and Bones society in 1906. A November 1907 newspaper article said of Biglow:

"Yale's captain is sturdy right tackle Bigelow. ... Bigelow is typically a Yale football product. During his prep school at Lawrenceville he failed to even make a place on the minor aggregation.

Biglow was also on the Yale crew one year. Despite having "pulled the strongest oar in the varsity shell" during his one year competing on the crew, his parents opposed his rowing any longer.

== Career ==
=== Yale football coach ===
Biglow's parents wished for him to commence a business career upon his graduation in 1908, leading him to decline to follow the Yale tradition of having the football team captain return the following fall as the team's coach. However, in January 1908, Yale's new football team captain Robert Burch announced that he had persuaded Biglow to return in the fall as Yale's head football coach.

As Yale's coach, Biglow advocated better moral standards in college athletics:

"'The time was,' says Ray Biglow, former captain of the Yale team and now its coach, 'when the best fellow in college was he who could drink all his fellows under the table. I venture to say that two-thirds of the men on the great amateur baseball and football teams now are either out-and-out Christians or morally clean.'"

Biglow served in the position as Yale's football coach for one year.

=== US Army ===
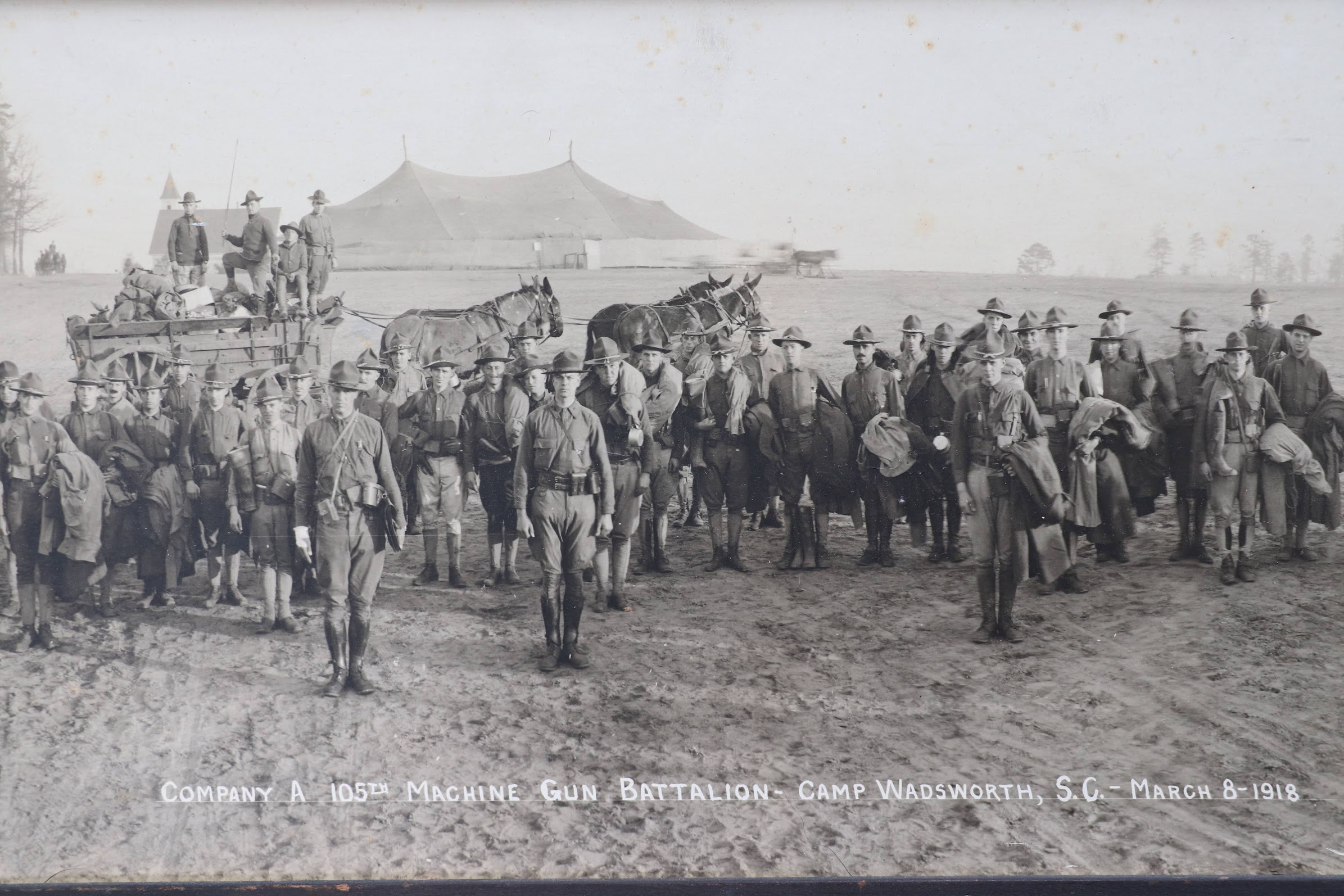
Company A, 105th Machine Gun Battalion, Camp Wadsworth, South Carolina, March 8, 1918

Biglow enlisted in the United States Army in December, 1909, in Troop 1, Squadron A Cavalry, New York City. He attained the rank of 2nd Lieutenant with the 105th machine gun battalion of Squadron A in April 1917. He was promoted to captain of Company A in 1918 and saw action in engagements at several locations in France during World War I. He was twice cited for his effective leadership, once while sustaining fire while his men were suffering losses and once for leadership and courage for pushing his machine gun squad forward in battle. He was honorably discharged in April 1919.

=== Law and publishing ===
Biglow graduated from Columbia Law school in 1911 and embarked on a career in law, upon his discharge from the US Army. He joined his father's New York publishing company L.H. Bigelow & Company, printers and publishers, and resided successively in Plainfield and Greenwich, Connecticut.

== Legacy ==
In 1912, a newspaper article on the greatest football players produced by Yale referred to the "brilliant Ray Bigelow" who was "always just a little better than anyone than any who played against him." Biglow remained an active supporter of Yale football and, in 1915, created a "sensation" when he advocated hiring of Foster Sanford as the school's head football coach in a letter to the Yale Daily News.

Biglow died after a long illness at Massachusetts General Hospital in Boston, Massachusetts, on July 9, 1961, at the age of 76.

== Head coaching record ==
Year	Team	Overall	Conference	Standing	Bowl/playoffs
Yale Bulldogs (Independent) (1908)
1908	Yale	7–1–1			
Yale:		7–1–1			
Total:		7–1–1			

== See also ==
- John Biglow
