= Gus Ziegler =

American football player and coach (1875–1960)

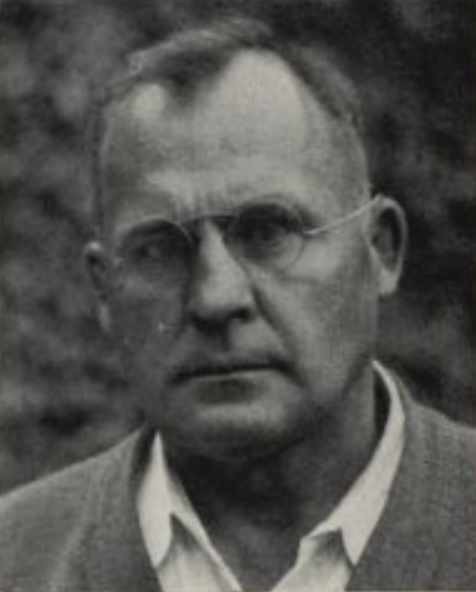
- Ziegler pictured in The Blue Hen 1931, Delaware yearbook

Biographical details
- Born: October 24, 1875; Royersford, Pennsylvania, U.S.
- Died: April 14, 1960 (aged 84); Delaware County, Pennsylvania, U.S.

Playing career
- 1903–1904: Penn
- 1906–1907: Penn
- Position: Guard

Coaching career (HC unless noted)
- 1908–1910: Mercersburg Academy (PA)
- 1911: Phillips Exeter Academy (NH)
- 1913: Penn (assistant)
- 1914: West Virginia (assistant)
- 1917: California (assistant)
- 1920: Penn (assistant line)
- 1921: Penn (line)
- 1929–1930: Delaware

Head coaching record
- Overall: 6–10–2 (college)

Accomplishments and honors

Awards
- 2× consensus All-American (1906, 1907)

Augustus Bergey Ziegler (October 24, 1875 – April 14, 1960) was an American football player and coach. He played college football at the University of Pennsylvania, where he was a two-time All-American at guard. Ziegler served as the head football coach at the University of Delaware from 1929 to 1930, compiling a record of 6–10–2.

Ziegler was born in Royersford, Pennsylvania. He married Morea Marguerite Drumm on January 20, 1917, in Philadelphia.

== Playing career ==
Ziegler played at the guard position for the University of Pennsylvania from 1903 to 1904 and 1906 to 1907. He was selected as a consensus first-team All-American in both 1906 and 1907. In 1907, Ziegler led the Penn Quakers to their fifth national football championship after finishing the season with an 11–1 record.

== Head coaching record ==
=== College ===
Year	Team	Overall	Conference	Standing	Bowl/playoffs
Delaware Fightin' Blue Hens (Independent) (1929–1930)
1929	Delaware	0–7–1			
1930	Delaware	6–3–1			
Delaware:		6–10–2			
Total:		6–10–2			
