= William Erwin (American football) =

American football player and US Army officer (1884–1953)

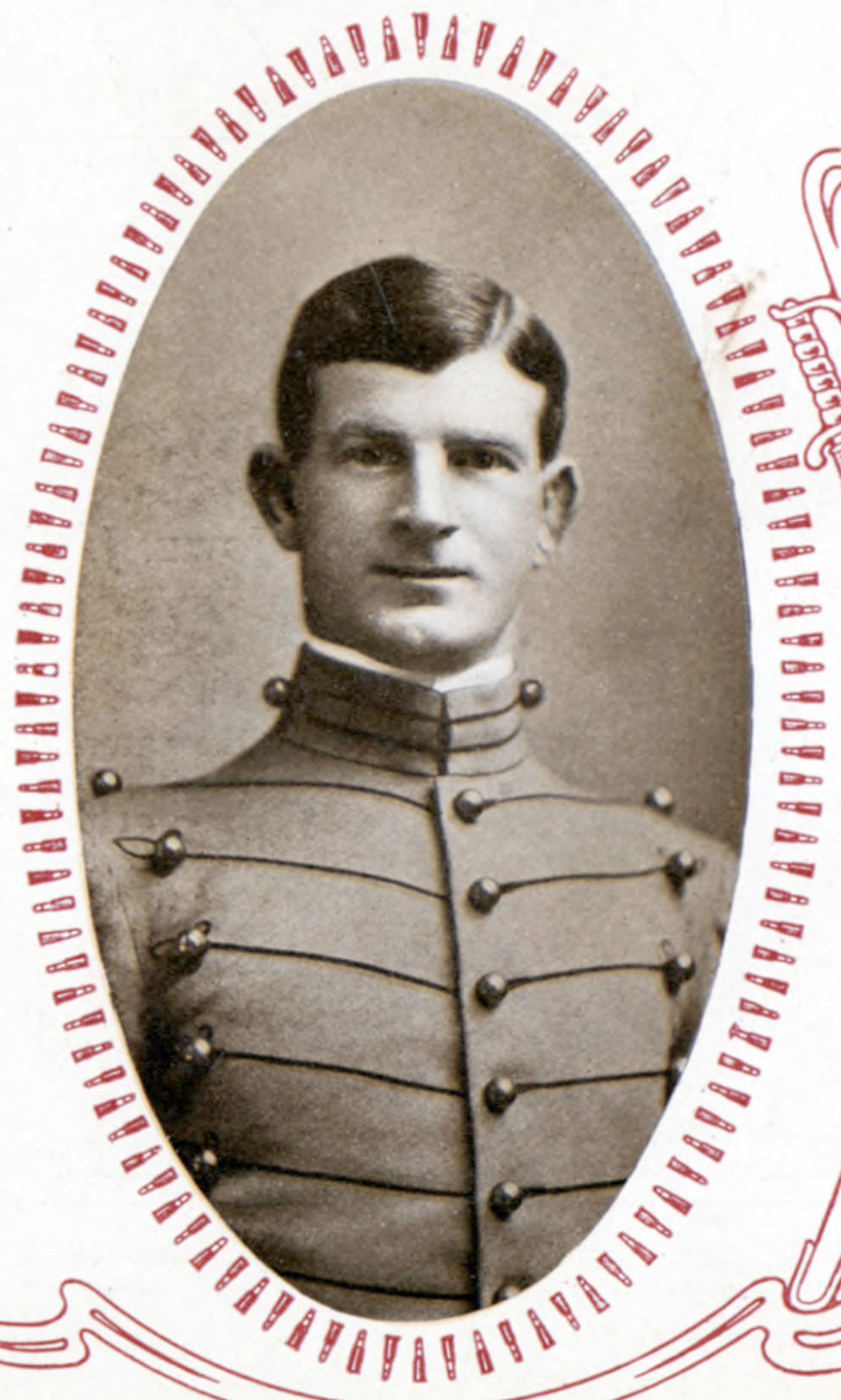
- At West Point in 1908

Army (1907)
- Position: Guard

Personal information
- Born: April 6, 1884; Kansas, U.S.
- Died: March 28, 1953 (aged 68); Chapman, Kansas, U.S.

Awards and highlights
- Consensus All-American (1907)

William Walter Erwin (April 6, 1884 – March 28, 1953) was an American football player and United States Army officer. He played for the Army football team and was selected as a consensus first-team guard on the 1907 College Football All-America Team.

== Biography ==
Erwin was born in Kansas on April 6, 1884. He attended the United States Military Academy at West Point, New York. While at the Academy, he played at the guard position for the Army football team and was a consensus first-team selection for the 1907 College Football All-America Team.

Erwin graduated from the Military Academy in 1908 and spent his entire career in the Army. He was initially commissioned as a second lieutenant in the 9th Cavalry in February 1908 and stationed in the Philippines from May 1908 to May 1909. From June 1909 to September 1912, he was stationed at Fort D.A. Russell in Wyoming and Fort Sam Houston in Texas. From July 1913 to March 1916, he was assigned to the Military Academy as a special instructor in the department of tactics. He was promoted to first lieutenant in the 9th Cavalry in May 1915 and transferred to the 7th Cavalry in November 1915.

From the spring of 1916 to February 1917, he was part of the Army's "Punitive Expedition" (also known as the Pancho Villa Expedition) into Mexico and thereafter served at Camp Stewart in Texas until May 1917.

In May 1917, with the United States entry into World War I, Erwin was promoted to the rank of captain and placed in command of training camps at Fort Snelling in Minnesota. From November 1917 to October 1918, he served as an instructor at the Machine Gun Schools at Fort Sill in Oklahoma and at Camp Hancock. He was promoted to the rank of major, temporary, in December 1917.

In October 1918, Erwin sailed for France as a machine gun officer with the 31st Division. The war ended in November 1918, and Erwin was assigned to the School for Care of Animals in France. He returned to the United States in August 1919 and was returned to the rank of captain in September 1919.

Erwin died in Chapman, Kansas on March 28, 1953, and was buried at Saint Patrick's Cemetery there.
