= Bill Dague =

American football player and coach (1885–1963)

Biographical details
- Born: October 28, 1885; Fowler, Indiana, U.S.
- Died: August 27, 1963 (aged 77); Los Angeles, California, U.S.

Playing career
- 1902–1903: Wabash
- 1905–1907: Navy
- Position: End

Coaching career (HC unless noted)
- 1915: Adrian

Head coaching record
- Overall: 2–5

Accomplishments and honors

Awards
- Consensus All-American (1907); Second-team All-American (1906)

William Henry Dague Jr. (October 28, 1885 – August 27, 1963) was an American football player and coach. He played college football for Wabash College and the United States Naval Academy. He was the first consensus All-American at Navy. He later served as an assistant football coach at Navy starting in 1908 and served as an officer on the USS Cincinnati on the Asiatic Station from 1912 to 1914. He was the head football coach at Adrian College in 1915.

== Early years ==
Dague was born in Fowler, Indiana in 1885. His father, William Henry Dague Sr., was a banker who was born in Pennsylvania in December 1844. At the time of the 1900 U.S. Census, Dague was living in Benton, Indiana with his father and two adult brothers. His mother had died. One brother, Maynard, was born in April 1879 and working as a miner. The other, Samuel, was born in August 1877 and was working as a lawyer.

== College ==
Dague enrolled at Wabash College in Crawfordsville, Indiana. He played college football as an end for the Wabash Little Giants in 1902 and 1903. In a game against Notre Dame on Thanksgiving Day 1903, Dague had the longest run of the game on a 60-yard on the kickoff to start the second half. A newspaper account described Dague's return as follows:

"The mighty Salmon kicked off and Dague caught the ball near his own goal line. He started up the field and by artful dodging wormed his way through the entire bunch. The last to tackle him was Capt. Salmon but the clever little player side-stepped him and the red headed hero of Notre Dame just grazed his ankle. It was sufficient to throw Dague off his balance, however, and before he could recover some four or five excited Catholics were piling upon him."

He was admitted to the United States Naval Academy in July 1904 and played at the end position for the Navy Midshipmen football team from 1905 to 1907. He was selected as a first-team All-American in both 1906 and 1907. In his final football game for Navy, Dague helped lead the Navy to a 6–0 win over Army in front of 30,000 spectators at Philadelphia's Franklin Field. The New York Times described Dague's contributions to the victory as follows: "Dague was a mercury-footed end that no runner escaped, his tackles being death-dealing in their fierceness. He followed the ball almost by scent and was always ready to pounce on the catcher immediately the ball settled in his arms." He was the first consensus All-American player selected from the U.S. Naval Academy. In December 1907, an Indiana newspaper reported on Dague's achievements as follows: "Will Dague of the U. S. Naval Academy at Annapolis, has bloomed into national celebrity as a star football player. He played right end for the navy in the army-navy game at Philadelphia Nov. 30th, and won special mention in all the eastern papers for the brilliant playing."

In May 1908, Dague was presented with a sword as the best all-around athlete at the Naval Academy. In addition to playing football, he played right field for the Navy baseball team in 1907 and 1908 and led the Navy baseball team in batting. He also competed in wrestling as a lightweight.

== Football coach and military service ==
In the fall of 1908, Dague joined the football coaching staff at the Naval Academy.

In June 1912, Dague was promoted to the rank of lieutenant in the U.S. Navy. He served on the USS Cincinnati on the Asiatic Station. In November 1914, Dague resigned from the Navy and returned to his home in Fowler, Indiana.

In October 1915, Dague was hired to coach the football team at Adrian College in Adrian, Michigan for the remainder of the football season and to "take charge of college athletics all year." Dague was the head coach for the Adrian Bulldogs football for the 1915 season. His coaching record at Adrian was 2 wins and 5 losses. Dague reportedly also had "gained some experience as a coach at Wabash."

== Death ==
Dague died in 1963 at age 77 in Los Angeles, California. He is buried at the Los Angeles National Cemetery (Section 191 Row Y Site 17).

== Head coaching record ==
Year	Team	Overall	Conference	Standing	Bowl/playoffs
Adrian Bulldogs (Michigan Intercollegiate Athletic Association) (1915)
1915	Adrian	2–5	0–4	6th	
Adrian:		2–5	0–4		
Total:		2–5			
