= Edward Dillon (American football) =

American football player, coach, and judge (1882–1935)

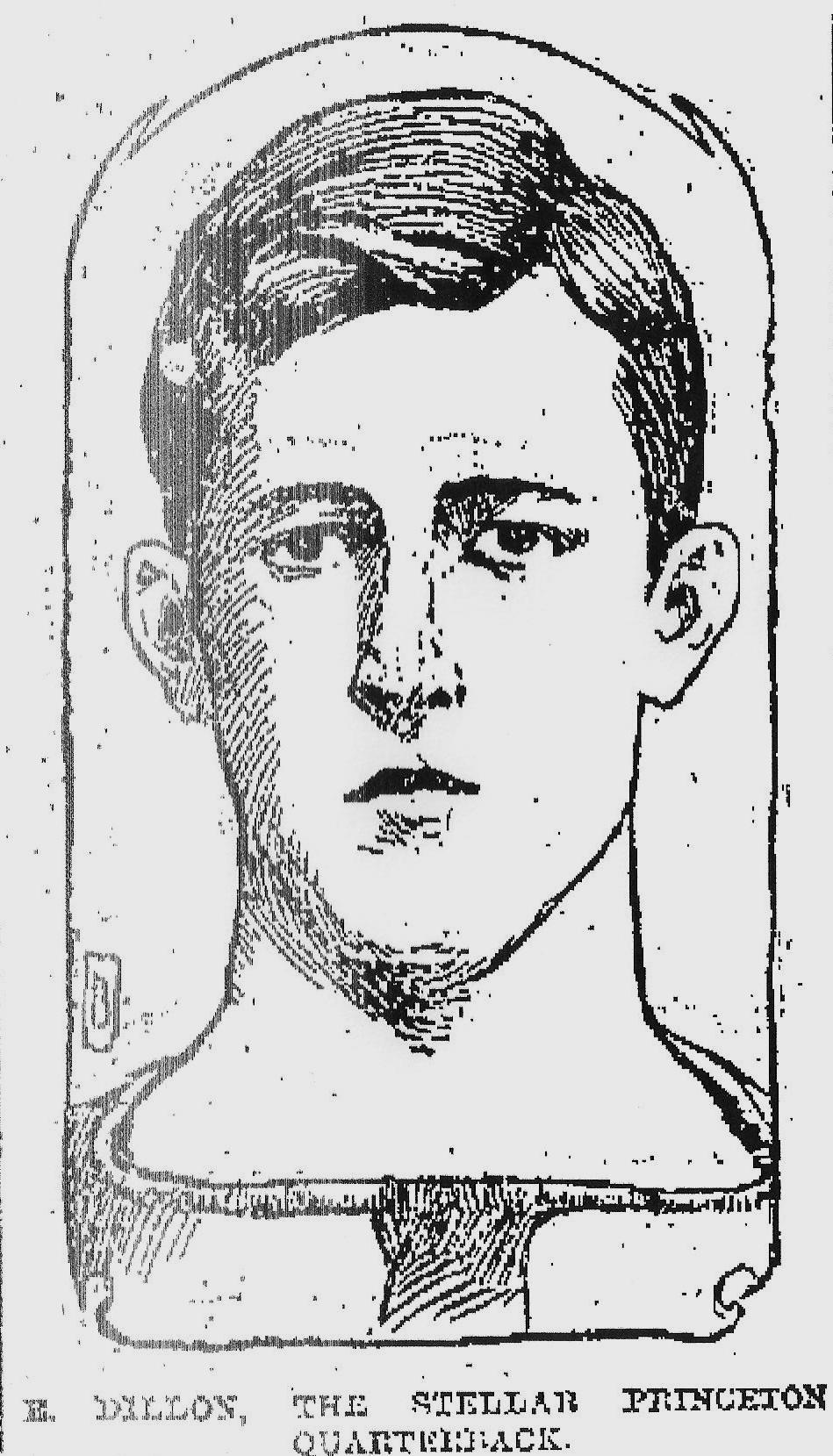

Biographical details
- Born: November 1, 1882; Lawrence, Massachusetts, U.S.
- Died: January 30, 1935 (aged 52); Montclair, New Jersey, U.S.

Playing career
- 1905–1908: Princeton
- Position: Quarterback

Coaching career (HC unless noted)
- 1909: Sewanee (backfield)

Accomplishments and honors

Championships
- National (1906)

Awards
- Consensus All-American (1906); Second-team All-American (1907)

Edward Aloysius Dillon (November 1, 1882 – January 30, 1935) was an American college football player and coach as well as a judge. He was the quarterback of the Princeton Tigers football team for four years from 1905 to 1908 and was selected as a first-team All-American in 1906 and 1907. He served as a state court judge in New Jersey from 1922 until the time of his death in 1935.

== Biography ==
=== Early years ===
Dillon was born in Lawrence, Massachusetts in 1882. He was the son of Edward Dillon, who was considered "one of the best printers in New England," and Mary Ann Beasley. His father was born in England to Irish parents and his mother was born in Ireland. Dillon attended Phillips Academy before enrolling at Princeton University.

=== Princeton ===
At Princeton, Dillon was the quarterback for the university's football teams from 1905 to 1908. He also played center field and second base for Princeton's baseball team, returned punts and kickoffs for the football team, and was the first Princeton quarterback to make use of the forward pass. Sports columnist Lawrence Perry later wrote that Dillon was "as intrepid a ball carrier, as game a defensive back as ever wore orange and black stripes." Perry described Dillon as follows:

"Eddie Dillon was an Irish boy from Massachusetts, resilient as a Damascus blade, the temper of which he approximated physically and mentally. He had clear gray eyes, a lean square jaw and a will of his own. His pride was the pride of a boy sensitive to the last degree."

In 1906, Dillon was selected as a first-team All-American by Caspar Whitney and The New York Times. In 1907, he was selected as a first-team All-American by Fielding H. Yost and a second-team All-American by Walter Camp and Casper Whitney. He was also selected as captain of Princeton's football team for the 1908 season. In the 1908 publication Spalding's How to Play Football, Dillon's contributions to the Princeton football team were described as follows:

"Dillon of Princeton is one of the cleverest quarters that ever handled the ball. Not only does he drive his team well, but he uses his plays with judgment, and he himself is a wonder at catching kicks and running them back. He does not himself enter into the interference or the push as much as some other quarters, and Princeton's plan of play does not give him the kind of forward passing to do as mentioned above in the case of Jones. He acts as though he could perform these duties if they were given him, and I look to see him develop along this line this season."

As a senior in 1908, Dillon was the captain of Princeton's football team, but he missed almost the entire season on account of injuries. At the end of the 1908 season, Caspar Whitney wrote in selecting his All-American team that "Dillon of Princeton would undoubtedly have had the call for quarter if he had been able to play, but his injury rendered him practically of no use to his team."

=== Later years ===
In 1910, Dillon was hired as the head football coach at the University of Missouri in Columbia, Missouri after assisting Sewanee to a title in 1909, but he was released from his contract in March 1910 "on the plea that business complications in Philadelphia necessitated his removal there." Dillon played professional football for the Lyceum team in Pittsburgh. The Lyceum team was undefeated from 1910 to 1912.

During World War I, Dillon served as a pilot with the rank of ensign in the U.S. Navy's Naval Aviation Corps. He served as a judge of New Jersey's first judicial district from 1922 until his death in 1935 at age 52. Dillon died on the handball courts of the Montclair Athletic Club in Montclair, New Jersey.
