= Elmer Thompson =

American football player

Cornell Big Red
- Position: Guard

Personal information
- Born: c. 1885
- Died: February 1929
- Listed weight: 250 lb (113 kg)

Career information
- College: Cornell (1905–1907)

Awards and highlights
- Consensus All-American (1906); 2× Second-team All-American (1905, 1907)

Elmer Thompson (c. 1885 – February 1929) was an American football player. He played for Cornell University from 1905 to 1907 and was selected as an All-American in both 1906 and 1907.

== Biography ==
Thompson grew up in Waterbury, Connecticut and played three years of football at Andover. He was also a "weight man" for Andover's track team, competing in the hammer throw and shot put. Thompson was the captain of Andover's football team as a senior, and in April 1903, the Boston Evening Transcript reported that he had been "much sought after" due to "his splendid" work on the Andover football team. He initially committed to attend Yale University, but changed his mind and enrolled at Cornell University. He played at the guard position for Cornell football team from 1905 to 1907, and was selected as an All-American in 1906 and 1907. He weighed "close to 250 pounds," and The New York Times described him as "one of the largest men who ever played on a college gridiron." Despite his large size, Thompson was also known for his speed as reflected in the following 1907 newspaper story:

"Big Elmer Thompson in the guise of a sprinter was the novel sight which the enthusiasts at the football practice were treated to yesterday afternoon. The Cornell left guard, who weighs about 220, surprised the coaches by the way he got down under punts, sometimes beating out Van Osman, the fleet end."

In 1927, the New York Sun named Thompson to its first-team list of the greatest football players in Cornell history. In explaining its selection, the Sun emphasized Thompson's ability to scatter the opposing team's line:

"Elmer Thompson's one weakness was his good-natured, easy-going temperament. This burly, frizzle-haired blonde weighed 240 pounds—all of it solid bone and muscle. Tommy loomed up like Gibraltar. He didn't make a hole in the opposing line; he simply scattered it. His touseled yellow head gleamed through the melee like Henry of Navarre's white plume."

In February 1908, Thompson was "dropped from the Cornell College of Law on account of deficiencies in his studies." According to reports at the time, Thompson "was 'busted' out after failing to pass enough subjects at the close of the first term." Thompson appealed his case in a petition to the faculty, but they refused to reopen his case. Under Cornell rules, Thompson lost his eligibility to play football at Cornell.

After leaving Cornell, Thompson applied to President William Howard Taft to be a special Secret Service guard. In 1909 and 1910, he worked as the football coach for Polytechnic Preparatory High School in New York.

In 1929, Thompson died at his home after a short illness.

In 1955, Thompson was selected by The Cornell Daily Sun as one of two guards on Cornell's all-time football team.
