= Jack Wendell =

American football player (1885–1962)

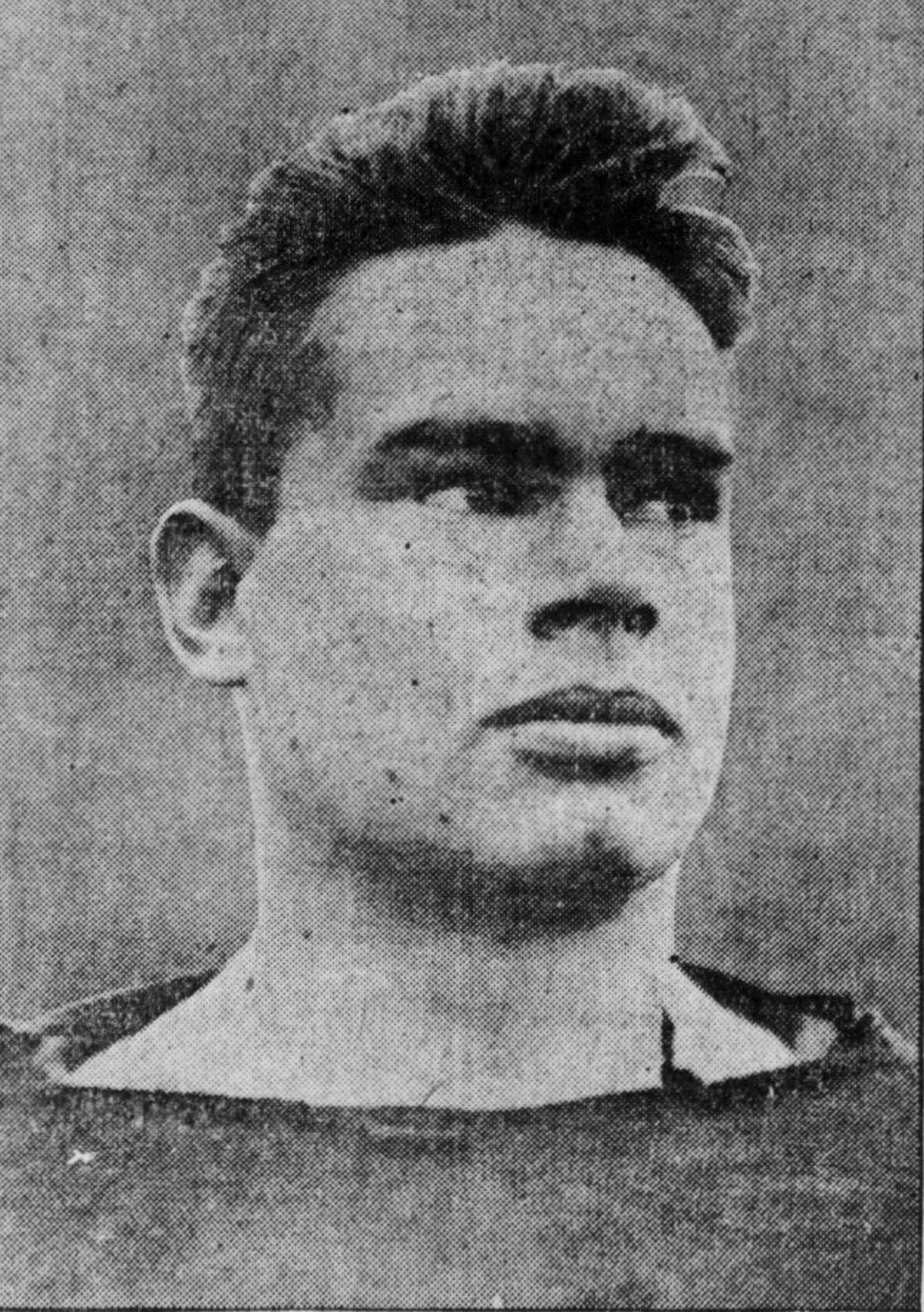
- Jack Wendell, 1907

Profile
- Position: Halfback

Personal information
- Born: November 20, 1885; Philadelphia, Pennsylvania, U.S.
- Died: December 1962 (aged 77)

Career information
- College: Harvard College

Career history
- 1907: Harvard

Awards and highlights
- Consensus All-American (1907); Second-team All-American (1906)

John Wheelwright Wendell (November 20, 1885 – December 1962) was an American football player.

Wendell attended Roxbury Latin School, where he was captain of the football team. He then enrolled at Harvard University. He was a substitute halfback in 1904 and a regular at halfback in 1905. He moved to fullback in 1906. As a senior in 1907, he missed the early games due to academic troubles. When he returned, he played well enough to be selected by Walter Camp as a halfback on the 1907 College Football All-America Team. He was only five feet, nine inches, and 177 pounds in 1907. Wendell received a Bachelor of Science degree from Harvard in 1908 or 1909.

His younger brother, Percy Wendell, also starred in Harvard's backfield, from 1910 to 1912.
