= Charles Chadwick (athlete) =

American hammer thrower

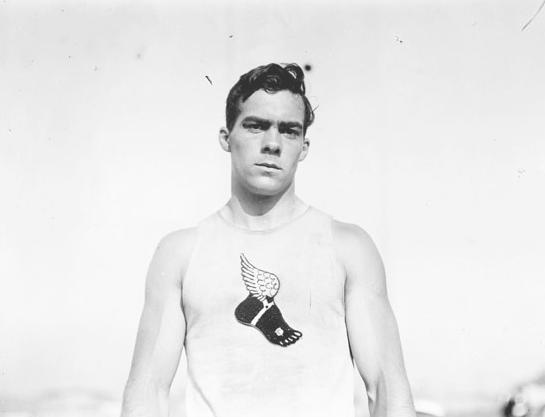

Profile
- Position: Guard

Personal information
- Born: November 19, 1874; Brooklyn, New York, U.S.
- Died: September 28, 1953 (aged 78); Boston, Massachusetts, U.S.

Career information
- College: Yale (1897)

Awards and highlights
- Second-team All-American (1897)

Charles Chadwick (November 19, 1874 – September 28, 1953) was an All-American football player and Yale strong man who graduated from Yale in 1897. His younger brother, George, was also a Yale All-American and captain of the undefeated Yale football team in 1902. He competed at the 1904 Summer Olympics. He was born in Brooklyn and died in Boston, Massachusetts.

Following his athletic career at Yale, Chadwick earned his law degree from the New York Law School in 1899. He served as deputy assistant district attorney in New York (1902-06) and assistant corporation counsel for the city (1908, 1909). He became a well-known sportswriter for the New York World and a syndicated sports columnist. He also authored at least two books and other works.

== Books ==
The Cactus: A Novel. New York: Crowell, 1925.

The Moving House of Foscaldo. London: Cassell, 1926. Repr. Street, UK: Serling Lake, 2025.

== Short stories ==
As Owen Devlin

- "Oar Number Five." The Popular Magazine, 15 Jul 1911.

As Daniel Steele

- "Adventure of Prince Pozzanceit and the Pearl Necklace." Popular Magazine, 15 Jan. 1912.
- "The 'Bad Man.'" Popular Magazine, 15 Jun 1912.
- "The Case Against Walter Simpkins." New Story Magazine, Oct. 1911.
- "Ellis in Search of a Feather." The Popular Magazine, 15 Jan., 1 Feb. 1913.
- "The Emerald Snake." The Popular Magazine, 1 Mar. 1913.
- "The End of the Game." Ainslee’s, Nov. 1908.
- "The Good Man’s Double." The Popular Magazine, 15 Dec. 1911.
- "The Last Lap." Ainslee’s, Mar. 1909.
- "The Man Who Couldn’t Play Football." The Popular Magazine, 15 Nov. 1912.
- "The Monster of Middleditch." The Popular Magazine 15 Oct. 1912.
- "Pawn to Queen’s Eighth." The Popular Magazine, 1 Nov. 1910.
- "The Surprise of the Day." Sport Story Magazine, 22 Feb 1926.
- "They Also Serve." Ainslee’s, Oct. 1908.
- "The Twist of a Screw." The Popular Magazine, 15 May 1912.
- "Up to the Coxswain." The Popular Magazine, 15 Jul. 1914.
- "What Hope?" Top-Notch Magazine, 15 Mar. 1916.
