= Frank Slingluff Jr. =

American football player and naval officer (1886–1947)

Navy Midshipmen
- Position: Center

Personal information
- Born: July 5, 1886; Baltimore, Maryland
- Died: March 31, 1947 (aged 60); Washington, D.C.

Career information
- College: Navy

Frank Slingluff Jr. (July 5, 1886 – March 31, 1947) was an American football player and an officer in the United States Navy.

A native of Baltimore, Maryland, Slingluff attended the United States Naval Academy where he played college football as a center for the Navy Midshipmen football team. He was selected as a first-team All-American in 1907 by the New York Tribune.

After graduating from the Naval Academy, Slingluff served in the United States Navy, attaining the rank of commander. He was a destroyer commander in World War I, including stints as commander of the USS Tucker and USS Lamberton. He received the Navy Cross for distinguished service in a war zone. After retiring in 1937, Slingluff returned to active duty during World War II and served as an intelligence officer at the Caribbean Sea Frontier headquarters in Miami, Florida. He died in 1947 at age 60 at Garfield Hospital in Washington, D.C., and was buried at Arlington National Cemetery.
