= Caspar Wister =

American football player

PrincetonWister
Princeton Tigers
- Position: End

Personal information
- Born: February 24, 1888; Philadelphia, Pennsylvania, U.S.
- Died: October 1, 1968 (aged 80); Wynnewood, Pennsylvania, U.S.

Career information
- College: Princeton (1906–1907)

Awards and highlights
- National champion (1906); 2× Consensus All-American (1906, 1907)

Lewis Caspar "Cap" Wister (February 24, 1888 – October 1, 1968) was an American college football player and investment banker.

Wister was born in 1888 in the Germantown neighborhood of Philadelphia.

He played football at the end position for Princeton University. He was a consensus first-team end on the 1906 All-America football team. In a game against Villanova in 1906, Wister was on the receiving end of the first legal forward pass in Princeton history. He graduated from Princeton in 1908.

After graduating from Princeton, Wister went into the investment banking business. His business career was interrupted by service as an infantry captain in World War I. He died in 1968 at age 80 at his home in Wynnewood, Pennsylvania.
