= 1906 Springfield Training School football team =

American college football season

1906 Springfield Training School football
- Conference: Independent
- Record: 1–5–3
- Head coach: Charles E. Street (3rd season)
- Captain: Joseph S. Wright

1906 Eastern college football independents records
	Conf.			Overall
Team	W	L	T	W		L		T
Princeton		–		9	–	0	–	1
Yale		–		9	–	0	–	1
Haverford		–		7	–	0	–	2
Harvard		–		10	–	1	–	0
Cornell		–		8	–	1	–	2
Lafayette		–		8	–	1	–	1
Penn State		–		8	–	1	–	1
Washington & Jefferson		–		9	–	2	–	0
Swarthmore		–		7	–	2	–	0
Drexel		–		6	–	2	–	0
Tufts		–		6	–	2	–	0
Penn		–		7	–	2	–	3
Carlisle		–		9	–	3	–	0
Brown		–		6	–	3	–	0
Rutgers		–		5	–	2	–	2
Dartmouth		–		6	–	3	–	1
Syracuse		–		6	–	3	–	0
Colgate		–		4	–	2	–	2
Vermont		–		5	–	4	–	0
Fordham		–		5	–	3	–	0
Western U. of Penn.		–		6	–	4	–	0
Holy Cross		–		4	–	3	–	1
Amherst		–		3	–	3	–	1
Lehigh		–		5	–	5	–	1
Bucknell		–		3	–	4	–	1
Dickinson		–		3	–	4	–	2
Carnegie Tech		–		2	–	3	–	2
Army		–		3	–	5	–	1
Franklin & Marshall		–		3	–	5	–	1
Wesleyan		–		2	–	4	–	1
New Hampshire		–		2	–	5	–	1
Villanova		–		3	–	7	–	0
Springfield Training School		–		1	–	5	–	3
NYU		–		0	–	4	–	0

The 1906 Springfield Training School football team was an American football team that represented the International Young Men's Christian Association Training School—now known as Springfield College–as an independent during the 1906 college football season. Led by Charles E. Street in his third and final season as head coach, the team compiled a record of 1–5–3.

== Schedule ==
Date	Time	Opponent	Site	Result	Attendance	Source
September 29		Williston Seminary	Springfield, MA	L 0–12		
October 3		at Phillips Academy	Brothers Field; Andover, MA	T 0–0		
October 10		at Yale	Yale Field; New Haven, CT	L 0–12	1,000	
October 13		Rhode Island	Springfield, MA	W 33–0		
October 20	3:00 p.m.	at Harvard	Harvard Stadium; Boston, MA	L 0–44	5,000	
October 27		at Trinity (CT)	Trinity Field; Hartford, CT	T 6–6	600	
November 3		at Wesleyan	Andrus Field; Middletown, CT	L 0–5		
November 10		Worcester Tech	Springfield, MA	T 6–6		
November 17		Massachusetts	Springfield, MA	L 4–21		
