= Douglas Church =

American football coach

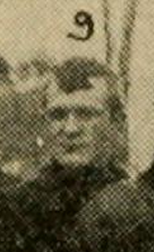
- Church pictured at NYU, c. 1906

Coaching career (HC unless noted)
- 1906: NYU

Head coaching record
- Overall: 0–4

Douglas J. Church was an American college football coach. He was the ninth head football coach at New York University (NYU), serving for one season, in 1906, and leading the NYU Violets to a record of 0–4.

== Head coaching record ==
Year	Team	Overall	Conference	Standing	Bowl/playoffs
NYU Violets (Independent) (1906)
1906	NYU	0–4			
NYU:		0–4			
Total:		0–4			
