= 1906 Massachusetts Aggies football team =

American college football season

1906 Massachusetts Aggies football
- Conference: Athletic League of New England State Colleges
- Record: 1–7–1 ( Athletic League of New England State Colleges)
- Head coach: George E. O'Hearn (1st season)
- Home stadium: Alumni Field

The 1906 Massachusetts Aggies football team represented Massachusetts Agricultural College in the 1906 college football season. The team was coached by George E. O'Hearn and played its home games at Alumni Field in Amherst, Massachusetts. The 1906 season was O'Hearn's only as head coach of the Aggies. Massachusetts finished the season with a record of 1–7–1.

== Schedule ==
Date	Opponent	Site	Result	Source
September 29	at Holy Cross	Fitton Field; Worcester, MA	L 4–6	
October 3	at Williams	Weston Field; Williamstown, MA	L 0–5	
October 6	New Hampshire	Alumni Field; Amherst, MA (rivalry)	T 0–0	
October 10	at Brown	Andrews Field; Providence, RI	L 0–17	
October 13	at Harvard	Harvard Stadium; Boston, MA	L 0–21	
October 20	at Dartmouth	Alumni Oval; Hanover, NH	L 0–26	
November 3	at Amherst	Pratt Field; Amherst, MA	L 8–12	
November 10	at Tufts	Tufts Oval; Somerville, MA	L 0–28	
November 17	at Springfield Training School	Springfield, MA	W 21–4	
