= Edward Herr =

American physician

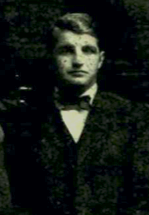
- Herr in The New Hampshire College Monthly of December 1906

Biographical details
- Born: January 4, 1883; Waterbury, Connecticut, U.S.
- Died: March 18, 1950 (aged 67); Waterbury, Connecticut, U.S.
- Education: University of Vermont

Playing career
- 1902–1905: Dartmouth

Coaching career (HC unless noted)
- 1906–1907: New Hampshire
- 1908: Vermont

Head coaching record
- Overall: 6–13–6

Edward Albert Herr (Note: New Hampshire's media guide lists his middle initial as 'R'; however, contemporary sources from the early 1900s refer to him as E. A. Herr.) (January 4, 1883 – March 18, 1950) was an American physician and college football player and coach.

== Biography ==
Herr was a 1906 graduate of Dartmouth College, where he played football for four years as a halfback and end. He then served as head coach of the New Hampshire football team in 1906 and 1907, (Note: The school was then named New Hampshire College of Agriculture and the Mechanic Arts; it would become the University of New Hampshire in 1923 and would adopt the Wildcats nickname in 1926.) and for the Vermont football team in 1908. In his three seasons as a head coach, Herr compiled an overall 6–13–6 record, for a .360 winning percentage.

In August 1906, Herr saved two women from drowning following a canoe accident in Squam Lake in New Hampshire. Following his time as a head coach, Herr earned his medical degree at the University of Vermont and went on to practice medicine in Hartford, Connecticut; Boston, Massachusetts; and Waterbury, Connecticut. He died in March 1950 at Saint Mary's Hospital in Waterbury, following a brief illness.

== Head coaching record ==
Year	Team	Overall	Conference	Standing	Bowl/playoffs
New Hampshire (Independent) (1906–1907 (Note: New Hampshire's media guide also lists Herr as their head coach for the 1905 season. However, this is not corroborated by contemporary sources, he was a student at Dartmouth through the 1905–06 academic year, and upon his hiring at Vermont it was noted that he had been coach at New Hampshire for the prior two years.))
1906	New Hampshire	2–5–1			
1907	New Hampshire	1–5–2			
New Hampshire:		3–10–3			
Vermont Green and Gold (Independent) (1908)
1908	Vermont	3–3–3			
Vermont:		3–3–3			
Total:		6–13–6			
