= 1906 New Hampshire football team =

American college football season

1906 New Hampshire football
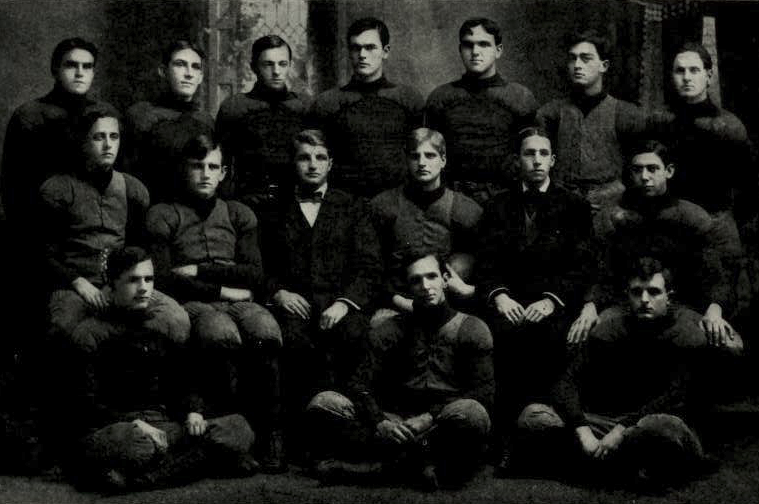
- Coach Herr is third from left in the middle row; team captain Ingham is third from right
- Conference: Independent
- Record: 2–5–1
- Head coach: Edward Herr (1st season)
- Captain: Harry E. Ingham (Note: In November 1905, the team elected Franklin E. Stockwell as captain for the 1906 season; when Stockwell withdrew from school, Ingham was selected.)
- Home stadium: College grounds, Durham, NH

1906 Eastern college football independents records
	Conf.			Overall
Team	W	L	T	W		L		T
Princeton		–		9	–	0	–	1
Yale		–		9	–	0	–	1
Haverford		–		7	–	0	–	2
Harvard		–		10	–	1	–	0
Cornell		–		8	–	1	–	2
Lafayette		–		8	–	1	–	1
Penn State		–		8	–	1	–	1
Washington & Jefferson		–		9	–	2	–	0
Swarthmore		–		7	–	2	–	0
Drexel		–		6	–	2	–	0
Tufts		–		6	–	2	–	0
Penn		–		7	–	2	–	3
Carlisle		–		9	–	3	–	0
Brown		–		6	–	3	–	0
Rutgers		–		5	–	2	–	2
Dartmouth		–		6	–	3	–	1
Syracuse		–		6	–	3	–	0
Colgate		–		4	–	2	–	2
Vermont		–		5	–	4	–	0
Fordham		–		5	–	3	–	0
Western U. of Penn.		–		6	–	4	–	0
Holy Cross		–		4	–	3	–	1
Amherst		–		3	–	3	–	1
Lehigh		–		5	–	5	–	1
Bucknell		–		3	–	4	–	1
Dickinson		–		3	–	4	–	2
Carnegie Tech		–		2	–	3	–	2
Army		–		3	–	5	–	1
Franklin & Marshall		–		3	–	5	–	1
Wesleyan		–		2	–	4	–	1
New Hampshire		–		2	–	5	–	1
Villanova		–		3	–	7	–	0
Springfield Training School		–		1	–	5	–	3
NYU		–		0	–	4	–	0

The 1906 New Hampshire football team (Note: The school did not adopt the Wildcats nickname until February 1926; before then, they were generally referred to as "the blue and white".) was an American football team that represented New Hampshire College of Agriculture and the Mechanic Arts (Note: The school was often referred to as New Hampshire College or New Hampshire State College in newspapers of the era.) during the 1906 college football season—the school became the University of New Hampshire in 1923. Under first-year head coach Edward Herr, (Note: New Hampshire's media guide lists 1905 as Herr's first season as head coach, but this is not corroborated; see discussion at 1905 New Hampshire football team.) the team finished with a record of 2–5–1.

== Schedule ==
This season introduced several rules changes, most notably legalization of the forward pass (with restrictions).

Scoring during this era awarded five points for a touchdown, one point for a conversion kick (extra point), and four points for a field goal. Teams played in the one-platoon system, and games were played in two halves rather than four quarters.

Date	Opponent	Site	Result	Attendance	Source
September 22	at Maine	Orono, ME (rivalry)	L 0–7		
September 29	at Brown	Andrews Field; Providence, RI	L 0–12		
October 6	at Massachusetts	Amherst, MA (rivalry)	T 0–0		
October 13	Colby	Durham, NH	L 0–15		
October 20	at Rhode Island	Kingston, RI	W 20–0		
October 27	Connecticut	Durham, NH	W 40–0		
November 3	at Bates	Garcelon Field; Lewiston, ME	L 0–11		
November 10	vs. Vermont	Varick Park; Manchester, NH	L 5–17	2,000	

The Vermont game in Manchester was attended by Governor of New Hampshire John McLane.

New Hampshire's second team (reserves) lost to Brewster Academy in Wolfeboro, New Hampshire, 11–5, and defeated Mohawk Athletic Club of Portsmouth, 5–0.

== Roster ==
The team photo consists of 14 players—likely all of the team's lettermen—plus coach Edward Herr and the student team manager.

Name	Position	Class	Team photo location
Arthur M. Batchelder	Left end	1908	Middle row, far left
Leon Dexter Batchelor	Team manager	1907	Middle row, second from right
Carl Chase	Center	1909	Back row, second from left
Charles F. Cone	Right halfback	1908	Middle row, second from left
Roland B. Hammond	Left tackle	1909	Front row, far right
Edward Herr	Head coach	n/a	Middle row, third from left
Merritt C. Huse	Right guard	1908	Back row, third from right
Harry E. Ingham (captain)	Right tackle	1907	Middle row, third from right
James M. Leonard	Left end	1910	Front row, far left
Frederick R. McGrail (Note: First name listed as "Frederic" in The Granite yearbook.)	Left guard	1910	Back row, far left
John J. O'Connor	Right tackle	1908	Back row, center
Charles S. Richardson	Left tackle	1909	Back row, far right
John J. Ryan	Quarterback	1910	Middle row, far right
Edson D. Sanborn	Right end	1909	Back row, third from left
George L. Waite	Fullback	1908	Back row, second from right
Carroll B. Wilkins	Left halfback	1909	Front row, center

In December 1908, center Carl Chase and another student drowned while canoeing in the nearby Great Bay. Quarterback John J. Ryan later played for Dartmouth College, where he captained the 1910 Dartmouth football team; he subsequently became a college sports coach, including two seasons each with the Wisconsin football team and the Marquette basketball team. Right end Edson D. Sanborn later coached the Student Army Training Corps (SATC) personnel of the 1918 New Hampshire football team that competed in place of the varsity. Team manager Leon Dexter Batchelor later became a horticulture professor and served as director of the University of California Citrus Experiment Station.
