= George W. King =

American football player and coach

George King
Biographical details
- Born: c. 1880
- Died: February 6, 1961 (aged 80); Springfield, Massachusetts, U.S.

Playing career
- 1902–1904: Holy Cross
- Position: Center

Coaching career (HC unless noted)
- 1906: Holy Cross

Head coaching record
- Overall: 4–3–1

George W. King (c. 1880 – February 6, 1961) was an American college football player and coach. He played center for the College of the Holy Cross in Worcester, Massachusetts from 1902 to 1904 and served as the head football coach at his alma mater in 1906, compiling a record of 4–3–1. King died at the age of 80, on February 6, 1961, at his home in Springfield, Massachusetts.

== Head coaching record ==
Year	Team	Overall	Conference	Standing	Bowl/playoffs
Holy Cross Crusaders (Independent) (1906)
1906	Holy Cross	4–3–1			
Holy Cross:		4–3–1			
Total:		4–3–1			
