= Henry Smither =

United States Army officer and football coach

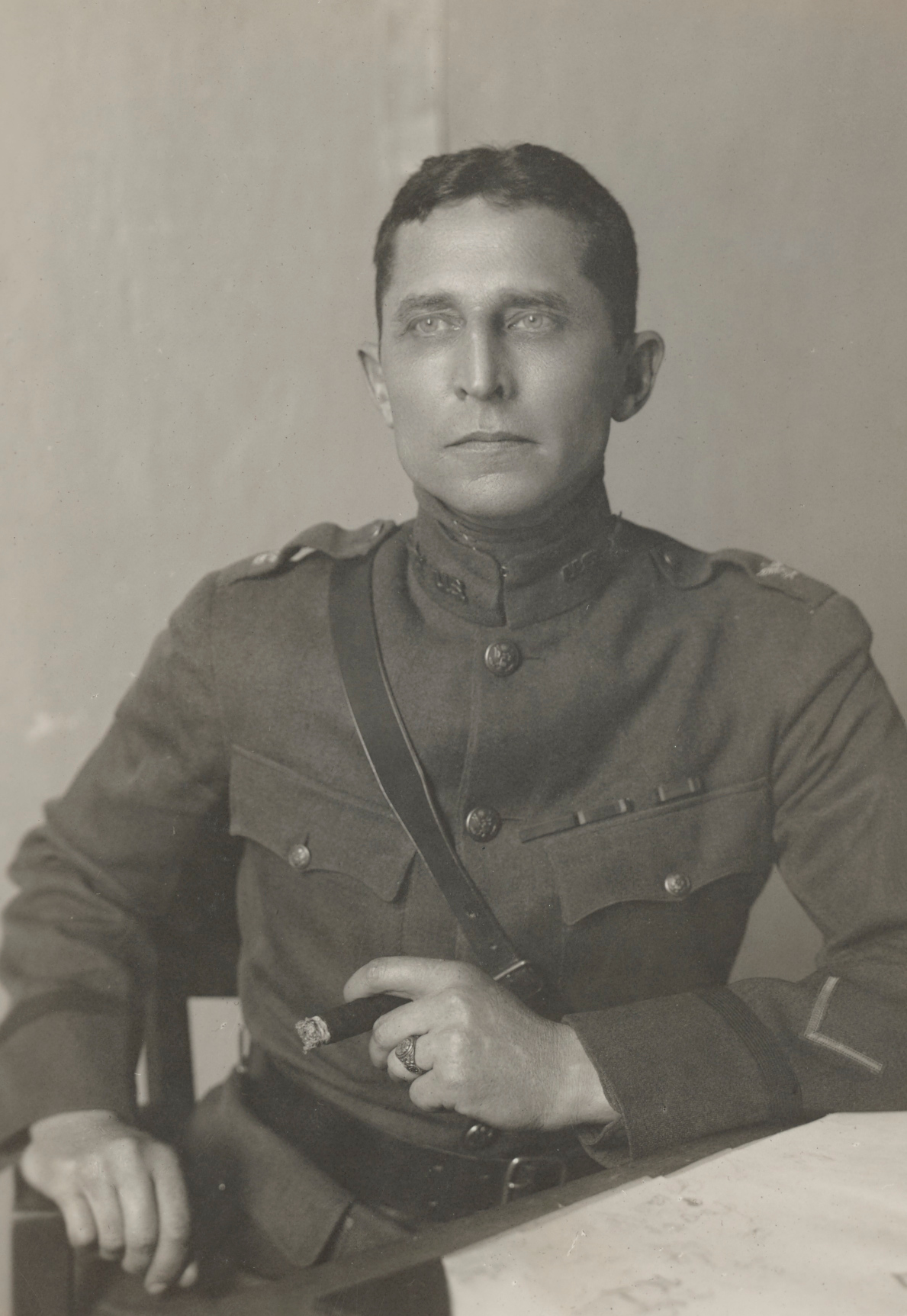
- Smither as colonel in France, 1918

Biographical details
- Born: July 28, 1873; Fort Sill, Oklahoma, U.S.
- Died: July 13, 1930 (aged 56); Lawrenceville, Illinois, U.S.

Coaching career (HC unless noted)
- 1906–1907: Army

Head coaching record
- Overall: 7–2–1

Henry Carpenter Smither (July 28, 1873 – July 13, 1930) was a United States Army officer and American football coach. He served as the head football coach at the United States Military Academy from 1906 to 1907, compiling a record of 7–2–1.

Smither was born on July 28, 1873, at Fort Sill and was the son General Robert Gano Smither. He attended schools in Burlington, Iowa, and graduated from West Point in 1897. Smither was a commanding officer during the Spanish–American War and the Philippine–American War. During World War I, he served as an adjutant to Peyton C. March, the Chief of Staff of the United States Army. Smither was promoted to brigadier general in 1925.

Smither died on July 13, 1930, at the Olney sanitarium in Lawrenceville, Illinois, following two operations for appendicitis.

== Head coaching record ==
Year	Team	Overall	Conference	Standing	Bowl/playoffs
Army Cadets (Independent) (1906–1907)
1906	Army	1–0 (Note: Smither was relieved from duty following a 12–0 victory over Tufts in the season opener. Ernest Graves Sr. served as head coach for the remaining eight games of the season, leading Army to a record of 2–5–1.)			
1907	Army	6–2–1			
Army:		7–2–1			
Total:		7–2–1			
