= 1906 Bucknell football team =

American college football season

1906 Bucknell football
- Conference: Independent
- Record: 3–4–1
- Head coach: George W. Hoskins (8th season)
- Captain: Girton Lenhart

1906 Eastern college football independents records
	Conf.			Overall
Team	W	L	T	W		L		T
Princeton		–		9	–	0	–	1
Yale		–		9	–	0	–	1
Haverford		–		7	–	0	–	2
Harvard		–		10	–	1	–	0
Cornell		–		8	–	1	–	2
Lafayette		–		8	–	1	–	1
Penn State		–		8	–	1	–	1
Washington & Jefferson		–		9	–	2	–	0
Swarthmore		–		7	–	2	–	0
Drexel		–		6	–	2	–	0
Tufts		–		6	–	2	–	0
Penn		–		7	–	2	–	3
Carlisle		–		9	–	3	–	0
Brown		–		6	–	3	–	0
Rutgers		–		5	–	2	–	2
Dartmouth		–		6	–	3	–	1
Syracuse		–		6	–	3	–	0
Colgate		–		4	–	2	–	2
Vermont		–		5	–	4	–	0
Fordham		–		5	–	3	–	0
Western U. of Penn.		–		6	–	4	–	0
Holy Cross		–		4	–	3	–	1
Amherst		–		3	–	3	–	1
Lehigh		–		5	–	5	–	1
Bucknell		–		3	–	4	–	1
Dickinson		–		3	–	4	–	2
Carnegie Tech		–		2	–	3	–	2
Army		–		3	–	5	–	1
Franklin & Marshall		–		3	–	5	–	1
Wesleyan		–		2	–	4	–	1
New Hampshire		–		2	–	5	–	1
Villanova		–		3	–	7	–	0
Springfield Training School		–		1	–	5	–	3
NYU		–		0	–	4	–	0

The 1906 Bucknell football team was an American football team that represented Bucknell University as an independent during the 1906 college football season. Led by eighth-year head coach George W. Hoskins, the team compiled a 3–4–1 record. Girton Lenhart was the team captain. The loss on November 24 to Gettysburg marked an end to a 24-game home winning streak, the longest in school history as of 2024.

== Schedule ==
Date	Time	Opponent	Site	Result	Attendance	Source
September 29		Mansfield	Lewisburg, PA	W 5–0		
October 13		at Cornell	Percy Field; Ithaca, NY	L 6–24		
October 20		at Princeton	University Field; Princeton, NJ	L 4–32	2,000	
October 27		at Navy	Worden Field; Annapolis, MD	T 0–0		
November 3		vs. Virginia	Broad Street Park; Richmond, VA	W 12–5		
November 10	3:00 p.m.	vs. VPI	Lafayette Field; Norfolk, VA	W 10–0		
November 24		Gettysburg	Lewisburg, PA	L 0–10		
November 29		at Steelton Athletic Club	Steelton, PA	L 0–17		
