= 1906 Haverford football team =

American college football season

1906 Haverford football
- Conference: Independent
- Record: 7–0–2
- Head coach: Norman Thorn (3rd season)
- Home stadium: Walton Field

1906 Eastern college football independents records
	Conf.			Overall
Team	W	L	T	W		L		T
Princeton		–		9	–	0	–	1
Yale		–		9	–	0	–	1
Haverford		–		7	–	0	–	2
Harvard		–		10	–	1	–	0
Cornell		–		8	–	1	–	2
Lafayette		–		8	–	1	–	1
Penn State		–		8	–	1	–	1
Washington & Jefferson		–		9	–	2	–	0
Swarthmore		–		7	–	2	–	0
Drexel		–		6	–	2	–	0
Tufts		–		6	–	2	–	0
Penn		–		7	–	2	–	3
Carlisle		–		9	–	3	–	0
Brown		–		6	–	3	–	0
Rutgers		–		5	–	2	–	2
Dartmouth		–		6	–	3	–	1
Syracuse		–		6	–	3	–	0
Colgate		–		4	–	2	–	2
Vermont		–		5	–	4	–	0
Fordham		–		5	–	3	–	0
Western U. of Penn.		–		6	–	4	–	0
Holy Cross		–		4	–	3	–	1
Amherst		–		3	–	3	–	1
Lehigh		–		5	–	5	–	1
Bucknell		–		3	–	4	–	1
Dickinson		–		3	–	4	–	2
Carnegie Tech		–		2	–	3	–	2
Army		–		3	–	5	–	1
Franklin & Marshall		–		3	–	5	–	1
Wesleyan		–		2	–	4	–	1
New Hampshire		–		2	–	5	–	1
Villanova		–		3	–	7	–	0
Springfield Training School		–		1	–	5	–	3
NYU		–		0	–	4	–	0

The 1906 Haverford football team was an American football team that represented Haverford College as an independent during the 1906 college football season. The team compiled a 7–0–2 record and outscored opponents by a total of 138 to 33. Norman Thorn was the head coach. He had been the captain of the 1903 Haverford team.

== Schedule ==
Date	Opponent	Site	Result	Source
October 6	Medico-Chirurgical	Walton Field; Haverford, PA	W 4–0	
October 13	at Lehigh	Lehigh Field; South Bethlehem, PA	W 5–0	
October 20	Rutgers	Walton Field; Haverford, PA	T 0–0	
October 27	Ursinus	Walton Field; Haverford, PA	W 23–16	
November 3	at Franklin & Marshall	Williamson Field; Lancaster, PA	W 4–0	
November 10	Johns Hopkins	Walton Field; Haverford, PA	W 23–0	
November 17	at Trinity (CT)	Trinity Field; Hartford, CT	T 0–0	
November 24	NYU	Walton Field; Haverford, PA	W 68–0	
