= 1906 Vermont Green and Gold football team =

American college football season

1906 Vermont Green and Gold football
- Conference: Independent
- Record: 5–4
- Head coach: George B. Drake (2nd season)
- Home stadium: Centennial Field

1906 Eastern college football independents records
	Conf.			Overall
Team	W	L	T	W		L		T
Princeton		–		9	–	0	–	1
Yale		–		9	–	0	–	1
Haverford		–		7	–	0	–	2
Harvard		–		10	–	1	–	0
Cornell		–		8	–	1	–	2
Lafayette		–		8	–	1	–	1
Penn State		–		8	–	1	–	1
Washington & Jefferson		–		9	–	2	–	0
Swarthmore		–		7	–	2	–	0
Drexel		–		6	–	2	–	0
Tufts		–		6	–	2	–	0
Penn		–		7	–	2	–	3
Carlisle		–		9	–	3	–	0
Brown		–		6	–	3	–	0
Rutgers		–		5	–	2	–	2
Dartmouth		–		6	–	3	–	1
Syracuse		–		6	–	3	–	0
Colgate		–		4	–	2	–	2
Vermont		–		5	–	4	–	0
Fordham		–		5	–	3	–	0
Western U. of Penn.		–		6	–	4	–	0
Holy Cross		–		4	–	3	–	1
Amherst		–		3	–	3	–	1
Lehigh		–		5	–	5	–	1
Bucknell		–		3	–	4	–	1
Dickinson		–		3	–	4	–	2
Carnegie Tech		–		2	–	3	–	2
Army		–		3	–	5	–	1
Franklin & Marshall		–		3	–	5	–	1
Wesleyan		–		2	–	4	–	1
New Hampshire		–		2	–	5	–	1
Villanova		–		3	–	7	–	0
Springfield Training School		–		1	–	5	–	3
NYU		–		0	–	4	–	0

The 1906 Vermont Green and Gold football team was an American football team that represented the University of Vermont as an independent during the 1906 college football season. In their second year under head coach George B. Drake, the team compiled a 5–4 record.

== Schedule ==
Date	Opponent	Site	Result	Source
October 3	at Dartmouth	Alumni Oval; Hanover, NH	L 0–8	
October 6	Middlebury	Centennial Field; Burlington, VT	W 11–0	
October 13	St. Lawrence	Centennial Field; Burlington, VT	W 29–2	
October 22	at Amherst	Pratt Field; Amherst, MA	L 0–6	
October 27	at Wesleyan	Andrus Field; Middletown, CT	L 8–22	
October 31	at Middlebury	Porter Field; Middlebury, VT	W 12–0	
November 3	Norwich	Centennial Field; Burlington, VT	W 5–0	
November 10	at New Hampshire	Varick Park; Manchester, NH	W 17–5	
November 17	at Brown	Andrews Field; Providence, RI	L 0–13	
