= 1906 Holy Cross football team =

American college football season

1906 Holy Cross football
- Conference: Independent
- Record: 4–3–1
- Head coach: George W. King (1st season)
- Captain: George S.L. Connor
- Home stadium: Fitton Field

1906 Eastern college football independents records
	Conf.			Overall
Team	W	L	T	W		L		T
Princeton		–		9	–	0	–	1
Yale		–		9	–	0	–	1
Haverford		–		7	–	0	–	2
Harvard		–		10	–	1	–	0
Cornell		–		8	–	1	–	2
Lafayette		–		8	–	1	–	1
Penn State		–		8	–	1	–	1
Washington & Jefferson		–		9	–	2	–	0
Swarthmore		–		7	–	2	–	0
Drexel		–		6	–	2	–	0
Tufts		–		6	–	2	–	0
Penn		–		7	–	2	–	3
Carlisle		–		9	–	3	–	0
Brown		–		6	–	3	–	0
Rutgers		–		5	–	2	–	2
Dartmouth		–		6	–	3	–	1
Syracuse		–		6	–	3	–	0
Colgate		–		4	–	2	–	2
Vermont		–		5	–	4	–	0
Fordham		–		5	–	3	–	0
Western U. of Penn.		–		6	–	4	–	0
Holy Cross		–		4	–	3	–	1
Amherst		–		3	–	3	–	1
Lehigh		–		5	–	5	–	1
Bucknell		–		3	–	4	–	1
Dickinson		–		3	–	4	–	2
Carnegie Tech		–		2	–	3	–	2
Army		–		3	–	5	–	1
Frankin & Marshall		–		3	–	5	–	1
Wesleyan		–		2	–	4	–	1
New Hampshire		–		2	–	5	–	1
Villanova		–		3	–	7	–	0
Springfield Training School		–		1	–	5	–	3
NYU		–		0	–	4	–	0

The 1906 Holy Cross football team was an American football team that represented the College of the Holy Cross in the 1906 college football season.

In their only year under head coach George W. King, the Crusaders compiled a 4–3–1 record. George S.L. Connor returned for a second year as the team captain.

Holy Cross played its home games at the Fitton Field baseball stadium on the college campus in Worcester, Massachusetts.

== Schedule ==
Date	Opponent	Site	Result	Attendance	Source
September 29	Massachusetts	Fitton Field; Worcester, MA	W 6–4		
October 6	at Dartmouth	Alumni Oval; Hanover, NH	L 0–16		
October 13	at Yale	Yale Field; New Haven, CT	L 0–17	1,000	
October 20	vs. Maine	Pine Tree Park; Portland, ME	T 0–0	1,000	
October 27	Worcester Tech	Fitton Field; Worcester, MA	W 29–0		
November 3	Fordham	Fitton Field; Worcester, MA (rivalry)	W 8–5		
November 10	at Cornell	Percy Field; Ithaca, NY	L 6–16		
November 29	at Fordham	Polo Grounds; New York, NY (rivalry)	W 15–6	6,000	
