= 1906 Lehigh Brown and White football team =

American college football season

1906 Lehigh Brown and White football
- Conference: Independent
- Record: 5–5–1
- Head coach: Byron W. Dickson (1st season)
- Home stadium: Lehigh Field

1906 Eastern college football independents records
	Conf.			Overall
Team	W	L	T	W		L		T
Princeton		–		9	–	0	–	1
Yale		–		9	–	0	–	1
Haverford		–		7	–	0	–	2
Harvard		–		10	–	1	–	0
Cornell		–		8	–	1	–	2
Lafayette		–		8	–	1	–	1
Penn State		–		8	–	1	–	1
Washington & Jefferson		–		9	–	2	–	0
Swarthmore		–		7	–	2	–	0
Drexel		–		6	–	2	–	0
Tufts		–		6	–	2	–	0
Penn		–		7	–	2	–	3
Carlisle		–		9	–	3	–	0
Brown		–		6	–	3	–	0
Rutgers		–		5	–	2	–	2
Dartmouth		–		6	–	3	–	1
Syracuse		–		6	–	3	–	0
Colgate		–		4	–	2	–	2
Vermont		–		5	–	4	–	0
Fordham		–		5	–	3	–	0
Western U. of Penn.		–		6	–	4	–	0
Holy Cross		–		4	–	3	–	1
Amherst		–		3	–	3	–	1
Lehigh		–		5	–	5	–	1
Bucknell		–		3	–	4	–	1
Dickinson		–		3	–	4	–	2
Carnegie Tech		–		2	–	3	–	2
Army		–		3	–	5	–	1
Frankin & Marshall		–		3	–	5	–	1
Wesleyan		–		2	–	4	–	1
New Hampshire		–		2	–	5	–	1
Villanova		–		3	–	7	–	0
Springfield Training School		–		1	–	5	–	3
NYU		–		0	–	4	–	0

The 1906 Lehigh Brown and White football team was an American football team that represented Lehigh University as an independent during the 1906 college football season. In its first season under head coach Byron W. Dickson, the team compiled a 5–5–1 record and was outscored by a total of 150 to 108. Lehigh played home games at Lehigh Field in Bethlehem, Pennsylvania.

== Schedule ==
Date	Opponent	Site	Result	Source
September 22	Albright	Lehigh Field; Bethlehem, PA	W 21–0	
September 29	at Penn	Franklin Field; Philadelphia, PA	L 6–32	
October 6	George Washington	Lehigh Field; Bethlehem, PA	W 6–0	
October 10	at Princeton	University Field; Princeton, NJ	L 0–52	
October 13	Haverford	Lehigh Field; Bethlehem, PA	L 0–5	
October 20	at Navy	Worden Field; Annapolis, MD	L 0–12	
October 27	at Franklin & Marshall	Lancaster, PA	W 33–0	
November 3	Dickinson	Lehigh Field; Bethlehem, PA	T 0–0	
November 10	NYU	Lehigh Field; Bethlehem, PA	W 27–11	
November 17	Ursinus	Lehigh Field; Bethlehem, PA	W 15–5	
November 24	at Lafayette	Lafayette Field; Easton, PA (rivalry)	L 0–33	
