= 1906 Dartmouth football team =

American college football season

1906 Dartmouth football
- Conference: Independent
- Record: 6–3–1
- Head coach: Fred Folsom (4th season)
- Captain: John Glaze
- Home stadium: Alumni Oval

1906 Eastern college football independents records
	Conf.			Overall
Team	W	L	T	W		L		T
Princeton		–		9	–	0	–	1
Yale		–		9	–	0	–	1
Haverford		–		7	–	0	–	2
Harvard		–		10	–	1	–	0
Cornell		–		8	–	1	–	2
Lafayette		–		8	–	1	–	1
Penn State		–		8	–	1	–	1
Washington & Jefferson		–		9	–	2	–	0
Swarthmore		–		7	–	2	–	0
Drexel		–		6	–	2	–	0
Tufts		–		6	–	2	–	0
Penn		–		7	–	2	–	3
Carlisle		–		9	–	3	–	0
Brown		–		6	–	3	–	0
Rutgers		–		5	–	2	–	2
Dartmouth		–		6	–	3	–	1
Syracuse		–		6	–	3	–	0
Colgate		–		4	–	2	–	2
Vermont		–		5	–	4	–	0
Fordham		–		5	–	3	–	0
Western U. of Penn.		–		6	–	4	–	0
Holy Cross		–		4	–	3	–	1
Amherst		–		3	–	3	–	1
Lehigh		–		5	–	5	–	1
Bucknell		–		3	–	4	–	1
Dickinson		–		3	–	4	–	2
Carnegie Tech		–		2	–	3	–	2
Army		–		3	–	5	–	1
Franklin & Marshall		–		3	–	5	–	1
Wesleyan		–		2	–	4	–	1
New Hampshire		–		2	–	5	–	1
Villanova		–		3	–	7	–	0
Springfield Training School		–		1	–	5	–	3
NYU		–		0	–	4	–	0

The 1906 Dartmouth football team was an American football team that represented Dartmouth College as an independent during the 1906 college football season. In its fourth and final season under head coach Fred Folsom, the team compiled a 6–3–1 record and shut out seven of ten opponents, but was outscored by a total of 87 to 72. Quarterback John Glaze was the team captain. The team played its home games at Alumni Oval in Hanover, New Hampshire.

== Schedule ==
Date	Opponent	Site	Result	Attendance	Source
September 22	Norwich	Alumni Oval; Hanover, NH	W 5–0		
October 3	Vermont	Alumni Oval; Hanover, NH	W 8–0		
October 6	Holy Cross	Alumni Oval; Hanover, NH	W 16–0		
October 13	Maine	Alumni Oval; Hanover, NH	W 4–0		
October 20	Massachusetts	Alumni Oval; Hanover, NH	W 26–0		
October 27	at Williams	Hampden Park; Springfield, MA	T 0–0		
November 3	at Princeton	University Field; Princeton, NJ	L 0–42	8,000	
November 10	at Amherst	Amherst, MA	W 4–0		
November 17	at Harvard	Harvard Stadium; Boston, MA (rivalry)	L 9–22		
November 24	vs. Brown	Hampden Park; Springfield, MA	L 0–23		
