= 1906 Penn State football team =

American college football season

1906 Penn State football
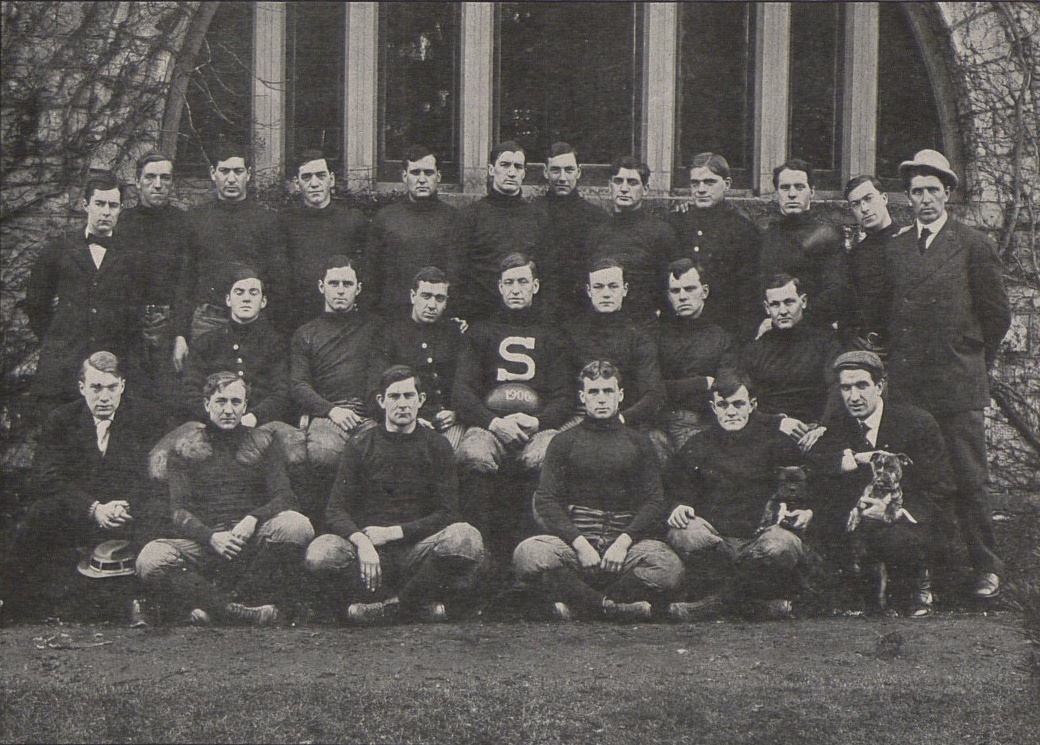
- Conference: Independent
- Record: 8–1–1
- Head coach: Tom Fennell (3rd season)
- Captain: William Thomas Dunn
- Home stadium: Beaver Field

1906 Eastern college football independents records
	Conf.			Overall
Team	W	L	T	W		L		T
Princeton		–		9	–	0	–	1
Yale		–		9	–	0	–	1
Haverford		–		7	–	0	–	2
Harvard		–		10	–	1	–	0
Cornell		–		8	–	1	–	2
Lafayette		–		8	–	1	–	1
Penn State		–		8	–	1	–	1
Washington & Jefferson		–		9	–	2	–	0
Swarthmore		–		7	–	2	–	0
Drexel		–		6	–	2	–	0
Tufts		–		6	–	2	–	0
Penn		–		7	–	2	–	3
Carlisle		–		9	–	3	–	0
Brown		–		6	–	3	–	0
Rutgers		–		5	–	2	–	2
Dartmouth		–		6	–	3	–	1
Syracuse		–		6	–	3	–	0
Colgate		–		4	–	2	–	2
Vermont		–		5	–	4	–	0
Fordham		–		5	–	3	–	0
Western U. of Penn.		–		6	–	4	–	0
Holy Cross		–		4	–	3	–	1
Amherst		–		3	–	3	–	1
Lehigh		–		5	–	5	–	1
Bucknell		–		3	–	4	–	1
Dickinson		–		3	–	4	–	2
Carnegie Tech		–		2	–	3	–	2
Army		–		3	–	5	–	1
Franklin & Marshall		–		3	–	5	–	1
Wesleyan		–		2	–	4	–	1
New Hampshire		–		2	–	5	–	1
Villanova		–		3	–	7	–	0
Springfield Training School		–		1	–	5	–	3
NYU		–		0	–	4	–	0

The 1906 Penn State football team was an American football team that represented Pennsylvania State College—now known as Pennsylvania State University–as an independent during the 1906 college football season. The team was coached by Tom Fennell and played its home games on Beaver Field in State College, Pennsylvania.

== Schedule ==
Date	Opponent	Site	Result	Attendance	Source
September 22	Lebanon Valley	Beaver Field; State College, PA	W 24–0		
September 29	Allegheny	Beaver Field; State College, PA	W 26–0		
October 6	vs. Carlisle	Williamsport, PA	W 4–0		
October 13	Gettysburg	Beaver Field; State College, PA	T 0–0		
October 20	at Yale	Yale Field; New Haven, CT	L 0–10		
November 3	at Navy	Worden Field; Annapolis, MD	W 5–0	5,000	
November 12	Bellefonte Academy	Beaver Field; State College, PA	W 12–0		
November 17	vs. Dickinson	Williamsport, PA	W 6–0	8,000	
November 24	West Virginia	Beaver Field; State College, PA (rivalry)	W 10–0		
November 29	at Western University of Pennsylvania	Exposition Park; Pittsburgh, PA (rivalry)	W 6–0	> 8,000	
