= 1906 NYU Violets football team =

American college football season

1906 NYU Violets football
- Conference: Independent
- Record: 0–4
- Head coach: Douglas Church (1st season)
- Home stadium: Ohio Field

1906 Eastern college football independents records
	Conf.			Overall
Team	W	L	T	W		L		T
Princeton		–		9	–	0	–	1
Yale		–		9	–	0	–	1
Haverford		–		7	–	0	–	2
Harvard		–		10	–	1	–	0
Cornell		–		8	–	1	–	2
Lafayette		–		8	–	1	–	1
Penn State		–		8	–	1	–	1
Washington & Jefferson		–		9	–	2	–	0
Swarthmore		–		7	–	2	–	0
Drexel		–		6	–	2	–	0
Tufts		–		6	–	2	–	0
Penn		–		7	–	2	–	3
Carlisle		–		9	–	3	–	0
Brown		–		6	–	3	–	0
Rutgers		–		5	–	2	–	2
Dartmouth		–		6	–	3	–	1
Syracuse		–		6	–	3	–	0
Colgate		–		4	–	2	–	2
Vermont		–		5	–	4	–	0
Fordham		–		5	–	3	–	0
Western U. of Penn.		–		6	–	4	–	0
Holy Cross		–		4	–	3	–	1
Amherst		–		3	–	3	–	1
Lehigh		–		5	–	5	–	1
Bucknell		–		3	–	4	–	1
Dickinson		–		3	–	4	–	2
Carnegie Tech		–		2	–	3	–	2
Army		–		3	–	5	–	1
Franklin & Marshall		–		3	–	5	–	1
Wesleyan		–		2	–	4	–	1
New Hampshire		–		2	–	5	–	1
Villanova		–		3	–	7	–	0
Springfield Training School		–		1	–	5	–	3
NYU		–		0	–	4	–	0

The 1906 NYU Violets football team was an American football team that represented New York University as an independent during the 1906 college football season. In their only year under head coach Douglas Church, the team compiled a 0–4 record.

== Schedule ==
Date	Opponent	Site	Result	Attendance	Source
October 27	Stevens	Ohio Field; Bronx, NY	L 0–6		
November 6	Rutgers	Ohio Field; Bronx, NY	L 0–15	3,500	
November 10	at Lehigh	Lehigh Field; Bethlehem, PA	L 11–27		
November 24	at Haverford	Walton Field; Haverford, PA	L 0–68		
