= 1906 Lafayette football team =

American college football season

1906 Lafayette football
- Conference: Independent
- Record: 8–1–1
- Head coach: Alfred E. Bull (4th season)
- Captain: Erastus Doud
- Home stadium: March Field

1906 Eastern college football independents records
	Conf.			Overall
Team	W	L	T	W		L		T
Princeton		–		9	–	0	–	1
Yale		–		9	–	0	–	1
Haverford		–		7	–	0	–	2
Harvard		–		10	–	1	–	0
Cornell		–		8	–	1	–	2
Lafayette		–		8	–	1	–	1
Penn State		–		8	–	1	–	1
Washington & Jefferson		–		9	–	2	–	0
Swarthmore		–		7	–	2	–	0
Drexel		–		6	–	2	–	0
Tufts		–		6	–	2	–	0
Penn		–		7	–	2	–	3
Carlisle		–		9	–	3	–	0
Brown		–		6	–	3	–	0
Rutgers		–		5	–	2	–	2
Dartmouth		–		6	–	3	–	1
Syracuse		–		6	–	3	–	0
Colgate		–		4	–	2	–	2
Vermont		–		5	–	4	–	0
Fordham		–		5	–	3	–	0
Western U. of Penn.		–		6	–	4	–	0
Holy Cross		–		4	–	3	–	1
Amherst		–		3	–	3	–	1
Lehigh		–		5	–	5	–	1
Bucknell		–		3	–	4	–	1
Dickinson		–		3	–	4	–	2
Carnegie Tech		–		2	–	3	–	2
Army		–		3	–	5	–	1
Franklin & Marshall		–		3	–	5	–	1
Wesleyan		–		2	–	4	–	1
New Hampshire		–		2	–	5	–	1
Villanova		–		3	–	7	–	0
Springfield Training School		–		1	–	5	–	3
NYU		–		0	–	4	–	0

The 1906 Lafayette football team was an American football team that represented Lafayette College as an independent during the 1906 college football season. In its fourth season under head coach Alfred E. Bull, the team compiled an 8–1–1 record, shut out six opponents, and outscored all opponents by a total of 223 to 36. Erastus Doud was the team captain. The team played its home games at March Field in Easton, Pennsylvania.

== Schedule ==
Date	Opponent	Site	Result	Attendance	Source
September 29	Wyoming Seminary	Easton, PA	W 34–0		
October 6	Ursinus	Easton, PA	W 33–0		
October 13	Medico-Chirurgical	Easton, PA	W 34–0		
October 20	vs. North Carolina	Norfolk, VA	W 28–6		
October 27	Colgate	Easton, PA	W 17–6		
November 3	vs. Washington & Jefferson	Exposition Park; Pittsburgh, PA	W 14–6	2,500	
November 10	at Penn	Franklin Field; Philadelphia, PA	T 0–0		
November 17	Syracuse	Easton, PA	L 4–12		
November 24	Lehigh	Easton, PA (The Rivalry)	W 33–0		
November 29	Dickinson	Easton, PA	W 26–6		
