= 1906 Western University of Pennsylvania football team =

American college football season

1906 Western University of Pennsylvania football
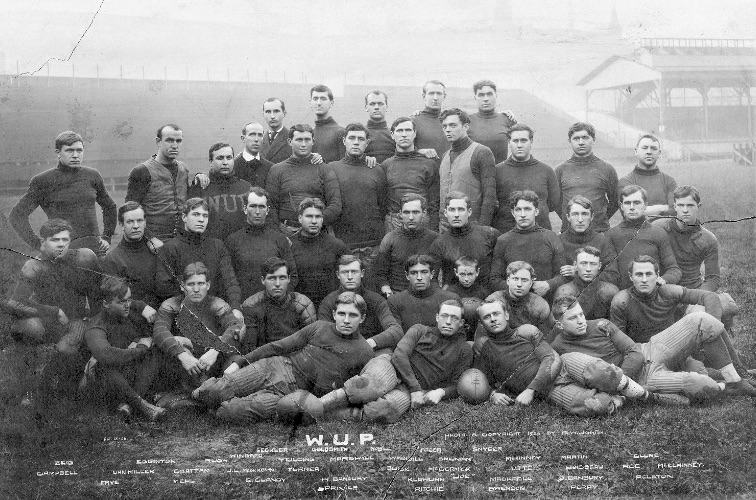
- Conference: Independent
- Record: 7–4
- Head coach: Edgar Wingard (1st season)
- Captain: Gilbert Miller
- Home stadium: Exposition Park

1906 Eastern college football independents records
| | Conf. | | | Overall |
| Team | W | L | T | W | | L | | T |
|---|---|---|---|---|---|---|---|---|
| Princeton | | – | | 9 | – | 0 | – | 1 |
| Yale | | – | | 9 | – | 0 | – | 1 |
| Haverford | | – | | 7 | – | 0 | – | 2 |
| Harvard | | – | | 10 | – | 1 | – | 0 |
| Cornell | | – | | 8 | – | 1 | – | 2 |
| Lafayette | | – | | 8 | – | 1 | – | 1 |
| Penn State | | – | | 8 | – | 1 | – | 1 |
| Washington & Jefferson | | – | | 9 | – | 2 | – | 0 |
| Swarthmore | | – | | 7 | – | 2 | – | 0 |
| Drexel | | – | | 6 | – | 2 | – | 0 |
| Tufts | | – | | 6 | – | 2 | – | 0 |
| Penn | | – | | 7 | – | 2 | – | 3 |
| Carlisle | | – | | 9 | – | 3 | – | 0 |
| Brown | | – | | 6 | – | 3 | – | 0 |
| Rutgers | | – | | 5 | – | 2 | – | 2 |
| Dartmouth | | – | | 6 | – | 3 | – | 1 |
| Syracuse | | – | | 6 | – | 3 | – | 0 |
| Colgate | | – | | 4 | – | 2 | – | 2 |
| Vermont | | – | | 5 | – | 4 | – | 0 |
| Fordham | | – | | 5 | – | 3 | – | 0 |
| Western U. of Penn. | | – | | 6 | – | 4 | – | 0 |
| Holy Cross | | – | | 4 | – | 3 | – | 1 |
| Amherst | | – | | 3 | – | 3 | – | 1 |
| Lehigh | | – | | 5 | – | 5 | – | 1 |
| Bucknell | | – | | 3 | – | 4 | – | 1 |
| Dickinson | | – | | 3 | – | 4 | – | 2 |
| Carnegie Tech | | – | | 2 | – | 3 | – | 2 |
| Army | | – | | 3 | – | 5 | – | 1 |
| Franklin & Marshall | | – | | 3 | – | 5 | – | 1 |
| Wesleyan | | – | | 2 | – | 4 | – | 1 |
| New Hampshire | | – | | 2 | – | 5 | – | 1 |
| Villanova | | – | | 3 | – | 7 | – | 0 |
| Springfield Training School | | – | | 1 | – | 5 | – | 3 |
| NYU | | – | | 0 | – | 4 | – | 0 |

The 1906 Western University of Pennsylvania football team was an American football team that represented Western University of Pennsylvania (later renamed the University of Pittsburgh) as an independent during the 1906 college football season.

== Schedule ==
| Date | Opponent | Site | Result | Attendance | Source |
|---|---|---|---|---|---|
| September 22 | at Butler A.C. | Butler, PA | W 25–0 | 500 | |
| September 29 | Westminster (PA) | Exposition Park; Pittsburgh, PA | W 17–0 | 500 | |
| October 6 | Hiram | Friendship Park; Pittsburgh, PA | W 66–0 | < 300 | |
| October 13 | Allegheny | Exposition Park; Pittsburgh, PA | W 74–0 | 2,500 | |
| October 20 | Carlisle | Exposition Park; Pittsburgh, PA | L 0–22 | 5,000 | |
| October 27 | Carnegie Tech | Exposition Park; Pittsburgh, PA | W 31–0 | 600 | |
| November 3 | at Cornell | Percy Field; Ithaca, NY | L 0–23 | | |
| November 10 | West Virginia | Exposition Park; Pittsburgh, PA (rivalry) | W 17–0 | 1,500 | |
| November 17 | Washington & Jefferson | Exposition Park; Pittsburgh, PA | L 0–4 | 6,000 | |
| November 24 | Grove City | Exposition Park; Pittsburgh, PA | W 24–0 | 300 | |
| November 29 | Penn State | Exposition Park; Pittsburgh, PA (rivalry) | L 0–6 | > 8,000 | |

== Season recap ==
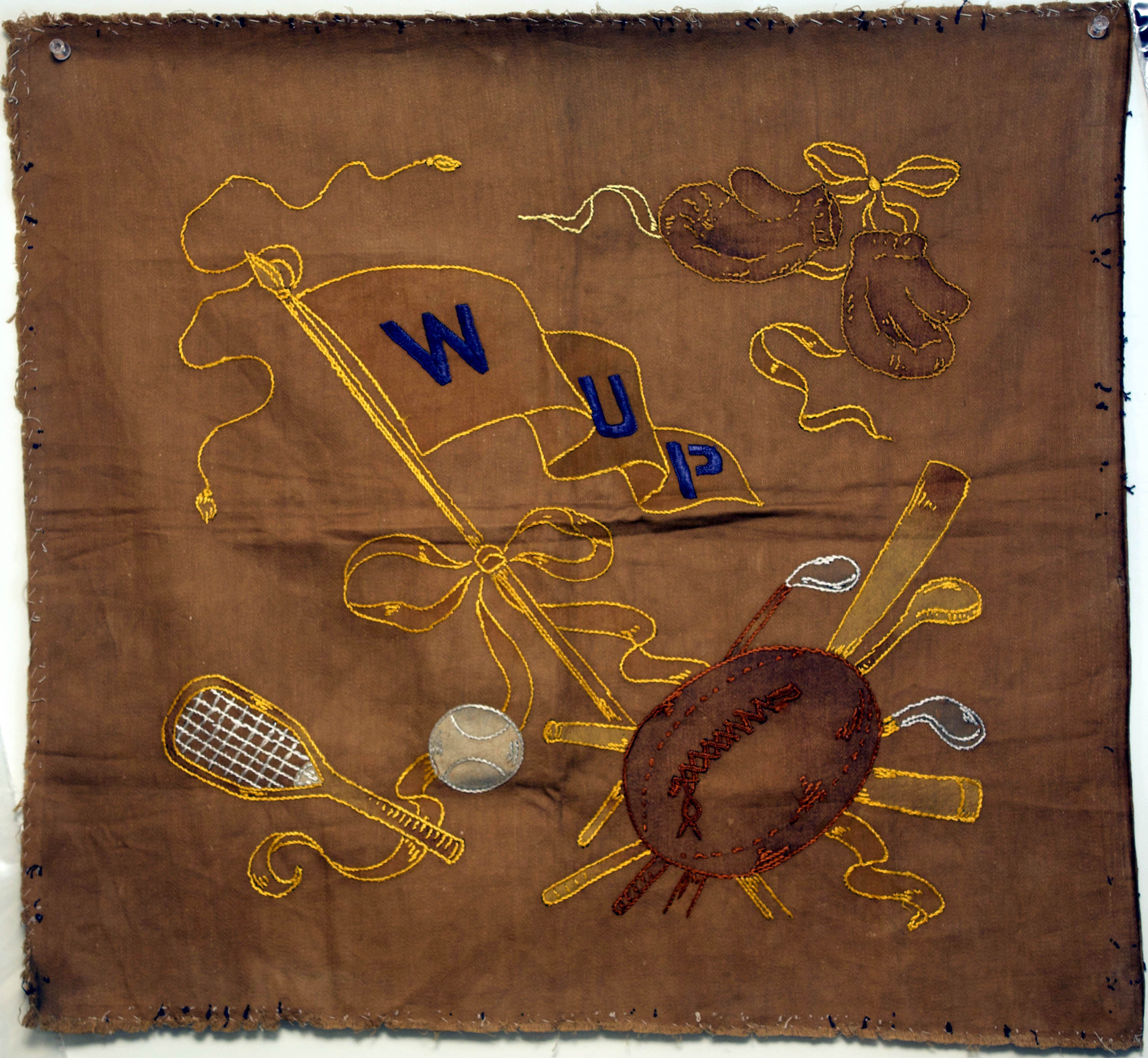
WUP Sports Pillow Cover

The 1905 Western University of Pennsylvania football season was successful record-wise and financially. The Arthur Mosse led team finished the season with an 11–2 record. Its only losses were to Eastern powers Cornell and State College. But two days after the State College defeat newspapers from Philadelphia, Pa. to South Bend, Indiana had headlines describing trouble within the Western University football team. The feud between Coach Mosse and Joe Thompson for control of the team that started at the conclusion of the 1904 season was not settled as satisfactorily as people were led to believe. Joe Thompson and his clique vowed to leave school if Mosse was retained for the 1906 season. Coach Mosse returned to his farm in Kansas and left the coaching decision up to the Athletic Association. Joe Thompson resumed his Law studies and coached the Pittsburgh High School team. Meanwhile, the Athletic Association and Administration of the Western University of Pennsylvania were monitoring the national uproar against football due to nineteen player deaths and over one hundred and thirty serious injuries that occurred during the 1905 season. Columbia, Duke and Northwestern canceled football after the 1905 season. Stanford and Cal switched to the tamer rugby. President Roosevelt encouraged changes in the rules. An intercollegiate conference met and legalized forward passing, abolished mass formations, created the neutral zone line of scrimmage, and designated ten yards to be gained for a first down. The Western University agreed with the rule changes. It adopted a four-year eligibility rule and eliminated professionalism in all their school athletics. The Athletic Association was reorganized to consist of a 13-member committee. Each of the five school departments were represented by a faculty and student member. In addition there was one member from the Board of Trustees, one alumni member and the Chancellor. This committee controlled Athletics at the Western University of Pennsylvania. At the April meeting of the Athletic Association Edgar R. Wingard, the Athletic Director at Butler University, was named Athletic Director and football coach at WUP. Mr. Wingard was a graduate of Susquehanna University and post graduate of Harvard and the University of Pennsylvania. In its first season under head coach Edgar Wingard, the team compiled a 7–4 record, shut out seven of its eleven opponents, and outscored all opponents by a total of 229 to 55.

== Coaching staff ==
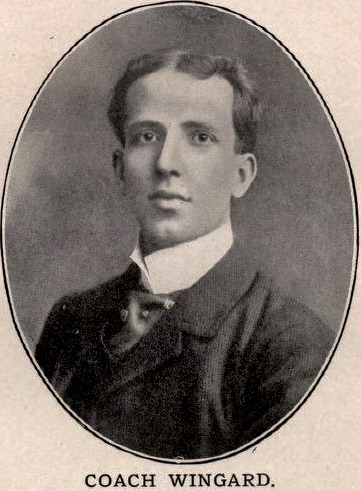
Head Coach Edgar R. Wingard

1906 WUP football staff
| Coaching staff: Edgar Wingard – Head coach; Frank Rugh – Assistant coach; John A. Moorhead – Assistant coach | Support staff: William C. Arthur – Assistant manager |

== Roster ==
1906 Western University of Pennsylvania football roster
| Player | Position | Games | Height | Weight | Class | Prep School | Degree | Residence |
|---|---|---|---|---|---|---|---|---|
| Theodore Perry^ | end | 10 | 5' 8" | 168 | 1907 | Haskell Institute | Associate Dental | Pierre, SD |
| Quincy Banbury | end | 4 | 5' 7" | 155 | 1908 | Salina H.S. (KS) | Doctor of Dental Surgery | Wichita, KS |
| Gilbert Miller | tackle | 3 | 5' 11" | 176 | 1906 | Butler H.S. | Associate Engineering | |
| Leslie Waddill^ | tackle | 8 | 6' | 178 | 1907 | Warrensburg Normal (MO) | Doctor of Dental Surgery | Pittsburgh, PA |
| Waldemar Zieg^ | guard | 8 | 5' 10" | 182 | 1910 | Allegheny H. S. | Engineer of Mines | Pittsburgh, PA |
| C.R. McKinney^ | guard | 10 | 5' 9" | 219 | 1912 | East Liberty Academy | Associate Medical | Dravosburg, PA |
| Paul Vitte | guard | 6 | 5' 8" | 176 | 1907 | Allegheny H.S. | went into business | |
| Homer Roe | end | 3 | 5' 8" | 162 | 1910 | | Doctor of Dental Surgery | Pittsburgh, PA |
| John Shuman^ | lineman | 9 | 6' 2" | 180 | 1910 | | Doctor of Medicine | Sioux City, IA |
| Leo Eggington | lineman | 4 | 6' | 185 | 1907 | | Doctor of Medicine | |
| Arthur Yielding | guard | 8 | 6' | 215 | 1909 | Guthrie H.S. (OK) | Doctor of Medicine | Portland, OR |
| Calvin Marshall^ | tackle | 10 | 6' | 187 | 1908 | Gloucester H.S. (MA) | Doctor of Medicine | Mt. Oliver, PA |
| Jack Turner^ | tackle | 8 | 5' 8" | 189 | 1908 | Salina H.S. (KS) | Associate Law | Gregg, PA |
| Millard Frye | end | 1 | 5' 7" | 168 | 1908 | Carnegie H.S. | Doctor of Dental Surgery | Homer City, PA |
| Edgar Chatham | end | 2 | 5' 7" | 150 | 1909 | Allegheny H.S. | Doctor of Medicine | Pittsburgh, PA |
| Walter Ritchie | quarterback | 5 | 5' 6" | 145 | 1907 | Bloomington Prep, (IL) | Doctor of Dental Surgery | Bloomington, IL |
| Charles Boisseau | quarterback | 4 | 5' 7" | 151 | 1907 | Warrensburg Normal (MO) | Doctor of Dental Surgery | |
| Karl Swenson^ | quarterback | 7 | 5' 8" | 153 | 1908 | Kansas Normal | Doctor of Medicine | Portland, OR |
| Charles Springer^ | halfback | 6 | 5' 10" | 168 | 1908 | Dean Academy | Associate Engineering | Pittsburgh, PA |
| Frederick Klawuhn^ | halfback | 9 | 5' 8" | 170 | 1908 | Ridgeway H.S. | Doctor of Dental Surgery | Ridgeway, PA |
| Winfred Banbury^ | fullback | 7 | 5' 10" | 165 | 1907 | Salina H.S. (KS) | Doctor of Dental Surgery | Pratt, KS |
| Omar Mehl^ | fullback | 9 | 5' 7" | 163 | 1908 | Topeka H.S. (KS) | Doctor of Medicine | Braddock, PA |
| Maurice Goldsmith | end | 1 | 5' 10" | 164 | 1909 | | Doctor of Medicine | Pittsburgh, PA |
| John Mackrell^ | fullback | 8 | 5' 8" | 165 | 1909 | Pittsburgh Academy | Doctor of Medicine | Pittsburgh, PA |
| Samuel Ralston | fullback | 1 | 5' 11" | 170 | 1908 | | Doctor of Dental Surgery | Bellevue, PA |
| Raymond Focer | end | 2 | 5' 10" | 157 | 1910 | | Doctor of Medicine | Colliers, WVA |
| John McElhinney | end | 1 | 5' 9" | 146 | 1909 | | Mechanical Engineer | Youngstown, OH |
| James McCormick^ | halfback | 7 | 5' 11" | 160 | 1906 | Coe College | Associate College/Medical School | |
| Joseph Campbell | fullback | 1 | 5' 10" | 172 | 1909 | | Doctor of Dental Surgery | Woodlawn, PA |
| Irish Clancy^ | halfback | 10 | 6' | 175 | | | | |
| Bert Munhall | center | 1 | 5' 10" | 190 | | | | |
| Maggy Snyder | end | | 5' 8" | 160 | | | | |
| Van Miller | lineman | 1 | 5' 7" | 160 | | | | |
| Ed Noble | end | 2 | 5' 11" | 170 | | | | |
| Martin | lineman | 1 | 5' 9" | 165 | | | | |
| Buck | quarterback | 1 | | | | | | |
| LLoyd McKeown^ | quarterback | 4 | | | | | | |
| A. McKeown | guard | 3 | | | | | | |
^ Lettermen

== Game summaries ==
=== At Butler A. C. ===
WUP at Butler A. C.

| Team | 1 | 2 | Total |
|---|---|---|---|
| • WUP | 10 | 15 | 25 |
| Butler A. C. | 0 | 0 | 0 |

- Date: September 22, 1906
- Location: Butler Grounds
  Butler, PA
- Game attendance: 500
- Referee: Edgar R. Wingard (WUP)

On September 23 Coach Edgar R. Wingard took his team to Butler, Pa. to meet the Butler A.C. WUP received the opening kickoff. With Walter Ritchie at quarterback the offense marched down the field and Winfred Banbury carried the ball into the end zone in the first three minutes. After three possession changes the WUP offense had the ball at midfield. Quincy Banbury proceeded to scamper 55 yards for the second touchdown. The halftime score was 10–0.

Karl Swenson replaced Walter Ritchie at quarterback and Coach Wingard used plenty of substitutes in the second half. Butler started the half by earning their initial first down, but then they were forced to punt. Swenson marched the WUP offense downfield and Fred Klawuhn scored the touchdown. Both Karl Swenson and Charles Springer also scored for the University eleven to make the final score 25–0.

The WUP lineup for the game against Butler A. C. was Quince Banbury (right end), Calvin Marshall (right tackle), Arthur Yielding (right guard), John Turner (center), C. McKinney (left guard), Paul Vitte (left tackle), Ed Noble (left end), Walter Ritchie (quarterback), Winfred Banbury (left halfback), Fred Klawuhn (right halfback), and Omar Mehl (fullback). Substitutions made during the game were: Karl Swenson replaced Walter Ritchie at quarterback; Ted Perry replaced Ed Noble at left end; Gilbert Miller replaced Calvin Marshall at left tackle; John Shuman replaced John Turner at center; James McCormick replaced Quince Banbury at right end; and John Mackrell replaced Omar Mehl at fullback. The game consisted of fifteen minute halves.

=== Westminster ===
Westminster at WUP

| Team | 1 | 2 | Total |
|---|---|---|---|
| Westminster | 0 | 0 | 0 |
| • WUP | 12 | 5 | 17 |

- Date: September 29, 1906
- Location: Exposition Park
  Pittsburgh, PA
- Game attendance: 500
- Referee: Homer N. Young (Gettysburg)

After the rain passed through town on September 29, Westminster College and WUP played the home opener at Exposition Park. The inclement weather kept the attendance to about five hundred loyal students and fans. The offense led by Walter Ritchie took the opening kickoff and marched steadily downfield. John Mackrell scored the first touchdown and Walter Zieg kicked the goal after. After a change of possessions Ritchie was injured and replaced by Karl Swenson. Five plays later Swenson carried the ball into the end zone for the second touchdown in less than 10 minutes. Zieg was successful on the goal kick after. Westminster tried a forward pass but Mackrell intercepted and the half came to an end with WUP ahead 12–0.

The second half was a defensive struggle. Both offenses were able to gain yardage but the defenses would stiffen to stop the drives. Right guard Arthur Yielding hurt his shoulder and was replaced by C. McKinney. Late in the game, Swenson was able to sprint ten yards around end for the final score of the game. Westminster then fooled WUP with a fake punt and gained thirty yards but the WUP defense was able to keep the Titans out of the end zone. The final score was 17–0.

The WUP lineup for the game against Westminster was Quince Banbury (right end), Calvin Marshall (right tackle), Arthur Yielding (right guard), John Shuman (center), Waldy Zieg (left guard), Gilbert Miller (left tackle), Ted Perry (left end), Walter Ritchie (quarterback), John Mackrell (left halfback), Fred Klawuhn (right halfback), and Omar Mehl (fullback). Substitutions made during the game were: Karl Swenson replaced Walter Ritchie at quarterback; C. McKinney replaced Arthur Yielding at right guard; Leslie Waddill replaced Gilbert Miller at left tackle; Munhall replaced John Shuman at center; Charles Springer replaced Omar Mehl at fullback; and Charles Clancey replaced John Mackrell at left halfback. The game consisted of one twenty minute half and one fifteen minute half.

=== Hiram ===
Hiram at WUP

| Team | 1 | 2 | Total |
|---|---|---|---|
| Hiram | 0 | 0 | 0 |
| • WUP | 40 | 26 | 66 |

- Date: October 6, 1906
- Location: Friendship Park
  Pittsburgh, PA
- Game attendance: 300
- Referee: Homer N. Young (Gettysburg)

The Hiram College Terriers football team, after their train arrived several hours late, was welcomed to Pittsburgh by inclement weather and a superior WUP offensive machine. Due to the poor weather, only a few fans were in the Friendship Park bleachers to cheer on their team. The Hiram defense could not stop the WUP offense and gave up twelve touchdowns. The WUP offense tried the forward pass and was very successful. The highlight was Raymond Forcer, WUP substitute end, catching a pass and scampering fifty yards for his first touchdown of the season. Six more players scored touchdowns: Fred Klawuhn and Charles Clancey each scored three; Homer Roe scored two; John Mackrell, James McCormick, and Karl Swenson each scored one. Waldy Zieg added five extra points and Karl Swenson one to reach the final score of 66–0. Coach Wingard substituted so that all twenty-three team members saw playing time. Hiram made one first down the entire game.

The WUP lineup for the game against Hiram was Homer Roe (right end), Calvin Marshall (right tackle), Arthur Yielding (right guard), Paul Vitte (center), Waldy Zieg (left guard), Leslie Waddill (left tackle), Ted Perry (left end), Henry Boisseau (quarterback), John Mackrell (left halfback), Fred Klawuhn (right halfback), and Omar Mehl (fullback). The following substitutes were utilized at some point during the game: James McCormick, Maurice Goldsmith, Leo Eggington, Andrew Martin, John Shuman, C. McKinney, Gilbert Miller, Karl Swenson, Edgar Chatham, Charles Clancey, Ed Noble, and Ray Focer. The game consisted of one twenty-five minute half and one twenty minute half.

=== Allegheny ===
Allegheny at WUP

| Team | 1 | 2 | Total |
|---|---|---|---|
| Allegheny | 0 | 0 | 0 |
| • WUP | 30 | 44 | 74 |

- Date: October 13, 1906
- Location: Exposition Park
  Pittsburgh, PA
- Game attendance: 2,500
- Referee: Homer N. Young (Gettysburg) and W. F. Farrar (U. of Pennsylvania)

October 13 was a beautiful fall day for football. The football field layout at Exposition Park was altered and bleachers erected to give the student section a better view of the on field action. Close to 2,500 fans were in attendance and at least four hundred WUP students were led into the stadium by a marching band and "Chief Rooters" Bill McCandless and Doc Ryder. The opponent was the Allegheny College Methodists from Meadville, PA. Captain Gilbert Miller and John Mackrell were injured and did not play. Calvin Marshall stepped in as acting Captain.

The WUP offense was basically unstoppable as it produced eleven touchdowns. Omar Mehl, Fred Klawuhn and Leo Eggington each scored two. Leslie Waddill, Charles Clancey, Homer Roe, Van Miller and Joseph Campbell each added one. Waldy Zieg had a banner day kicking as he converted eleven goal kicks after and two field goals to personally account for 19 points. The WUP defense held Allegheny to no first downs. The final tally was 74–0. Coach Wingard was able to give everyone some playing time.

The WUP starting lineup for the game against Allegheny was James McCormick (right end), Calvin Marshall (right tackle), Arthur Yielding (right guard), Paul Vitte (center), Waldy Zieg (left guard), Leslie Waddill (left tackle), Ted Perry (left end), Karl Swenson (quarterback), Omar Mehl (left halfback), Fred Klawuhn (right halfback), and Charles Clancey (fullback). The following substitutes were utilized at some point during the game: Leo Eggington, Van Miller, John Shuman, C. McKinney, Homer Roe, Ray Focer, Charles Springer, John McElhinny, Edgar Chatham, and Joseph Campbell. The game consisted of twenty-five minute halves.

=== Carlisle ===
Carlisle at WUP

| Team | 1 | 2 | Total |
|---|---|---|---|
| • Carlisle | 18 | 4 | 22 |
| WUP | 0 | 0 | 0 |

- Date: October 21, 1906
- Location: Exposition Park
  Pittsburgh, PA
- Game attendance: 5,000
- Referee: M. J. Thompson (Georgetown)

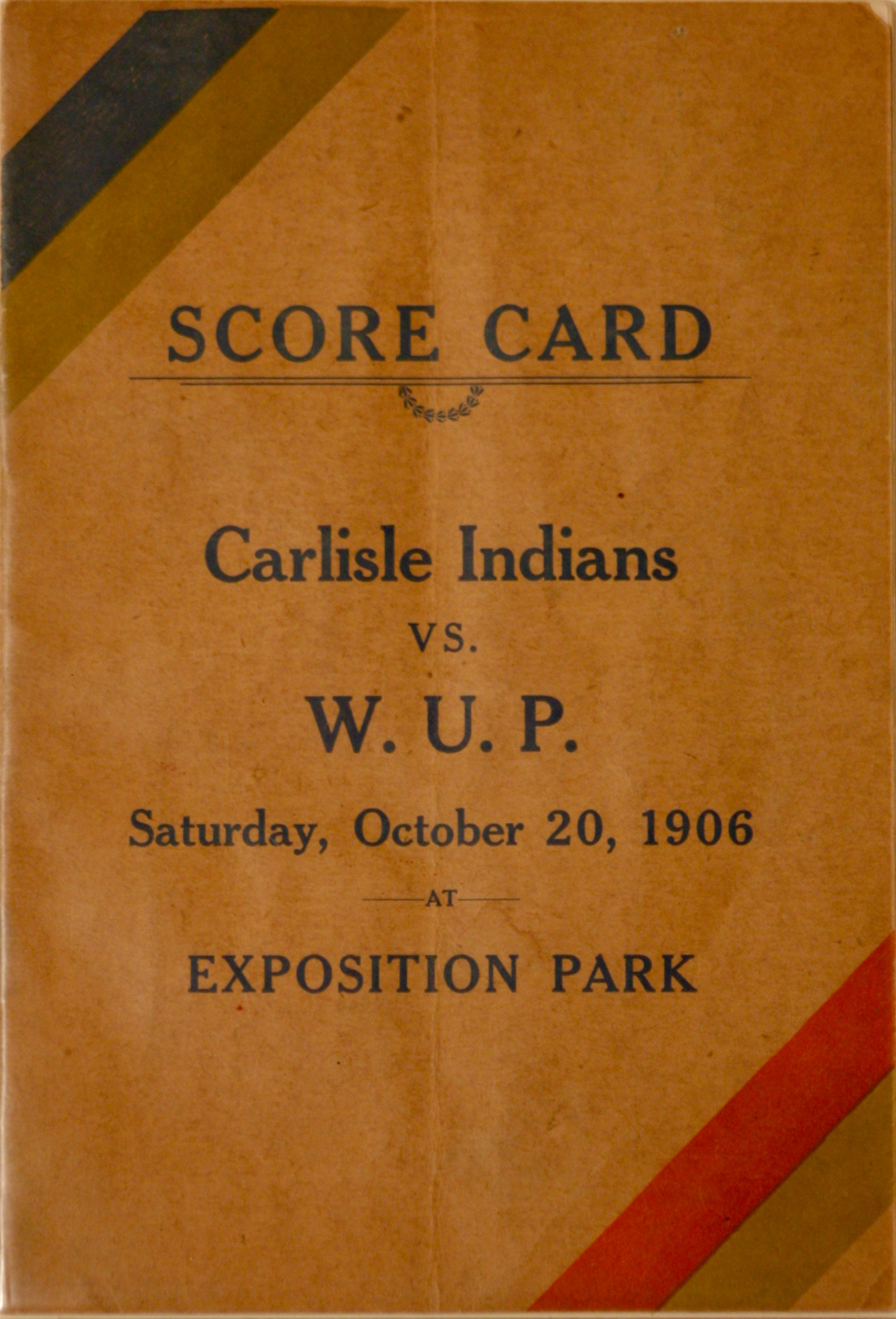
Football Program for 1906 WUP vs. Carlisle Game

Over five thousand fans attended Exposition Park to witness the Bemis Pierce led Carlisle Indians take on Coach Wingard's Western University eleven on Saturday, October 20. The band and students marched through town and into the stadium. Carlisle was the first of the supposed hard games on the WUP schedule for 1906 and the football public were eager to see how the University lads would stack up.

The Pittsburgh Daily Post had the best summation:

"The contest clearly demonstrated the effectiveness of the forward pass when attempted by a fast team. The Indians gave an exhibition of this new play which will be seldom if ever again equaled on a gridiron this season. Time and time again this play proved successful and when line plunges were needed the WUP line was unable to withstand the redskin onslaught. That the university line needs strengthening there is no doubt, and if a respectable showing is expected against Wash-Jeff and State considerable changing will be necessary.

The defeat of the local lads was a bitter pill for the spectators, but it was somewhat atoned for by the first-class exhibition on the part of the Carlisle men. The forward pass and the onside kick, as well as an exhibition of field goal kicking was included in their repertoire. When it is considered that the three men in the backfield, as well as five men on the line can negotiate 100 yards in 10.5 seconds or less, the agility of the entire Indian team can be understood."

On the Western U.'s second possession Karl Swenson fumbled and Carlisle halfback Mt. Pleasant recovered. The Carlisle offense quickly advanced the ball to the WUP ten yard line. Three plays later Gardiner plunged into the end zone from the one for the Indians first touchdown. Mt. Pleasant kicked the goal after. Walter Ritchie replaced an injured Karl Swenson at quarterback but the WUP offense had to punt the ball back to Carlisle. A forward pass advanced the ball deep into WUP territory and two running plays later Wauseka was in the end zone for the second Carlisle touchdown. Mt. Pleasant booted the ball through the uprights and Carlisle led 12–0. After an exchange of punts, Carlisle had the ball on the WUP fifty yard line. Five plays later Little Boy plowed through the center of the WUP defensive line for a six-yard touchdown and Mt. Pleasant capped the first half scoring with his third goal after.

The WUP offense did not fare any better in the second half against the strong Carlisle defense. The WUP defense played better and only gave up a thirty-yard field goal by quarterback Libby. The final score read Carlisle 22 – WUP 0.

The WUP starting lineup for the game against Carlisle was Quince Banbury (right end), Calvin Marshall (right tackle), Arthur Yielding (right guard), Paul Vitte (center), Waldy Zieg (left guard), Leslie Waddill (left tackle), Ted Perry (left end), Karl Swenson (quarterback), Omar Mehl (left halfback), Fred Klawuhn (right halfback), and Winfred Banbury (fullback). The following substitutes were utilized at some point during the game: John Turner, Charles Springer, John Mackrell, Charles Clancey, McKeown, John Shuman, Walter Ritchie, and James McCormick. The game consisted of twenty-five minute halves.

=== Carnegie Tech ===
Carnegie Tech at WUP

| Team | 1 | 2 | Total |
|---|---|---|---|
| Carnegie Tech | 0 | 0 | 0 |
| • WUP | 5 | 26 | 31 |

- Date: October 27, 1906
- Location: Exposition Park
  Pittsburgh, PA
- Game attendance: 600
- Referee: Harry C. Fry Jr. (Carnegie Tech)

The first meeting with city rival Carnegie Tech took place on October 27, 1906 at Exposition Park in the rain, sleet, and snow. Carnegie Tech opened for business in 1905 and started football in 1906, by popular demand of the student body. Dr. Challinor was the first coach. Attendance was sparse, but the enthusiasts were treated to a tight first half. The WUP was only able to score one touchdown in the first half. Defense ruled as neither offense could generate any sustained drive in the inclement weather. WUP tackle Leslie Waddill fell on a Tartan fumble in the end zone for the lone WUP score.

Coach Wingard changed the lineup for the second half. Walter Ritchie replaced Henry Boisseau at quarterback and led the team on four touchdown drives. McKeown replaced Irish Clancy at fullback and scored the first touchdown of the second half. Winfred Banbury, Homer Roe and Johnny Mackrell scored the other touchdowns. McKeown added a field goal and two goal kicks after to make the final score 31–0 in favor of WUP.

In spite of the lopsided score, the WUP coach was not happy with the line play and on Monday October 29 hired John A. Moorhead, former Yale player, as assistant coach. The media and fans were used to the WUP offense running up the score on weak teams. The Pittsburgh Press headline read: "Poor Play By The WUP Team - Did Not Try Very Hard Against Carnegie Technical School- Scored Once in First Half."

The WUP starting lineup for the game against the Tartans was Jay Frye (right end), Leo Eggington (right tackle), Arthur Yielding (right guard), John Turner (center), Waldy Zieg (left guard), Leslie Waddill (left tackle), James McCormick (left end), Henry Boisseau (quarterback), Charles Springer (left halfback), Winfred Banbury (right halfback), and Charles Clancey (fullback). Substitutions made during the game were: C. McKinney replaced Waldy Zieg at left guard; Walter Ritchie replaced Henry Boisseau at quarterback; Paul Vitte replaced Leo Eggington at right tackle; Homer Roe replaced Jay Frye at right end; John Mackrell replaced Charles Springer at left halfback; and McKeown replaced Charles Clancy at fullback. The game consisted of twenty minute halves.

=== At Cornell ===
WUP at Cornell

| Team | 1 | 2 | Total |
|---|---|---|---|
| WUP | 0 | 0 | 0 |
| • Cornell | 11 | 12 | 23 |

- Date: November 3, 1906
- Location: Percy Field
  Ithaca, NY
- Referee: E. F. Southworth (Harvard)

On November 3 the WUP lads traveled to Ithaca, N.Y. to play the strong Cornell team led by coach Glenn Warner. Cornell received the opening kick off and was forced to punt by the WUP defense. WUP fumbled the punt and Cornell recovered. The WUP defense held and forced a punt but quarterback Walter Ritchie was tackled in the end zone for a safety. The Big Red then marched down the field and scored on a forward pass to Earle from three yards out. Cook was successful on the goal kick after. Winfred Banbury gave the WUP fans hope as he dashed forty yards with an interception, but the offense could not penetrate the Cornell defense. Late in the first half Cornell fullback Walders kicked a fifty-yard field goal to make the score 12–0 at the break.

Cornell scored on their first possession of the second half. Halfback Earle raced around right end for a forty-five yard touchdown. After recovering a WUP fumble, Cornell scored its final touchdown on a pass play to Gibson. Cook was again good on the goal kick after and the final tally was 23–0. Cornell would finish the season with an 8–1–2 record.

The WUP starting lineup[ for the Cornell game was Fred Klawuhn (right end), Calvin Marshall (right tackle), John Shuman (right guard), John Turner (center), Waldy Zieg (left guard), Leslie Waddill (left tackle), Ted Perry (left end), Walter Ritchie (quarterback), Omar Mehl (left halfback), Winfred Banbury (right halfback), and Charles Clancey (fullback). The only substitution made was C. McKinney replaced John Shuman at center. The game consisted of one twenty-five minute half and one twenty minute half.

=== West Virginia ===
West Virginia at WUP

| Team | 1 | 2 | Total |
|---|---|---|---|
| West Virginia | 0 | 0 | 0 |
| • WUP | 11 | 6 | 17 |

- Date: November 10, 1906
- Location: Exposition Park
  Pittsburgh, PA
- Game attendance: 1,500
- Referee: Edward P. Young (Cornell)

The eighth edition of the “Backyard Brawl” took place on November 10 at Exposition Park. The ladies from the Pennsylvania College for Women and all Pittsburgh area high school seniors were guests of the University. Fifteen hundred students and fans braved the blustery winds and cheered on their team. The WUP team was heavily favored. Coach Wingard did not use his first string backfield because the Washington & Jefferson game was next on the schedule. The WUP offense led by substitute quarterback McKeown managed to score three touchdowns and win the game 17–0.

On the WUPs first possession, halfback Charles Springer plunged into the end zone for the first touchdown. Halfback Winfred Banbury scored on a pass play late in the first half and fullback Clancy raced sixty-five yards for the last score late in the second half. The WUP defense played well and shut out their sixth opponent.

The Pittsburgh Press was critical in the recap:

"WUP showed disheartening form yesterday in the game with West Virginia University, and while they managed to defeat the up-river boys by the score of 17–0 the result was far from pleasing to the local adherents in view of the crucial test to come next Saturday in the Washington and Jefferson game. The representatives of the Blue and Gold played ragged football from the time the whistle blew for the kick-off, and while there were flashes of good football displayed by them, as a rule they did not play anything like the game they are capable of. The chief trouble was their proneness to fumble, especially at critical times. By hard work they would manage to rush the ball down to within striking distance of the coveted goal, when then chance to score would be thrown to the winds by a miserable fumble or bad play....The public pay to see good football and do not relish the idea of paying good prices to see a team composed mostly of scrub players go up against a team of the caliber of that of the West Virginia University. Had the regular team been in the game the score should have been at least double what it was, and the public would have been satisfied that they had witnessed a good exhibition of the fascinating sport."

The starting lineup for the game against West Virginia was Fred Klawuhn (right end), Calvin Marshall (right tackle), C. McKinney (right guard), John Turner (center), A. McKeown (left guard), Leslie Waddill (left tackle), Ted Perry (left end), S. McKeown (quarterback), Charles Springer (left halfback), Winfred Banbury (right halfback), and Charles Clancey (fullback). Substitutions made during the game were: John Shuman replaced A. McKeown at left guard; John Mackrell replaced Charles Springer at left halfback; and Paul Vitte replaced Leslie Waddill at left tackle. The game consisted of one twenty-five minute half and one twenty minute half.

=== Washington & Jefferson ===
W & J at WUP

| Team | 1 | 2 | Total |
|---|---|---|---|
| • W & J | 0 | 4 | 4 |
| WUP | 0 | 0 | 0 |

- Date: November 17, 1906
- Location: Exposition Park
  Pittsburgh, PA
- Game attendance: 6,000
- Referee: Nathan P. Stauffer (U. of Pennsylvania)

The Washington & Jefferson Red and Black football squad traveled to Pittsburgh for the second year in a row to do battle with the Western University lads. The 6,000 fans who braved another rainy Saturday were treated to a great defensive game. The WUP offense spent most of the first half in W & J's territory but were unable to score. Penalties and fumbles stymied both teams' efforts. Both defenses continued to do well in the second half. Late in the game umpire Okeson called slugging against WUP halfback Lloyd McKeown. The assessment was half the distance to the goal, which placed the ball on the WUP twenty yard line. The Red and Black worked the ball to the twelve yard line and Kerr Price tried a field goal. Omar Mehl blocked the kick but WUP was offside. Mr. Price was successful on his second try and broke the scoreless tie. In the waning moments of the game, the WUP offense rushed the ball to the Red and Black four yard line. Omar Mehl was unable to penetrate the Red and Black defense as time ran out. The final read 4–0 in favor of Washington & Jefferson.

The Pittsburgh Press contained a more upbeat recap:

"Although defeated, W. U. P. was by no means disgraced, and the showing they made against the team which had been touted as an easy winner was indeed remarkable. Their line held like a stone wall, and the Red and Black men soon found this out to their sorrow. Time and again they would throw their backs against the mighty line of nerve and muscle, but the impression they would make could hardly be noticed."

The usual gesture at the conclusion of this rivalry game was the rewarding of the game ball to the victorious team. Neither the WUP Captain nor Coach Wingard handed the ball to the Red and Black after the game and the newspapers criticized the WUPs for unsportsmanlike conduct. Finally on Tuesday Coach Wingard had Manager Arthur mail the ball to Coach Piekarski.

The WUP starting lineup for the game against Washington & Jefferson was Fred Klawuhn (right end), Calvin Marshall (right tackle), C. McKinney (right guard), John Turner (center), Waldy Zieg (left guard), Charles Clancey (left tackle), Ted Perry (left end), Karl Swenson (quarterback), Lloyd McKeown (left halfback), Winfred Banbury (right halfback), and Omar Mehl (fullback). Substitutions made during the game were Henry Boisseau replaced Karl Swenson at quarterback and John Mackrell replaced Lloyd McKeown at left halfback. The game consisted of thirty minute halves.

=== Grove City ===
Grove City at WUP

| Team | 1 | 2 | Total |
|---|---|---|---|
| Grove City | 0 | 0 | 0 |
| • WUP | 12 | 12 | 24 |

- Date: November 24, 1906
- Location: Exposition Park
  Pittsburgh, PA
- Game attendance: 300
- Referee: Homer N. Young (Gettysburg)

On November 24 approximately three hundred die-hard fans braved the cold and strong wind to watch WUP play the Grove City Wolverines. Coach Wingard used plenty of substitutes to keep the WUPs healthy for the upcoming State College game. Halfback John Mackrell was the offensive star of the game, as he rushed for three touchdowns. He scored two in the first half. The first was on a forty-yard scamper and he bettered that two minutes later with a seventy yard touchdown jaunt. The score at halftime was 12–0 in favor of WUP.

Grove City was able to move the ball offensively but the WUP defense kept them out of the end zone. Both Grove City and WUP missed field goals and had problems with fumbling. Mackrell and Ralston scored second half touchdowns for the WUP eleven on short line plunges to make the final score 24–0. The WUP defense recorded its seventh shutout of the season.

The WUP lineup for the game against Grove City was James McCormick (right end), Calvin Marshall (right tackle), Artur Yielding (right guard), John Turner (center), C. McKinney (left guard), Charles Clancey (left tackle), Ted Perry (left end), Henry Boisseau (quarterback), Lloyd McKeown (left halfback), John Mackrell (right halfback), and Omar Mehl (fullback). The following players were substituted into the game: Homer Roe, Leslie Waddill, John Shuman, Leo Eggington, Quince Banbury, Buck, Charles Springer, and Samuel Ralston. The game consisted of twenty minute halves.

=== Penn State ===
Penn State at WUP

| Team | 1 | 2 | Total |
|---|---|---|---|
| • Penn State | 0 | 6 | 6 |
| WUP | 0 | 0 | 0 |

- Date: November 130, 1906
- Location: Exposition Park
  Pittsburgh, PA
- Game attendance: 8,000
- Referee: Nathan P. Stauffer (U. of Pennsylvania)

More than eight thousand fans spent their Thanksgiving Day at Exposition Park. They watched the WUP football team battle the visiting (7–1–1) State College eleven. State College's only blemishes on their record were a 10–0 loss to Yale (9–0–1) and a tie with Gettysburg (7–1–2). The entire game was a defensive struggle. In the first half State College had the ball inside the ten yard line twice but the WUP defense stiffened with two goal line stands. State College also missed two first half field goals.

The WUP offense managed to get into field goal range three times in the second half but could not convert. For fifty seven minutes the teams played to a scoreless tie until Winfred Banbury, WUP halfback, was penalized for slugging and sent to the bench. The assessment was half the distance to the goal, which placed the ball on the WUP nine yard line. State halfback Bill McCleary carried the ball into the end zone on third down and kicked the goal after for a 6–0 State College lead. The game ended some seconds later.

The WUP starting lineup for the game against Penn State was Fred Klawuhn (right end), Calvin Marshall (right tackle), C. McKinney (right guard), John Turner (center), Waldy Zieg (left guard), Charles Clancey (left tackle), Ted Perry (left end), Karl Swenson (quarterback), Lloyd McKeown (left halfback), Winfred Banbury (right halfback), and Omar Mehl (fullback). The following substitutions were made during the game: John Shuman replaced C. McKinney at right guard; John Mackrell replaced Winfred Banbury at right halfback; Arthur Yielding replaced John Shuman at right guard; and James McCormick replaced Fred Klawuhn at right end. The game consisted of thirty minute halves.

== Scoring summary ==
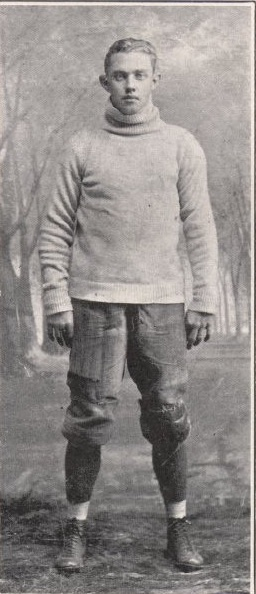
Assistant coach John A. Moorhead

1906 Western University of Pennsylvania scoring summary
| Player | Touchdowns | Extra points | Field goals | Points |
|---|---|---|---|---|
| John Mackrell | 7 | 0 | 0 | 35 |
| Fred Klawuhn | 6 | 0 | 0 | 30 |
| Waldemar Zieg | 0 | 18 | 2 | 26 |
| Charles Clancey | 5 | 0 | 0 | 25 |
| Karl Swenson | 4 | 1 | 0 | 21 |
| Homer Roe | 4 | 0 | 0 | 20 |
| Lloyd McKeown | 1 | 7 | 1 | 16 |
| Winfred Banbury | 3 | 0 | 0 | 15 |
| Leo Eggington | 2 | 0 | 0 | 10 |
| Leslie Waddill | 2 | 0 | 0 | 10 |
| Charles Springer | 2 | 0 | 0 | 10 |
| Omar Mehl | 2 | 0 | 0 | 10 |
| Samuel Ralston | 1 | 1 | 0 | 6 |
| Quince Banbury | 1 | 0 | 0 | 5 |
| Joe Campbell | 1 | 0 | 0 | 5 |
| Raymond Forcer | 1 | 0 | 0 | 5 |
| Van Miller | 1 | 0 | 0 | 5 |
| Totals | 43 | 27 | 3 | 254 |
