= 1906 Rutgers Queensmen football team =

American college football season

1906 Rutgers Queensmen football
- Conference: Independent
- Record: 5–2–2
- Head coach: Frank Gorton (1st season)
- Captain: Douglas J. Fisher
- Home stadium: Neilson Field

1906 Eastern college football independents records
	Conf.			Overall
Team	W	L	T	W		L		T
Princeton		–		9	–	0	–	1
Yale		–		9	–	0	–	1
Haverford		–		7	–	0	–	2
Harvard		–		10	–	1	–	0
Cornell		–		8	–	1	–	2
Lafayette		–		8	–	1	–	1
Penn State		–		8	–	1	–	1
Washington & Jefferson		–		9	–	2	–	0
Swarthmore		–		7	–	2	–	0
Drexel		–		6	–	2	–	0
Tufts		–		6	–	2	–	0
Penn		–		7	–	2	–	3
Carlisle		–		9	–	3	–	0
Brown		–		6	–	3	–	0
Rutgers		–		5	–	2	–	2
Dartmouth		–		6	–	3	–	1
Syracuse		–		6	–	3	–	0
Colgate		–		4	–	2	–	2
Vermont		–		5	–	4	–	0
Fordham		–		5	–	3	–	0
Western U. of Penn.		–		6	–	4	–	0
Holy Cross		–		4	–	3	–	1
Amherst		–		3	–	3	–	1
Lehigh		–		5	–	5	–	1
Bucknell		–		3	–	4	–	1
Dickinson		–		3	–	4	–	2
Carnegie Tech		–		2	–	3	–	2
Army		–		3	–	5	–	1
Franklin & Marshall		–		3	–	5	–	1
Wesleyan		–		2	–	4	–	1
New Hampshire		–		2	–	5	–	1
Villanova		–		3	–	7	–	0
Springfield Training School		–		1	–	5	–	3
NYU		–		0	–	4	–	0

The 1906 Rutgers Queensmen football team represented Rutgers University as an independent during the 1906 college football season. In their first season under head coach Frank Gorton, the Queensmen compiled a 5–2–2 record and outscored their opponents, 123 to 30. The team captain was Douglas J. Fisher.

== Schedule ==
Date	Opponent	Site	Result	Source
September 29	Fordham	Neilson Field; New Brunswick, NJ	W 6–0	
October 6	at Stevens	Stevens Field; Hoboken, NJ	T 0–0	
October 13	at Villanova	Villanova, PA	L 0–17	
October 20	at Haverford	Walton Field; Haverford, PA	T 0–0	
October 27	Delaware	Neilson Field; New Brunswick, NJ	L 0–4	
November 6	at NYU	Ohio Field; Bronx, NY	W 14–0	
November 10	CCNY	Neilson Field; New Brunswick, NJ	W 55–0	
November 17	Stevens	Neilson Field; New Brunswick, NJ	W 18–4	
November 24	Ursinus	Neilson Field; New Brunswick, NJ	W 29–5	
