= 1906 Washington & Jefferson Red and Black football team =

American college football season

1906 Washington & Jefferson Red and Black football
- Conference: Independent
- Record: 9–2
- Head coach: Frank Piekarski (2nd season)

1906 Eastern college football independents records
	Conf.			Overall
Team	W	L	T	W		L		T
Princeton		–		9	–	0	–	1
Yale		–		9	–	0	–	1
Haverford		–		7	–	0	–	2
Harvard		–		10	–	1	–	0
Cornell		–		8	–	1	–	2
Lafayette		–		8	–	1	–	1
Penn State		–		8	–	1	–	1
Washington & Jefferson		–		9	–	2	–	0
Swarthmore		–		7	–	2	–	0
Drexel		–		6	–	2	–	0
Tufts		–		6	–	2	–	0
Penn		–		7	–	2	–	3
Carlisle		–		9	–	3	–	0
Brown		–		6	–	3	–	0
Rutgers		–		5	–	2	–	2
Dartmouth		–		6	–	3	–	1
Syracuse		–		6	–	3	–	0
Colgate		–		4	–	2	–	2
Vermont		–		5	–	4	–	0
Fordham		–		5	–	3	–	0
Western U. of Penn.		–		6	–	4	–	0
Holy Cross		–		4	–	3	–	1
Amherst		–		3	–	3	–	1
Lehigh		–		5	–	5	–	1
Bucknell		–		3	–	4	–	1
Dickinson		–		3	–	4	–	2
Carnegie Tech		–		2	–	3	–	2
Army		–		3	–	5	–	1
Franklin & Marshall		–		3	–	5	–	1
Wesleyan		–		2	–	4	–	1
New Hampshire		–		2	–	5	–	1
Villanova		–		3	–	7	–	0
Springfield Training School		–		1	–	5	–	3
NYU		–		0	–	4	–	0

The 1906 Washington & Jefferson Red and Black football team represented Washington & Jefferson College as an independent during the 1906 college football season. Led by second-year head Frank Piekarski, Washington & Jefferson compiled a record of 9–2.

== Schedule ==
Date	Opponent	Site	Result	Attendance	Source
October 3	California YMCA	Washington, PA	W 24–0		
October 6	at Princeton	Princeton, NJ	L 0–6		
October 13	Westminster (PA)	Washington, PA	W 14–0		
October 17	Grove City	Washington, PA	W 76–0		
October 20	Denison	Washington, PA	W 29–0		
October 27	Dickinson	Washington, PA	W 2–0		
November 3	vs. Lafayette	Exposition Park; Pittsburgh, PA	L 6–14	2,500	
November 10	Ohio Medical	Washington, PA	W 16–0		
November 17	at Western University of Pennsylvania	Exposition Park; Pittsburgh, PA	W 4–0	6,000	
November 24	Carnegie Tech	Washington, PA	W 35–0		
November 29	West Virginia	Washington, PA	W 29–6		
