= 1906 Colgate football team =

American college football season

1906 Colgate football
- Conference: Independent
- Record: 4–2–2
- Head coach: Bill Warner (1st season)
- Captain: Ralph Knapp
- Home stadium: Whitnall Field

1906 Eastern college football independents records
	Conf.			Overall
Team	W	L	T	W		L		T
Princeton		–		9	–	0	–	1
Yale		–		9	–	0	–	1
Haverford		–		7	–	0	–	2
Harvard		–		10	–	1	–	0
Cornell		–		8	–	1	–	2
Lafayette		–		8	–	1	–	1
Penn State		–		8	–	1	–	1
Washington & Jefferson		–		9	–	2	–	0
Swarthmore		–		7	–	2	–	0
Drexel		–		6	–	2	–	0
Tufts		–		6	–	2	–	0
Penn		–		7	–	2	–	3
Carlisle		–		9	–	3	–	0
Brown		–		6	–	3	–	0
Rutgers		–		5	–	2	–	2
Dartmouth		–		6	–	3	–	1
Syracuse		–		6	–	3	–	0
Colgate		–		4	–	2	–	2
Vermont		–		5	–	4	–	0
Fordham		–		5	–	3	–	0
Western U. of Penn.		–		6	–	4	–	0
Holy Cross		–		4	–	3	–	1
Amherst		–		3	–	3	–	1
Lehigh		–		5	–	5	–	1
Bucknell		–		3	–	4	–	1
Dickinson		–		3	–	4	–	2
Carnegie Tech		–		2	–	3	–	2
Army		–		3	–	5	–	1
Franklin & Marshall		–		3	–	5	–	1
Wesleyan		–		2	–	4	–	1
New Hampshire		–		2	–	5	–	1
Villanova		–		3	–	7	–	0
Springfield Training School		–		1	–	5	–	3
NYU		–		0	–	4	–	0

The 1906 Colgate football team was an American football team that represented Colgate University as an independent during the 1906 college football season. In its first season under head coach Bill Warner, the team compiled a 4–2–2 record. Ralph Knapp was the team captain. The team played its home games on Whitnall Field in Hamilton, New York.

== Schedule ==
Date	Opponent	Site	Result	Attendance	Source
September 29	at Cornell	Percy Field; Ithaca, NY (rivalry)	T 0–0		
October 6	at Rochester	Culver Park; Rochester, NY	W 18–0		
October 10	Hobart	Whitnall Field; Hamilton, NY	W 29–0		
October 13	at Army	The Plain; West Point, NY	T 0–0		
October 20	at Syracuse	Syracuse, NY (rivalry)	W 5–0	8,000	
October 27	at Lafayette	Easton, PA	L 6–17		
November 3	at Williams	Williamstown, MA	L 9–23		
November 10	at Hamilton	Clinton, NY	W 35–16		
