= 1906 Drexel Dragons football team =

American collegiate football season

1906 Drexel Dragons football
- Conference: Independent
- Record: 6–2
- Head coach: None

1906 Eastern college football independents records
	Conf.			Overall
Team	W	L	T	W		L		T
Princeton		–		9	–	0	–	1
Yale		–		9	–	0	–	1
Haverford		–		7	–	0	–	2
Harvard		–		10	–	1	–	0
Cornell		–		8	–	1	–	2
Lafayette		–		8	–	1	–	1
Penn State		–		8	–	1	–	1
Washington & Jefferson		–		9	–	2	–	0
Swarthmore		–		7	–	2	–	0
Drexel		–		6	–	2	–	0
Tufts		–		6	–	2	–	0
Penn		–		7	–	2	–	3
Carlisle		–		9	–	3	–	0
Brown		–		6	–	3	–	0
Rutgers		–		5	–	2	–	2
Dartmouth		–		6	–	3	–	1
Syracuse		–		6	–	3	–	0
Colgate		–		4	–	2	–	2
Vermont		–		5	–	4	–	0
Fordham		–		5	–	3	–	0
Western U. of Penn.		–		6	–	4	–	0
Holy Cross		–		4	–	3	–	1
Amherst		–		3	–	3	–	1
Lehigh		–		5	–	5	–	1
Bucknell		–		3	–	4	–	1
Dickinson		–		3	–	4	–	2
Carnegie Tech		–		2	–	3	–	2
Army		–		3	–	5	–	1
Franklin & Marshall		–		3	–	5	–	1
Wesleyan		–		2	–	4	–	1
New Hampshire		–		2	–	5	–	1
Villanova		–		3	–	7	–	0
Springfield Training School		–		1	–	5	–	3
NYU		–		0	–	4	–	0

The 1906 Drexel Dragons football team did not have a head coach.

== Schedule ==
Date	Opponent	Site	Result
October 9	Central High School	Baker Bowl; Philadelphia, PA	L 0–5
October 13	at Atlantic City High School	Atlantic City, NJ	W 23–0
October 26	at Radnor High School	Wayne, PA	W 16–0
October 27	at Pennsylvania Military	Chester, PA	W 0–17
October 30	at William Penn Charter School	Queen Lane; Philadelphia, PA	L 0–12
November 10	at Pennsylvania Military	Chester, PA	W 12–5
Unknown	Northeast Manual Training School		W 6–0
Unknown	Drexel Alumni*	Philadelphia, PA	W 12–0
*Non-conference game

== Roster ==
1906 Drexel Dragons football team roster
Players
Coaches
Offense

Pos.	#	Name	Class
TE		Knox
OT		McCleary
G		Caine
C		Buckingham
G		Loveland
OT		J.H. Fenton
TE		Gugler
HB		Remington
HB		Daddon
FB		Kline
		Peech
		Selby

Defense

Pos.	#	Name	Class

Special teams

Pos.	#	Name	Class

Head coach

Coordinators/assistant coaches

Legend

- (C) Team captain
- (S) Suspended
- (I) Ineligible
- Injured
- Redshirt
