= 1906 Syracuse Orangemen football team =

American college football season

1906 Syracuse Orangemen football
- Conference: Independent
- Record: 6–3
- Head coach: Frank "Buck" O'Neill (1st season)
- Captain: James Stimson
- Home stadium: Old Oval

1906 Eastern college football independents records
	Conf.			Overall
Team	W	L	T	W		L		T
Princeton		–		9	–	0	–	1
Yale		–		9	–	0	–	1
Haverford		–		7	–	0	–	2
Harvard		–		10	–	1	–	0
Cornell		–		8	–	1	–	2
Lafayette		–		8	–	1	–	1
Penn State		–		8	–	1	–	1
Washington & Jefferson		–		9	–	2	–	0
Swarthmore		–		7	–	2	–	0
Drexel		–		6	–	2	–	0
Tufts		–		6	–	2	–	0
Penn		–		7	–	2	–	3
Carlisle		–		9	–	3	–	0
Brown		–		6	–	3	–	0
Rutgers		–		5	–	2	–	2
Dartmouth		–		6	–	3	–	1
Syracuse		–		6	–	3	–	0
Colgate		–		4	–	2	–	2
Vermont		–		5	–	4	–	0
Fordham		–		5	–	3	–	0
Western U. of Penn.		–		6	–	4	–	0
Holy Cross		–		4	–	3	–	1
Amherst		–		3	–	3	–	1
Lehigh		–		5	–	5	–	1
Bucknell		–		3	–	4	–	1
Dickinson		–		3	–	4	–	2
Carnegie Tech		–		2	–	3	–	2
Army		–		3	–	5	–	1
Franklin & Marshall		–		3	–	5	–	1
Wesleyan		–		2	–	4	–	1
New Hampshire		–		2	–	5	–	1
Villanova		–		3	–	7	–	0
Springfield Training School		–		1	–	5	–	3
NYU		–		0	–	4	–	0

The 1906 Syracuse Orangemen football team represented Syracuse University as an independent during the 1906 college football season. The head coach was Frank "Buck" O'Neill, coaching his first season with the Orangemen.

== Schedule ==
Date	Time	Opponent	Site	Result	Attendance	Source
September 22		Hobart	Syracuse, NY	W 28–6	800	
September 27		Rochester	Syracuse, NY	W 38–0		
October 6		at Yale	Yale Field; New Haven, CT	L 0–51		
October 13		at Hamilton	New Haven, CT	W 37–0	2,000	
October 20		Colgate	Syracuse, NY (rivalry)	L 0–5	8,000	
November 3	2:30 p.m.	vs. Carlisle	Olympic Park; Buffalo, NY	L 4–9	8,000	
November 10		Niagara	Syracuse, NY	W 46–0		
November 17		at Lafayette	Easton, PA	W 12–4		
November 24		at Army	The Plain; West Point, NY	W 4–0		
