= 1906 Swarthmore Quakers football team =

American college football season

1906 Swarthmore Quakers football
- Conference: Independent
- Record: 7–2
- Head coach: George H. Brooke (8th season)
- Home stadium: Whittier Field

1906 Eastern college football independents records
	Conf.			Overall
Team	W	L	T	W		L		T
Princeton		–		9	–	0	–	1
Yale		–		9	–	0	–	1
Haverford		–		7	–	0	–	2
Harvard		–		10	–	1	–	0
Cornell		–		8	–	1	–	2
Lafayette		–		8	–	1	–	1
Penn State		–		8	–	1	–	1
Washington & Jefferson		–		9	–	2	–	0
Swarthmore		–		7	–	2	–	0
Drexel		–		6	–	2	–	0
Tufts		–		6	–	2	–	0
Penn		–		7	–	2	–	3
Carlisle		–		9	–	3	–	0
Brown		–		6	–	3	–	0
Rutgers		–		5	–	2	–	2
Dartmouth		–		6	–	3	–	1
Syracuse		–		6	–	3	–	0
Colgate		–		4	–	2	–	2
Vermont		–		5	–	4	–	0
Fordham		–		5	–	3	–	0
Western U. of Penn.		–		6	–	4	–	0
Holy Cross		–		4	–	3	–	1
Amherst		–		3	–	3	–	1
Lehigh		–		5	–	5	–	1
Bucknell		–		3	–	4	–	1
Dickinson		–		3	–	4	–	2
Carnegie Tech		–		2	–	3	–	2
Army		–		3	–	5	–	1
Franklin & Marshall		–		3	–	5	–	1
Wesleyan		–		2	–	4	–	1
New Hampshire		–		2	–	5	–	1
Villanova		–		3	–	7	–	0
Springfield Training School		–		1	–	5	–	3
NYU		–		0	–	4	–	0

The 1906 Swarthmore Quakers football team was an American football team that represented Swarthmore College as an independent during the 1906 college football season. The team compiled a 7–2 record. George H. Brooke was the head coach.

== Schedule ==
Date	Opponent	Site	Result	Source
September 29	USS Washington	Swarthmore, PA	W 65–0	
October 6	Villanova	Swarthmore, PA	W 4–0	
October 13	at Penn	Franklin Field; Philadelphia, PA	W 4–0	
October 20	George Washington	Swarthmore, PA	W 17–0	
October 27	Gettysburg	Swarthmore, PA	W 19–4	
November 3	at Johns Hopkins	Baltimore, MD	W 26–0	
November 10	at Navy	Worden Field; Annapolis, MD	L 4–5	
November 17	at Cornell	Percy Field; Ithaca, NY	L 0–28	
November 24	Amherst	Whittier Field; Swarthmore, PA	W 21–0	
