= 1906 Cornell Big Red football team =

American college football season

1906 Cornell Big Red football
- Conference: Independent
- Record: 8–1–2
- Head coach: Pop Warner (5th season)
- Captain: George Cook
- Home stadium: Percy Field

1906 Eastern college football independents records
| | Conf. | | | Overall |
| Team | W | L | T | W | | L | | T |
|---|---|---|---|---|---|---|---|---|
| Princeton | | – | | 9 | – | 0 | – | 1 |
| Yale | | – | | 9 | – | 0 | – | 1 |
| Haverford | | – | | 7 | – | 0 | – | 2 |
| Harvard | | – | | 10 | – | 1 | – | 0 |
| Cornell | | – | | 8 | – | 1 | – | 2 |
| Lafayette | | – | | 8 | – | 1 | – | 1 |
| Penn State | | – | | 8 | – | 1 | – | 1 |
| Washington & Jefferson | | – | | 9 | – | 2 | – | 0 |
| Swarthmore | | – | | 7 | – | 2 | – | 0 |
| Drexel | | – | | 6 | – | 2 | – | 0 |
| Tufts | | – | | 6 | – | 2 | – | 0 |
| Penn | | – | | 7 | – | 2 | – | 3 |
| Carlisle | | – | | 9 | – | 3 | – | 0 |
| Brown | | – | | 6 | – | 3 | – | 0 |
| Rutgers | | – | | 5 | – | 2 | – | 2 |
| Dartmouth | | – | | 6 | – | 3 | – | 1 |
| Syracuse | | – | | 6 | – | 3 | – | 0 |
| Colgate | | – | | 4 | – | 2 | – | 2 |
| Vermont | | – | | 5 | – | 4 | – | 0 |
| Fordham | | – | | 5 | – | 3 | – | 0 |
| Western U. of Penn. | | – | | 6 | – | 4 | – | 0 |
| Holy Cross | | – | | 4 | – | 3 | – | 1 |
| Amherst | | – | | 3 | – | 3 | – | 1 |
| Lehigh | | – | | 5 | – | 5 | – | 1 |
| Bucknell | | – | | 3 | – | 4 | – | 1 |
| Dickinson | | – | | 3 | – | 4 | – | 2 |
| Carnegie Tech | | – | | 2 | – | 3 | – | 2 |
| Army | | – | | 3 | – | 5 | – | 1 |
| Franklin & Marshall | | – | | 3 | – | 5 | – | 1 |
| Wesleyan | | – | | 2 | – | 4 | – | 1 |
| New Hampshire | | – | | 2 | – | 5 | – | 1 |
| Villanova | | – | | 3 | – | 7 | – | 0 |
| Springfield Training School | | – | | 1 | – | 5 | – | 3 |
| NYU | | – | | 0 | – | 4 | – | 0 |

The 1906 Cornell Big Red football team was an American football team that represented Cornell University during the 1906 college football season. In their fifth, non-consecutive season under head coach Pop Warner, the Big Red compiled an 8–1–2 record, shut out 6 of 11 opponents, and outscored all opponents by a combined total of 237 to 37. Three Cornell players received honors on the 1906 College Football All-America Team: guard Elmer Thompson (Walter Camp-1, Caspar Whitney-2); center William Newman (Whitney-1); and fullback George Walders (Whitney-2).

== Schedule ==
| Date | Opponent | Site | Result | Attendance | Source |
|---|---|---|---|---|---|
| September 29 | Colgate | Percy Field; Ithaca, NY (rivalry) | T 0–0 | | |
| October 3 | Hamilton | Percy Field; Ithaca, NY | W 21–0 | | |
| October 6 | Oberlin | Percy Field; Ithaca, NY | W 25–5 | | |
| October 10 | Niagara | Percy Field; Ithaca, NY | W 23–6 | | |
| October 13 | Bucknell | Percy Field; Ithaca, NY | W 24–6 | | |
| October 20 | Bowdoin | Percy Field; Ithaca, NY | W 72–0 | | |
| October 27 | vs. Princeton | Polo Grounds; New York, NY | L 5–14 | 20,000 | |
| November 3 | Western University of Pennsylvania | Percy Field; Ithaca, NY | W 23–0 | | |
| November 10 | Holy Cross | Percy Field; Ithaca, NY | W 16–6 | | |
| November 17 | Swarthmore | Percy Field; Ithaca, NY | W 28–0 | | |
| November 29 | at Penn | Franklin Field; Philadelphia, PA (rivalry) | T 0–0 | | |
