= 1906 Carlisle Indians football team =

American college football season

1906 Carlisle Indians football
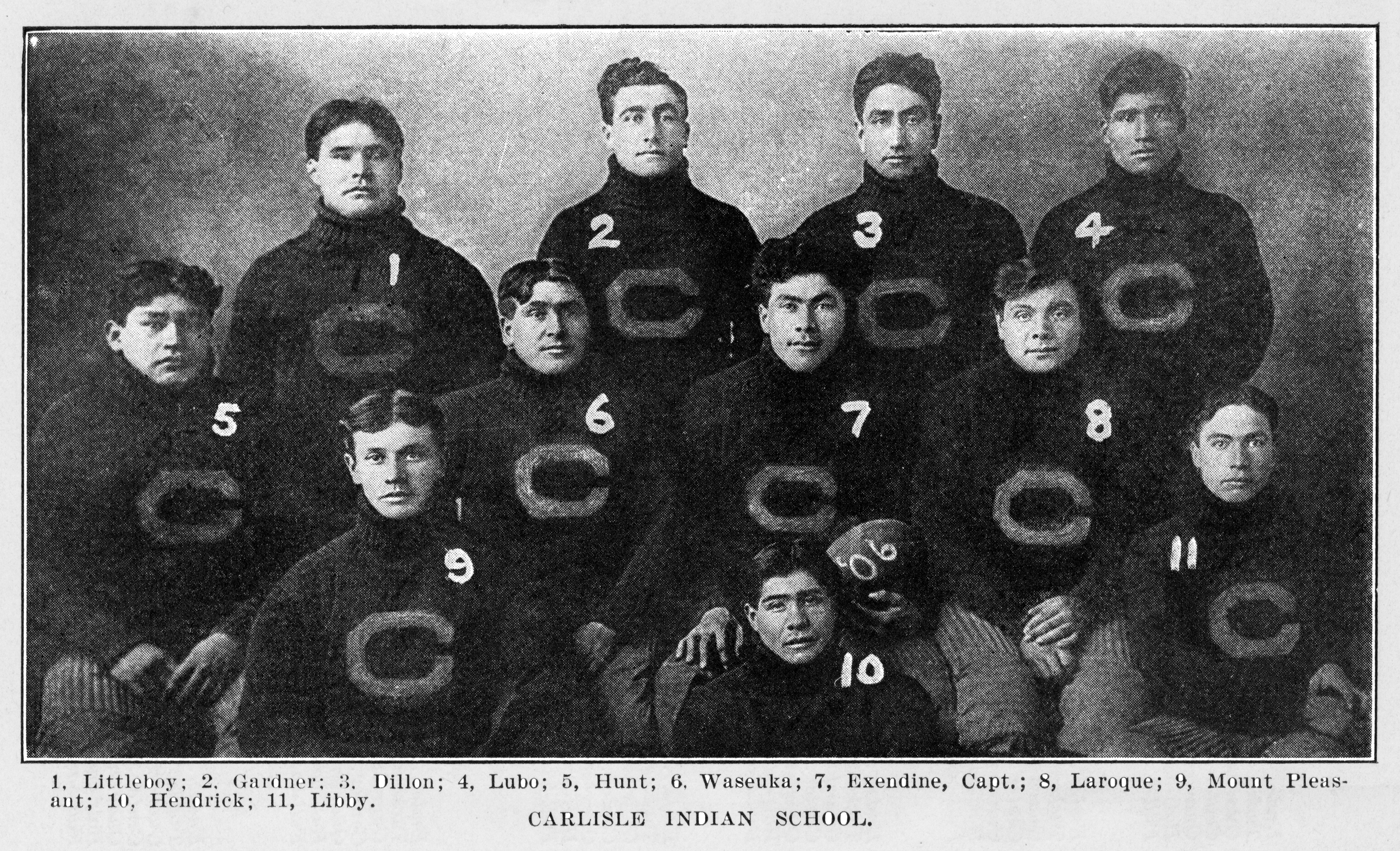
- Conference: Independent
- Record: 9–3
- Head coach: Bemus Pierce (1st season)
- Captain: Albert Exendine
- Home stadium: Indian Field

1906 Eastern college football independents records
	Conf.			Overall
Team	W	L	T	W		L		T
Princeton		–		9	–	0	–	1
Yale		–		9	–	0	–	1
Haverford		–		7	–	0	–	2
Harvard		–		10	–	1	–	0
Cornell		–		8	–	1	–	2
Lafayette		–		8	–	1	–	1
Penn State		–		8	–	1	–	1
Washington & Jefferson		–		9	–	2	–	0
Swarthmore		–		7	–	2	–	0
Drexel		–		6	–	2	–	0
Tufts		–		6	–	2	–	0
Penn		–		7	–	2	–	3
Carlisle		–		9	–	3	–	0
Brown		–		6	–	3	–	0
Rutgers		–		5	–	2	–	2
Dartmouth		–		6	–	3	–	1
Syracuse		–		6	–	3	–	0
Colgate		–		4	–	2	–	2
Vermont		–		5	–	4	–	0
Fordham		–		5	–	3	–	0
Western U. of Penn.		–		6	–	4	–	0
Holy Cross		–		4	–	3	–	1
Amherst		–		3	–	3	–	1
Lehigh		–		5	–	5	–	1
Bucknell		–		3	–	4	–	1
Dickinson		–		3	–	4	–	2
Carnegie Tech		–		2	–	3	–	2
Army		–		3	–	5	–	1
Franklin & Marshall		–		3	–	5	–	1
Wesleyan		–		2	–	4	–	1
New Hampshire		–		2	–	5	–	1
Villanova		–		3	–	7	–	0
Springfield Training School		–		1	–	5	–	3
NYU		–		0	–	4	–	0

The 1906 Carlisle Indians football team represented the Carlisle Indian Industrial School of Carlisle, Pennsylvania, as an independent during the 1906 college football season.

Led by Bemus Pierce in his first and only season as head coach, the Indians compiled a record of 9–3 and outscored opponents 244 to 40. Vanderbilt had one of the first big upsets from the south when it defeated Carlisle 4 to 0. 1906 was the first season with a legal forward pass.

== Schedule ==
Date	Time	Opponent	Site	Result	Attendance	Source
September 22		Villanova	Indian Field; Carlisle, PA	W 6–0		
September 29		Albright	Indian Field; Carlisle, PA	W 82–0		
October 3		Susquehanna	Indian Field; Carlisle, PA	W 48–0		
October 6		vs. Penn State	Williamsport, PA	L 0–4		
October 20		at Western University of Pennsylvania	Exposition Park; Pittsburgh, PA	W 22–0	5,000	
October 27		at Penn	Franklin Field; Philadelphia, PA	W 24–6	20,000	
November 3	2:30 p.m.	vs. Syracuse	Olympic Park; Buffalo, NY	W 9–4	8,000	
November 10		at Harvard	Harvard Stadium; Boston, MA	L 0–5		
November 17		at Minnesota	Northrop Field; Minneapolis, MN	W 17–0	20,000	
November 22		at Vanderbilt	Dudley Field; Nashville, TN	L 0–4	8,000	
November 24	3:00 p.m.	at Cincinnati	League Park; Cincinnati, OH	W 18–0	5,000	
November 29		vs. Virginia	Lafayette Field; Norfolk, VA	W 18–17	7,000	

== See also ==
- 1906 College Football All-America Team
