= 1906 Yale Bulldogs football team =

American college football season

1906 Yale Bulldogs football

National champion (Whitney, Davis, Billingsley)
- Conference: Independent
- Record: 9–0–1
- Head coach: Foster Rockwell (1st season)
- Captain: Samuel Finley Brown Morse
- Home stadium: Yale Field

1906 Eastern college football independents records
	Conf.			Overall
Team	W	L	T	W		L		T
Princeton		–		9	–	0	–	1
Yale		–		9	–	0	–	1
Haverford		–		7	–	0	–	2
Harvard		–		10	–	1	–	0
Cornell		–		8	–	1	–	2
Lafayette		–		8	–	1	–	1
Penn State		–		8	–	1	–	1
Washington & Jefferson		–		9	–	2	–	0
Swarthmore		–		7	–	2	–	0
Drexel		–		6	–	2	–	0
Tufts		–		6	–	2	–	0
Penn		–		7	–	2	–	3
Carlisle		–		9	–	3	–	0
Brown		–		6	–	3	–	0
Rutgers		–		5	–	2	–	2
Dartmouth		–		6	–	3	–	1
Syracuse		–		6	–	3	–	0
Colgate		–		4	–	2	–	2
Vermont		–		5	–	4	–	0
Fordham		–		5	–	3	–	0
Western U. of Penn.		–		6	–	4	–	0
Holy Cross		–		4	–	3	–	1
Amherst		–		3	–	3	–	1
Lehigh		–		5	–	5	–	1
Bucknell		–		3	–	4	–	1
Dickinson		–		3	–	4	–	2
Carnegie Tech		–		2	–	3	–	2
Army		–		3	–	5	–	1
Franklin & Marshall		–		3	–	5	–	1
Wesleyan		–		2	–	4	–	1
New Hampshire		–		2	–	5	–	1
Villanova		–		3	–	7	–	0
Springfield Training School		–		1	–	5	–	3
NYU		–		0	–	4	–	0

The 1906 Yale Bulldogs football team was an American football team that represented Yale University as an independent during the 1906 college football season. The team compiled a 9–0–1 record, shut out nine of ten opponents, and outscored all opponents by a total of 144 to 7. Four Yale players were selected as consensus All-Americans, and the team was selected by multiple selectors as the national champion for 1906.

== Schedule ==
Date	Time	Opponent	Site	Result	Attendance	Source
October 3		Wesleyan	Yale Field; New Haven, CT	W 21–0		
October 6		Syracuse	Yale Field; New Haven, CT	W 51–0		
October 10		Springfield Training School	Yale Field; New Haven, CT	W 12–0	1,000	
October 13		Holy Cross	Yale Field; New Haven, CT	W 17–0	1,000	
October 20		Penn State	Yale Field; New Haven, CT	W 10–0		
October 27		Amherst	Yale Field; New Haven, CT	W 12–0		
November 3		at Army	The Plain; West Point, NY	W 10–6		
November 10		Brown	Yale Field; New Haven, CT	W 5–0		
November 17	2:08 p.m.	at Princeton	University Field; Princeton, NJ (rivalry)	T 0–0	30,000	
November 24		Harvard	Yale Field; New Haven, CT (rivalry)	W 6–0		
All times are in Eastern time; Source:

== National champions ==
In the January 1907 edition of The Outing Magazine, Caspar Whitney ranked Yale first among the nation's teams for 1906.

Parke H. Davis selected the team as national champions in the 1934 edition of Spalding's Official Foot Ball Guide. Later, they were also selected by the Billingsley Report.

Other selectors (Helms, NCF) chose Princeton as the national champion. Yale and Princeton both finished with undefeated seasons and played each other to a 0–0 tie on November 17, 1906.

== Key players ==
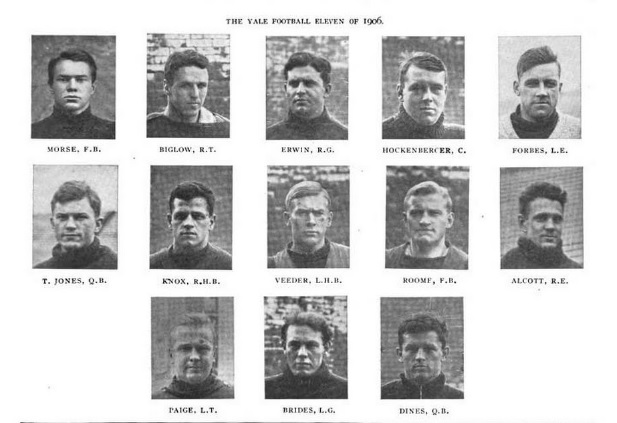
The Yale eleven on the Yale Alumni Weekly

Four Yale players were among the eleven selected as consensus first-team players on the 1906 All-America team. Yale's four consensus All Americans were: halfback William F. Knox; fullback Paul Veeder; end Robert Forbes; and tackle Lucius Horatio Biglow. Five other Yale players receiving All-American honors were quarterback Tad Jones, fullback Samuel F. B. Morse, center Clarence Hockenberger, end Clarence Alcott, and Arthur Brides.

The 1906 college football season was a year of change. Following controversies in 1905 over the increase of violence and professionalism in college football, a number of rule changes were implemented in 1906. The most lasting change introduced in 1906 was the forward pass. Yale's Paul Veeder and Bob Forbes combined for one of the first important pass plays, a play described in one history of the game as follows: "The only other significant pass that season was thrown by Yale, which gained a first down that led to victory over Harvard, when Paul Veeder threw thirty yards to Bob Forbes."
