= 1906 Army Cadets football team =

American college football season

1906 Army Cadets football
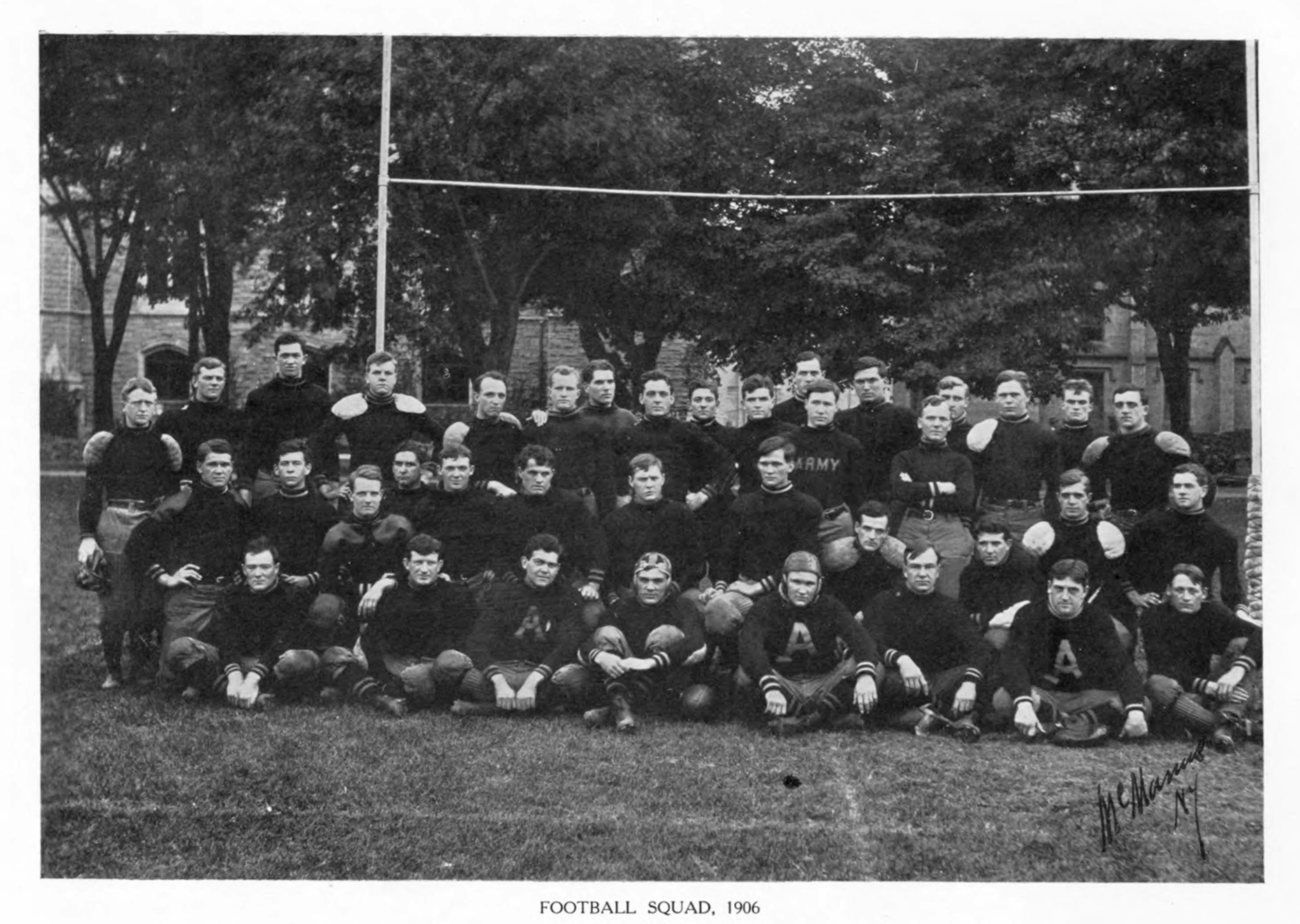
- Conference: Independent
- Record: 3–5–1
- Head coach: Henry Smither (1st season; first game); Ernest Graves Sr. (1st season, final 8 games)
- Captain: Ray Hill
- Home stadium: The Plain

1906 Eastern college football independents records
	Conf.			Overall
Team	W	L	T	W		L		T
Princeton		–		9	–	0	–	1
Yale		–		9	–	0	–	1
Haverford		–		7	–	0	–	2
Harvard		–		10	–	1	–	0
Cornell		–		8	–	1	–	2
Lafayette		–		8	–	1	–	1
Penn State		–		8	–	1	–	1
Washington & Jefferson		–		9	–	2	–	0
Swarthmore		–		7	–	2	–	0
Drexel		–		6	–	2	–	0
Tufts		–		6	–	2	–	0
Penn		–		7	–	2	–	3
Carlisle		–		9	–	3	–	0
Brown		–		6	–	3	–	0
Rutgers		–		5	–	2	–	2
Dartmouth		–		6	–	3	–	1
Syracuse		–		6	–	3	–	0
Colgate		–		4	–	2	–	2
Vermont		–		5	–	4	–	0
Fordham		–		5	–	3	–	0
Western U. of Penn.		–		6	–	4	–	0
Holy Cross		–		4	–	3	–	1
Amherst		–		3	–	3	–	1
Lehigh		–		5	–	5	–	1
Bucknell		–		3	–	4	–	1
Dickinson		–		3	–	4	–	2
Carnegie Tech		–		2	–	3	–	2
Army		–		3	–	5	–	1
Franklin & Marshall		–		3	–	5	–	1
Wesleyan		–		2	–	4	–	1
New Hampshire		–		2	–	5	–	1
Villanova		–		3	–	7	–	0
Springfield Training School		–		1	–	5	–	3
NYU		–		0	–	4	–	0

The 1906 Army Cadets football team represented the United States Military Academy as an independent during the 1906 college football season. The Cadets compiled a 3–5–1 record, shut out four opponents (including a scoreless tie with Colgate), and outscored all opponents by a combined total of 59 to 37. Henry Smither was the coach in the first game of the season, and Ernest Graves, Sr. was the coach in games two through nine. The team's setbacks included losses to Harvard, Yale, and Princeton. In the annual Army–Navy Game, the Cadets lost to the Midshipmen 10–0.

Two Army players were honored by either Walter Camp (WC) or Caspar Whitney (CW) on the All-America team. They are tackle Henry Weeks (WC-3, CW-2) and guard William Christy (WC-3).

== Schedule ==
Date	Opponent	Site	Result	Source
September 29	Tufts	The Plain; West Point, NY	W 12–0	
October 6	Trinity (CT)	The Plain; West Point, NY	W 24–0	
October 13	Colgate	The Plain; West Point, NY	T 0–0	
October 20	Williams	The Plain; West Point, NY	W 17–0	
October 27	Harvard	The Plain; West Point, NY	L 0–5	
November 3	Yale	The Plain; West Point, NY	L 6–10	
November 10	Princeton	The Plain; West Point, NY	L 0–8	
November 24	Syracuse	The Plain; West Point, NY	L 0–4	
December 1	vs. Navy	Franklin Field; Philadelphia, PA (Army–Navy Game)	L 0–10	
