= 1906 Harvard Crimson football team =

American college football season

1906 Harvard Crimson football
- Conference: Independent
- Record: 10–1
- Head coach: Bill Reid (2nd season)
- Home stadium: Harvard Stadium

1906 Eastern college football independents records
	Conf.			Overall
Team	W	L	T	W		L		T
Princeton		–		9	–	0	–	1
Yale		–		9	–	0	–	1
Haverford		–		7	–	0	–	2
Harvard		–		10	–	1	–	0
Cornell		–		8	–	1	–	2
Lafayette		–		8	–	1	–	1
Penn State		–		8	–	1	–	1
Washington & Jefferson		–		9	–	2	–	0
Swarthmore		–		7	–	2	–	0
Drexel		–		6	–	2	–	0
Tufts		–		6	–	2	–	0
Penn		–		7	–	2	–	3
Carlisle		–		9	–	3	–	0
Brown		–		6	–	3	–	0
Rutgers		–		5	–	2	–	2
Dartmouth		–		6	–	3	–	1
Syracuse		–		6	–	3	–	0
Colgate		–		4	–	2	–	2
Vermont		–		5	–	4	–	0
Fordham		–		5	–	3	–	0
Western U. of Penn.		–		6	–	4	–	0
Holy Cross		–		4	–	3	–	1
Amherst		–		3	–	3	–	1
Lehigh		–		5	–	5	–	1
Bucknell		–		3	–	4	–	1
Dickinson		–		3	–	4	–	2
Carnegie Tech		–		2	–	3	–	2
Army		–		3	–	5	–	1
Frankin & Marshall		–		3	–	5	–	1
Wesleyan		–		2	–	4	–	1
New Hampshire		–		2	–	5	–	1
Villanova		–		3	–	7	–	0
Springfield Training School		–		1	–	5	–	3
NYU		–		0	–	4	–	0

The 1906 Harvard Crimson football team represented Harvard University in the 1906 college football season. The Crimson finished with a 10–1 record under second-year head coach Bill Reid. The team won its first ten games by a combined 167–20 score, but lost its final game against rival Yale by a 6–0 score. Walter Camp selected only one Harvard player, guard Francis Burr, as a first-team player on his 1906 College Football All-America Team. Caspar Whitney selected two Harvard players as first-team members of his All-America team: Burr and tackle Charles Osborne.

== Schedule ==
Date	Time	Opponent	Site	Result	Attendance	Source
September 22		Williams	Harvard Stadium; Boston, MA	W 7–0		
September 26		Bowdoin	Harvard Stadium; Boston, MA	W 10–0		
September 29		Maine	Harvard Stadium; Boston, MA	W 17–0		
October 6		Bates	Harvard Stadium; Boston, MA	W 27–6		
October 13		Massachusetts	Harvard Stadium; Boston, MA	W 21–0		
October 20	3:00 p.m.	Springfield Training School	Harvard Stadium; Boston, MA	W 44–0	5,000	
October 27		at Army	The Plain; West Point, NY	W 5–0		
November 3		Brown	Harvard Stadium; Boston, MA	W 9–5		
November 10		Carlisle	Harvard Stadium; Boston, MA	W 5–0		
November 17		Dartmouth	Harvard Stadium; Boston, MA (rivalry)	W 22–9		
November 24		at Yale	Yale Field; New Haven, CT (rivalry)	L 0–6		
