= 1906 Princeton Tigers football team =

American college football season

1906 Princeton Tigers football

National champion (Helms, NCF)
- Conference: Independent
- Record: 9–0–1
- Head coach: Bill Roper (1st season)
- Offensive scheme: Short punt
- Captain: Herb Dillon

1906 Eastern college football independents records
	Conf.			Overall
Team	W	L	T	W		L		T
Princeton		–		9	–	0	–	1
Yale		–		9	–	0	–	1
Haverford		–		7	–	0	–	2
Harvard		–		10	–	1	–	0
Cornell		–		8	–	1	–	2
Lafayette		–		8	–	1	–	1
Penn State		–		8	–	1	–	1
Washington & Jefferson		–		9	–	2	–	0
Swarthmore		–		7	–	2	–	0
Drexel		–		6	–	2	–	0
Tufts		–		6	–	2	–	0
Penn		–		7	–	2	–	3
Carlisle		–		9	–	3	–	0
Brown		–		6	–	3	–	0
Rutgers		–		5	–	2	–	2
Dartmouth		–		6	–	3	–	1
Syracuse		–		6	–	3	–	0
Colgate		–		4	–	2	–	2
Vermont		–		5	–	4	–	0
Fordham		–		5	–	3	–	0
Western U. of Penn.		–		6	–	4	–	0
Holy Cross		–		4	–	3	–	1
Amherst		–		3	–	3	–	1
Lehigh		–		5	–	5	–	1
Bucknell		–		3	–	4	–	1
Dickinson		–		3	–	4	–	2
Carnegie Tech		–		2	–	3	–	2
Army		–		3	–	5	–	1
Franklin & Marshall		–		3	–	5	–	1
Wesleyan		–		2	–	4	–	1
New Hampshire		–		2	–	5	–	1
Villanova		–		3	–	7	–	0
Springfield Training School		–		1	–	5	–	3
NYU		–		0	–	4	–	0

The 1906 Princeton Tigers football team represented Princeton University in the 1906 college football season. In their first season under head coach Bill Roper, the team compiled a 9–0–1 record, shut out eight of ten opponents, and outscored all opponents by a total of 205 to 9. Herb Dillon was the team captain.

There was no contemporaneous system in 1906 for determining a national champion. However, Princeton was retroactively named as the national champion by the Helms Athletic Foundation and National Championship Foundation.

Three Princeton players were selected as consensus first-team players on the 1906 All-America team: quarterback Edward Dillon; end Caspar Wister; and tackle James Cooney. Other key players included fullback Jim McCormick, who was later inducted into the College Football Hall of Fame.

== Schedule ==
Date	Time	Opponent	Site	Result	Attendance	Source
September 29		Villanova	University Field; Princeton, NJ	W 24–0		
October 3		Stevens	University Field; Princeton, NJ	W 22–0		
October 6		Washington & Jefferson	University Field; Princeton, NJ	W 6–0		
October 10		Lehigh	University Field; Princeton, NJ	W 52–0		
October 13		at Navy	Worden Field; Annapolis, MD	W 5–0		
October 20		Bucknell	University Field; Princeton, NJ	W 32–4	2,000	
October 27		vs. Cornell	Polo Grounds; New York, NY	W 14–5	20,000	
November 3		Dartmouth	University Field; Princeton, NJ	W 42–0	8,000	
November 10		at Army	The Plain; West Point, NY	W 8–0		
November 17	2:08 p.m.	Yale	University Field; Princeton, NJ (rivalry)	T 0–0	30,000	
