= 1906 Penn Quakers football team =

American college football season

1906 Penn Quakers football
- Conference: Independent
- Record: 7–2–3
- Head coach: Carl S. Williams (5th season)
- Captain: Edward L. Greene
- Home stadium: Franklin Field

1906 Eastern college football independents records
	Conf.			Overall
Team	W	L	T	W		L		T
Princeton		–		9	–	0	–	1
Yale		–		9	–	0	–	1
Haverford		–		7	–	0	–	2
Harvard		–		10	–	1	–	0
Cornell		–		8	–	1	–	2
Lafayette		–		8	–	1	–	1
Penn State		–		8	–	1	–	1
Washington & Jefferson		–		9	–	2	–	0
Swarthmore		–		7	–	2	–	0
Drexel		–		6	–	2	–	0
Tufts		–		6	–	2	–	0
Penn		–		7	–	2	–	3
Carlisle		–		9	–	3	–	0
Brown		–		6	–	3	–	0
Rutgers		–		5	–	2	–	2
Dartmouth		–		6	–	3	–	1
Syracuse		–		6	–	3	–	0
Colgate		–		4	–	2	–	2
Vermont		–		5	–	4	–	0
Fordham		–		5	–	3	–	0
Western U. of Penn.		–		6	–	4	–	0
Holy Cross		–		4	–	3	–	1
Amherst		–		3	–	3	–	1
Lehigh		–		5	–	5	–	1
Bucknell		–		3	–	4	–	1
Dickinson		–		3	–	4	–	2
Carnegie Tech		–		2	–	3	–	2
Army		–		3	–	5	–	1
Franklin & Marshall		–		3	–	5	–	1
Wesleyan		–		2	–	4	–	1
New Hampshire		–		2	–	5	–	1
Villanova		–		3	–	7	–	0
Springfield Training School		–		1	–	5	–	3
NYU		–		0	–	4	–	0

The 1906 Penn Quakers football team represented the University of Pennsylvania as an independent during the 1906 college football season. The Quakers finished with a 7–2–3 record in their fifth year under head coach Carl S. Williams. Significant games included a 24 to 6 loss to the Carlisle Indians, a 17 to 0 victory over Michigan, and a scoreless tie with Cornell The 1906 Penn team outscored its opponents by a combined total of 186 to 58.

Eight players on the 1906 Penn team received recognition on the 1906 College Football All-America Team. They are ends Izzy Levene (WC-3; CW-2; NYS-2; CC-2; NYT-2) and Hunter Scarlett (NYM-1), tackle Dexter Draper (WC-2; NYS-1; NYT-2), guard Gus Ziegler (WC-2; CW-1; NYS-2; CC-2; NYM-1; NYT-2), center William Thomas Dunn (WC-1), and halfbacks Bill Hollenback (WC-2; CW-1; NYS-1; NYM-1), Bob Folwell (NYT-1) and Edward Green (NYT-2).

== Schedule ==
Date	Opponent	Site	Result	Attendance	Source
September 29	Lehigh	Franklin Field; Philadelphia, PA	W 32–6		
October 3	Gettysburg	Franklin Field; Philadelphia, PA	T 6–6		
October 6	North Carolina	Franklin Field; Philadelphia, PA	W 11–0		
October 10	Franklin & Marshall	Franklin Field; Philadelphia, PA	W 47–6		
October 13	Swarthmore	Franklin Field; Philadelphia, PA	L 0–4		
October 17	Medico-Chirurgical	Franklin Field; Philadelphia, PA	W 31–0		
October 20	Brown	Franklin Field; Philadelphia, PA	W 14–0		
October 27	Carlisle	Franklin Field; Philadelphia, PA	L 6–24	20,000	
November 10	Lafayette	Franklin Field; Philadelphia, PA	T 0–0		
November 17	Michigan	Franklin Field; Philadelphia, PA	W 17–0	26,000	
November 24	Villanova	Franklin Field; Philadelphia, PA	W 22–12		
November 29	Cornell	Franklin Field; Philadelphia, PA (rivalry)	T 0–0		
