= 1906 Brown Bears football team =

American college football season

1906 Brown Bears football
- Conference: Independent
- Record: 6–3
- Head coach: Edward N. Robinson (7th season)
- Captain: V. A. Schwartz
- Home stadium: Andrews Field

1906 Eastern college football independents records
| | Conf. | | | Overall |
| Team | W | L | T | W | | L | | T |
|---|---|---|---|---|---|---|---|---|
| Princeton | | – | | 9 | – | 0 | – | 1 |
| Yale | | – | | 9 | – | 0 | – | 1 |
| Haverford | | – | | 7 | – | 0 | – | 2 |
| Harvard | | – | | 10 | – | 1 | – | 0 |
| Cornell | | – | | 8 | – | 1 | – | 2 |
| Lafayette | | – | | 8 | – | 1 | – | 1 |
| Penn State | | – | | 8 | – | 1 | – | 1 |
| Washington & Jefferson | | – | | 9 | – | 2 | – | 0 |
| Swarthmore | | – | | 7 | – | 2 | – | 0 |
| Drexel | | – | | 6 | – | 2 | – | 0 |
| Tufts | | – | | 6 | – | 2 | – | 0 |
| Penn | | – | | 7 | – | 2 | – | 3 |
| Carlisle | | – | | 9 | – | 3 | – | 0 |
| Brown | | – | | 6 | – | 3 | – | 0 |
| Rutgers | | – | | 5 | – | 2 | – | 2 |
| Dartmouth | | – | | 6 | – | 3 | – | 1 |
| Syracuse | | – | | 6 | – | 3 | – | 0 |
| Colgate | | – | | 4 | – | 2 | – | 2 |
| Vermont | | – | | 5 | – | 4 | – | 0 |
| Fordham | | – | | 5 | – | 3 | – | 0 |
| Western U. of Penn. | | – | | 6 | – | 4 | – | 0 |
| Holy Cross | | – | | 4 | – | 3 | – | 1 |
| Amherst | | – | | 3 | – | 3 | – | 1 |
| Lehigh | | – | | 5 | – | 5 | – | 1 |
| Bucknell | | – | | 3 | – | 4 | – | 1 |
| Dickinson | | – | | 3 | – | 4 | – | 2 |
| Carnegie Tech | | – | | 2 | – | 3 | – | 2 |
| Army | | – | | 3 | – | 5 | – | 1 |
| Franklin & Marshall | | – | | 3 | – | 5 | – | 1 |
| Wesleyan | | – | | 2 | – | 4 | – | 1 |
| New Hampshire | | – | | 2 | – | 5 | – | 1 |
| Villanova | | – | | 3 | – | 7 | – | 0 |
| Springfield Training School | | – | | 1 | – | 5 | – | 3 |
| NYU | | – | | 0 | – | 4 | – | 0 |

The 1906 Brown Bears football team represented Brown University as an independent during the 1906 college football season. Led by seventh-year head coach Edward N. Robinson, Brown compiled a record of 6–3.

== Schedule ==
| Date | Opponent | Site | Result | Source |
|---|---|---|---|---|
| September 29 | New Hampshire | Andrews Field; Providence, RI | W 12–0 | |
| October 6 | Wesleyan | Andrews Field; Providence, RI | W 17–0 | |
| October 10 | Massachusetts | Andrews Field; Providence, RI | W 17–0 | |
| October 20 | at Penn | Franklin Field; Philadelphia, PA | L 0–14 | |
| October 27 | Norwich | Andrews Field; Providence, RI | W 26–4 | |
| November 3 | at Harvard | Harvard Stadium; Boston, MA | L 5–9 | |
| November 10 | at Yale | Yale Field; New Haven, CT | L 0–5 | |
| November 17 | Vermont | Andrews Field; Providence, RI | W 12–0 | |
| November 24 | vs. Dartmouth | Hampden Park; Springfield, MA | W 23–0 | |
