= 1909 college football rankings =

- Season: 1909
- Bowl season: 1909–10 bowl games
- End of season champions: Yale

The 1909 college football season rankings included a ranking by New York City newspaper The Sun.

== The Sun ==
In November 1909, New York City newspaper The Sun ranked the top-twelve Eastern teams.

Rank	Team	Record
1	Yale	10–0
2	Harvard	9–1

== See also ==
- 1909 College Football All-America Team
