= 1909 Rutgers Queensmen football team =

American college football season

1909 Rutgers Queensmen football
- Conference: Independent
- Record: 3–5–1
- Head coach: Herman Pritchard (1st season)
- Captain: Edwin T. Leslie
- Home stadium: Neilson Field

1909 Eastern college football independents records
	Conf.			Overall
Team	W	L	T	W		L		T
Yale		–		10	–	0	–	0
Lafayette		–		7	–	0	–	1
Franklin & Marshall		–		9	–	1	–	0
Harvard		–		9	–	1	–	0
Penn State		–		5	–	0	–	2
Washington & Jefferson		–		8	–	1	–	1
Springfield Training School		–		5	–	1	–	0
NYU		–		6	–	1	–	1
Ursinus		–		6	–	1	–	1
Penn		–		7	–	1	–	2
Trinity (CT)		–		6	–	1	–	2
Dartmouth		–		5	–	1	–	2
Fordham		–		5	–	1	–	2
Princeton		–		6	–	2	–	1
Pittsburgh		–		6	–	2	–	1
Carlisle		–		8	–	3	–	1
Colgate		–		5	–	2	–	1
Brown		–		7	–	3	–	1
Geneva		–		4	–	2	–	0
Carnegie Tech		–		5	–	3	–	1
Vermont		–		4	–	2	–	2
Lehigh		–		4	–	3	–	2
Army		–		3	–	2	–	0
Villanova		–		3	–	2	–	0
Dickinson		–		4	–	4	–	1
Syracuse		–		4	–	5	–	1
Bucknell		–		3	–	4	–	2
Boston College		–		3	–	4	–	1
Cornell		–		3	–	4	–	1
New Hampshire		–		3	–	4	–	0
Rhode Island State		–		3	–	4	–	0
Rutgers		–		3	–	5	–	1
Wesleyan		–		3	–	5	–	1
Holy Cross		–		2	–	4	–	2
Swarthmore		–		2	–	5	–	0
Drexel		–		1	–	5	–	3
Tufts		–		2	–	6	–	0
Amherst		–		1	–	6	–	1
Temple		–		0	–	4	–	1

The 1909 Rutgers Queensmen football team represented Rutgers University as an independent during the 1909 college football season. In their first and only season under head coach Herman Pritchard, the Queensmen compiled a 3–5–1 record and were outscored by their opponents, 74 to 62. The team captain was Edwin T. Leslie.

== Schedule ==
Date	Opponent	Site	Result	Source
October 2	Fordham	Neilson Field; New Brunswick, NJ	L 0–9	
October 9	at Navy	Worden Field; Annapolis, MD	L 3–12	
October 16	at Franklin & Marshall	Williamson Field; Lancaster, PA	L 0–15	
October 23	Medico-Chirurgical	Neilson Field; New Brunswick, NJ	T 0–0	
October 30	at Hamilton	Steuben Field; Clinton, NY	W 8–5	
November 6	at NYU	Ohio Field; Bronx, NY	L 0–11	
November 10	Muhlenberg	Neilson Field; New Brunswick, NJ	W 35–5	
November 13	Haverford	Neilson Field; New Brunswick, NJ	W 11–0	
November 20	at Stevens	Stevens Field; Hoboken, NJ	L 5–17	
