= 1909 Trinity Bantams football team =

American college football season

1909 Trinity Bantams football
- Conference: Independent
- Record: 6–1–2
- Head coach: Raymond G. Gettell (2nd season)
- Captain: A. B. Henshaw
- Home stadium: Trinity Field

1909 Eastern college football independents records
	Conf.			Overall
Team	W	L	T	W		L		T
Yale		–		10	–	0	–	0
Lafayette		–		7	–	0	–	1
Franklin & Marshall		–		9	–	1	–	0
Harvard		–		9	–	1	–	0
Penn State		–		5	–	0	–	2
Washington & Jefferson		–		8	–	1	–	1
Springfield Training School		–		5	–	1	–	0
NYU		–		6	–	1	–	1
Ursinus		–		6	–	1	–	1
Penn		–		7	–	1	–	2
Trinity (CT)		–		6	–	1	–	2
Dartmouth		–		5	–	1	–	2
Fordham		–		5	–	1	–	2
Princeton		–		6	–	2	–	1
Pittsburgh		–		6	–	2	–	1
Carlisle		–		8	–	3	–	1
Colgate		–		5	–	2	–	1
Brown		–		7	–	3	–	1
Geneva		–		4	–	2	–	0
Carnegie Tech		–		5	–	3	–	1
Vermont		–		4	–	2	–	2
Lehigh		–		4	–	3	–	2
Army		–		3	–	2	–	0
Villanova		–		3	–	2	–	0
Dickinson		–		4	–	4	–	1
Syracuse		–		4	–	5	–	1
Bucknell		–		3	–	4	–	2
Boston College		–		3	–	4	–	1
Cornell		–		3	–	4	–	1
New Hampshire		–		3	–	4	–	0
Rhode Island State		–		3	–	4	–	0
Rutgers		–		3	–	5	–	1
Wesleyan		–		3	–	5	–	1
Holy Cross		–		2	–	4	–	2
Swarthmore		–		2	–	5	–	0
Drexel		–		1	–	5	–	3
Tufts		–		2	–	6	–	0
Amherst		–		1	–	6	–	1
Temple		–		0	–	4	–	1

The 1909 Trinity Bantams football team represented the Trinity College during the 1909 college football season.

== Schedule ==
Date	Time	Opponent	Site	Result	Source
October 2		Worcester Tech	Hartford, CT	W 12–6	
October 9		at Army	The Plain; West Point, NY	L 6–17	
October 16		at Holy Cross	Fitton Field; Worcester, MA	T 5–5	
October 23		Norwich	Hartford, CT	W 13–5	
October 30		at Colgate	Whitnall Field; Hamilton, NY	T 0–0	
November 6	3:00 p.m.	Connecticut	Trinity Field; Hartford, CT	W 64–0	
November 13		Norwich	Hartford, CT	W 12–6	
November 20		at Haverford	Haverford, PA	W 18–0	
November 25		at NYU	Ohio Field; Bronx, NY	Cancelled	
