= 1909 NYU Violets football team =

American college football season

1909 NYU Violets football
- Conference: Independent
- Record: 6–0–1
- Head coach: Herman Olcott (3rd season)
- Home stadium: Ohio Field

1909 Eastern college football independents records
	Conf.			Overall
Team	W	L	T	W		L		T
Yale		–		10	–	0	–	0
Lafayette		–		7	–	0	–	1
Franklin & Marshall		–		9	–	1	–	0
Harvard		–		9	–	1	–	0
Penn State		–		5	–	0	–	2
Washington & Jefferson		–		8	–	1	–	1
Springfield Training School		–		5	–	1	–	0
NYU		–		6	–	1	–	1
Ursinus		–		6	–	1	–	1
Penn		–		7	–	1	–	2
Trinity (CT)		–		6	–	1	–	2
Dartmouth		–		5	–	1	–	2
Fordham		–		5	–	1	–	2
Princeton		–		6	–	2	–	1
Pittsburgh		–		6	–	2	–	1
Carlisle		–		8	–	3	–	1
Colgate		–		5	–	2	–	1
Brown		–		7	–	3	–	1
Geneva		–		4	–	2	–	0
Carnegie Tech		–		5	–	3	–	1
Vermont		–		4	–	2	–	2
Lehigh		–		4	–	3	–	2
Army		–		3	–	2	–	0
Villanova		–		3	–	2	–	0
Dickinson		–		4	–	4	–	1
Syracuse		–		4	–	5	–	1
Bucknell		–		3	–	4	–	2
Boston College		–		3	–	4	–	1
Cornell		–		3	–	4	–	1
New Hampshire		–		3	–	4	–	0
Rhode Island State		–		3	–	4	–	0
Rutgers		–		3	–	5	–	1
Wesleyan		–		3	–	5	–	1
Holy Cross		–		2	–	4	–	2
Swarthmore		–		2	–	5	–	0
Drexel		–		1	–	5	–	3
Tufts		–		2	–	6	–	0
Amherst		–		1	–	6	–	1
Temple		–		0	–	4	–	1

The 1909 NYU Violets football team was an American football team that represented New York University as an independent during the 1909 college football season. In their third year under head coach Herman Olcott, the team compiled a 6–0–1 record.

== Schedule ==
Date	Opponent	Site	Result	Attendance	Source
October 9	Rhode Island State	Ohio Field; Bronx, NY	W 7–0		
October 16	Haverford	Ohio Field; Bronx, NY	W 29–0		
October 23	at Stevens	Hoboken, NJ	W 28–0		
November 2	Wesleyan	Ohio Field; Bronx, NY	W 13–12	4,000	
November 6	Rutgers	Ohio Field; Bronx, NY	W 11–0		
November 13	at Lehigh	Lehigh Field; South Bethlehem, PA	T 6–6		
November 20	Union (NY)	Ohio Field; Bronx, NY	W 47–0		
November 25	Trinity (CT)	Ohio Field; Bronx, NY	Cancelled		
