= 1909 Springfield Training School football team =

American college football season

1909 Springfield Training School football
- Conference: Independent
- Record: 5–1
- Head coach: James H. McCurdy (12th season)
- Captain: William N. Howard

1909 Eastern college football independents records
	Conf.			Overall
Team	W	L	T	W		L		T
Yale		–		10	–	0	–	0
Lafayette		–		7	–	0	–	1
Franklin & Marshall		–		9	–	1	–	0
Harvard		–		9	–	1	–	0
Penn State		–		5	–	0	–	2
Washington & Jefferson		–		8	–	1	–	1
Springfield Training School		–		5	–	1	–	0
NYU		–		6	–	1	–	1
Ursinus		–		6	–	1	–	1
Penn		–		7	–	1	–	2
Trinity (CT)		–		6	–	1	–	2
Dartmouth		–		5	–	1	–	2
Fordham		–		5	–	1	–	2
Princeton		–		6	–	2	–	1
Pittsburgh		–		6	–	2	–	1
Carlisle		–		8	–	3	–	1
Colgate		–		5	–	2	–	1
Brown		–		7	–	3	–	1
Geneva		–		4	–	2	–	0
Carnegie Tech		–		5	–	3	–	1
Vermont		–		4	–	2	–	2
Lehigh		–		4	–	3	–	2
Army		–		3	–	2	–	0
Villanova		–		3	–	2	–	0
Dickinson		–		4	–	4	–	1
Syracuse		–		4	–	5	–	1
Bucknell		–		3	–	4	–	2
Boston College		–		3	–	4	–	1
Cornell		–		3	–	4	–	1
New Hampshire		–		3	–	4	–	0
Rhode Island State		–		3	–	4	–	0
Rutgers		–		3	–	5	–	1
Wesleyan		–		3	–	5	–	1
Holy Cross		–		2	–	4	–	2
Swarthmore		–		2	–	5	–	0
Drexel		–		1	–	5	–	3
Tufts		–		2	–	6	–	0
Amherst		–		1	–	6	–	1
Temple		–		0	–	4	–	1

The 1909 Springfield Training School football team was an American football team that represented the International Young Men's Christian Association Training School—now known as Springfield College–as an independent during the 1909 college football season. Led by 12th-year head coach James H. McCurdy, Springfield compiled a record of 5–1.

== Schedule ==
Date	Opponent	Site	Result	Attendance	Source
September 25	Connecticut	Springfield, MA	Cancelled		
October 2	at Amherst	Pratt Field; Amherst, MA	W 6–5		
October 9	at Yale	Yale Field; New Haven, CT	L 0–36	6,000	
	Williston Seminary	Springfield, MA	W 6–0		
October 23	Worcester Tech	Springfield, MA	W 17–0		
October 30	at Tufts	Tufts athletic field; Medford, MA	W 6–5		
November 6	at Army	The Plain; West Point, NY	Cancelled		
November 13	Massachusetts	Springfield, MA	W 18–6		
