= 1909 Pittsburgh Panthers football team =

American college football season

1909 Pittsburgh Panthers football
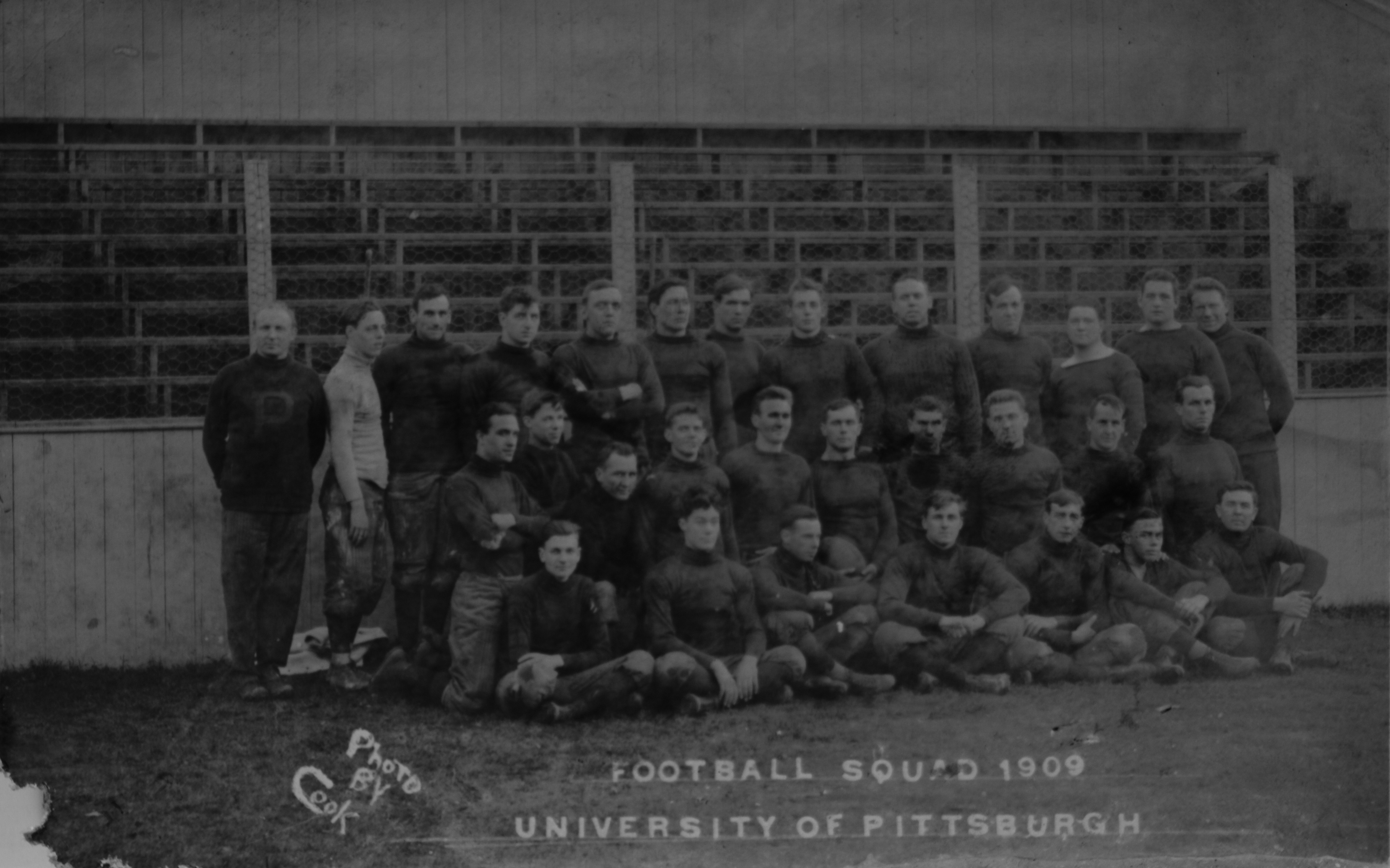
- Conference: Independent
- Record: 6–2–1
- Head coach: Joseph H. Thompson (1st season)
- Captain: Homer Roe
- Home stadium: Forbes Field

1909 Eastern college football independents records
| | Conf. | | | Overall |
| Team | W | L | T | W | | L | | T |
|---|---|---|---|---|---|---|---|---|
| Yale | | – | | 10 | – | 0 | – | 0 |
| Lafayette | | – | | 7 | – | 0 | – | 1 |
| Franklin & Marshall | | – | | 9 | – | 1 | – | 0 |
| Harvard | | – | | 9 | – | 1 | – | 0 |
| Penn State | | – | | 5 | – | 0 | – | 2 |
| Washington & Jefferson | | – | | 8 | – | 1 | – | 1 |
| Springfield Training School | | – | | 5 | – | 1 | – | 0 |
| NYU | | – | | 6 | – | 1 | – | 1 |
| Ursinus | | – | | 6 | – | 1 | – | 1 |
| Penn | | – | | 7 | – | 1 | – | 2 |
| Trinity (CT) | | – | | 6 | – | 1 | – | 2 |
| Dartmouth | | – | | 5 | – | 1 | – | 2 |
| Fordham | | – | | 5 | – | 1 | – | 2 |
| Princeton | | – | | 6 | – | 2 | – | 1 |
| Pittsburgh | | – | | 6 | – | 2 | – | 1 |
| Carlisle | | – | | 8 | – | 3 | – | 1 |
| Colgate | | – | | 5 | – | 2 | – | 1 |
| Brown | | – | | 7 | – | 3 | – | 1 |
| Geneva | | – | | 4 | – | 2 | – | 0 |
| Carnegie Tech | | – | | 5 | – | 3 | – | 1 |
| Vermont | | – | | 4 | – | 2 | – | 2 |
| Lehigh | | – | | 4 | – | 3 | – | 2 |
| Army | | – | | 3 | – | 2 | – | 0 |
| Villanova | | – | | 3 | – | 2 | – | 0 |
| Dickinson | | – | | 4 | – | 4 | – | 1 |
| Syracuse | | – | | 4 | – | 5 | – | 1 |
| Bucknell | | – | | 3 | – | 4 | – | 2 |
| Boston College | | – | | 3 | – | 4 | – | 1 |
| Cornell | | – | | 3 | – | 4 | – | 1 |
| New Hampshire | | – | | 3 | – | 4 | – | 0 |
| Rhode Island State | | – | | 3 | – | 4 | – | 0 |
| Rutgers | | – | | 3 | – | 5 | – | 1 |
| Wesleyan | | – | | 3 | – | 5 | – | 1 |
| Holy Cross | | – | | 2 | – | 4 | – | 2 |
| Swarthmore | | – | | 2 | – | 5 | – | 0 |
| Drexel | | – | | 1 | – | 5 | – | 3 |
| Tufts | | – | | 2 | – | 6 | – | 0 |
| Amherst | | – | | 1 | – | 6 | – | 1 |
| Temple | | – | | 0 | – | 4 | – | 1 |

The 1909 Pittsburgh Panthers football team was an American football team that represented the University of Pittsburgh as an independent during the 1909 college football season.

== Schedule ==
| Date | Opponent | Site | Result | Attendance | Source |
|---|---|---|---|---|---|
| October 2 | Ohio Northern | Exposition Park; Pittsburgh, PA | W 16–0 | 2,000 | |
| October 9 | Marietta | Exposition Park; Pittsburgh, PA | W 12–0 | | |
| October 16 | Bucknell | Forbes Field; Pittsburgh, PA | W 18–6 | | |
| October 23 | Carlisle | Forbes Field; Pittsburgh, PA | W 14–3 | 4,000 | |
| October 30 | Notre Dame | Forbes Field; Pittsburgh, PA (rivalry) | L 0–6 | 6,000 | |
| November 6 | at West Virginia | Morgantown, WV (rivalry) | T 0–0 | 3,000 | |
| November 13 | Washington & Jefferson | Forbes Field; Pittsburgh, PA | W 17–3 | 12,000 | |
| November 20 | Mount Union | Forbes Field; Pittsburgh, PA | W 17–3 | | |
| November 25 | Penn State | Forbes Field; Pittsburgh, PA (rivalry) | L 0–5 | 15,000 | |

== Season recap ==
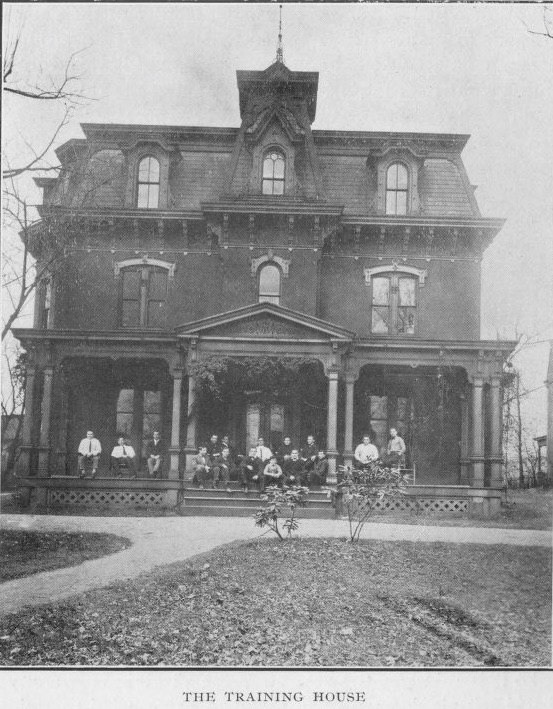

The 1908 football season was the end of the coach John A. Moorhead era at Pitt. The General Athletic Committee was charged with finding a suitable replacement. The two leading candidates were Frank Piekarski and Joseph H. Thompson. Mr. Piekarski was an All-American guard at the University of Pennsylvania from 1901 to 1904. He was head football coach at Washington & Jefferson University from 1905 to 1907 and led the Red and Black to a 25–7 record. Joe Thompson started his college football career at Geneva in 1900 and finished up with the 1905 Western University of Pennsylvania team. He wanted to be coach in 1905 and 1906 but did not get hired. While attending law school he coached football at Pittsburgh High School for the 1906 season and at Carnegie Tech for the 1907 season.

Some members of the Pitt student body remembered the uncomfortable situation between Coach Mosse and Mr. Thompson and demanded that their representative on the committee vote against Thompson. On February 17, after two meetings, heated discussions and numerous votes, Joseph H. Thompson was elected track and football coach for the 1909 season. Floyd Rose, former WUP quarterback, was hired as assistant coach.

Homer Roe was elected captain by his teammates. The graduate manager of athletics, Alexander Silverman, was advanced to full professorship and replaced by Laurence Hurst. Since the campus was moved to Oakland, a sixteen-room training house was secured at 3456 Bouquet Street.

The home football games were played at Forbes Field which opened on June 30, 1909.

The major rule changes for the 1909 season were that field goals would be worth three points, if two penalties occurred on the same play the offended team could choose which one to impose and touchbacks were brought out to the twenty-five yard line.

In the fall of 1909 students and alumni met to discuss school spirit and George M.P. Baird (class of 1909) was given credit for suggesting the Panther (felis concolor) as the University animal. Coach Thompson quieted his critics as he took four returning starters and eight holdovers from the 1908 team along with the new recruits and led the Pitt squad to a 6–2–1 record and outscored opponents by a total of 94–26.

== Coaching staff ==
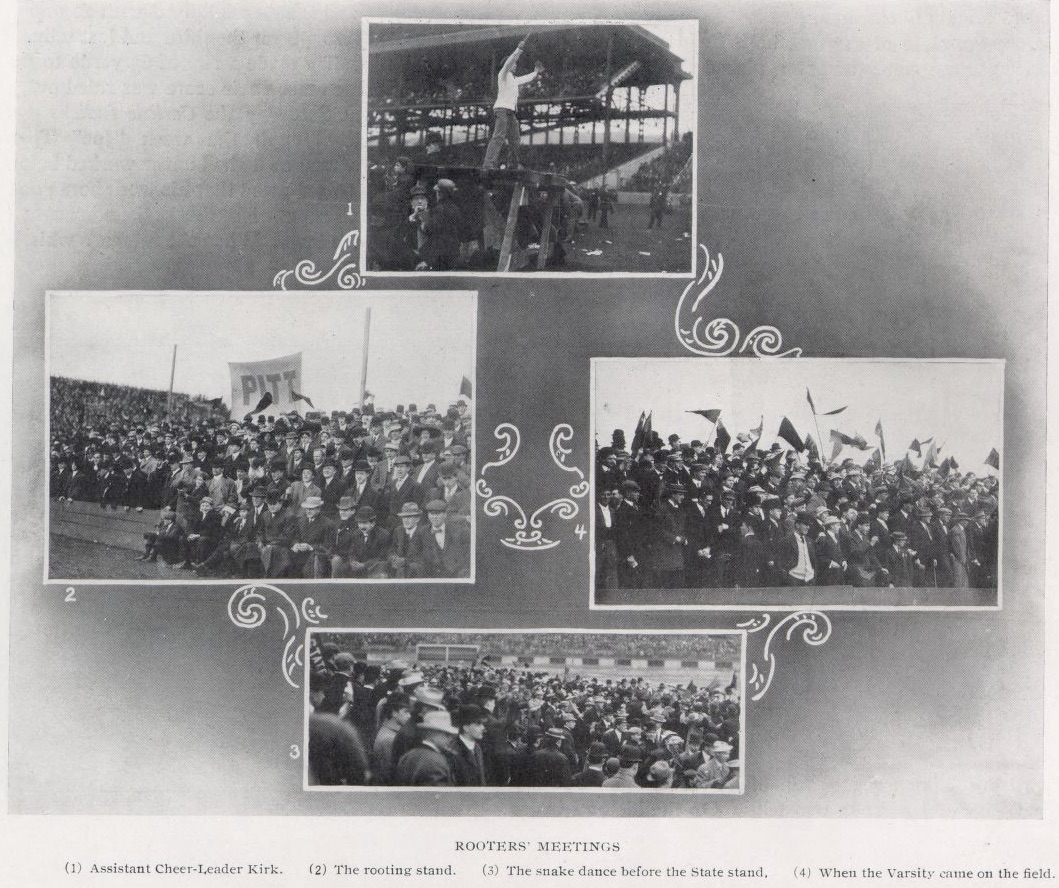

1909 Pittsburgh Panthers football staff
| Coaching staff: Joseph H. Thompson – Head coach; Floyd Rose – Assistant backfield coach; Alexander Stevenson – Assistant line coach; Jim Cosgrove - Line coach; Jud Schmidt - Backfield coach | Support staff: Laurence Hurst – Graduate manager of athletics |

== Roster ==
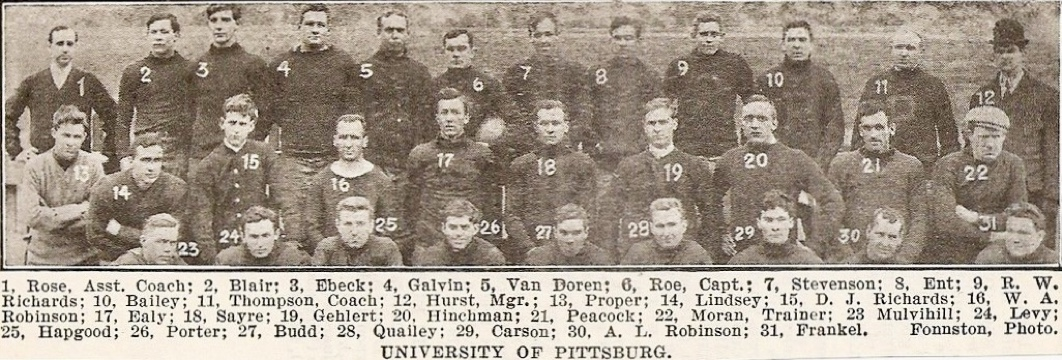

1909 Pittsburgh Panther football roster
| Player | Position | Games | Height | Weight | Class | Prep School | Degree | Residence |
|---|---|---|---|---|---|---|---|---|
| Homer Roe^ | end | 7 | 5' 8" | 162 | 1910 | Allegheny H.S. | Doctor of Dental Surgery | Pittsburgh, PA |
| Frank Van Doren^ | tackle | 8 | 6' 1" | 212 | 1911 | Warrensburg Normal | Doctor of Medicine | Seaside, OR |
| Henry A. Blair^ | tackle | 8 | 6' | 185 | 1912 | Allegheny H.S. | Dental Department | |
| Ralph Galvin^ | center | 9 | 6' | 220 | 1913 | New Brighton H.S. | Doctor of Dental Surgery | New Brighton, PA |
| George Bailey^ | tackle | 8 | 5' 10" | 178 | 1911 | East Stroudsburg Normal | Doctor of Dental Surgery | Scranton, PA |
| James Stevenson^ | tackle | 9 | 6' | 198 | 1912 | Chester H.S. (WVA) | Doctor of Medicine | Pittsburgh, PA |
| John “Jack” Lindsay^ | end | 6 | 5' 11" | 155 | 1912 | Johnstown H.S. | Doctor of Dental Surgery | Johnstown, PA |
| William Robinson^ | quarterback | 7 | 5' 8" | 148 | 1912 | Morgan Park Academy | School of Engineering & Mines | Aurora, PA |
| Art Robinson^ | halfback | 7 | 5' 9" | 158 | | Morgan Park Academy | | Aurora, PA |
| Robert “Tex”Richards^ | tackle | 9 | 5' 11" | 175 | 1910 | Wilkinsburg H.S. | Mechanical Engineering | Butler, PA |
| Harry U. Ent^ | halfback | 9 | 6' | 170 | 1912 | Ridgway H.S. | Law School | |
| Norman Budd^ | quarterback | 7 | 5' 8" | 150 | 1911 | Sharon H.S. | Associate Dental | Farrell, PA |
| Charles Quailey^ | halfback | 9 | 5' 9" | 158 | 1912 | Dennison H.S. | Doctor of Dental Surgery | Pittsburgh, PA |
| Clarence Hapgood | quarterback | 5 | 5' 7" | 140 | 1911 | Warren H.S. | Doctor of Dental Surgery | Erie, PA |
| Raymond Butler^ | halfback | 5 | 5' 7" | 135 | 1910 | Pittsburg H.S. | Doctor of Dental Surgery | Sharon, PA |
| Marion Sayre | center | 1 | 5' 10" | 185 | 1912 | New Brighton H.S. | Associate Medical | Philadelphia, PA |
| David J. Richards | fullback | 1 | | | 1913 | Wilkinsburg H.S. | Associate Engineering | Verona, PA |
| George Gehlert | guard | 3 | 5' 11" | 205 | 1913 | Villa Nova Prep | Doctor of Dental Surgery | Hannah, ND |
| Herbert Dewar^ | quarterback | 4 | 5' 7" | 147 | 1912 | California Normal | Doctor of Dental Surgery | Elizabeth, PA |
| Walter Hinchman | guard | 1 | 5' 10" | 135 | 1912 | Edgewood H.S. | Doctor of Dental Surgery | McKeesport, PA |
| Ross Feightner^ | tackle | 7 | 5' 11" | 188 | 1912 | Greensburg H.S. | Doctor of Dental Surgery | Greensburg, PA |
| Robert J. Peacock^ | end | 8 | 5' 11" | 170 | 1911 | Dennison College | Doctor of Dental Surgery | Houston, PA |
| William Leahy^ | guard | 6 | 5' 10" | 210 | 1914 | Allegheny H.S. | enrolled in Dental School | |
| John “Red” Frankel^ | guard | 9 | 5' 7" | 185 | | Pittsburgh H.S. | | |
| William Hardie | halfback | 1 | | | 1912 | | Dental School | |
| Porter | halfback | 2 | 5' 9" | 155 | | Washington H.S. | | |
| Levy | halfback | 1 | | | | | | |
^ Lettermen

== Game summaries ==
=== Ohio Northern ===
Ohio Northern at Pitt

| Team | 1 | 2 | Total |
|---|---|---|---|
| Ohio Northern | 0 | 0 | 0 |
| • Pitt | 11 | 5 | 16 |

- Date: October 2, 1909
- Location: Exposition Park (Pittsburgh)·Pittsburgh
- Game attendance: 2,000
- Referee: John R. Simpson (Franklin & Marshall)

On October 2, the Joe Thompson era started at Exposition Park in front of two thousand onlookers against the Ohio Northern University Polar Bears from Ada, Ohio. The inexperience of the Pitt squad was evident at first, but halfway through the first half the offense, behind the running of "Tex" Richards and Homer Roe, was able to sustain a drive and score a touchdown. "Tex" Richards carried the pigskin the final ten yards for the first score. Frank Van Doren missed the goal after. Six minutes later Richards and Harry Ent advanced the ball to the visitors five and Ent plunged into the end zone for the second touchdown of the half. Van Doren was successful on the goal after and Pitt led 11–0 at the break.

Coach Thompson made wholesale substitutions for the second half. Will Robinson replaced Norman Budd at quarterback for the second half. He broke away for a fifty-yard scoring jaunt but the referee called offside. The Pitt second string offense did manage one long drive that culminated in a five-yard dash into the end zone by Dave Richards. Van Doren missed the point after. The final score read 16–0. Ohio Northern finished the season with a 1–4 record.

The Pitt starting lineup for the game against Ohio Northern was Homer Roe (left end), Frank Van Doren (left tackle), Henry Blair (left guard), Ralph Galvin (center), George Bailey (right guard), James Stevenson (right tackle), Clarence Hapgood (right end), Norman Budd (quarterback), Charles Quailey (left halfback), Harry Ent (right halfback), and Tex Richards (fullback). Substitutions made during the game were: Raymond Butler replaced Homer Roe at left end; Walter Henchman replaced Henry Blair at left guard; W. Leahy replaced Ralph Galvin at center; Red Frankel replaced George Bailey at right guard; Robert Peacock replaced Clarence Hapgood at right end; Will Robinson replaced Norman Budd at quarterback; William Hardie replaced Harry Ent at right halfback; and Dave Richards replaced Tex Richards at fullback. The game consisted of one twenty-five minute half and one twenty minute half.

=== Marietta ===
Marietta at Pitt

| Team | 1 | 2 | Total |
|---|---|---|---|
| Marietta | 0 | 0 | 0 |
| • Pitt | 6 | 6 | 12 |

- Date: October 9, 1909
- Location: Exposition Park (Pittsburgh)·Pittsburgh
- Referee: John R. Simpson (Franklin & Marshall)

The kick-off time for the Marietta College Pioneers game was changed from 3 p.m. to 10 a.m. because the Pirates were playing in the World Series. Pitt hoped some baseball fans would visit Exposition Park for football prior to going to Forbes Field for baseball. The Marietta team was the same veteran club that gave Pitt a scare the previous two years. Pitt's starting ends (Homer Roe and Jack Lindsay) were both out with injuries.

The Marietta offense spent most of the first half in Pitt territory but could not score. Late in the half Pitt substitute end Norman Budd picked up a Marietta fumble and raced sixty-five yards for the touchdown. Center Ralph Galvin kicked the point after. Pitt led 6–0 at the break.

In the early moments of the second half Pitt quarterback Bill Robinson returned a punt forty-five yards for a touchdown. Galvin was successful on the point after and Pitt led 12–0. The Pitt offense was rejuvenated and spent the rest of the game on Marietta's side of the field, but could not again penetrate the Marietta goal line. The unfortunate part of the game was the unsportsmanlike conduct of Marietta halfback Nutter. Prior to Marietta, he played at VPI and West Virginia. The lineup presented by Marietta listed him as Miller but a few minutes into the game the Pitt eleven recognized who he was. Field Judge Sam Caruthers made a decision that was reversed by the umpire. An infuriated Mr. Nutter punched Mr. Caruthers. Surprisingly, he was not disqualified or penalized. Minutes later he punched Pitt tackle Frank Van Doren, which caused the crowd to voice their displeasure with the proceedings. The police finally escorted Mr. Nutter from the premises. Marietta finished the season with a 4–3 record. The Pitt Athletic Committee decided that Marietta College would no longer be on the schedule.

The Pitt starting lineup for the game against Marietta was Norman Budd (left end), Frank Van Doren (left tackle), Henry Blair (left guard), Ralph Galvin (center), George Bailey (right guard), James Stevenson (right tackle), Clarence Hapgood (right end), Bill Robinson (quarterback), Charles Quailey (left halfback), Art Robinson (right halfback), and Tex Richards (fullback). At some point during the game Red Frankel replaced George Bailey at right guard and Harry Ent replaced Art Robinson at right halfback. The game consisted of one twenty-five minute half and one twenty minute half.

=== Bucknell ===
Bucknell at Pitt

| Team | 1 | 2 | Total |
|---|---|---|---|
| Bucknell | 6 | 0 | 6 |
| • Pitt | 12 | 6 | 18 |

- Date: October 16, 1909
- Location: Forbes Field·Pittsburgh
- Referee: William F. Knox (Yale)

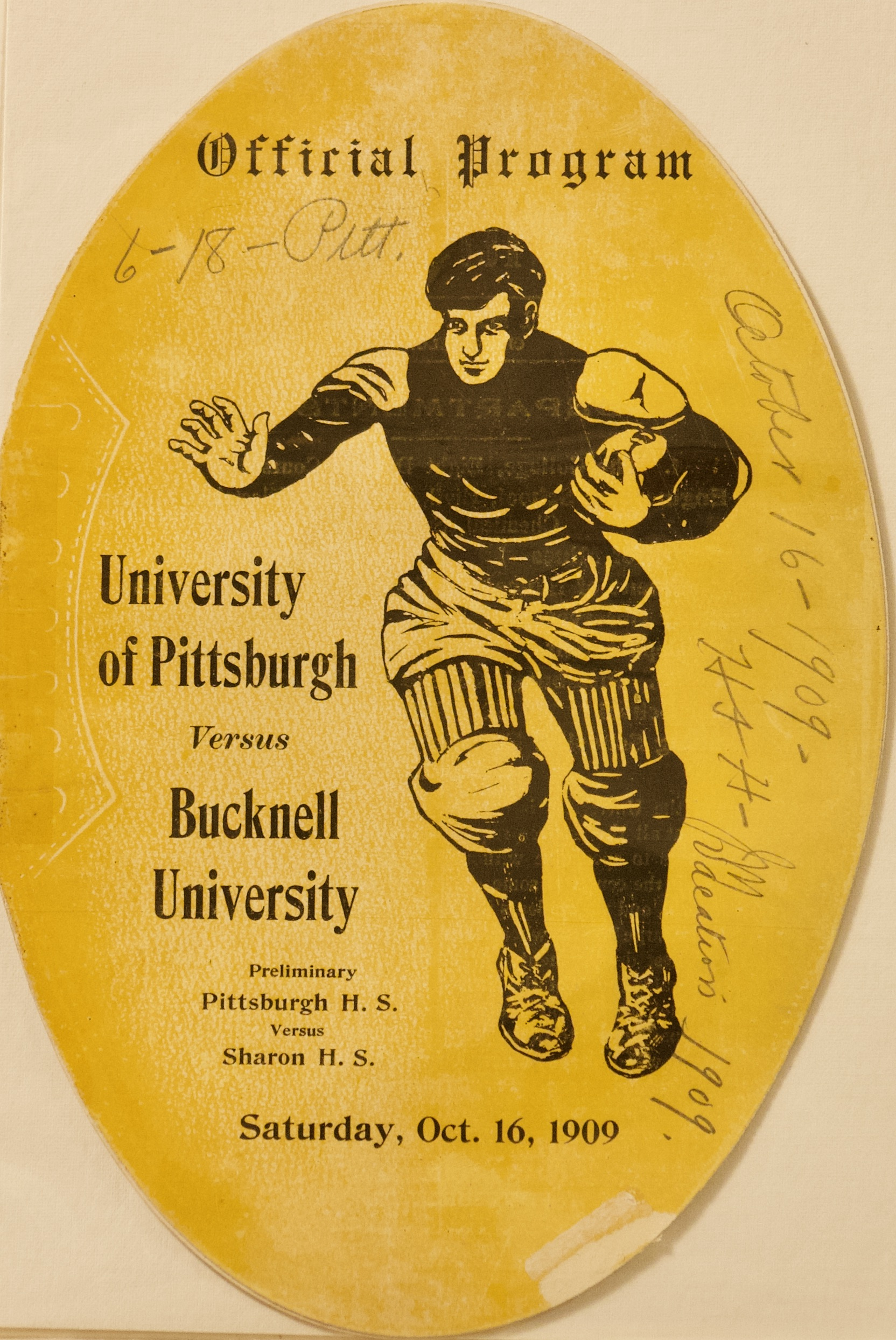
Program for October 16, 1909 game vs. Bucknell

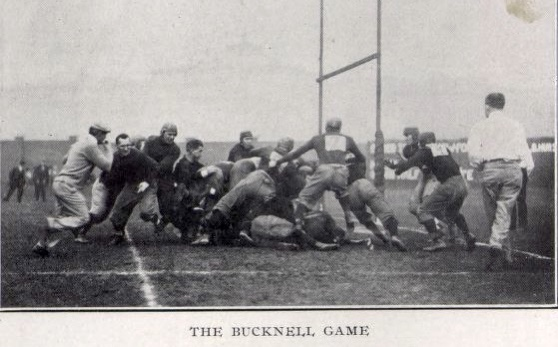
Goal line play in 1909 Bucknell game

On October 16 Pitt played their first game at Forbes Field against the Bucknell from Lewisburg, Pa. The final game of the World Series between the Pirates and Tigers was played in Detroit at the same time. The baseball game updates were bulletined to the crowd every inning.

Pitt played great football from the start. They moved the ball into Bucknell territory and punted to Bucknell on their twenty. On second down Bucknell halfback Clark fumbled and Pitt back Harry Ent scooped up the pigskin and scampered for the first score of the game. Ralph Galvin was successful on the point after. Pitt led 6–0. On Bucknell's next possession the Pitt defense stiffened and forced a punt. Quarterback O'Brien of Bucknell punted over the goal and into the bleachers. Pitt thought the ball was dead and ignored it. Bucknell end Campuzanno vaulted a fence and recovered the ball. Knox, the referee, called touchdown Bucknell. O'Brien made the point after and the score was tied. Pitt argued to no avail and after the game Mr. Knox admitted he made an error. On Pitt's next possession Bucknell's defense forced a punt and their quarterback O'Brien fumbled. Pitt halfback Charles Quailey recovered on the Bison twenty yard line. On first down fullback “Tex” Richards raced the twenty yards into the end zone for a touchdown. The play was called back for hurdling. In spite of the penalty, “Tex” Richards scored again a few plays later. Ralph Galvin kicked the point after and Pitt led at halftime 12–6.

The second half was played in Bucknell territory. Pitt scored early in the half on a plunge by Richards with Galvin adding the point after. Coach Thompson made wholesale substitutions. Pitt came close to scoring again twice but lost the ball on downs and a fumble. The final score was 18–6.

Bucknell finished the season with a 3–4–2 record.

The Pitt starting lineup for the game against Bucknell was Homer Roe (left end), Henry Blair (left tackle), George Gehlert (left guard), Ralph Galvin (center), Red Frankel (right guard), James Stevenson (right tackle), Jack Lindsay (right end), Norman Budd (quarterback), Charles Quailey (left halfback), Harry Ent (right halfback), and Tex Richards (fullback). Substitutions made during the game were: Frank Van Doren replaced Henry Blair at left tackle; Henry Blair replaced George Gehlert at left guard; Robert Peacock replaced Red Frankel at right guard; George Bailey replaced James Stevenson at right tackle; Clarence Hapgood replaced Jack Lindsay at right end; Levy replaced Charles Quailey at left halfback; Feightner replaced Harry Ent at right halfback; Raymond Butler replaced Homer Roe at left end; and Porter replaced Clarence Hapgood at right end. The game was played in 25-minute halves.

=== Carlisle ===
Carlisle at Pitt

| Team | 1 | 2 | Total |
|---|---|---|---|
| Carlisle | 3 | 0 | 3 |
| • Pitt | 6 | 8 | 14 |

- Date: October 23, 1909
- Location: Forbes Field·Pittsburgh
- Game attendance: 4,000
- Referee: Lt. H. B. Hackett (West Point)

In 1908 the Carlisle Indian football team was welcomed to Exposition Park that was covered with three inches of snow. On October 23, 1909, the Carlisle Indian football team was welcomed to Forbes Field that was covered in more than six inches of mud. Four thousand brave fans sat through the steady downpour to cheer on their team.

Early in the game Pitt moved the ball into Carlisle territory. After an exchange of punts and a fumble recovery, Pitt had the ball on Carlisle's fifteen yard line. Six plays later they turned the ball over on downs at the six. Carlisle punted out of danger. Pitt tried an onside kick that was recovered by Carlisle on the one yard line. Carlisle punted out to the twenty-seven yard line. Ralph Galvin missed a field goal. Carlisle got possession on the twenty-five and could not penetrate the Pitt defense. The Indians punted to Homer Roe and he raced fifty-eight yards for the touchdown. Galvin made the point after and Pitt led 6–0. The Carlisle offense then got to work in Pitt territory. On three successive possessions the Indians tried field goals. Houser missed the first from thirty yards out. Libby missed from twenty-five as the ball hit the upright. Finally, Houser sent the ball through the uprights from the fifteen and the score at halftime was 6–3.

Early in the second half Galvin was successful on a thirty-three yard field goal to increase the lead to 9–3. Pitt managed to get into scoring territory but turned the ball over on downs at the one foot line. A punting duel ensued and Pitt finally possessed the ball on Carlisle's nine yard line. Tex Richards bulled his way through the muck into the end zone for the final score of the game. The final score was 14–3. Carlisle finished the season with an 8–3–1 record.

The Pitt starting lineup for the game against Carlisle was Homer Roe (left end), Frank Van Doren (left tackle), Henry Blair (left guard), Ralph Galvin (center), Red Frankel (right guard), James Stevenson (right tackle), Jack Lindsay (right end), Norman Budd (quarterback), Charles Quailey (left halfback), Harry Ent (right halfback), and Tex Richards (fullback). Substitutions made during the game were: Ray Butler replaced Homer Roe at left end; George Gehlert replaced Henry Blair at left guard; George Bailey replaced Red Frankel at right guard; Robert Peacock replaced Jack Lindsay at right end; Art Robinson replaced Charles Quailey at left halfback; and Ross Feightner replaced Tex Richards at fullback. The game was played in 35-minute halves.

=== Notre Dame ===
Notre Dame at Pitt

| Team | 1 | 2 | Total |
|---|---|---|---|
| • Notre Dame | 6 | 0 | 6 |
| Pitt | 0 | 0 | 0 |

- Date: October 30, 1909
- Location: Forbes Field·Pittsburgh
- Game attendance: 6,000
- Referee: Haywood M. Butler (Brown)

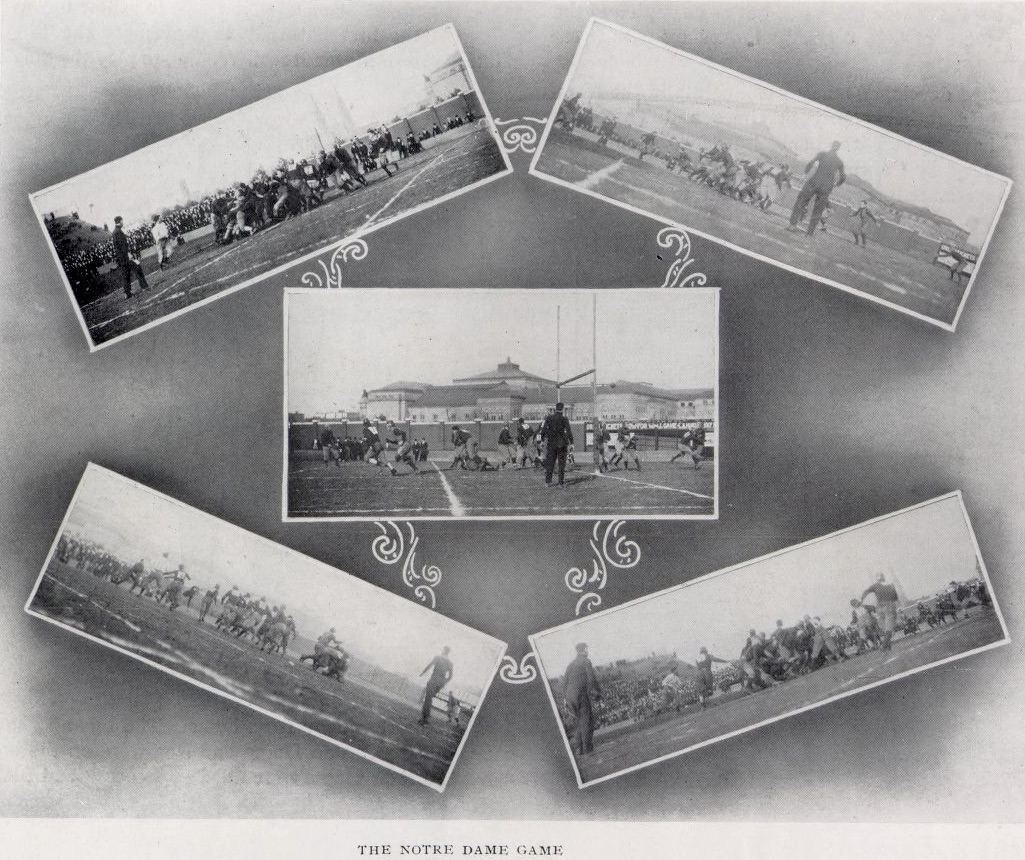

On October 30, in beautiful fall weather, six thousand fans welcomed the Notre Dame football team to Pittsburgh for the first game in what would become a major rivalry.

Notre Dame scored on a forward pass from Hamilton to Matthews four minutes into the first half. Mathews kicked the point after and Notre Dame led 6–0. Pitt was able to move the ball against the heavier Irish but fumbles, penalties and the Irish defense stymied their efforts to get into the end zone. At the end of the half Pitt drove the ball to the one yard line of Notre Dame only to lose the ball on downs.

Most of the second half saw the Pitt defense preventing the Irish offense from adding to the score. Coach Thompson substituted fresh bodies into the lineup, but the Irish defense was too strong and rendered the Pitt offense ineffective. The Irish missed two field goals. Vaughan tried from thirty-eight yards and Ryan tried from seventeen yards. Notre Dame halfback Dwyer thought he caught a touchdown pass but referee Butler ruled otherwise. Mr. Dwyer punched Mr. Butler and was immediately disqualified. Pitt tackle Frank Van Doren injured his ribcage late in the game. Pitt had the ball on the Notre Dame twenty-eight yard line as time expired. Notre Dame won the game 6–0 and they would finish the season with a 7–0–1 record.

The Pitt starting lineup for the game against Notre Dame was Homer Roe (left end), Frank Van Doren (left tackle), Henry Blair (left guard), Ralph Galvin (center), Red Frankel (right guard), James Stevenson (right tackle), Jack Lindsay (right end), Norman Budd (quarterback), Charles Quailey (left halfback), Harry Ent (right halfback), and Tex Richards (fullback). Substitutions made during the game were: Will Robinson replaced Norman Budd at quarterback; Norman Budd replaced Jack Lindsay at right end; Robert Peacock replaced Frank Van Doren at left tackle; Ray Butler replaced Norman Budd at right end; Art Robinson replaced Harry Ent at right halfback; W. Leahy replaced Henry Blair at left guard; George Bailey replaced Red Frankel at right guard; and Ross Feightner replaced Charles Quailey at left halfback. The game was played in 30-minute halves.

=== At West Virginia ===
Pitt at West Virginia

| Team | 1 | 2 | Total |
|---|---|---|---|
| Pitt | 0 | 0 | 0 |
| West Virginia | 0 | 0 | 0 |

- Date: November 6, 1909
- Location: Morgantown, West Virginia
- Game attendance: 3,000
- Referee: A. King Dickson (U. of Pennsylvania

On November 6 the Pitt football team and some one hundred students and alumni took the B. & O. Railroad to Morgantown, West Virginia for the 1909 edition of the Backyard Brawl. After losing five of the first six games of this series, Pitt was now on a four-game win streak. Pitt was missing two starters from its lineup, Frank Van Doren and Captain Homer Roe due to injuries. Tillie Dewar, a graduate transfer from Washington & Jefferson, became eligible and replaced Roe at end. Robert Peacock replaced Van Doren at tackle. A morning rain rendered the field muddy, but the sun appeared at game time and three thousand fans came through the turnstile.

On Pitt's first possession they carried the ball methodically down the field to West Virginia's five yard line. On first and goal quarterback Budd fumbled the hand-off and West Virginia fullback Springer (former Pitt fullback) recovered. The remainder of the first half was played in Mountaineer territory but Pitt was unable to capitalize. Ralph Galvin missed three field goal tries.

The second half was more of the same as the Pitt offense advanced the ball to the Mountaineer's thirteen yard line and turned it over on downs. The Pitt defense played good football, but the offense was stymied by fumbles, penalties and the slick footing. The Mountaineers won a moral victory with the 0–0 tie. West Virginia finished the season with a 4–3–2 record.

The Pitt starting lineup for the game against West Virginia was Tillie Dewar (left end), Robert Peacock (left tackle), W. Leahy (left guard), Ralph Galvin (center), Red Frankel (right guard), James Stevenson (right tackle), Jack Lindsay (right end), Norman Budd (quarterback), Art Robinson (left halfback), Harry Ent (right halfback), and Tex Richards (fullback). Substitutions made during the game were: Will Robinson replaced Norman Budd at quarterback; Charles Quailey replaced Art Robinson at left halfback; Henry Blair replaced Robert Peacock at left tackle; George Bailey replaced Red Frankel at right guard; Clarence Hapgood replaced Jack Lindsay at right end; Ross Feightner replaced Harry Ent at right halfback; George Gehlert replaced W. Leahy at left guard; and Ray Butler replaced Tillie Dewar at left end. The game consisted of one thirty minute half and one twenty minute half.

=== Washington & Jefferson ===
Washington & Jefferson at Pitt

| Team | 1 | 2 | Total |
|---|---|---|---|
| Washington & Jefferson | 0 | 3 | 3 |
| • Pitt | 12 | 5 | 17 |

- Date: November 13, 1909
- Location: Forbes Field·Pittsburgh
- Game attendance: 12,000
- Referee: James H. Moffatt (Princeton)

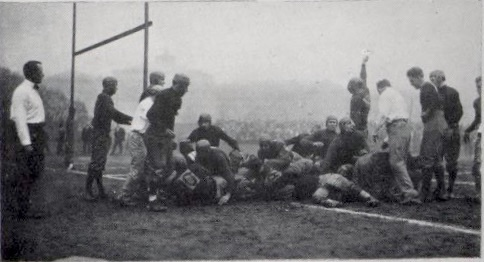
Pitt scores second touchdown vs. W. & J. in 1909 game

On November 13 the undefeated Washington & Jefferson Red and Black arrived at Forbes Field to attempt to extend their three-game winning streak over the Pitt eleven. Pitt's record against the Red and Black was 1–8. Over 12,000 fans packed the bleachers to cheer on their team. Both teams had bands which marched with students and fans through town into the stadium prior to kick off. The Pitt team was at full strength for this encounter.

Pitt's Ralph Galvin kicked off to W & J halfback Bill Marshall and he returned the ball to the Red and Black 20-yard line. On the first scrimmage play W & J quarterback Forsythe fumbled the hand off to Marshall and Frank Van Doren recovered for Pitt on the sixteen yard line. Two quarterback runs advanced the ball to the five and finally fullback "Tex" Richards bulled his way into the end zone for the first Pitt touchdown. Ralph Galvin kicked the point after and Pitt led 6–0 after two minutes of play. Later in the half, Pitt had the ball on the Red and Black 31-yard line. On first down quarterback Bill Robinson completed a forward pass to Homer Roe for a gain of twenty-seven yards to the four. On second and goal Richards again plunged into the end zone for the score. Galvin was successful on the point after and Pitt led 12–0 at the break.

Early in the second half W & J Captain Freitag kicked a thirty-four yard field goal to put the Red and Black on the scoreboard. The Pitt defense did not allow another score and held the Red and Black to one first down the entire game. A flubbed punt allowed Pitt to gain possession on the Red and Black 14-yard line. Quarterback Will Robinson gained five yards and an off sides penalty advanced the ball to the four. On second down halfback Art Robinson followed tackle Van Doren into the end zone. Galvin missed the point after and Pitt held on to win 17–3. Washington & Jefferson finished the season with a 8–1–1 record.

The Pitt starting lineup for the game against Wash. & Jeff. was Homer Roe (left end), Frank Van Doren (left tackle), William Leahy (left guard), Ralph Galvin (center), Red Frankel (right guard), James Stevenson (right tackle), Jack Lindsay (right end), William Robinson (quarterback), Art Robinson (left halfback), Harry Ent (right halfback), and Tex Richards (fullback). Substitutions made during the game were: Tillie Dewar replaced Homer Roe at left end; George Bailey replaced Red Frankel at right guard; Robert Peacock replaced Jack Lindsay at right end; Charles Quailey replaced Art Robinson at left halfback; and Ross Feightner replaced Harry Ent at right halfback. The game was played in 35-minute halves.

=== Mount Union ===
Mount Union at Pitt

| Team | 1 | 2 | Total |
|---|---|---|---|
| Mount Union | 3 | 0 | 3 |
| • Pitt | 0 | 17 | 17 |

- Date: November 20, 1909
- Location: Forbes Field·Pittsburgh
- Referee: Harry C. Fry Jr. (Fort Pitt A.C.)

The Mount Union College football team from Alliance, Ohio was the warm-up opponent before the Thanksgiving Day battle with Pennsylvania State College. Coach Thompson started the scrub team and according to The Pittsburgh Sunday Post, "Both teams put up a poor exhibition of football".

In the first half, Pitt quarterback Norman Budd fumbled a punt and Mount Union recovered on the Pitt twenty yard line. The Pitt defense held, but Mount Union guard McGregor booted a thirty-yard field goal for a 3–0 lead for the visitors. Later in the half, Pitt fullback Ross Feightner recovered a fumble on the Mount Union twenty yard line. On first down halfback Charles Quailey gained five yards and fumbled the ball back to the guests. Coach Thompson was not happy at halftime.

Pitt received the second half kick off. Halfback Quailey carried three straight plays and gained fifty yards to Mount Union's twenty yard line. From there, he and fullback Feightner advanced the ball to the five. On first down Feightner bulled his way into the end zone for Pitt's first score. Budd missed the point after and Pitt led 5–3. On the next kickoff Quailey fielded the ball on the six and raced one hundred and four yards for a touchdown. The point after was successful and Pitt led 11–3. Coach Thompson sent the first team into the game for the closing minutes and "Tex" Richards scored a touchdown to make the final 17–3. Mount Union finished the season with an 8–2 record.

The Pitt starting lineup for the game against Mount Union was Clarence Hapgood (left end), Robert Peacock (left tackle), Henry Blair (left guard), Marion Sayre (center), George Bailey (right guard), James Stevenson (right tackle), Tillie Dewar (right end), Norman Budd (quarterback), Charles Quailey (left halfback), Porter (right halfback), and Ross Feightner (fullback). Substitutions made during the game were: Will Robinson replaced Norman Budd at quarterback; Frank Van Doren replaced Robert Peacock at left tackle; Art Robinson replaced Charles Quailey at left halfback; W. Leahy replaced Marion Sayre at center; Ralph Galvin replaced W. Leahy at center; Tex Richards replaced Ross Feightner at fullback; Homer Roe replaced Clarence Hapgood at left end; Red Frankel replaced George Bailey at right guard; and Harry Ent replaced Porter at right halfback. The game consisted of one twenty-five minute half and one twenty minute half.

=== Penn State ===
Penn State at Pitt

| Team | 1 | 2 | Total |
|---|---|---|---|
| • Penn State | 5 | 0 | 5 |
| Pitt | 0 | 0 | 0 |

- Date: November 25, 1909
- Location: Forbes Field·Pittsburgh
- Game attendance: 15,000
- Referee: M. J. Thompson (Georgetown)

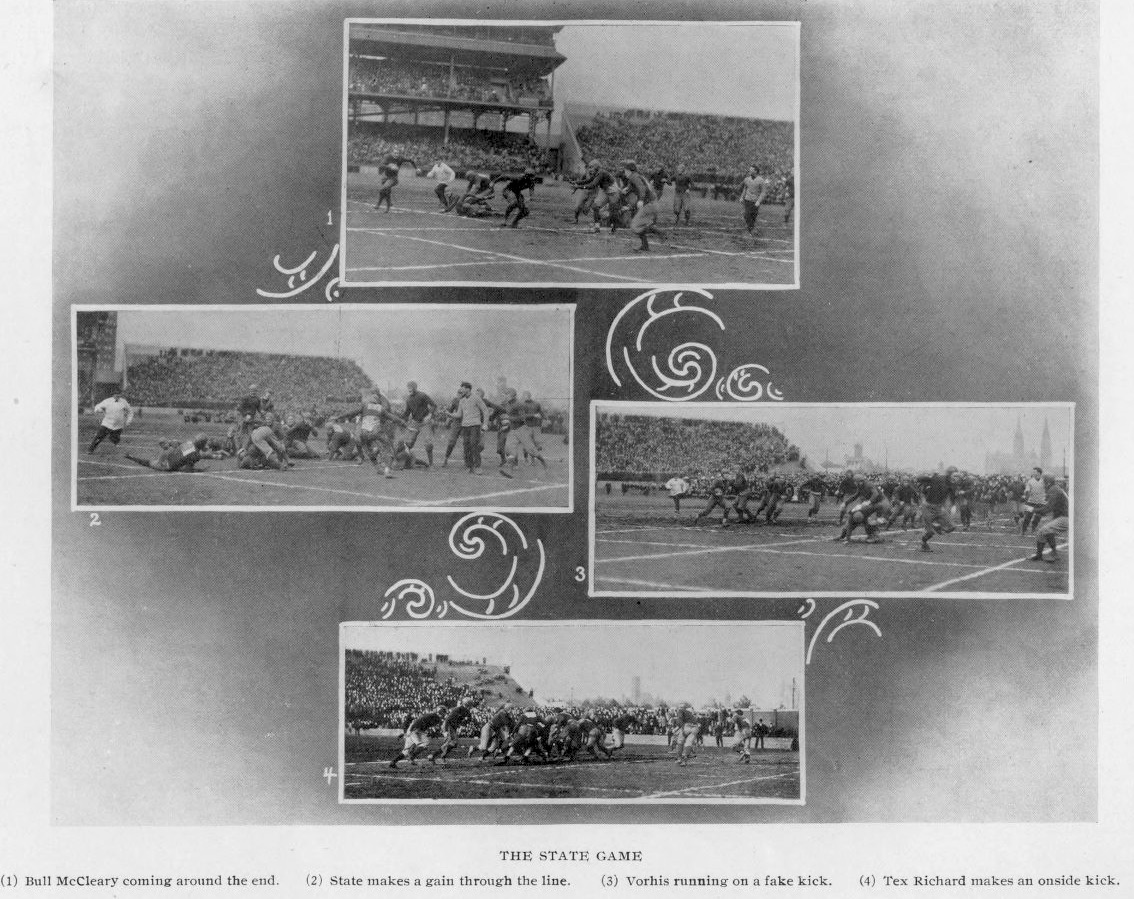
Collage of photos from the 1909 Pitt versus Penn State game

Fifteen thousand fanatics witnessed the annual Thanksgiving Day football game between the Pennsylvania State College Nittany Lions and University of Pittsburgh. Penn State was unbeaten with four victories and two ties. The winner of this game would be the football champion of Pennsylvania. Both teams were at full strength and the weather was perfect.

Penn State dominated the first half. They totaled eleven first downs and gained 181 yards of offense. Pitt had no first downs and only 22 yards of offense. The Pitt defense struggled to keep the game close. Penn State quarterback Vorhis missed a 19 yard field goal. The Nittanies then lost the ball on downs at the Pitt 15-yard line. On State's next possession they lost the ball on downs on Pitt's 3-yard line. Pitt punted out of trouble, but Penn State advanced the ball to the 7-yard line. State halfback Bull McCleary carried the pigskin into the end zone for the only score of the game. Vorhis missed the point after.

In the second half, the Pitt offense outgained State 60 yards to 54. Pitt had two first downs and State had none. Pitt could not sustain a drive and lost the game 5–0. Penn State finished the season 5–0–2 and won the second leg toward permanent possession of the Spalding Trophy.

The Pitt starting lineup for the game against Penn State was Homer Roe (left end), Frank Van Doren (left tackle), W. Leahy (left guard), Ralph Galvin (center), Red Frankel (right guard), James Stevenson (right tackle), Jack Lindsay (right end), Will Robinson (quarterback), Art Robinson (left halfback), Harry Ent (right halfback), and Tex Richards (fullback). Substitutions made during the game were: Robert Peacock replaced Jack Lindsay at right end; Ross Feightner replaced Harry Ent at right halfback; Henry Blair replaced right guard Red Frankel; Charles Quailey replaced Art Robinson at left halfback; and Tillie Dewar replaced Homer Roe at left end. The game was played in 35-minute halves.

== Scoring summary ==
1909 Pittsburgh Panthers scoring summary
| Player | Touchdowns | Extra points | Field goals | Points |
|---|---|---|---|---|
| Tex Richards | 8 | 0 | 0 | 40 |
| Ralph Galvin | 0 | 9 | 1 | 12 |
| Henry Ent | 2 | 0 | 0 | 10 |
| Norman Budd | 1 | 1 | 0 | 6 |
| Bill Robinson | 1 | 0 | 0 | 5 |
| Homer Roe | 1 | 0 | 0 | 5 |
| Ross Feightner | 1 | 0 | 0 | 5 |
| Dave Richards | 1 | 0 | 0 | 5 |
| Charles Quailey | 1 | 0 | 0 | 5 |
| Frank Van Doren | 0 | 1 | 0 | 1 |
| Totals | 16 | 11 | 1 | 94 |
