= 1909 Boston College football team =

American college football season

1909 Boston College football
- Conference: Independent
- Record: 3–4–1
- Head coach: Thomas H. Maguire (1st season)
- Captain: George Pearce

1909 Eastern college football independents records
	Conf.			Overall
Team	W	L	T	W		L		T
Yale		–		10	–	0	–	0
Lafayette		–		7	–	0	–	1
Franklin & Marshall		–		9	–	1	–	0
Harvard		–		9	–	1	–	0
Penn State		–		5	–	0	–	2
Washington & Jefferson		–		8	–	1	–	1
Springfield Training School		–		5	–	1	–	0
NYU		–		6	–	1	–	1
Ursinus		–		6	–	1	–	1
Penn		–		7	–	1	–	2
Trinity (CT)		–		6	–	1	–	2
Dartmouth		–		5	–	1	–	2
Fordham		–		5	–	1	–	2
Princeton		–		6	–	2	–	1
Pittsburgh		–		6	–	2	–	1
Carlisle		–		8	–	3	–	1
Colgate		–		5	–	2	–	1
Brown		–		7	–	3	–	1
Geneva		–		4	–	2	–	0
Carnegie Tech		–		5	–	3	–	1
Vermont		–		4	–	2	–	2
Lehigh		–		4	–	3	–	2
Army		–		3	–	2	–	0
Villanova		–		3	–	2	–	0
Dickinson		–		4	–	4	–	1
Syracuse		–		4	–	5	–	1
Bucknell		–		3	–	4	–	2
Boston College		–		3	–	4	–	1
Cornell		–		3	–	4	–	1
New Hampshire		–		3	–	4	–	0
Rhode Island State		–		3	–	4	–	0
Rutgers		–		3	–	5	–	1
Wesleyan		–		3	–	5	–	1
Holy Cross		–		2	–	4	–	2
Swarthmore		–		2	–	5	–	0
Drexel		–		1	–	5	–	3
Tufts		–		2	–	6	–	0
Amherst		–		1	–	6	–	1
Temple		–		0	–	4	–	1

The 1909 Boston College football team was an American football team that represented Boston College as an independent during the 1909 college football season. Led by Thomas H. Maguire in his first and only season as head coach, Boston College compiled a record of 3–4–1.

== Schedule ==
Date	Opponent	Site	Result	Source
October 9	St. Alphonsus	Massachusetts Avenue Grounds	L 0–6	
October 13	at Phillips Academy	Andover, MA	L 0–10	
October 16	at Rhode Island State	Kingston, RI	L 0–9	
October 20	College of Osteopathy	Boston College athletic grounds; Chestnut Hill, MA	W 35–0	
October 23	at New Hampshire	Durham, NH	L 6–11	
October 30	Saint Anselm	Massachusetts Avenue Grounds	T 6–6	
November 13	at Connecticut	Athletic Fields; Storrs, CT	W 17–0	
November 25	at Saint Anselm	Varick Park; Manchester, NH	W 7–0	
