= 1909 Colgate football team =

American college football season

1909 Colgate football
- Conference: Independent
- Record: 5–2–1
- Head coach: R. M. Brown (1st season)
- Captain: E. T. MacDonnell
- Home stadium: Whitnall Field

1909 Eastern college football independents records
	Conf.			Overall
Team	W	L	T	W		L		T
Yale		–		10	–	0	–	0
Lafayette		–		7	–	0	–	1
Franklin & Marshall		–		9	–	1	–	0
Harvard		–		9	–	1	–	0
Penn State		–		5	–	0	–	2
Washington & Jefferson		–		8	–	1	–	1
Springfield Training School		–		5	–	1	–	0
NYU		–		6	–	1	–	1
Ursinus		–		6	–	1	–	1
Penn		–		7	–	1	–	2
Trinity (CT)		–		6	–	1	–	2
Dartmouth		–		5	–	1	–	2
Fordham		–		5	–	1	–	2
Princeton		–		6	–	2	–	1
Pittsburgh		–		6	–	2	–	1
Carlisle		–		8	–	3	–	1
Colgate		–		5	–	2	–	1
Brown		–		7	–	3	–	1
Geneva		–		4	–	2	–	0
Carnegie Tech		–		5	–	3	–	1
Vermont		–		4	–	2	–	2
Lehigh		–		4	–	3	–	2
Army		–		3	–	2	–	0
Villanova		–		3	–	2	–	0
Dickinson		–		4	–	4	–	1
Syracuse		–		4	–	5	–	1
Bucknell		–		3	–	4	–	2
Boston College		–		3	–	4	–	1
Cornell		–		3	–	4	–	1
New Hampshire		–		3	–	4	–	0
Rhode Island State		–		3	–	4	–	0
Rutgers		–		3	–	5	–	1
Wesleyan		–		3	–	5	–	1
Holy Cross		–		2	–	4	–	2
Swarthmore		–		2	–	5	–	0
Drexel		–		1	–	5	–	3
Tufts		–		2	–	6	–	0
Amherst		–		1	–	6	–	1
Temple		–		0	–	4	–	1

The 1909 Colgate football team was an American football team that represented Colgate University as an independent during the 1909 college football season. In its first and only season under head coach R. M. Brown, the team compiled a 5–2–1 record. E. T. MacDonnell was the team captain. The team played its home games on Whitnall Field in Hamilton, New York.

== Schedule ==
Date	Time	Opponent	Site	Result	Attendance	Source
October 2		at Brown	Andrews Field; Providence, RI	L 0–14		
October 9		Hamilton	Whitnall Field; Hamilton, NY	W 48–0		
October 16		St. Lawrence	Whitnall Field; Hamilton, NY	W 58–0		
October 23		at Yale	Yale Field; New Haven, CT	L 0–36		
October 30		Trinity (CT)	Whitnall Field; Hamilton, NY	T 0–0		
November 6		at Rochester	Rochester, NY	W 21–0		
November 13	2:10 p.m.	at Syracuse	Archbold Stadium; Syracuse, NY (rivalry)	W 6–5	15,000	
November 25	3:00 p.m.	at Carnegie Tech	Leeds Field; Pittsburgh, PA	W 38–6		
