= 1909 Bucknell football team =

American college football season

1909 Bucknell football
- Conference: Independent
- Record: 3–4–2
- Head coach: George W. Hoskins (9th season)
- Captain: Harry Coulson

1909 Eastern college football independents records
	Conf.			Overall
Team	W	L	T	W		L		T
Yale		–		10	–	0	–	0
Lafayette		–		7	–	0	–	1
Franklin & Marshall		–		9	–	1	–	0
Harvard		–		9	–	1	–	0
Penn State		–		5	–	0	–	2
Washington & Jefferson		–		8	–	1	–	1
Springfield Training School		–		5	–	1	–	0
NYU		–		6	–	1	–	1
Ursinus		–		6	–	1	–	1
Penn		–		7	–	1	–	2
Trinity (CT)		–		6	–	1	–	2
Dartmouth		–		5	–	1	–	2
Fordham		–		5	–	1	–	2
Princeton		–		6	–	2	–	1
Pittsburgh		–		6	–	2	–	1
Carlisle		–		8	–	3	–	1
Colgate		–		5	–	2	–	1
Brown		–		7	–	3	–	1
Geneva		–		4	–	2	–	0
Carnegie Tech		–		5	–	3	–	1
Vermont		–		4	–	2	–	2
Lehigh		–		4	–	3	–	2
Army		–		3	–	2	–	0
Villanova		–		3	–	2	–	0
Dickinson		–		4	–	4	–	1
Syracuse		–		4	–	5	–	1
Bucknell		–		3	–	4	–	2
Boston College		–		3	–	4	–	1
Cornell		–		3	–	4	–	1
New Hampshire		–		3	–	4	–	0
Rhode Island State		–		3	–	4	–	0
Rutgers		–		3	–	5	–	1
Wesleyan		–		3	–	5	–	1
Holy Cross		–		2	–	4	–	2
Swarthmore		–		2	–	5	–	0
Drexel		–		1	–	5	–	3
Tufts		–		2	–	6	–	0
Amherst		–		1	–	6	–	1
Temple		–		0	–	4	–	1

The 1909 Bucknell football team was an American football team that represented Bucknell University as an independent during the 1909 college football season. Led by head coach George W. Hoskins in his ninth and final season as head coach, the team compiled a 3–4–2

== Schedule ==
Date	Time	Opponent	Site	Result	Attendance	Source
September 25		Susquehanna	Lewisburg, PA	W 14–5		
October 2		at Carlisle	Indian Field; Carlisle, PA	L 6–48		
October 9		at Gettysburg	Gettysburg, PA	W 9–3		
October 16		at Pittsburgh	Forbes Field; Pittsburgh, PA	L 6–18		
October 23		at West Virginia	Morgantown, WV	T 6–6		
November 6		Penn State	Lewisburg, PA	L 0–33	7,000	
November 13		Dickinson	Lewisburg, PA	T 6–6		
November 20		at Swartmore	Whittier Field; Swarthmore, PA	L 0–29		
November 25		at George Washington	American League Park; Washington, DC	W 12–6		
