= 1909 Massachusetts Aggies football team =

American college football season

1909 Massachusetts Aggies football
- Conference: Athletic League of New England State Colleges
- Record: 1–6–2 ( Athletic League of New England State Colleges)
- Head coach: J. W. Gage (1st season)
- Home stadium: Alumni Field

The 1909 Massachusetts Aggies football team represented Massachusetts Agricultural College in the 1909 college football season. The team was coached by J. W. Gage and played its home games at Alumni Field in Amherst, Massachusetts. The 1909 season was Gage's only as head coach of the Aggies. Massachusetts finished the season with a record of 1–6–2.

== Schedule ==
Date	Opponent	Site	Result	Source
September 25	Maine	Alumni Field; Amherst, MA	T 0–0	
September 29	at Dartmouth	Alumni Oval; Hanover, NH	L 0–22	
October 2	at Union (NY)	Schenectady, NY	T 6–6	
October 9	Norwich	Alumni Field; Amherst, MA	W 6–0	
October 16	Worcester Tech	Alumni Field; Amherst, MA	L 0–2	
October 23	at Williams	Weston Field; Williamstown, MA	L 6–33	
October 30	at Brown	Andrews Field; Providence, RI	L 3–12	
November 6	at New Hampshire	Manchester, NH (rivalry)	L 0–17	
November 13	at Springfield Training School	Springfield, MA	L 6–18	
