= 1909 Washington & Jefferson Red and Black football team =

American college football season

1909 Washington & Jefferson Red and Black football
- Conference: Independent
- Record: 8–1–1
- Head coach: David C. Morrow (2nd season)
- Home stadium: College Park

1909 Eastern college football independents records
	Conf.			Overall
Team	W	L	T	W		L		T
Yale		–		10	–	0	–	0
Lafayette		–		7	–	0	–	1
Franklin & Marshall		–		9	–	1	–	0
Harvard		–		9	–	1	–	0
Penn State		–		5	–	0	–	2
Washington & Jefferson		–		8	–	1	–	1
Springfield Training School		–		5	–	1	–	0
NYU		–		6	–	1	–	1
Ursinus		–		6	–	1	–	1
Penn		–		7	–	1	–	2
Trinity (CT)		–		6	–	1	–	2
Dartmouth		–		5	–	1	–	2
Fordham		–		5	–	1	–	2
Princeton		–		6	–	2	–	1
Pittsburgh		–		6	–	2	–	1
Carlisle		–		8	–	3	–	1
Colgate		–		5	–	2	–	1
Brown		–		7	–	3	–	1
Geneva		–		4	–	2	–	0
Carnegie Tech		–		5	–	3	–	1
Vermont		–		4	–	2	–	2
Lehigh		–		4	–	3	–	2
Army		–		3	–	2	–	0
Villanova		–		3	–	2	–	0
Dickinson		–		4	–	4	–	1
Syracuse		–		4	–	5	–	1
Bucknell		–		3	–	4	–	2
Boston College		–		3	–	4	–	1
Cornell		–		3	–	4	–	1
New Hampshire		–		3	–	4	–	0
Rhode Island State		–		3	–	4	–	0
Rutgers		–		3	–	5	–	1
Wesleyan		–		3	–	5	–	1
Holy Cross		–		2	–	4	–	2
Swarthmore		–		2	–	5	–	0
Drexel		–		1	–	5	–	3
Tufts		–		2	–	6	–	0
Amherst		–		1	–	6	–	1
Temple		–		0	–	4	–	1

The 1909 Washington & Jefferson Red and Black football team represented Washington & Jefferson College as an independent during the 1909 college football season. Led by second-year head David C. Morrow, Washington & Jefferson compiled a record of 8–1–1.

== Schedule ==
Date	Opponent	Site	Result	Attendance	Source
September 25	Denison	Washington, PA	W 15–2		
October 2	Geneva	College Park; Washington, PA	W 37–0		
October 9	Bethany (WV)	College Park; Washington, PA	W 5–0		
October 16	Dickinson	College Park; Washington, PA	W 18–3		
October 23	Westminster (PA)	Washington, PA	W 6–0		
October 27	Indiana Normal (PA)	Washington, PA	W 74–8		
October 30	Waynesburg	Washington, PA	W 46–0		
November 6	at Navy	Worden Field; Annapolis, MD	T 0–0		
November 13	at Pittsburgh	Forbes Field; Pittsburgh, PA	L 3–17	12,000	
November 25	at West Virginia	Morgantown, WV	W 18–5	6,000	
