= 1909 Swarthmore Quakers football team =

American college football season

1909 Swarthmore Quakers football
- Conference: Independent
- Record: 2–5
- Head coach: George H. Brooke (10th season)
- Home stadium: Whittier Field

1909 Eastern college football independents records
	Conf.			Overall
Team	W	L	T	W		L		T
Yale		–		10	–	0	–	0
Lafayette		–		7	–	0	–	1
Franklin & Marshall		–		9	–	1	–	0
Harvard		–		9	–	1	–	0
Penn State		–		5	–	0	–	2
Washington & Jefferson		–		8	–	1	–	1
Springfield Training School		–		5	–	1	–	0
NYU		–		6	–	1	–	1
Ursinus		–		6	–	1	–	1
Penn		–		7	–	1	–	2
Trinity (CT)		–		6	–	1	–	2
Dartmouth		–		5	–	1	–	2
Fordham		–		5	–	1	–	2
Princeton		–		6	–	2	–	1
Pittsburgh		–		6	–	2	–	1
Carlisle		–		8	–	3	–	1
Colgate		–		5	–	2	–	1
Brown		–		7	–	3	–	1
Geneva		–		4	–	2	–	0
Carnegie Tech		–		5	–	3	–	1
Vermont		–		4	–	2	–	2
Lehigh		–		4	–	3	–	2
Army		–		3	–	2	–	0
Villanova		–		3	–	2	–	0
Dickinson		–		4	–	4	–	1
Syracuse		–		4	–	5	–	1
Bucknell		–		3	–	4	–	2
Boston College		–		3	–	4	–	1
Cornell		–		3	–	4	–	1
New Hampshire		–		3	–	4	–	0
Rhode Island State		–		3	–	4	–	0
Rutgers		–		3	–	5	–	1
Wesleyan		–		3	–	5	–	1
Holy Cross		–		2	–	4	–	2
Swarthmore		–		2	–	5	–	0
Drexel		–		1	–	5	–	3
Tufts		–		2	–	6	–	0
Amherst		–		1	–	6	–	1
Temple		–		0	–	4	–	1

The 1909 Swarthmore Quakers football team was an American football team that represented Swarthmore College as an independent during the 1909 college football season. The team compiled a 2–5 record and was outscored by a total of 101 to 84. George H. Brooke was the head coach.

== Schedule ==
Date	Opponent	Site	Result	Source
October 9	Franklin & Marshall	Whittier Field; Swarthmore, PA	L 0–5	
October 16	at Lafayette	March Field; Easton, PA	L 0–22	
October 23	at Fordham	American League Park; New York, NY	L 3–31	
October 30	Delaware	Whittier Field; Swarthmore, PA	W 46–0	
November 6	Villanova	Whittier Field; Swarthmore, PA	L 0–19	
November 13	at Ursinus	Collegeville, PA	L 6–34	
November 20	Bucknell	Whittier Field; Swarthmore, PA	W 29–0	
