= 1909 Villanova Wildcats football team =

American college football season

1909 Villanova Wildcats football
- Conference: Independent
- Record: 3–2
- Head coach: Fred Crolius (6th season)
- Captain: Joseph Curley

1909 Eastern college football independents records
	Conf.			Overall
Team	W	L	T	W		L		T
Yale		–		10	–	0	–	0
Lafayette		–		7	–	0	–	1
Franklin & Marshall		–		9	–	1	–	0
Harvard		–		9	–	1	–	0
Penn State		–		5	–	0	–	2
Washington & Jefferson		–		8	–	1	–	1
Springfield Training School		–		5	–	1	–	0
NYU		–		6	–	1	–	1
Ursinus		–		6	–	1	–	1
Penn		–		7	–	1	–	2
Trinity (CT)		–		6	–	1	–	2
Dartmouth		–		5	–	1	–	2
Fordham		–		5	–	1	–	2
Princeton		–		6	–	2	–	1
Pittsburgh		–		6	–	2	–	1
Carlisle		–		8	–	3	–	1
Colgate		–		5	–	2	–	1
Brown		–		7	–	3	–	1
Geneva		–		4	–	2	–	0
Carnegie Tech		–		5	–	3	–	1
Vermont		–		4	–	2	–	2
Lehigh		–		4	–	3	–	2
Army		–		3	–	2	–	0
Villanova		–		3	–	2	–	0
Dickinson		–		4	–	4	–	1
Syracuse		–		4	–	5	–	1
Bucknell		–		3	–	4	–	2
Boston College		–		3	–	4	–	1
Cornell		–		3	–	4	–	1
New Hampshire		–		3	–	4	–	0
Rhode Island State		–		3	–	4	–	0
Rutgers		–		3	–	5	–	1
Wesleyan		–		3	–	5	–	1
Holy Cross		–		2	–	4	–	2
Swarthmore		–		2	–	5	–	0
Drexel		–		1	–	5	–	3
Tufts		–		2	–	6	–	0
Amherst		–		1	–	6	–	1
Temple		–		0	–	4	–	1

The 1909 Villanova Wildcats football team represented the Villanova University during the 1909 college football season. Led by sixth-year head coach Fred Crolius, Villanova compiled a record of 3–2. The team's captain was Joseph Curley.

== Schedule ==
Date	Opponent	Site	Result
September 25	at Carlisle	Indian Field; Carlisle, PA	L 0–9
October 2	Princeton	University Field; Princeton, NJ	L 0–12
October 16	at Navy	Worden Field; Annapolis, MD	W 11–6
October 23	at Mount St. Mary's	Emmitsburg, MD	W 50–0
November 6	at Swarthmore	Whittier Field; Swarthmore, PA	W 19–0
