= 1909 Army Cadets football team =

American college football season

1909 Army Cadets football
- Conference: Independent
- Record: 3–2
- Head coach: Harry Nelly (2nd season)
- Captain: Daniel Pullen
- Home stadium: The Plain

1909 Eastern college football independents records
	Conf.			Overall
Team	W	L	T	W		L		T
Yale		–		10	–	0	–	0
Lafayette		–		7	–	0	–	1
Franklin & Marshall		–		9	–	1	–	0
Harvard		–		9	–	1	–	0
Penn State		–		5	–	0	–	2
Washington & Jefferson		–		8	–	1	–	1
Springfield Training School		–		5	–	1	–	0
NYU		–		6	–	1	–	1
Ursinus		–		6	–	1	–	1
Penn		–		7	–	1	–	2
Trinity (CT)		–		6	–	1	–	2
Dartmouth		–		5	–	1	–	2
Fordham		–		5	–	1	–	2
Princeton		–		6	–	2	–	1
Pittsburgh		–		6	–	2	–	1
Carlisle		–		8	–	3	–	1
Colgate		–		5	–	2	–	1
Brown		–		7	–	3	–	1
Geneva		–		4	–	2	–	0
Carnegie Tech		–		5	–	3	–	1
Vermont		–		4	–	2	–	2
Lehigh		–		4	–	3	–	2
Army		–		3	–	2	–	0
Villanova		–		3	–	2	–	0
Dickinson		–		4	–	4	–	1
Syracuse		–		4	–	5	–	1
Bucknell		–		3	–	4	–	2
Boston College		–		3	–	4	–	1
Cornell		–		3	–	4	–	1
New Hampshire		–		3	–	4	–	0
Rhode Island State		–		3	–	4	–	0
Rutgers		–		3	–	5	–	1
Wesleyan		–		3	–	5	–	1
Holy Cross		–		2	–	4	–	2
Swarthmore		–		2	–	5	–	0
Drexel		–		1	–	5	–	3
Tufts		–		2	–	6	–	0
Amherst		–		1	–	6	–	1
Temple		–		0	–	4	–	1

The 1909 Army Cadets football team represented the United States Military Academy as an independent during the 1909 college football season. In their second season under head coach Harry Nelly, the Cadets compiled a 3–2 record, shut out two of their five opponents, and outscored all opponents by a combined total of 57 to 32. The team's two losses were to Yale and Harvard; the Army–Navy Game was not played in 1909.

Tackle Daniel Pullen was selected by The New York Times as a second-team player on its All-America team.

== Schedule ==
Date	Opponent	Site	Result	Source
October 2	Tufts	The Plain; West Point, NY	W 22–0	
October 9	Trinity (CT)	The Plain; West Point, NY	W 17–6	
October 16	Yale	The Plain; West Point, NY	L 0–17	
October 23	Lehigh	The Plain; West Point, NY	W 18–0	
October 30	Harvard	The Plain; West Point, NY	L 0–9	
November 6	Springfield Training School	The Plain; West Point, NY	Cancelled	
