= Thomas H. Maguire =

American football coach and physician

Biographical details
- Born: January 11, 1877; Boston, Massachusetts, U.S.
- Died: March 5, 1915 (aged 38); Boston, Massachusetts, U.S.

Coaching career (HC unless noted)
- 1901–1906: Boston Latin (MA)
- 1909: Boston College

Head coaching record
- Overall: 3–4–1 (college)

Thomas H. Maguire (January 11, 1877 – March 5, 1915) was an American football coach and physician. He served as the head football coach at Boston College for one season, in 1909, compiling a record of 3–4–1.

== Early life ==
Maguire was born on January 11, 1877, in South Boston to Daniel F. and Susan F. Maguire. He attended Boston Latin School and was a member of the school's football team. He played quarterback in 1893 and running back in 1894 and 1895. He was also the team's punter. In 1895 he was the team captain.

After graduating from Boston Latin, Maguire attended Harvard College and Harvard Medical School.

== Medical career ==
Shortly after graduating from medical school, Maguire began his own practice in Dorchester. He was also a member of the staff at Carney Hospital.

== Coaching career ==
Maguire coached football at Boston Latin from 1901 to 1906. On September 27, 1909, the Boston College Athletic Association announced that Maguire would be the school's football coach. B.C. went 3–4–1 that season.

== Personal life and death ==
In October 1910, Maguire married Margaret G. Henry of Dorchester.

In February 1915, Maguire developed pneumonia. He died one week later at his home in Dorchester. He was survived by his wife and one daughter, Marguerite.

== Head coaching record ==
Year	Team	Overall	Conference	Standing	Bowl/playoffs
Boston College (Independent) (1909)
1909	Boston College	3–4–1			
Boston College:		3–4–1			
Total:		3–4–1			
