= 1909 Cornell Big Red football team =

American college football season

1909 Cornell Big Red football
- Conference: Independent
- Record: 3–4–1
- Head coach: George Walder (1st season)
- Captain: A. F. Tydeman
- Home stadium: Percy Field

1909 Eastern college football independents records
	Conf.			Overall
Team	W	L	T	W		L		T
Yale		–		10	–	0	–	0
Lafayette		–		7	–	0	–	1
Franklin & Marshall		–		9	–	1	–	0
Harvard		–		9	–	1	–	0
Penn State		–		5	–	0	–	2
Washington & Jefferson		–		8	–	1	–	1
Springfield Training School		–		5	–	1	–	0
NYU		–		6	–	1	–	1
Ursinus		–		6	–	1	–	1
Penn		–		7	–	1	–	2
Trinity (CT)		–		6	–	1	–	2
Dartmouth		–		5	–	1	–	2
Fordham		–		5	–	1	–	2
Princeton		–		6	–	2	–	1
Pittsburgh		–		6	–	2	–	1
Carlisle		–		8	–	3	–	1
Colgate		–		5	–	2	–	1
Brown		–		7	–	3	–	1
Geneva		–		4	–	2	–	0
Carnegie Tech		–		5	–	3	–	1
Vermont		–		4	–	2	–	2
Lehigh		–		4	–	3	–	2
Army		–		3	–	2	–	0
Villanova		–		3	–	2	–	0
Dickinson		–		4	–	4	–	1
Syracuse		–		4	–	5	–	1
Bucknell		–		3	–	4	–	2
Boston College		–		3	–	4	–	1
Cornell		–		3	–	4	–	1
New Hampshire		–		3	–	4	–	0
Rhode Island State		–		3	–	4	–	0
Rutgers		–		3	–	5	–	1
Wesleyan		–		3	–	5	–	1
Holy Cross		–		2	–	4	–	2
Swarthmore		–		2	–	5	–	0
Drexel		–		1	–	5	–	3
Tufts		–		2	–	6	–	0
Amherst		–		1	–	6	–	1
Temple		–		0	–	4	–	1

The 1909 Cornell Big Red football team was an American football team that represented Cornell University during the 1909 college football season. In their first season under head coach George Walder, the Big Red compiled a 3–4–1 record and outscored all opponents by a combined total of 66 to 65.

== Schedule ==
Date	Opponent	Site	Result	Attendance	Source
October 2	RPI	Percy Field; Ithaca, NY	W 16–3		
October 9	Oberlin	Percy Field; Ithaca, NY	W 16–6		
October 16	Fordham	Percy Field; Ithaca, NY	L 6–12		
October 23	Vermont	Percy Field; Ithaca, NY	W 16–0		
October 30	Williams	Percy Field; Ithaca, NY	L 0–3		
November 6	at Harvard	Harvard Stadium; Boston, MA	L 0–18		
November 13	Chicago	Percy Field; Ithaca, NY	T 6–6		
November 25	at Penn	Franklin Field; Philadelphia, PA (rivalry)	L 6–17	20,000	
