= 1909 Syracuse Orangemen football team =

American college football season

1909 Syracuse Orangemen football
- Conference: Independent
- Record: 4–5–1
- Head coach: Tad Jones (1st season)
- Captain: Herbert Barry
- Home stadium: Archbold Stadium

1909 Eastern college football independents records
	Conf.			Overall
Team	W	L	T	W		L		T
Yale		–		10	–	0	–	0
Lafayette		–		7	–	0	–	1
Franklin & Marshall		–		9	–	1	–	0
Harvard		–		9	–	1	–	0
Penn State		–		5	–	0	–	2
Washington & Jefferson		–		8	–	1	–	1
Springfield Training School		–		5	–	1	–	0
NYU		–		6	–	1	–	1
Ursinus		–		6	–	1	–	1
Penn		–		7	–	1	–	2
Trinity (CT)		–		6	–	1	–	2
Dartmouth		–		5	–	1	–	2
Fordham		–		5	–	1	–	2
Princeton		–		6	–	2	–	1
Pittsburgh		–		6	–	2	–	1
Carlisle		–		8	–	3	–	1
Colgate		–		5	–	2	–	1
Brown		–		7	–	3	–	1
Geneva		–		4	–	2	–	0
Carnegie Tech		–		5	–	3	–	1
Vermont		–		4	–	2	–	2
Lehigh		–		4	–	3	–	2
Army		–		3	–	2	–	0
Villanova		–		3	–	2	–	0
Dickinson		–		4	–	4	–	1
Syracuse		–		4	–	5	–	1
Bucknell		–		3	–	4	–	2
Boston College		–		3	–	4	–	1
Cornell		–		3	–	4	–	1
New Hampshire		–		3	–	4	–	0
Rhode Island State		–		3	–	4	–	0
Rutgers		–		3	–	5	–	1
Wesleyan		–		3	–	5	–	1
Holy Cross		–		2	–	4	–	2
Swarthmore		–		2	–	5	–	0
Drexel		–		1	–	5	–	3
Tufts		–		2	–	6	–	0
Amherst		–		1	–	6	–	1
Temple		–		0	–	4	–	1

The 1909 Syracuse Orangemen football team represented Syracuse University as an independent during the 1909 college football season. Led by first-year head coach Tad Jones, the Orangemen compiled a record of 4–5–1. The team played home games at Archbold Stadium in Syracuse, New York.

== Schedule ==
Date	Time	Opponent	Site	Result	Attendance	Source
September 25		Hamilton	Archbold Stadium; Syracuse, NY	W 20–0		
October 2		at Yale	Yale Field; New Haven, CT	L 0–15		
October 9	2:30 p.m.	Rochester	Archbold Stadium; Syracuse, NY	W 17–0	6,000	
October 16	2:45 p.m.	vs. Carlisle	Polo Grounds; New York, NY	L 11–14	2,500	
October 23	2:45 p.m.	Niagara	Archbold Stadium; Syracuse, NY	W 39–0	4,000	
October 30	2:30 p.m.	at Michigan	Ferry Field; Ann Arbor, MI	L 0–44 (Note: There is a discrepancy in contemporaneous reports as to whether Michigan scored 43 or 44 points against Syracuse, the difference being whether Dave Allerdice converted five or six of his extra point attempts. The Chicago Daily Tribune reported on the day after the game that Allerdice had missed two extra point attempts. While accounts differ, the University of Michigan records the final score as 44–0. According to the Bentley Historical Library, the initial report from The Michigan Daily gave the result as 43–0, but the Daily corrected the score several days later to 44–0. Further, the Michigan athletic department's own "Dope Books", the official listing of results and letterwinners, records the score as 44–0.)	7,500	
November 6	2:30 p.m.	Tufts	Archbold Stadium; Syracuse, NY	L 0-5		
November 13	2:10 p.m.	Colgate	Archbold Stadium; Syracuse, NY (rivalry)	L 5–6	15,000	
November 20	2:15 p.m.	Illinois	Archbold Stadium; Syracuse, NY	L 8–17	7,000	
November 25		at Fordham	American League Park; New York, NY	T 5–5	500	
