= 1909 Geneva Covenanters football team =

American college football season

1909 Geneva Covenanters football
- Conference: Independent
- Record: 4–2
- Head coach: Arthur McKean (3rd season)

1909 Eastern college football independents records
| | Conf. | | | Overall |
| Team | W | L | T | W | | L | | T |
|---|---|---|---|---|---|---|---|---|
| Yale | | – | | 10 | – | 0 | – | 0 |
| Lafayette | | – | | 7 | – | 0 | – | 1 |
| Franklin & Marshall | | – | | 9 | – | 1 | – | 0 |
| Harvard | | – | | 9 | – | 1 | – | 0 |
| Penn State | | – | | 5 | – | 0 | – | 2 |
| Washington & Jefferson | | – | | 8 | – | 1 | – | 1 |
| Springfield Training School | | – | | 5 | – | 1 | – | 0 |
| NYU | | – | | 6 | – | 1 | – | 1 |
| Ursinus | | – | | 6 | – | 1 | – | 1 |
| Penn | | – | | 7 | – | 1 | – | 2 |
| Trinity (CT) | | – | | 6 | – | 1 | – | 2 |
| Dartmouth | | – | | 5 | – | 1 | – | 2 |
| Fordham | | – | | 5 | – | 1 | – | 2 |
| Princeton | | – | | 6 | – | 2 | – | 1 |
| Pittsburgh | | – | | 6 | – | 2 | – | 1 |
| Carlisle | | – | | 8 | – | 3 | – | 1 |
| Colgate | | – | | 5 | – | 2 | – | 1 |
| Brown | | – | | 7 | – | 3 | – | 1 |
| Geneva | | – | | 4 | – | 2 | – | 0 |
| Carnegie Tech | | – | | 5 | – | 3 | – | 1 |
| Vermont | | – | | 4 | – | 2 | – | 2 |
| Lehigh | | – | | 4 | – | 3 | – | 2 |
| Army | | – | | 3 | – | 2 | – | 0 |
| Villanova | | – | | 3 | – | 2 | – | 0 |
| Dickinson | | – | | 4 | – | 4 | – | 1 |
| Syracuse | | – | | 4 | – | 5 | – | 1 |
| Bucknell | | – | | 3 | – | 4 | – | 2 |
| Boston College | | – | | 3 | – | 4 | – | 1 |
| Cornell | | – | | 3 | – | 4 | – | 1 |
| New Hampshire | | – | | 3 | – | 4 | – | 0 |
| Rhode Island State | | – | | 3 | – | 4 | – | 0 |
| Rutgers | | – | | 3 | – | 5 | – | 1 |
| Wesleyan | | – | | 3 | – | 5 | – | 1 |
| Holy Cross | | – | | 2 | – | 4 | – | 2 |
| Swarthmore | | – | | 2 | – | 5 | – | 0 |
| Drexel | | – | | 1 | – | 5 | – | 3 |
| Tufts | | – | | 2 | – | 6 | – | 0 |
| Amherst | | – | | 1 | – | 6 | – | 1 |
| Temple | | – | | 0 | – | 4 | – | 1 |

The 1909 Geneva Covenanters football team was an American football team that represented Geneva College as an independent during the 1909 college football season. Led by third-year head coach, Arthur McKean, the team compiled a record of 4–2.

== Schedule ==
| Date | Opponent | Site | Result | Source |
|---|---|---|---|---|
| October 2 | Washington & Jefferson | College Park; Washington, PA | L 0–37 | |
| October 9 | Allegheny | Beaver Falls, PA | W 14–5 | |
| October 16 | at Penn State | New Beaver Field; State College, PA | L 0–46 | |
| October 23 | Bethany (WV) | Beaver Falls, PA | W 3–0 | |
| November 6 | Grove City | Beaver Falls, PA | W 12–3 | |
| November 13 | Westminster (PA) | Beaver Falls, PA | W 6–0 | |
