= Herman Pritchard =

American football player and coach

Biographical details
- Born: October 10, 1883; Hancock County, Indiana, U.S.
- Died: after April 1942

Playing career
- 1907: Swarthmore

Coaching career (HC unless noted)
- 1909: Rutgers

Head coaching record
- Overall: 3–5–1

Herman F. Pritchard (October 10, 1883 – after April 1942) was an American football player and coach. He attended Swarthmore College near Philadelphia, graduating in 1908 with a Master of Arts degree in mathematics. He was the captain of the 1907 Swarthmore football team that compiled a 6–2 record, and the recipient of the Ivy Medal at Swarthmore in 1908. He was the head coach of the Rutgers Scarlet Knights football team in 1909. In one year as a head coach, he compiled a record of 3–5–1. He became a math teacher at Norristown High School, and later served as a teacher and football coach at Barringer High School in Newark, New Jersey. In April 1942, he was living in Millburn, New Jersey and was employed by the Newark Board of Education.

== Head coaching record ==
Year	Team	Overall	Conference	Standing	Bowl/playoffs
Rutgers Queensmen (Independent) (1901)
1909	Rutgers	3–5–1			
Rutgers:		3–5–1			
Total:		3–5–1			
