= 1909 Drexel Dragons football team =

American college football season

1909 Drexel Dragons football
- Conference: Independent
- Record: 1–5–3
- Head coach: Corson (1st season)
- Captain: Schittler

1909 Eastern college football independents records
| | Conf. | | | Overall |
| Team | W | L | T | W | | L | | T |
|---|---|---|---|---|---|---|---|---|
| Yale | | – | | 10 | – | 0 | – | 0 |
| Lafayette | | – | | 7 | – | 0 | – | 1 |
| Franklin & Marshall | | – | | 9 | – | 1 | – | 0 |
| Harvard | | – | | 9 | – | 1 | – | 0 |
| Penn State | | – | | 5 | – | 0 | – | 2 |
| Washington & Jefferson | | – | | 8 | – | 1 | – | 1 |
| Springfield Training School | | – | | 5 | – | 1 | – | 0 |
| NYU | | – | | 6 | – | 1 | – | 1 |
| Ursinus | | – | | 6 | – | 1 | – | 1 |
| Penn | | – | | 7 | – | 1 | – | 2 |
| Trinity (CT) | | – | | 6 | – | 1 | – | 2 |
| Dartmouth | | – | | 5 | – | 1 | – | 2 |
| Fordham | | – | | 5 | – | 1 | – | 2 |
| Princeton | | – | | 6 | – | 2 | – | 1 |
| Pittsburgh | | – | | 6 | – | 2 | – | 1 |
| Carlisle | | – | | 8 | – | 3 | – | 1 |
| Colgate | | – | | 5 | – | 2 | – | 1 |
| Brown | | – | | 7 | – | 3 | – | 1 |
| Geneva | | – | | 4 | – | 2 | – | 0 |
| Carnegie Tech | | – | | 5 | – | 3 | – | 1 |
| Vermont | | – | | 4 | – | 2 | – | 2 |
| Lehigh | | – | | 4 | – | 3 | – | 2 |
| Army | | – | | 3 | – | 2 | – | 0 |
| Villanova | | – | | 3 | – | 2 | – | 0 |
| Dickinson | | – | | 4 | – | 4 | – | 1 |
| Syracuse | | – | | 4 | – | 5 | – | 1 |
| Bucknell | | – | | 3 | – | 4 | – | 2 |
| Boston College | | – | | 3 | – | 4 | – | 1 |
| Cornell | | – | | 3 | – | 4 | – | 1 |
| New Hampshire | | – | | 3 | – | 4 | – | 0 |
| Rhode Island State | | – | | 3 | – | 4 | – | 0 |
| Rutgers | | – | | 3 | – | 5 | – | 1 |
| Wesleyan | | – | | 3 | – | 5 | – | 1 |
| Holy Cross | | – | | 2 | – | 4 | – | 2 |
| Swarthmore | | – | | 2 | – | 5 | – | 0 |
| Drexel | | – | | 1 | – | 5 | – | 3 |
| Tufts | | – | | 2 | – | 6 | – | 0 |
| Amherst | | – | | 1 | – | 6 | – | 1 |
| Temple | | – | | 0 | – | 4 | – | 1 |

The 1909 Drexel Dragons football team was coached by Corson.

== Schedule ==
| Date | Opponent | Site | Result |
|---|---|---|---|
| October 23 | at Perkiomen School | Pennsburg, PA | W 5–3 |
| October 27 | at Villanova Prep | Villanova, PA | L 0–11 |
| November 6 | at The Pennington School | Pennington, NJ | L 0–33 |
| November 13 | at Pennsylvania Military | Chester, PA | T 0–0 |
| November 17 | Bryn Athyn | | T 11–11 |
| November 20 | at Williamson College of the Trades | Media, PA | L 5–25 |
| Unknown | Bordentown Military Institute | | L 0–11 |
| Unknown | New Church Academy | | T 0–0 |
| Unknown | Haddonfield High School | | L 0–6 |

== Roster ==
1909 Drexel Dragons football team roster
Players
Coaches
Offense

| Pos. | # | Name | Class |
|---|---|---|---|
| TE | | Schittler (C) |
| OT | | Miller |
| G | | Bayne |
| C | | Gleason |
| G | | Neil |
| OT | | Schmidt |
| TE | | Manney |
| QB | | Haley |
| HB | | Bye |
| HB | | Thomas |
| FB | | Vandemark |
| | | Crossgrove |
| | | Brock |
| | | Gordon |
| | | Chesney |
| | | Ferron |
| | | Soden |
| | | Craig |
| | | Draper |
| | | Warren |
| | | Guerkins |

Defense

| Pos. | # | Name | Class |

Special teams

| Pos. | # | Name | Class |

Head coach

Corson (Penn)

Coordinators/assistant coaches

Legend

- (C) Team captain
- (S) Suspended
- (I) Ineligible
- Injured
- Redshirt
