= 1909 Lafayette football team =

American college football season

1909 Lafayette football
- Conference: Independent
- Record: 7–0–1
- Head coach: Bob Folwell (1st season)
- Captain: Arthur Blaicher
- Home stadium: March Field

1909 Eastern college football independents records
	Conf.			Overall
Team	W	L	T	W		L		T
Yale		–		10	–	0	–	0
Lafayette		–		7	–	0	–	1
Franklin & Marshall		–		9	–	1	–	0
Harvard		–		9	–	1	–	0
Penn State		–		5	–	0	–	2
Washington & Jefferson		–		8	–	1	–	1
Springfield Training School		–		5	–	1	–	0
NYU		–		6	–	1	–	1
Ursinus		–		6	–	1	–	1
Penn		–		7	–	1	–	2
Trinity (CT)		–		6	–	1	–	2
Dartmouth		–		5	–	1	–	2
Fordham		–		5	–	1	–	2
Princeton		–		6	–	2	–	1
Pittsburgh		–		6	–	2	–	1
Carlisle		–		8	–	3	–	1
Colgate		–		5	–	2	–	1
Brown		–		7	–	3	–	1
Geneva		–		4	–	2	–	0
Carnegie Tech		–		5	–	3	–	1
Vermont		–		4	–	2	–	2
Lehigh		–		4	–	3	–	2
Army		–		3	–	2	–	0
Villanova		–		3	–	2	–	0
Dickinson		–		4	–	4	–	1
Syracuse		–		4	–	5	–	1
Bucknell		–		3	–	4	–	2
Boston College		–		3	–	4	–	1
Cornell		–		3	–	4	–	1
New Hampshire		–		3	–	4	–	0
Rhode Island State		–		3	–	4	–	0
Rutgers		–		3	–	5	–	1
Wesleyan		–		3	–	5	–	1
Holy Cross		–		2	–	4	–	2
Swarthmore		–		2	–	5	–	0
Drexel		–		1	–	5	–	3
Tufts		–		2	–	6	–	0
Amherst		–		1	–	6	–	1
Temple		–		0	–	4	–	1

The 1909 Lafayette football team represented Lafayette College in the 1909 college football season. Lafayette shut out seven of its eight opponents and finished with a 7–0–1 record in their first year under head coach Bob Folwell. Significant games included victories over Princeton (6–0) and Lehigh (21–0). The only blemish on the team's record was a 6–6 tie with Penn. The 1909 Lafayette team outscored its opponents by a combined total of 176 to 6. Lafayette fullback George McCaa received recognition on the 1909 College Football All-America Team, as a third-team selection by Walter Camp and a second-team selection by The New York Times.

== Schedule ==
Date	Opponent	Site	Result	Source
October 2	Wyoming Seminary	March Field; Easton, PA	W 23–0	
October 9	Hobart	March Field; Easton, PA	W 50–0	
October 16	Swarthmore	March Field; Easton, PA	W 22–0	
October 23	at Princeton	University Field; Princeton, NJ	W 6–0	
November 6	at Penn	Philadelphia, PA	T 6–6	
November 13	Stroudsburg Normal	March Field; Easton, PA	W 43–0	
November 20	at Lehigh	South Bethlehem, PA (rivalry)	W 5–0	
November 25	Dickinson	March Field; Easton, PA	W 5–0	
