= 1909 Princeton Tigers football team =

American college football season

1909 Princeton Tigers football
- Conference: Independent
- Record: 6–2–1
- Head coach: Jim McCormick (1st season)
- Captain: Rudy Siegling
- Home stadium: University Field

1909 Eastern college football independents records
	Conf.			Overall
Team	W	L	T	W		L		T
Yale		–		10	–	0	–	0
Lafayette		–		7	–	0	–	1
Franklin & Marshall		–		9	–	1	–	0
Harvard		–		9	–	1	–	0
Penn State		–		5	–	0	–	2
Washington & Jefferson		–		8	–	1	–	1
Springfield Training School		–		5	–	1	–	0
NYU		–		6	–	1	–	1
Ursinus		–		6	–	1	–	1
Penn		–		7	–	1	–	2
Trinity (CT)		–		6	–	1	–	2
Dartmouth		–		5	–	1	–	2
Fordham		–		5	–	1	–	2
Princeton		–		6	–	2	–	1
Pittsburgh		–		6	–	2	–	1
Carlisle		–		8	–	3	–	1
Colgate		–		5	–	2	–	1
Brown		–		7	–	3	–	1
Geneva		–		4	–	2	–	0
Carnegie Tech		–		5	–	3	–	1
Vermont		–		4	–	2	–	2
Lehigh		–		4	–	3	–	2
Army		–		3	–	2	–	0
Villanova		–		3	–	2	–	0
Dickinson		–		4	–	4	–	1
Syracuse		–		4	–	5	–	1
Bucknell		–		3	–	4	–	2
Boston College		–		3	–	4	–	1
Cornell		–		3	–	4	–	1
New Hampshire		–		3	–	4	–	0
Rhode Island State		–		3	–	4	–	0
Rutgers		–		3	–	5	–	1
Wesleyan		–		3	–	5	–	1
Holy Cross		–		2	–	4	–	2
Swarthmore		–		2	–	5	–	0
Drexel		–		1	–	5	–	3
Tufts		–		2	–	6	–	0
Amherst		–		1	–	6	–	1
Temple		–		0	–	4	–	1

The 1909 Princeton Tigers football team represented Princeton University in the 1909 college football season. The team finished with a 6–2–1 record under first-year head coach Jim McCormick. No Princeton players were selected as first-team honorees on the 1909 College Football All-America Team.

== Schedule ==
Date	Opponent	Site	Result	Source
September 29	Stevens	University Field; Princeton, NJ	W 47–12	
October 2	Villanova	University Field; Princeton, NJ	W 12–0	
October 9	Fordham	University Field; Princeton, NJ	W 3–0	
October 13	VPI	University Field; Princeton, NJ	W 8–6	
October 16	Sewanee	University Field; Princeton, NJ	W 20–0	
October 23	Lafayette	University Field; Princeton, NJ	L 0–6	
October 30	at Navy	Worden Field; Annapolis, MD	W 5–3	
November 6	Dartmouth	Osborne Field; Princeton, NJ	T 6–6	
November 13	at Yale	Yale Field; New Haven, CT (rivalry)	L 0–17	
