= 1909 Penn Quakers football team =

American college football season

1909 Penn Quakers football
- Conference: Independent
- Record: 7–1–2
- Head coach: Andy Smith (1st season)
- Captain: Allie Miller
- Home stadium: Franklin Field

1909 Eastern college football independents records
	Conf.			Overall
Team	W	L	T	W		L		T
Yale		–		10	–	0	–	0
Lafayette		–		7	–	0	–	1
Franklin & Marshall		–		9	–	1	–	0
Harvard		–		9	–	1	–	0
Penn State		–		5	–	0	–	2
Washington & Jefferson		–		8	–	1	–	1
Springfield Training School		–		5	–	1	–	0
NYU		–		6	–	1	–	1
Ursinus		–		6	–	1	–	1
Penn		–		7	–	1	–	2
Trinity (CT)		–		6	–	1	–	2
Dartmouth		–		5	–	1	–	2
Fordham		–		5	–	1	–	2
Princeton		–		6	–	2	–	1
Pittsburgh		–		6	–	2	–	1
Carlisle		–		8	–	3	–	1
Colgate		–		5	–	2	–	1
Brown		–		7	–	3	–	1
Geneva		–		4	–	2	–	0
Carnegie Tech		–		5	–	3	–	1
Vermont		–		4	–	2	–	2
Lehigh		–		4	–	3	–	2
Army		–		3	–	2	–	0
Villanova		–		3	–	2	–	0
Dickinson		–		4	–	4	–	1
Syracuse		–		4	–	5	–	1
Bucknell		–		3	–	4	–	2
Boston College		–		3	–	4	–	1
Cornell		–		3	–	4	–	1
New Hampshire		–		3	–	4	–	0
Rhode Island State		–		3	–	4	–	0
Rutgers		–		3	–	5	–	1
Wesleyan		–		3	–	5	–	1
Holy Cross		–		2	–	4	–	2
Swarthmore		–		2	–	5	–	0
Drexel		–		1	–	5	–	3
Tufts		–		2	–	6	–	0
Amherst		–		1	–	6	–	1
Temple		–		0	–	4	–	1

The 1909 Penn Quakers football team represented the University of Pennsylvania as an independent during the 1909 college football season. The Quakers finished with a 7–1–2 record in their first year under head coach and College Football Hall of Fame inductee, Andy Smith. Their only loss was to Michigan by a 12 to 6 score, a game that snapped Penn's 23-game winning streak and marked the first time a Western team had defeated one of the "Big Four" (Harvard, Yale, Princeton and Penn). Other significant games included a 12 to 0 victory over West Virginia, a 3-3 tie with Penn State, a 29 to 6 victory over Carlisle, and a 17 to 6 victory over Cornell. They outscored their opponents by a combined total of 146 to 38. End Harry Braddock was the only Penn player to receive All-America honors in 1909, receiving second-team honors from Walter Camp.

== Schedule ==
Date	Opponent	Site	Result	Attendance	Source
September 25	Gettysburg	Franklin Field; Philadelphia, PA	W 20–0		
September 29	Ursinus	Franklin Field; Philadelphia, PA	W 22–0		
October 2	Dickinson	Franklin Field; Philadelphia, PA	W 18–0		
October 9	West Virginia	Franklin Field; Philadelphia, PA	W 12–0		
October 16	Brown	Franklin Field; Philadelphia, PA	W 13–5		
October 23	Penn State	Franklin Field; Philadelphia, PA	T 3–3	12,000	
October 30	Carlisle	Franklin Field; Philadelphia, PA	W 29–6		
November 6	Lafayette	Franklin Field; Philadelphia, PA	T 6–6		
November 13	Michigan	Franklin Field; Philadelphia, PA	L 6–12		
November 25	Cornell	Franklin Field; Philadelphia, PA (rivalry)	W 17–6	20,000	
