= 1909 Penn State Nittany Lions football team =

American college football season

1909 Penn State Nittany Lions football
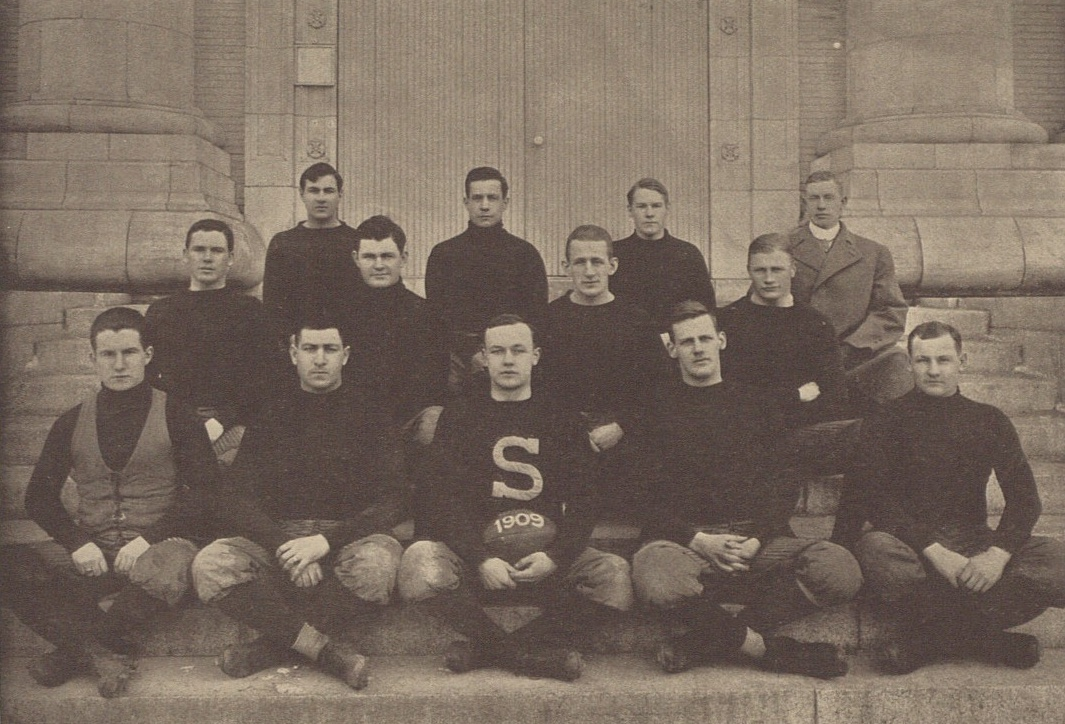
- Conference: Independent
- Record: 5–0–2
- Head coach: Bill Hollenback (1st season)
- Captain: Larry Vorhis
- Home stadium: New Beaver Field

1909 Eastern college football independents records
	Conf.			Overall
Team	W	L	T	W		L		T
Yale		–		10	–	0	–	0
Lafayette		–		7	–	0	–	1
Franklin & Marshall		–		9	–	1	–	0
Harvard		–		9	–	1	–	0
Penn State		–		5	–	0	–	2
Washington & Jefferson		–		8	–	1	–	1
Springfield Training School		–		5	–	1	–	0
NYU		–		6	–	1	–	1
Ursinus		–		6	–	1	–	1
Penn		–		7	–	1	–	2
Trinity (CT)		–		6	–	1	–	2
Dartmouth		–		5	–	1	–	2
Fordham		–		5	–	1	–	2
Princeton		–		6	–	2	–	1
Pittsburgh		–		6	–	2	–	1
Carlisle		–		8	–	3	–	1
Colgate		–		5	–	2	–	1
Brown		–		7	–	3	–	1
Geneva		–		4	–	2	–	0
Carnegie Tech		–		5	–	3	–	1
Vermont		–		4	–	2	–	2
Lehigh		–		4	–	3	–	2
Army		–		3	–	2	–	0
Villanova		–		3	–	2	–	0
Dickinson		–		4	–	4	–	1
Syracuse		–		4	–	5	–	1
Bucknell		–		3	–	4	–	2
Boston College		–		3	–	4	–	1
Cornell		–		3	–	4	–	1
New Hampshire		–		3	–	4	–	0
Rhode Island State		–		3	–	4	–	0
Rutgers		–		3	–	5	–	1
Wesleyan		–		3	–	5	–	1
Holy Cross		–		2	–	4	–	2
Swarthmore		–		2	–	5	–	0
Drexel		–		1	–	5	–	3
Tufts		–		2	–	6	–	0
Amherst		–		1	–	6	–	1
Temple		–		0	–	4	–	1

The 1909 Penn State Nittany Lions football team represented Pennsylvania State College—now known as Pennsylvania State University—as an independent during the 1909 college football season. Led by Bill Hollenback in his first and only season as head coach, the Nittany Lions compiled a record of 5–0–2. The team played home games at New Beaver Field in State College, Pennsylvania.

== Schedule ==
Date	Time	Opponent	Site	Result	Attendance	Source
October 2	3:00 p.m.	Grove City	New Beaver Field; State College, PA	W 31–0		
October 9		vs. Carlisle	Driving Park; Wilkes-Barre, PA	T 8–8	8,000–10,000	
October 16		Geneva	New Beaver Field; State College, PA	W 46–0		
October 23		at Penn	Franklin Field; Philadelphia, PA	T 3–3	12,000	
November 6		at Bucknell	Lewisburg, PA	W 33–0	7,000	
November 13		West Virginia	New Beaver Field; State College, PA (rivalry)	W 40–0		
November 25		at Pittsburgh	Forbes Field; Pittsburgh, PA (rivalry)	W 5–0	15,000	
