= 1909 Ursinus football team =

American college football season

1909 Ursinus football
- Conference: Independent
- Record: 6–1–1
- Head coach: John B. Price (2nd season)

1909 Eastern college football independents records
	Conf.			Overall
Team	W	L	T	W		L		T
Yale		–		10	–	0	–	0
Lafayette		–		7	–	0	–	1
Franklin & Marshall		–		9	–	1	–	0
Harvard		–		9	–	1	–	0
Penn State		–		5	–	0	–	2
Washington & Jefferson		–		8	–	1	–	1
Springfield Training School		–		5	–	1	–	0
NYU		–		6	–	1	–	1
Ursinus		–		6	–	1	–	1
Penn		–		7	–	1	–	2
Trinity (CT)		–		6	–	1	–	2
Dartmouth		–		5	–	1	–	2
Fordham		–		5	–	1	–	2
Princeton		–		6	–	2	–	1
Pittsburgh		–		6	–	2	–	1
Carlisle		–		8	–	3	–	1
Colgate		–		5	–	2	–	1
Brown		–		7	–	3	–	1
Geneva		–		4	–	2	–	0
Carnegie Tech		–		5	–	3	–	1
Vermont		–		4	–	2	–	2
Lehigh		–		4	–	3	–	2
Army		–		3	–	2	–	0
Villanova		–		3	–	2	–	0
Dickinson		–		4	–	4	–	1
Syracuse		–		4	–	5	–	1
Bucknell		–		3	–	4	–	2
Boston College		–		3	–	4	–	1
Cornell		–		3	–	4	–	1
New Hampshire		–		3	–	4	–	0
Rhode Island State		–		3	–	4	–	0
Rutgers		–		3	–	5	–	1
Wesleyan		–		3	–	5	–	1
Holy Cross		–		2	–	4	–	2
Swarthmore		–		2	–	5	–	0
Drexel		–		1	–	5	–	3
Tufts		–		2	–	6	–	0
Amherst		–		1	–	6	–	1
Temple		–		0	–	4	–	1

The 1909 Ursinus football team was an American football team that represented Ursinus College during the 1909 college football season. The team compiled a 6–1–1 record and outscored opponents by a total of 205 to 40. John B. Price was the head coach.

== Schedule ==
Date	Opponent	Site	Result	Source
September 25	Williamson School	Collegeville, PA	W 35–0	
September 29	at Penn	Franklin Field; Philadelphia, PA	L 0–22	
October 9	at Lehigh	Bethlehem, PA	T 6–6	
October 16	Medico-Chirurgical	Collegeville, PA	W 45–0	
October 23	Dickinson	Collegeville, PA	W 24–6	
October 30	at George Washington	American League Park; Washington, DC	W 21–0	
November 6	at Stevens	Hoboken, NJ	W 40–0	
November 13	Swarthmore	Collegeville, PA	W 34–6	
