= 1909 New Hampshire football team =

American college football season

1909 New Hampshire football
- Conference: Independent
- Record: 3–4
- Head coach: Willard Gildersleeve (1st season)
- Captain: Harold C. Read (Note: James M. Leonard had been selected as 1909 captain-elect at the close of the 1908 season, but he did not return to college.)
- Home stadium: College grounds, Durham, NH

1909 Eastern college football independents records
	Conf.			Overall
Team	W	L	T	W		L		T
Yale		–		10	–	0	–	0
Lafayette		–		7	–	0	–	1
Franklin & Marshall		–		9	–	1	–	0
Harvard		–		9	–	1	–	0
Penn State		–		5	–	0	–	2
Washington & Jefferson		–		8	–	1	–	1
Springfield Training School		–		5	–	1	–	0
NYU		–		6	–	1	–	1
Ursinus		–		6	–	1	–	1
Penn		–		7	–	1	–	2
Trinity (CT)		–		6	–	1	–	2
Dartmouth		–		5	–	1	–	2
Fordham		–		5	–	1	–	2
Princeton		–		6	–	2	–	1
Pittsburgh		–		6	–	2	–	1
Carlisle		–		8	–	3	–	1
Colgate		–		5	–	2	–	1
Brown		–		7	–	3	–	1
Geneva		–		4	–	2	–	0
Carnegie Tech		–		5	–	3	–	1
Vermont		–		4	–	2	–	2
Lehigh		–		4	–	3	–	2
Army		–		3	–	2	–	0
Villanova		–		3	–	2	–	0
Dickinson		–		4	–	4	–	1
Syracuse		–		4	–	5	–	1
Bucknell		–		3	–	4	–	2
Boston College		–		3	–	4	–	1
Cornell		–		3	–	4	–	1
New Hampshire		–		3	–	4	–	0
Rhode Island State		–		3	–	4	–	0
Rutgers		–		3	–	5	–	1
Wesleyan		–		3	–	5	–	1
Holy Cross		–		2	–	4	–	2
Swarthmore		–		2	–	5	–	0
Drexel		–		1	–	5	–	3
Tufts		–		2	–	6	–	0
Amherst		–		1	–	6	–	1
Temple		–		0	–	4	–	1

The 1909 New Hampshire football team (Note: The school did not adopt the Wildcats nickname until February 1926; before then, they were generally referred to as "the blue and white".) was an American football team that represented New Hampshire College of Agriculture and the Mechanic Arts (Note: The school was often referred to as New Hampshire College or New Hampshire State College in newspapers of the era.) during the 1909 college football season—the school became the University of New Hampshire in 1923. Under first-year head coach Willard Gildersleeve, the team finished with a record of 3–4.

== Schedule ==
Scoring during this era awarded five points for a touchdown, one point for a conversion kick (extra point), and three points for a field goal. (Note: A field goal had been worth four points during 1904–1908, and five points in 1903 and earlier.) Teams played in the one-platoon system, and games were played in two halves rather than four quarters.

Date	Opponent	Site	Result	Attendance	Source
October 2	at Holy Cross	Fitton Field; Worcester, MA	L 0–13		
October 9	at Maine	Orono, ME (rivalry)	L 0–16		
October 16	Bates	Durham, NH	L 0–16		
October 23	Boston College	Durham, NH	W 11–6		
October 30	at Vermont	Centennial Field; Burlington, VT	L 0–11		
November 6	Massachusetts	Manchester, NH (rivalry)	W 17–0		
November 13	Rhode Island State	Durham, NH	W 11–5		

== Team ==
Varsity letters were awarded to 13 players and the team's student manager:

- F. Chase
- Davison
- Jones
- Lawrence
- Lowd
- Morgan
- Pettengill
- B. F. Proud
- B. W. Proud (manager)
- Read (captain)
- E. Sanborn
- H. Sanborn
- T. Twomey
- Watson

Coach Gildersleeve was paid $400 ($14,333 in 2025) for coaching the team for the season.
