= 1909 Carlisle Indians football team =

American college football season

1909 Carlisle Indians football
- Conference: Independent
- Record: 8–3–1
- Head coach: Pop Warner (8th season)
- Offensive scheme: Single-wing
- Home stadium: Indian Field

1909 Eastern college football independents records
	Conf.			Overall
Team	W	L	T	W		L		T
Yale		–		10	–	0	–	0
Lafayette		–		7	–	0	–	1
Franklin & Marshall		–		9	–	1	–	0
Harvard		–		9	–	1	–	0
Penn State		–		5	–	0	–	2
Washington & Jefferson		–		8	–	1	–	1
Springfield Training School		–		5	–	1	–	0
NYU		–		6	–	1	–	1
Ursinus		–		6	–	1	–	1
Penn		–		7	–	1	–	2
Trinity (CT)		–		6	–	1	–	2
Dartmouth		–		5	–	1	–	2
Fordham		–		5	–	1	–	2
Princeton		–		6	–	2	–	1
Pittsburgh		–		6	–	2	–	1
Carlisle		–		8	–	3	–	1
Colgate		–		5	–	2	–	1
Brown		–		7	–	3	–	1
Geneva		–		4	–	2	–	0
Carnegie Tech		–		5	–	3	–	1
Vermont		–		4	–	2	–	2
Lehigh		–		4	–	3	–	2
Army		–		3	–	2	–	0
Villanova		–		3	–	2	–	0
Dickinson		–		4	–	4	–	1
Syracuse		–		4	–	5	–	1
Bucknell		–		3	–	4	–	2
Boston College		–		3	–	4	–	1
Cornell		–		3	–	4	–	1
New Hampshire		–		3	–	4	–	0
Rhode Island State		–		3	–	4	–	0
Rutgers		–		3	–	5	–	1
Wesleyan		–		3	–	5	–	1
Holy Cross		–		2	–	4	–	2
Swarthmore		–		2	–	5	–	0
Drexel		–		1	–	5	–	3
Tufts		–		2	–	6	–	0
Amherst		–		1	–	6	–	1
Temple		–		0	–	4	–	1

The 1909 Carlisle Indians football team represented the Carlisle Indian Industrial School as an independent during the 1909 college football season. Led by eighth-year head coach Pop Warner, the Indians compiled a record of 10–2–1 and outscored opponents 243 to 94. Warner's team ran the single-wing on offense.

== Schedule ==
Date	Time	Opponent	Site	Result	Attendance	Source
September 18		Steelton YMCA	Indian Field; Carlisle, PA	W 35–0		
September 22		Lebanon Valley	Indian Field; Carlisle, PA	W 36–0		
September 25		Villanova	Indian Field; Carlisle, PA	W 9–0		
October 2		Bucknell	Indian Field; Carlisle, PA	W 48–6		
October 9		vs. Penn State	Driving Park; Wilkes-Barre, PA	T 8–8	8,000–10,000	
October 16	2:45 p.m.	vs. Syracuse	Polo Grounds; New York, NY	W 14–11	2,500	
October 23		at Pittsburgh	Forbes Field; Pittsburgh, PA	L 3–14	4,000	
October 30		at Penn	Franklin Field; Philadelphia, PA	L 6–29		
November 6		at George Washington	American League Park; Washington, DC	W 9–5		
November 13		Gettysburg	Indian Field; Carlisle, PA	W 35–0		
November 20	2:40 p.m.	vs. Brown	Polo Grounds; New York, NY	L 8–21		
November 25		at Saint Louis	League Park; St. Louis, MO	W 32–0	12,000	

== See also ==
- 1909 College Football All-America Team
