= 1909 Lehigh Brown and White football team =

American college football season

1909 Lehigh Brown and White football
- Conference: Independent
- Record: 4–3–2
- Head coach: Byron W. Dickson (4th season)

1909 Eastern college football independents records
	Conf.			Overall
Team	W	L	T	W		L		T
Yale		–		10	–	0	–	0
Lafayette		–		7	–	0	–	1
Franklin & Marshall		–		9	–	1	–	0
Harvard		–		9	–	1	–	0
Penn State		–		5	–	0	–	2
Washington & Jefferson		–		8	–	1	–	1
Springfield Training School		–		5	–	1	–	0
NYU		–		6	–	1	–	1
Ursinus		–		6	–	1	–	1
Penn		–		7	–	1	–	2
Trinity (CT)		–		6	–	1	–	2
Dartmouth		–		5	–	1	–	2
Fordham		–		5	–	1	–	2
Princeton		–		6	–	2	–	1
Pittsburgh		–		6	–	2	–	1
Carlisle		–		8	–	3	–	1
Colgate		–		5	–	2	–	1
Brown		–		7	–	3	–	1
Geneva		–		4	–	2	–	0
Carnegie Tech		–		5	–	3	–	1
Vermont		–		4	–	2	–	2
Lehigh		–		4	–	3	–	2
Army		–		3	–	2	–	0
Villanova		–		3	–	2	–	0
Dickinson		–		4	–	4	–	1
Syracuse		–		4	–	5	–	1
Bucknell		–		3	–	4	–	2
Boston College		–		3	–	4	–	1
Cornell		–		3	–	4	–	1
New Hampshire		–		3	–	4	–	0
Rhode Island State		–		3	–	4	–	0
Rutgers		–		3	–	5	–	1
Wesleyan		–		3	–	5	–	1
Holy Cross		–		2	–	4	–	2
Swarthmore		–		2	–	5	–	0
Drexel		–		1	–	5	–	3
Tufts		–		2	–	6	–	0
Amherst		–		1	–	6	–	1
Temple		–		0	–	4	–	1

The 1909 Lehigh Brown and White football team was an American football team represented Lehigh University as an independent during the 1909 college football season. The team compiled a 4–3–2 record. Byron W. Dickson was the head coach.

== Schedule ==
Date	Time	Opponent	Site	Result	Attendance	Source
September 29		Lebanon Valley	South Bethlehem, PA	W 24–0		
October 2		Franklin & Marshall	Lancaster, PA	L 0–10		
October 9		Ursinus	South Bethlehem, PA	T 6–6		
October 16		vs. Virginia	Lafayette Field; Norfolk, VA	W 11–7		
October 23		at Army	The Plain; West Point, NY	L 0–18		
October 30	3:00 p.m.	at Carnegie Tech	Leeds Field; Pittsburgh, PA	W 18–11		
November 6		Haverford	Haverford, PA	W 18–0		
November 13		NYU	South Bethlehem, PA	T 6–6		
November 20		Lafayette	South Bethlehem, PA (rivalry)	L 0–21		
All times are in Eastern time
