= 1909 Connecticut Aggies football team =

American college football season

1909 Connecticut Aggies football
- Conference: Athletic League of New England State Colleges
- Record: 3–5 (0–1 New England)
- Head coach: S. Frank G. McLean (1st season)
- Home stadium: Athletic Fields

The 1909 Connecticut Aggies football team represented Connecticut Agricultural College, now the University of Connecticut, in the 1909 college football season. The Aggies were led by first-year head coach S. Frank G. McLean, and completed the season with a record of 3–5.

== Schedule ==
Date	Time	Opponent	Site	Result	Source
September 25		at Springfield Training School	Springfield, MA	Cancelled	
October 2		at Cushing Academy*	Ashburnham, MA	L 0–45	
October 9		Fort Mitchell*	Athletic Fields; Storrs, CT	W 49–0	
October 18		Jewett City*	Athletic Fields; Storrs, CT	W 34–0	
October 30		Bridgewater Normal*	Athletic Fields; Storrs, CT	W 16–6	
November 6	3:00 p.m.	at Trinity (CT)*	Trinity Field; Hartford, CT	L 0–64	
November 13		Boston College*	Athletic Fields; Storrs, CT	L 0–17	
November 20		at Rhode Island State	Kingston, RI (rivalry)	L 0–51	
November 27		Norwich Free Academy*	Athletic Fields; Storrs, CT	L 0–7	
*Non-conference game
