= 1909 Brown Bears football team =

American college football season

1909 Brown Bears football
- Conference: Independent
- Record: 7–3
- Head coach: J. A. Gammons (3rd season)
- Captain: Adrian Regnier
- Home stadium: Andrews Field

1909 Eastern college football independents records
	Conf.			Overall
Team	W	L	T	W		L		T
Yale		–		10	–	0	–	0
Lafayette		–		7	–	0	–	1
Franklin & Marshall		–		9	–	1	–	0
Harvard		–		9	–	1	–	0
Penn State		–		5	–	0	–	2
Washington & Jefferson		–		8	–	1	–	1
Springfield Training School		–		5	–	1	–	0
NYU		–		6	–	1	–	1
Ursinus		–		6	–	1	–	1
Penn		–		7	–	1	–	2
Trinity (CT)		–		6	–	1	–	2
Dartmouth		–		5	–	1	–	2
Fordham		–		5	–	1	–	2
Princeton		–		6	–	2	–	1
Pittsburgh		–		6	–	2	–	1
Carlisle		–		8	–	3	–	1
Colgate		–		5	–	2	–	1
Brown		–		7	–	3	–	1
Geneva		–		4	–	2	–	0
Carnegie Tech		–		5	–	3	–	1
Vermont		–		4	–	2	–	2
Lehigh		–		4	–	3	–	2
Army		–		3	–	2	–	0
Villanova		–		3	–	2	–	0
Dickinson		–		4	–	4	–	1
Syracuse		–		4	–	5	–	1
Bucknell		–		3	–	4	–	2
Boston College		–		3	–	4	–	1
Cornell		–		3	–	4	–	1
New Hampshire		–		3	–	4	–	0
Rhode Island State		–		3	–	4	–	0
Rutgers		–		3	–	5	–	1
Wesleyan		–		3	–	5	–	1
Holy Cross		–		2	–	4	–	2
Swarthmore		–		2	–	5	–	0
Drexel		–		1	–	5	–	3
Tufts		–		2	–	6	–	0
Amherst		–		1	–	6	–	1
Temple		–		0	–	4	–	1

The 1909 Brown Bears football team represented Brown University as an independent during the 1909 college football season. Led by third-year head coach J. A. Gammons, Brown compiled a record of 7–3.

== Schedule ==
Date	Opponent	Site	Result	Source
September 29	Rhode Island State	Andrews Field; Providence, RI (rivalry)	W 6–0	
October 2	Colgate	Andrews Field; Providence, RI	W 14–0	
October 6	Bates	Andrews Field; Providence, RI	W 17–0	
October 9	Amherst	Andrews Field; Providence, RI	W 10–0	
October 16	at Penn	Franklin Field; Philadelphia, PA	L 5–13	
October 23	at Harvard	Harvard Stadium; Boston, MA	L 0–11	
October 30	Massachusetts	Andrews Field; Providence, RI	W 12–3	
November 6	at Yale	Yale Field; New Haven, CT	L 0–23	
November 13	Vermont	Andrews Field; Providence, RI	W 17–0	
November 20	vs. Carlisle	Polo Grounds; New York, NY	W 21–8	
