= 1909 Yale Bulldogs football team =

American college football season

1909 Yale Bulldogs football

National champion
- Conference: Independent
- Record: 10–0
- Head coach: Howard Jones (1st season)
- Captain: Ted Coy
- Home stadium: Yale Field

1909 Eastern college football independents records
	Conf.			Overall
Team	W	L	T	W		L		T
Yale		–		10	–	0	–	0
Lafayette		–		7	–	0	–	1
Franklin & Marshall		–		9	–	1	–	0
Harvard		–		9	–	1	–	0
Penn State		–		5	–	0	–	2
Washington & Jefferson		–		8	–	1	–	1
Springfield Training School		–		5	–	1	–	0
NYU		–		6	–	1	–	1
Ursinus		–		6	–	1	–	1
Penn		–		7	–	1	–	2
Trinity (CT)		–		6	–	1	–	2
Dartmouth		–		5	–	1	–	2
Fordham		–		5	–	1	–	2
Princeton		–		6	–	2	–	1
Pittsburgh		–		6	–	2	–	1
Carlisle		–		8	–	3	–	1
Colgate		–		5	–	2	–	1
Brown		–		7	–	3	–	1
Geneva		–		4	–	2	–	0
Carnegie Tech		–		5	–	3	–	1
Vermont		–		4	–	2	–	2
Lehigh		–		4	–	3	–	2
Army		–		3	–	2	–	0
Villanova		–		3	–	2	–	0
Dickinson		–		4	–	4	–	1
Syracuse		–		4	–	5	–	1
Bucknell		–		3	–	4	–	2
Boston College		–		3	–	4	–	1
Cornell		–		3	–	4	–	1
New Hampshire		–		3	–	4	–	0
Rhode Island State		–		3	–	4	–	0
Rutgers		–		3	–	5	–	1
Wesleyan		–		3	–	5	–	1
Holy Cross		–		2	–	4	–	2
Swarthmore		–		2	–	5	–	0
Drexel		–		1	–	5	–	3
Tufts		–		2	–	6	–	0
Amherst		–		1	–	6	–	1
Temple		–		0	–	4	–	1

The 1909 Yale Bulldogs football team was an American football team that represented Yale University as an independent during the 1909 college football season. The team finished with a 10–0 record, shut out every opponent, and outscored them by a total of 209 to 0. Howard Jones was the team's head coach, and Ted Coy was the team captain.

There was no contemporaneous system in 1909 for determining a national champion. However, Yale was retroactively named as the national champion by the Billingsley Report, Helms Athletic Foundation, Houlgate System, National Championship Foundation, and Parke H. Davis.

Six Yale players were selected as consensus first-team players on the 1909 All-America team. The team's consensus All-Americans were: fullback Ted Coy; halfback Stephen Philbin; end John Kilpatrick; center Carroll Cooney; guard Hamlin Andrus; and tackle Henry Hobbs.

== Schedule ==
Date	Opponent	Site	Result	Attendance	Source
September 29	Wesleyan	Yale Field; New Haven, CT	W 11–0		
October 2	Syracuse	Yale Field; New Haven, CT	W 15–0		
October 6	Holy Cross	Yale Field; New Haven, CT	W 12–0	3,000	
October 9	Springfield Training School	Yale Field; New Haven, CT	W 36–0	6,000	
October 16	at Army	The Plain; West Point, NY	W 17–0		
October 23	Colgate	Yale Field; New Haven, CT	W 36–0		
October 30	Amherst	Yale Field; New Haven, CT	W 34–0		
November 6	Brown	Yale Field; New Haven, CT	W 23–0		
November 13	Princeton	Yale Field; New Haven, CT (rivalry)	W 17–0		
November 20	at Harvard	Harvard Stadium; Boston, MA (rivalry)	W 8–0		

== Roster ==
- Hamlin Andrus, G
- Henry P. Bingham, QB
- Walter L. Brown, G
- Carroll Cooney, T
- Allan L. Corey, QB
- Ted Coy, FB
- Fred Daly, HB
- Robert C. Deming, FB
- John Field, HB
- Pomeroy T. Francis, C
- French, HB
- Myron Fuller, C
- William Goebel, G
- George Hains, E
- Hall, G
- Henry Hobbs, T
- Henry G. Holt, HB
- Art Howe, QB
- Hyde, C
- James F. Johnson, QB
- John Kilpatrick, E
- Erle O. Kistler, FB
- Theodore Lilley, T
- Walter S. Logan, E
- Messinger, HB
- Effingham B. Morris, C
- Fred J. Murphy, HB
- Theodore C. Naedele
- Parker, T
- Charles H. Paul, T
- Stephen Philbin, HB
- Edward Savage, E
- J. Brooks Spencer
- Adrian Van Sinderen, E
- Daniel G. Tomlinson, T
- Harry Vaughan, E
