= 1909 Harvard Crimson football team =

American college football season

1909 Harvard Crimson football
- Conference: Independent
- Record: 9–1
- Head coach: Percy Haughton (2nd season)
- Home stadium: Harvard Stadium

1909 Eastern college football independents records
	Conf.			Overall
Team	W	L	T	W		L		T
Yale		–		10	–	0	–	0
Lafayette		–		7	–	0	–	1
Franklin & Marshall		–		9	–	1	–	0
Harvard		–		9	–	1	–	0
Penn State		–		5	–	0	–	2
Washington & Jefferson		–		8	–	1	–	1
Springfield Training School		–		5	–	1	–	0
NYU		–		6	–	1	–	1
Ursinus		–		6	–	1	–	1
Penn		–		7	–	1	–	2
Trinity (CT)		–		6	–	1	–	2
Dartmouth		–		5	–	1	–	2
Fordham		–		5	–	1	–	2
Princeton		–		6	–	2	–	1
Pittsburgh		–		6	–	2	–	1
Carlisle		–		8	–	3	–	1
Colgate		–		5	–	2	–	1
Brown		–		7	–	3	–	1
Geneva		–		4	–	2	–	0
Carnegie Tech		–		5	–	3	–	1
Vermont		–		4	–	2	–	2
Lehigh		–		4	–	3	–	2
Army		–		3	–	2	–	0
Villanova		–		3	–	2	–	0
Dickinson		–		4	–	4	–	1
Syracuse		–		4	–	5	–	1
Bucknell		–		3	–	4	–	2
Boston College		–		3	–	4	–	1
Cornell		–		3	–	4	–	1
New Hampshire		–		3	–	4	–	0
Rhode Island State		–		3	–	4	–	0
Rutgers		–		3	–	5	–	1
Wesleyan		–		3	–	5	–	1
Holy Cross		–		2	–	4	–	2
Swarthmore		–		2	–	5	–	0
Drexel		–		1	–	5	–	3
Tufts		–		2	–	6	–	0
Amherst		–		1	–	6	–	1
Temple		–		0	–	4	–	1

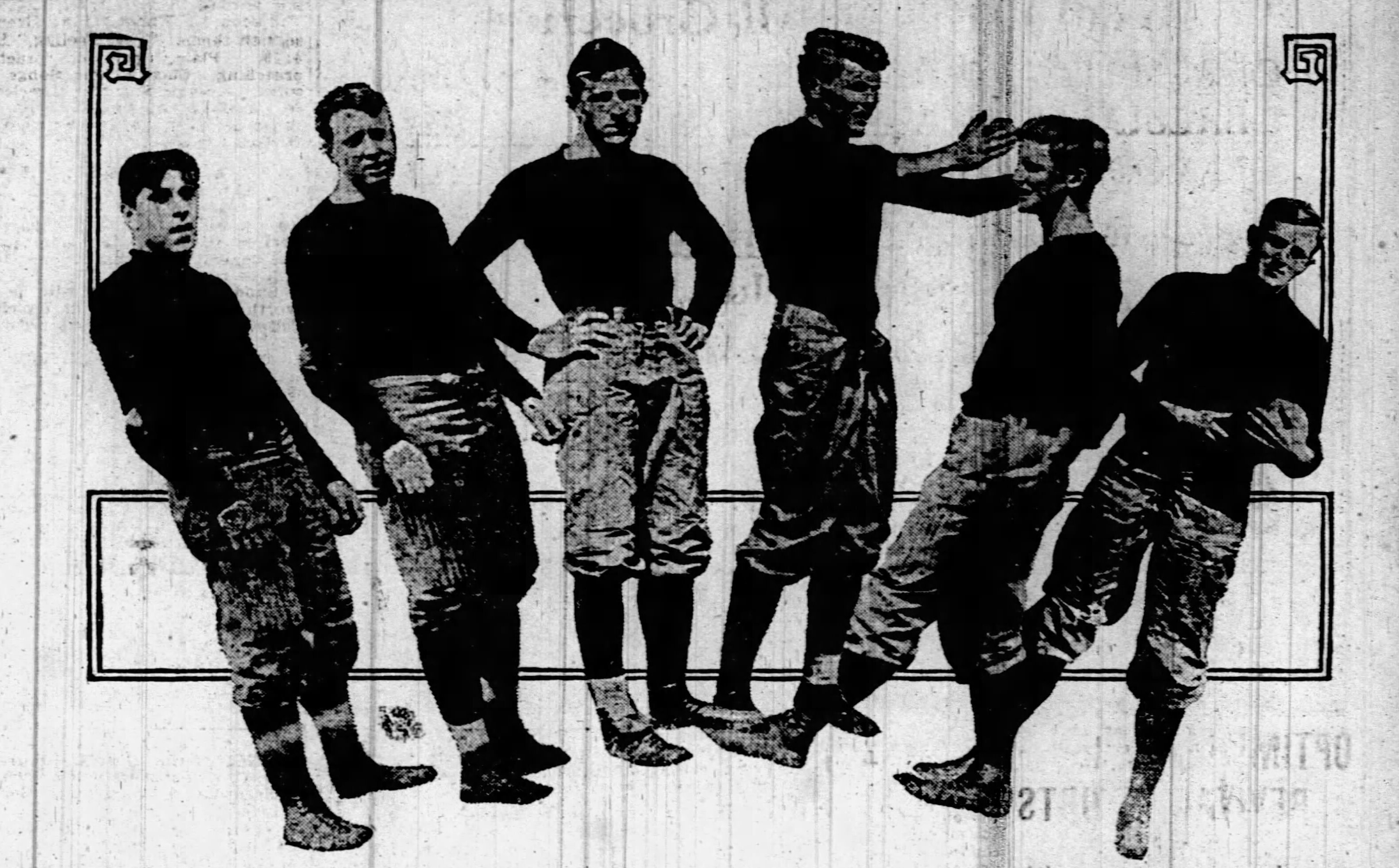
Photo of the 1909 Harvard Crimson players in The Muscatine Journal.

The 1909 Harvard Crimson football team represented Harvard University. The Crimson were led by second-year head coach Percy Haughton and played their home games at Harvard Stadium. They finished the season with a 9–1 record.

== Schedule ==
Date	Opponent	Site	Result	Source
September 29	Bates	Harvard Stadium; Boston, MA	W 11–0	
October 2	Bowdoin	Harvard Stadium; Boston, MA	W 17–0	
October 9	Williams	Harvard Stadium; Boston, MA	W 8–6	
October 16	Maine	Harvard Stadium; Boston, MA	W 17–0	
October 23	Brown	Harvard Stadium; Boston, MA	W 11–0	
October 30	Army	The Plain; West Point, NY	W 9–0	
November 6	Cornell	Harvard Stadium; Boston, MA	W 18–0	
November 13	Dartmouth	Harvard Stadium; Boston, MA (rivalry)	W 12–3	
November 20	Yale	Harvard Stadium; Boston, MA (rivalry)	L 0–8	
