= Ohio Field (Bronx) =

Sports stadium in New York City

- Location within New York City Location within New York
- Location: The Bronx, New York
- Coordinates: 40°51′28″N 73°54′40″W
- Owner: Bronx Community College
- Surface: grass

Tenants
- Bronx Broncos; NYU Violets (former)

Ohio Field is the main outdoor athletic facility at Bronx Community College in the University Heights neighborhood of the Bronx in New York City.

The field consists of a baseball diamond and large, natural grass outfield, surrounded by a 200-meter running track. Bronx Community College's athletics teams use the field for baseball and men's soccer.

Early in the 20th century, Ohio Field was the main outdoor athletic venue for New York University, which occupied the University Heights campus until 1973. It was the home of the NYU Violets baseball and football teams dating back at least to 1901. It was also used for soccer and track and field competitions. NYU baseball and soccer continued to be played until the 1971–72 academic year.

As NYU's football program grew in stature, the team began to play some, and eventually most, of its games at larger stadiums off-campus, such as the Polo Grounds and Yankee Stadium, though it continued to use Ohio Field as a practice facility.

By 1952, when NYU discontinued varsity football, all home games were at Triborough Stadium on Randalls Island.

The field was the site of outdoor graduation ceremonies for NYU into the 1960s.
