= 1904 Fordham football team =

American college football season

1904 Fordham football
- Conference: Independent
- Record: 22–6 / 4–1–1
- Head coach: Fred L. Smith (2nd season)
- Captain: Edward Glennon

1904 Eastern college football independents records
	Conf.			Overall
Team	W	L	T	W		L		T
Penn		–		12	–	0	–	0
Western U. of Penn.		–		10	–	0	–	0
Dartmouth		–		7	–	0	–	1
Yale		–		10	–	1	–	0
Amherst		–		9	–	1	–	0
Colgate		–		8	–	1	–	1
Carlisle		–		10	–	2	–	0
Lafayette		–		8	–	2	–	0
Princeton		–		8	–	2	–	0
Army		–		7	–	2	–	0
Fordham		–		4	–	1	–	1
Harvard		–		7	–	2	–	1
Dickinson		–		8	–	3	–	1
Columbia		–		7	–	3	–	0
Cornell		–		7	–	3	–	0
Villanova		–		4	–	2	–	1
Syracuse		–		6	–	3	–	0
Swarthmore		–		6	–	3	–	0
Washington & Jefferson		–		5	–	3	–	1
Penn State		–		6	–	4	–	0
Temple		–		3	–	2	–	0
Brown		–		6	–	5	–	0
Bucknell		–		3	–	3	–	0
Springfield Training School		–		4	–	4	–	1
NYU		–		3	–	6	–	0
Holy Cross		–		2	–	5	–	2
Wesleyan		–		3	–	7	–	0
Geneva		–		1	–	4	–	2
Vermont		–		1	–	5	–	2
New Hampshire		–		2	–	5	–	0
Rutgers		–		1	–	6	–	2
Tufts		–		2	–	9	–	1
Lehigh		–		1	–	8	–	0
Franklin & Marshall		–		0	–	10	–	0

The 1904 Fordham football team was an American football team that represented Fordham University as an independent during the 1904 college football season. Fordham claims a 22–6 record, though College Football Data Warehouse (CFDW) lists the team's record as 4–1–1.

Fred L. Smith was the coach for the second year. Fullback Edward Glennon was the captain.

== Schedule ==
The following six games are reported in Fordham's media guide, CFDW, and contemporaneous press coverage.

Date	Opponent	Site	Result	Attendance	Source
October 8	at NYU	Ohio Field; New York, NY	W 21–0		
October 15	RPI	Bronx, NY	W 21–0		
October 22	Delaware		W 12–0		
November 5	Villanova	Fordham Heights; Bronx, NY	T 6–6		
November 19	Seton Hall		L 0–6		
November 24	at Pittsfield Athletic Club	Berkshire Athletic Field; Berkshire, MA	W 10–0	800	

The following are additional games reported in the Fordham media guide.

Date	Opponent	Site	Result	Source
	Betts Academy		W 5–2	
October 1	Webster Academy		W 38–0	
	St. Joseph's		W (forfeit)	
	St. Francis Xavier		L 10–30	
	Resolute Athletic Club		W 13–7	
	CCNY		W 30–6	
	Medico		W 30–0	
	Betts Academy		W 21–6	
	Audubon Field Society		L 0–13	
	Nutley Athletic Club		W 12–6	
	Murray Hill Athletic Club		W 13–6	
	Fordham Prep		W 24–7	
	Union		W 1–0	
	Fordham Prep		W 26–0	
	Fordham Prep		W 21–14	
	Bethay Athletic Club		W 17–12	
	Belmont Abbey		W 11–8	
	Brooklyn		L 6–17	
	Heght School		W 20–11	
	Berkshire		L	
	Xavier		L	
