= 1904 college football rankings =

- Season: 1904
- Bowl season: 1904–05 bowl games
- End of season champions: Yale

The 1904 college football season rankings included a ranking by Caspar Whitney for Outing.

== Caspar Whitney ==
Writing for Outing, alongside his All-America Eleven for 1904, Caspar Whitney ranked the top twenty-two teams in the country at the conclusion of the season.

Whitney is designated by the National Collegiate Athletic Association (NCAA) as a "major selector" of national championships, and his contemporary rankings in Outing for 1905–1907 are included in the NCAA college football records book.

Rank	Team	Record
1	Yale	10–1
2	Penn	12–0
3	Army	7–2
4	Princeton	8–2
5	Harvard	7–2–1
6	Dartmouth	7–0–1
7	Minnesota	13–0
8	Michigan	10–0
9	Amherst	9–1
10	Chicago	10–1–1
11	Navy	7–2–1
12	Lafayette	8–2
13	Wisconsin	5–3
14	Carlisle	10–2
15	Haskell	8–1
16	Nebraska	7–3
17	Northwestern	8–2
18	Columbia	7–3
19	Maine	3–4
20	Brown	6–5
21	Illinois	9–2–1
22	Cornell	7–3

== See also ==
- 1904 College Football All-America Team
