= Bob Torrey =

Bob Torrey may refer to:

- Robert Torrey (1878–1941), American college football player and coach, member of the College Football Hall of Fame
- Bob Torrey (running back) (born 1957), American football running back
