= 1904 Villanova Wildcats football team =

American college football season

1904 Villanova Wildcats football
- Conference: Independent
- Record: 4–2–1
- Head coach: Fred Crolius (1st season)
- Captain: Patrick O'Connor

1904 Eastern college football independents records
	Conf.			Overall
Team	W	L	T	W		L		T
Penn		–		12	–	0	–	0
Western U. of Penn.		–		10	–	0	–	0
Dartmouth		–		7	–	0	–	1
Yale		–		10	–	1	–	0
Amherst		–		9	–	1	–	0
Colgate		–		8	–	1	–	1
Carlisle		–		10	–	2	–	0
Lafayette		–		8	–	2	–	0
Princeton		–		8	–	2	–	0
Army		–		7	–	2	–	0
Fordham		–		4	–	1	–	1
Harvard		–		7	–	2	–	1
Dickinson		–		8	–	3	–	1
Columbia		–		7	–	3	–	0
Cornell		–		7	–	3	–	0
Villanova		–		4	–	2	–	1
Syracuse		–		6	–	3	–	0
Swarthmore		–		6	–	3	–	0
Washington & Jefferson		–		5	–	3	–	1
Penn State		–		6	–	4	–	0
Temple		–		3	–	2	–	0
Brown		–		6	–	5	–	0
Bucknell		–		3	–	3	–	0
Springfield Training School		–		4	–	4	–	1
NYU		–		3	–	6	–	0
Holy Cross		–		2	–	5	–	2
Wesleyan		–		3	–	7	–	0
Geneva		–		1	–	4	–	2
Vermont		–		1	–	5	–	2
New Hampshire		–		2	–	5	–	0
Rutgers		–		1	–	6	–	2
Tufts		–		2	–	9	–	1
Lehigh		–		1	–	8	–	0
Franklin & Marshall		–		0	–	10	–	0

The 1904 Villanova Wildcats football team represented the Villanova University during the 1904 college football season. Led by first-year head coach Fred Crolius, Villanova compiled a record of 4–2–1. The team's captain was Patrick O'Connor.

== Schedule ==
Date	Opponent	Site	Result	Source
October 1	at Bucknell	Lewisburg, PA	L 0–26	
October 5	at Georgetown	Georgetown Field; Washington, DC	L 0–17	
	at Washington College	Chestertown, MD	W 38–0	
November 5	at Fordham	Fordham Heights; Bronx, NY	T 6–6	
	Washington College	Villanova, PA	W 11–5	
November 24	at Medico-Chi	Columbia Park; Philadelphia, PA	W 23–6	
	at Pennsylvania Military	Chester, PA	W 23–6	
