= 1904 NYU Violets football team =

American college football season

1904 NYU Violets football
- Conference: Independent
- Record: 3–6
- Head coach: Dave Fultz (1st season)
- Home stadium: Ohio Field

1904 Eastern college football independents records
	Conf.			Overall
Team	W	L	T	W		L		T
Penn		–		12	–	0	–	0
Western U. of Penn.		–		10	–	0	–	0
Dartmouth		–		7	–	0	–	1
Yale		–		10	–	1	–	0
Amherst		–		9	–	1	–	0
Colgate		–		8	–	1	–	1
Carlisle		–		10	–	2	–	0
Lafayette		–		8	–	2	–	0
Princeton		–		8	–	2	–	0
Army		–		7	–	2	–	0
Fordham		–		4	–	1	–	1
Harvard		–		7	–	2	–	1
Dickinson		–		8	–	3	–	1
Columbia		–		7	–	3	–	0
Cornell		–		7	–	3	–	0
Villanova		–		4	–	2	–	1
Syracuse		–		6	–	3	–	0
Swarthmore		–		6	–	3	–	0
Washington & Jefferson		–		5	–	3	–	1
Penn State		–		6	–	4	–	0
Temple		–		3	–	2	–	0
Brown		–		6	–	5	–	0
Bucknell		–		3	–	3	–	0
Springfield Training School		–		4	–	4	–	1
NYU		–		3	–	6	–	0
Holy Cross		–		2	–	5	–	2
Wesleyan		–		3	–	7	–	0
Geneva		–		1	–	4	–	2
Vermont		–		1	–	5	–	2
New Hampshire		–		2	–	5	–	0
Rutgers		–		1	–	6	–	2
Tufts		–		2	–	9	–	1
Lehigh		–		1	–	8	–	0
Franklin & Marshall		–		0	–	10	–	0

The 1904 NYU Violets football team was an American football team that represented New York University as an independent during the 1904 college football season. In their only year under head coach Dave Fultz, the team compiled a 3–6 record.

== Schedule ==
Date	Opponent	Site	Result	Source
October 5	at Amherst	Pratt Field; Amherst, MA	L 0–23	
October 8	Fordham	Ohio Field; Bronx, NY	L 0–21	
October 15	at Rochester	Culver Field; Rochester, NY	L 5–6	
October 22	Trinity (CT)	Ohio Field; Bronx, NY	W 6–0	
October 29	RPI	Ohio Field; Bronx, NY	W 53–0	
November 5	Haverford	Ohio Field; Bronx, NY	L 0–34	
November 8	Rutgers	Ohio Field; Bronx, NY	W 35–6	
November 12	at Army	The Plain; West Point, NY	L 0–41	
November 19	Union (NY)	Ohio Field; Bronx, NY	L 0–21	
