= 1904 Massachusetts Aggies football team =

American college football season

1904 Massachusetts Aggies football
- Conference: Athletic League of New England State Colleges
- Record: 5–2–1 ( Athletic League of New England State Colleges)
- Head coach: Matthew W. Bullock (1st season)
- Home stadium: Alumni Field

The 1904 Massachusetts Aggies football team represented Massachusetts Agricultural College in the 1904 college football season. The team was coached by Matthew W. Bullock and played its home games at Alumni Field in Amherst, Massachusetts. The 1904 season was Bullock's first as head coach of the Aggies. He would leave the team following the season, but return to coach again in 1907. Massachusetts finished the season with a record of 5–2–1.

== Schedule ==
Date	Opponent	Site	Result	Attendance	Source
September 28	at Holy Cross	Holy Cross Field; Worcester, MA	T 0–0		
October 1	at Dartmouth	Alumni Oval; Hanover, NH	L 0–17		
October 5	at Williams	Weston Field; Williamstown, MA	W 12–0		
October 8	at Brown	Providence, RI	L 0–27		
October 15	at Wesleyan	Andrus Field; Middletown, CT	W 24–6		
October 22	at Springfield Training School	Springfield, MA	W 11–0	2,000	
November 5	Worcester Tech	Alumni Field; Amherst, MA	W 39–0		
November 19	at Tufts	Tufts Oval; Somerville, MA	W 11–0		
