= 1904 Penn State football team =

American college football season

1904 Penn State football
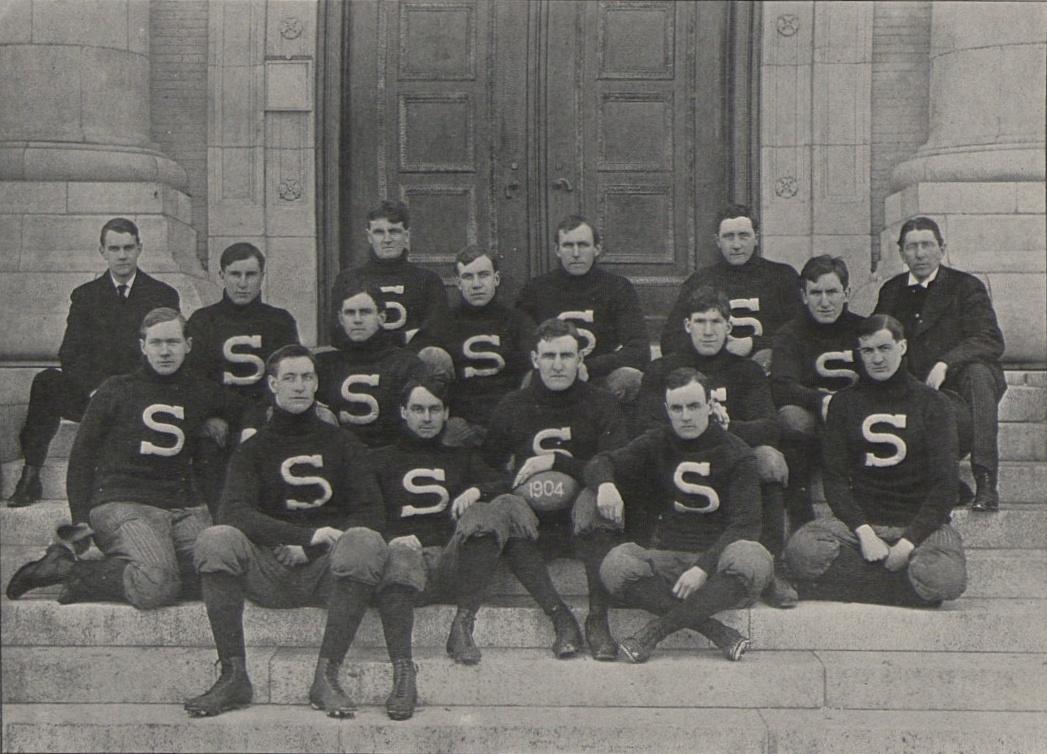
- Conference: Independent
- Record: 6–4
- Head coach: Tom Fennell (1st season)
- Captain: Carl Forkum
- Home stadium: Beaver Field

1904 Eastern college football independents records
	Conf.			Overall
Team	W	L	T	W		L		T
Penn		–		12	–	0	–	0
Western U. of Penn.		–		10	–	0	–	0
Dartmouth		–		7	–	0	–	1
Yale		–		10	–	1	–	0
Amherst		–		9	–	1	–	0
Colgate		–		8	–	1	–	1
Carlisle		–		10	–	2	–	0
Lafayette		–		8	–	2	–	0
Princeton		–		8	–	2	–	0
Army		–		7	–	2	–	0
Fordham		–		4	–	1	–	1
Harvard		–		7	–	2	–	1
Dickinson		–		8	–	3	–	1
Columbia		–		7	–	3	–	0
Cornell		–		7	–	3	–	0
Villanova		–		4	–	2	–	1
Syracuse		–		6	–	3	–	0
Swarthmore		–		6	–	3	–	0
Washington & Jefferson		–		5	–	3	–	1
Penn State		–		6	–	4	–	0
Temple		–		3	–	2	–	0
Brown		–		6	–	5	–	0
Bucknell		–		3	–	3	–	0
Springfield Training School		–		4	–	4	–	1
NYU		–		3	–	6	–	0
Holy Cross		–		2	–	5	–	2
Wesleyan		–		3	–	7	–	0
Geneva		–		1	–	4	–	2
Vermont		–		1	–	5	–	2
New Hampshire		–		2	–	5	–	0
Rutgers		–		1	–	6	–	2
Tufts		–		2	–	9	–	1
Lehigh		–		1	–	8	–	0
Franklin & Marshall		–		0	–	10	–	0

The 1904 Penn State football team was an American football team that represented Pennsylvania State College—now known as Pennsylvania State University–as an independent during the 1904 college football season. The team was coached by Tom Fennell and played its home games on Beaver Field in State College, Pennsylvania.

Notably, 1904 marked the first season where WUP/Pitt, Penn State, and West Virginia played a full round robin. Thus, 1904 marked the first season of the district championship.

== Schedule ==
Date	Opponent	Site	Result	Attendance	Source
September 24	at Penn	Franklin Field; Philadelphia, PA	L 0–6		
October 1	Allegheny	Beaver Field; State College, PA	W 50–0		
October 8	at Yale	Yale Field; New Haven, CT	L 0–24		
October 15	West Virginia	Beaver Field; State College, PA (rivalry)	W 34–0		
October 22	vs. Washington & Jefferson	Exposition Park; Pittsburgh, PA	W 12–0	4,100	
October 29	Jersey Shore Athletic Club	Beaver Field; State College, PA	W 30–0		
November 5	at Navy	Worden Field; Annapolis, MD	L 9–20		
November 12	vs. Dickinson	Williamsport, PA	W 11–0		
November 19	Geneva	Beaver Field; State College, PA	W 44–0		
November 24	at Western University of Pennsylvania	Exposition Park; Pittsburgh, PA (rivalry)	L 5–22	8,500	
