= Robert Torrey =

American football player and coach (1878–1941)

- Image from Chicago Daily News negatives collection, Chicago History Museum

Biographical details
- Born: July 12, 1878; Henrico County, Virginia, U.S.
- Died: January 12, 1941 (aged 62); Philadelphia, Pennsylvania, U.S.

Playing career
- 1903–1905: Penn
- Positions: Center, tackle, end

Coaching career (HC unless noted)
- 1907: Penn (field coach)

Accomplishments and honors

Championships
- National (1904)

Awards
- Consensus All-American (1905); 2× Second-team All-American (1902, 1904)
- College Football Hall of Fame; Inducted in 1971 (profile)

Robert Grant Torrey (July 12, 1878 – January 12, 1941) was an American football player and coach. He played center and was selected as the captain of the University of Pennsylvania's unbeaten teams of 1904 and 1905. When the Quakers went 12–0 in 1904, only Swarthmore was able to score against them. Torrey was considered one of the best linemen in 1905 and later won All-American honors. He was elected to the College Football Hall of Fame in 1971.

== Biography ==
Torrey was from Montclair, New Jersey, where he attended Montclair High School. He enrolled at the University of Pennsylvania in 1902 and played four years of varsity football for the Penn Quakers. As a freshman in 1902, he played at the tackle position, but he was moved to end in 1903. He played center and was selected as the captain of Penn's unbeaten teams of 1904 and 1905. He was selected by his teammates as the captain of the 1905 Penn football team and was selected by Walter Camp and Caspar Whitney as a first-team All-American that year. In April 1907, Torrey was hired as the field coach for Penn's football team. After retiring from football, Torrey was a medical doctor and became the head of the medical board at Philadelphia's General Hospital. He died in 1941.

== The bloodied face photo ==
During an October 7, 1905 game between Swarthmore and Penn, played at Franklin Field, Swarthmore's Tiny Maxwell had his nose broken, his eyes swollen, and nearly shut, and his face dripped with blood. Maxwell reportedly continue to play until near the end of the game, when his face was so bloody and swollen that he could no longer see, yet he never complained of the physical beating. 1905, 18 players died playing college football and 159 were seriously injured. A newspaper photo was taken of face. The photo then found its way to President Theodore Roosevelt. The photograph of Maxwell's face shocked and enraged President Roosevelt into threatening to abolish football, if the colleges themselves did not take steps to eliminate the brutality and reduce injuries. Bob Torrey, was the Penn player opposite of Maxwell that day. Although Torrey can not be personally blamed for Maxwell's injuries, it is no secret that Penn offensive line double and triple-teamed Maxwell, feeling that if they stopped "Tiny" they could finish the season unbeaten.

While several writers and scholars have made exhaustive searches for the photo of Maxwell's battered face, none have ever been found. Though the events surrounding the Roosevelt-Maxwell story supposedly occurred in 1905, the story didn't appear until it was mentioned in the second edition of Frank G. Menke's Encyclopedia of Sports published in 1944. Meanwhile, Maxwell died in 1922. The 1960s and 1970s update of the Encyclopedia also continued to run the Maxwell-Roosevelt story. The Maxwell Football Club, formed by sportswriters and athletic officials to honor Maxwell, picked up the story and made it more credible. As a result, it became the official account of 1905 and was enshrined in Jack Falla's history of the National Collegiate Athletic Association (NCAA) and at the College Football Hall of Fame.

What is absolutely certain is that on October 9, 1905, Teddy Roosevelt held a meeting of football representatives from Harvard, Yale, and Princeton. Though he lectured on eliminating and reducing injuries, he never threatened to ban football or mentioned the Maxwell injury. He also lacked the authority to abolish football. In fact he was actually a fan of the game. The President's sons were also playing football at the college and secondary levels at the time.
