= 1904 Syracuse Orangemen football team =

American college football season

1904 Syracuse Orangemen football
- Conference: Independent
- Record: 6–3
- Head coach: Charles P. Hutchins (1st season)
- Captain: Robert Park
- Home stadium: Old Oval

1904 Eastern college football independents records
	Conf.			Overall
Team	W	L	T	W		L		T
Penn		–		12	–	0	–	0
Western U. of Penn.		–		10	–	0	–	0
Dartmouth		–		7	–	0	–	1
Yale		–		10	–	1	–	0
Amherst		–		9	–	1	–	0
Colgate		–		8	–	1	–	1
Carlisle		–		10	–	2	–	0
Lafayette		–		8	–	2	–	0
Princeton		–		8	–	2	–	0
Army		–		7	–	2	–	0
Fordham		–		4	–	1	–	1
Harvard		–		7	–	2	–	1
Dickinson		–		8	–	3	–	1
Columbia		–		7	–	3	–	0
Cornell		–		7	–	3	–	0
Villanova		–		4	–	2	–	1
Syracuse		–		6	–	3	–	0
Swarthmore		–		6	–	3	–	0
Washington & Jefferson		–		5	–	3	–	1
Penn State		–		6	–	4	–	0
Temple		–		3	–	2	–	0
Brown		–		6	–	5	–	0
Bucknell		–		3	–	3	–	0
Springfield Training School		–		4	–	4	–	1
NYU		–		3	–	6	–	0
Holy Cross		–		2	–	5	–	2
Wesleyan		–		3	–	7	–	0
Geneva		–		1	–	4	–	2
Vermont		–		1	–	5	–	2
New Hampshire		–		2	–	5	–	0
Rutgers		–		1	–	6	–	2
Tufts		–		2	–	9	–	1
Lehigh		–		1	–	8	–	0
Franklin & Marshall		–		0	–	10	–	0

The 1904 Syracuse Orangemen football team represented Syracuse University as an independent during the 1904 college football season. The head coach was Charles P. Hutchins, coaching his first season with the Orangemen.

== Schedule ==
Date	Opponent	Site	Result	Attendance	Source
September 24	Cortland	Syracuse, NY	W 27–0	600	
October 1	Clarkson	Syracuse, NY	W 69–0		
October 8	Colgate	Syracuse, NY (rivalry)	L 0–11		
October 15	at Yale	Yale Field; New Haven, CT	L 9–17		
October 22	Niagara	Syracuse, NY	W 52–4		
October 29	at Allegheny	Meadville, PA	W 69–0		
November 5	Manhattan College	Syracuse, NY	W 144–0		
November 12	at Lehigh	Bethlehem, PA	W 30–4		
November 19	at Army	The Plain; West Point, NY	L 5–21		
