= 1904 Holy Cross football team =

American college football season

1904 Holy Cross football
- Conference: Independent
- Record: 2–5–2
- Head coach: Frank Cavanaugh (2nd season)
- Captain: Timothy F. Larkin
- Home stadium: Holy Cross Field

1904 Eastern college football independents records
| | Conf. | | | Overall |
| Team | W | L | T | W | | L | | T |
|---|---|---|---|---|---|---|---|---|
| Penn | | – | | 12 | – | 0 | – | 0 |
| Western U. of Penn. | | – | | 10 | – | 0 | – | 0 |
| Dartmouth | | – | | 7 | – | 0 | – | 1 |
| Yale | | – | | 10 | – | 1 | – | 0 |
| Amherst | | – | | 9 | – | 1 | – | 0 |
| Colgate | | – | | 8 | – | 1 | – | 1 |
| Carlisle | | – | | 10 | – | 2 | – | 0 |
| Lafayette | | – | | 8 | – | 2 | – | 0 |
| Princeton | | – | | 8 | – | 2 | – | 0 |
| Army | | – | | 7 | – | 2 | – | 0 |
| Fordham | | – | | 4 | – | 1 | – | 1 |
| Harvard | | – | | 7 | – | 2 | – | 1 |
| Dickinson | | – | | 8 | – | 3 | – | 1 |
| Columbia | | – | | 7 | – | 3 | – | 0 |
| Cornell | | – | | 7 | – | 3 | – | 0 |
| Villanova | | – | | 4 | – | 2 | – | 1 |
| Syracuse | | – | | 6 | – | 3 | – | 0 |
| Swarthmore | | – | | 6 | – | 3 | – | 0 |
| Washington & Jefferson | | – | | 5 | – | 3 | – | 1 |
| Penn State | | – | | 6 | – | 4 | – | 0 |
| Temple | | – | | 3 | – | 2 | – | 0 |
| Brown | | – | | 6 | – | 5 | – | 0 |
| Bucknell | | – | | 3 | – | 3 | – | 0 |
| Springfield Training School | | – | | 4 | – | 4 | – | 1 |
| NYU | | – | | 3 | – | 6 | – | 0 |
| Holy Cross | | – | | 2 | – | 5 | – | 2 |
| Wesleyan | | – | | 3 | – | 7 | – | 0 |
| Geneva | | – | | 1 | – | 4 | – | 2 |
| Vermont | | – | | 1 | – | 5 | – | 2 |
| New Hampshire | | – | | 2 | – | 5 | – | 0 |
| Rutgers | | – | | 1 | – | 6 | – | 2 |
| Tufts | | – | | 2 | – | 9 | – | 1 |
| Lehigh | | – | | 1 | – | 8 | – | 0 |
| Frankin & Marshall | | – | | 0 | – | 10 | – | 0 |

The 1904 Holy Cross football team was an American football team that represented the College of the Holy Cross as an independent in the 1904 college football season.

In their second year under head coach Frank Cavanaugh, the team compiled a 2–5–2 record. Timothy F. Larkin was the team captain.

According to college records, Holy Cross played all of its home games at Holy Cross Field on the college campus in Worcester, Massachusetts. Contemporary reports suggest that one of the home games, a heavily hyped October 22 date with Dartmouth, may have been played at the team's former home stadium off campus, the Worcester Oval.

== Schedule ==
| Date | Opponent | Site | Result | Attendance | Source |
|---|---|---|---|---|---|
| September 28 | Massachusetts | Holy Cross Field; Worcester, MA | T 0–0 | | |
| October 1 | at Bates | Garcelon Field; Lewiston, ME | T 0–0 | | |
| October 5 | at Yale | Yale Field; New Haven, CT | L 0–23 | | |
| October 15 | Tufts | Holy Cross Field; Worcester, MA | W 34–0 | | |
| October 22 | Dartmouth | Worcester Oval; Worcester, MA | L 4–18 | 2,500 | |
| October 29 | vs. Georgetown | Columbia Park; Philadelphia, PA | L 4–17 | 5,000 | |
| November 5 | at Amherst | Pratt Field; Amherst, MA | L 6–40 | 2,500 | |
| November 12 | at Harvard | Harvard Stadium; Boston, MA | L 4–28 | 7,000 | |
| November 24 | Springfield Training School | Holy Cross Field; Worcester, MA | W 12–9 | | |
