= Robert Boyers (American football) =

American football player, coach, and US Army officer

Biographical details
- Born: December 25, 1876; Bellaire, Ohio, U.S.
- Died: August 4, 1949 (aged 72); Staten Island, New York, U.S.

Playing career
- 1899–1902: Army
- Position: Center

Coaching career (HC unless noted)
- 1904–1905: Army

Head coaching record
- Overall: 11–6–1

Accomplishments and honors

Awards
- Consensus All-American (1902)

Robert Emlen Boyers (December 25, 1876 – August 4, 1949) was a United States Army officer and American football player and coach. He served as the head football coach at the United States Military Academy from 1904 to 1905, compiling a record of 11–6–1. Boyers was born on December 25, 1876, and graduated from West Point in 1903. He served during World War I with the 3rd Infantry Division in France and with the 332nd Infantry Regiment in Italy. He lost his foot as the result of wounds and retired in 1919 with the rank of captain.

== Head coaching record ==
Year	Team	Overall	Conference	Standing	Bowl/playoffs
Army Cadets (Independent) (1904–1905)
1904	Army	7–2			
1905	Army	4–4–1			
Army:		11–6–1			
Total:		11–6–1			
