= 1904 Geneva Covenanters football team =

American college football season

1904 Geneva Covenanters football
- Conference: Independent
- Record: 1–4–2
- Head coach: Smith Alford (1st season)

1904 Eastern college football independents records
	Conf.			Overall
Team	W	L	T	W		L		T
Penn		–		12	–	0	–	0
Western U. of Penn.		–		10	–	0	–	0
Dartmouth		–		7	–	0	–	1
Yale		–		10	–	1	–	0
Amherst		–		9	–	1	–	0
Colgate		–		8	–	1	–	1
Carlisle		–		10	–	2	–	0
Lafayette		–		8	–	2	–	0
Princeton		–		8	–	2	–	0
Army		–		7	–	2	–	0
Fordham		–		4	–	1	–	1
Harvard		–		7	–	2	–	1
Dickinson		–		8	–	3	–	1
Columbia		–		7	–	3	–	0
Cornell		–		7	–	3	–	0
Villanova		–		4	–	2	–	1
Syracuse		–		6	–	3	–	0
Swarthmore		–		6	–	3	–	0
Washington & Jefferson		–		5	–	3	–	1
Penn State		–		6	–	4	–	0
Temple		–		3	–	2	–	0
Brown		–		6	–	5	–	0
Bucknell		–		3	–	3	–	0
Springfield Training School		–		4	–	4	–	1
NYU		–		3	–	6	–	0
Holy Cross		–		2	–	5	–	2
Wesleyan		–		3	–	7	–	0
Geneva		–		1	–	4	–	2
Vermont		–		1	–	5	–	2
New Hampshire		–		2	–	5	–	0
Rutgers		–		1	–	6	–	2
Tufts		–		2	–	9	–	1
Lehigh		–		1	–	8	–	0
Franklin & Marshall		–		0	–	10	–	0

he 1904 Geneva Covenanters football team was an American football team that represented Geneva College as an independent during the 1904 college football season. Led by Smith Alford in his first and only year as head coach, the team compiled a record of 1–4–2.

== Schedule ==
Date	Opponent	Site	Result	Attendance	Source
September 24	Salem A.C.	Beaver Falls, PA	T 0–0	400	
October 1	Westminster (PA)	Beaver Falls, PA	T 0–0		
October 8	Pittsburg Deaf Mutes	Beaver Falls, PA	W 45–0		
October 22	Western University of Pennsylvania	Beaver Falls, PA	L 0–30	1,200	
October 29	at Washington & Jefferson	Washington, PA	L 0–35		
November 5	at Allegheny	Meadville, PA	L 0–11		
November 19	at Penn State	Beaver Field; State College, PA	L 0–44		
