= Edgar Wrightington =

American football player and coach (1875–1945)

- Wrightington in 1904

Biographical details
- Born: July 30, 1875; Brookline, Massachusetts, U.S.
- Died: October 31, 1945 (aged 70); Salem, Massachusetts, U.S.

Playing career
- 1893–1896: Harvard
- Position: Halfback

Coaching career (HC unless noted)
- 1899: MIT
- 1904: Harvard

Head coaching record
- Overall: 7–2–1

Accomplishments and honors

Awards
- Consensus All-American (1896)

Edgar Newcomb Wrightington (July 30, 1875 – October 31, 1945) was an American college football player and coach.

== Early years ==
Wrightington was born in 1875 in Brookline, Massachusetts. He was the son of Charles Ward and Catherine Gouge (Schermerhron) Wrightington. He attended Brookline High School.

== Playing career ==
Wrightington attended Harvard University, where he played as a halfback for the Harvard Crimson from 1894 to 1896. He was selected to the 1896 College Football All-America Team.

== Coaching career ==
He served as the head football coach at the Massachusetts Institute of Technology in 1899 and later as Harvard's head football coach in 1904.

== Later years ==
Wrightington worked in real estate after graduating from Harvard. He later became business manager of Middlesex school in 1904. In 1905, he joined the Boston Consolidated Gas Company, holding positions as secretary, vice president and treasurer. During World War II, he directed training camps in New England. During the 1919 Boston police strike, he served with the Massachusetts Motor Corps. He later served as the treasurer of several gas and oil companies, including Beacon Oil Co., and as president and trustee of Brookline Savings Bank.

Wrightington was married to M. Theresa Hollander. He died in Salem, Massachusetts, in 1945 at age 70.

== Head coaching record ==
Year	Team	Overall	Conference	Standing	Bowl/playoffs
Harvard Crimson (Independent) (1904)
1904	Harvard	7–2–1			
Harvard:		7–2–1			
Total:		9–3			
