= Smith Alford =

American football player and coach (c. 1877–1949)

Biographical details
- Born: c. 1877
- Died: February 20, 1949; Flushing, New York, U.S.

Playing career

Football
- 1893–1896: Kentucky State College
- 1897: Washington and Lee

Baseball
- 1898: Washington and Lee
- Positions: Quarterback, halfback, fullback (football); Catcher (baseball)

Coaching career (HC unless noted)

Football
- 1896: Kentucky State College (assistant)
- 1904: Geneva
- c. 1920: Flushing HS (NY)

Head coaching record
- Overall: 1–4–2 (college)

Smith E. Alford (c. 1877 – February 20, 1949) was an American college football player and coach. He played football at Kentucky State College—now known as the University of Kentucky—from 1893 to 1896, playing quarterback and captaining the 1895 Kentucky State College Blue and White football team. The following year, he moved to halfback and was also an assistant coach for the team. In 1897, Alford moved on to Washington and Lee University to study law and played for Washington and Lee Generals football team. Alford served as the head football coach at Geneva College in Beaver Falls, Pennsylvania for one season, in 1904, compiling a record of 1–4–2.

Alford later coached football at Flushing High School in Flushing, New York. He was also a construction contractor in Queens. Alford died on February 20, 1949, in Flushing, New York.

== Head coaching record ==
=== College ===
Year	Team	Overall	Conference	Standing	Bowl/playoffs
Geneva Covenanters (Independent) (1904)
1904	Geneva	1–4–2			
Geneva:		1–4–2			
Total:		1–4–2			
