= 1904 Colgate football team =

American college football season

1904 Colgate football
- Conference: Independent
- Record: 8–1–1
- Head coach: Frank "Buck" O'Neill (2nd season)
- Captain: F. Gorham Brigham
- Home stadium: Whitnall Field

1904 Eastern college football independents records
| | Conf. | | | Overall |
| Team | W | L | T | W | | L | | T |
|---|---|---|---|---|---|---|---|---|
| Penn | | – | | 12 | – | 0 | – | 0 |
| Western U. of Penn. | | – | | 10 | – | 0 | – | 0 |
| Dartmouth | | – | | 7 | – | 0 | – | 1 |
| Yale | | – | | 10 | – | 1 | – | 0 |
| Amherst | | – | | 9 | – | 1 | – | 0 |
| Colgate | | – | | 8 | – | 1 | – | 1 |
| Carlisle | | – | | 10 | – | 2 | – | 0 |
| Lafayette | | – | | 8 | – | 2 | – | 0 |
| Princeton | | – | | 8 | – | 2 | – | 0 |
| Army | | – | | 7 | – | 2 | – | 0 |
| Fordham | | – | | 4 | – | 1 | – | 1 |
| Harvard | | – | | 7 | – | 2 | – | 1 |
| Dickinson | | – | | 8 | – | 3 | – | 1 |
| Columbia | | – | | 7 | – | 3 | – | 0 |
| Cornell | | – | | 7 | – | 3 | – | 0 |
| Villanova | | – | | 4 | – | 2 | – | 1 |
| Syracuse | | – | | 6 | – | 3 | – | 0 |
| Swarthmore | | – | | 6 | – | 3 | – | 0 |
| Washington & Jefferson | | – | | 5 | – | 3 | – | 1 |
| Penn State | | – | | 6 | – | 4 | – | 0 |
| Temple | | – | | 3 | – | 2 | – | 0 |
| Brown | | – | | 6 | – | 5 | – | 0 |
| Bucknell | | – | | 3 | – | 3 | – | 0 |
| Springfield Training School | | – | | 4 | – | 4 | – | 1 |
| NYU | | – | | 3 | – | 6 | – | 0 |
| Holy Cross | | – | | 2 | – | 5 | – | 2 |
| Wesleyan | | – | | 3 | – | 7 | – | 0 |
| Geneva | | – | | 1 | – | 4 | – | 2 |
| Vermont | | – | | 1 | – | 5 | – | 2 |
| New Hampshire | | – | | 2 | – | 5 | – | 0 |
| Rutgers | | – | | 1 | – | 6 | – | 2 |
| Tufts | | – | | 2 | – | 9 | – | 1 |
| Lehigh | | – | | 1 | – | 8 | – | 0 |
| Franklin & Marshall | | – | | 0 | – | 10 | – | 0 |

The 1904 Colgate football team was an American football team that represented Colgate University as an independent during the 1904 college football season. In its second season under head coach Buck O'Neill, the team compiled an 8–1–1 record. F. Gorham Brigham was the team captain. The team played its home games on Whitnall Field in Hamilton, New York.

== Schedule ==
| Date | Opponent | Site | Result | Source |
|---|---|---|---|---|
| September 28 | at Cornell | Percy Field; Ithaca, NY (rivalry) | L 0–17 | |
| October 1 | St. Lawrence | Whitnall Field; Hamilton, NY | W 29–0 | |
| October 8 | at Syracuse | Syracuse, NY (rivalry) | W 11–0 | |
| October 12 | Colgate Academy | Whitnall Field; Hamilton, NY | W 22–0 | |
| October 15 | at Watertown Athletic Association | Watertown, NY | T 0–0 | |
| October 19 | Hobart | Whitnall Field; Hamilton, NY | W 38–0 | |
| October 22 | Alfred | Whitnall Field; Hamilton, NY | W 76–0 | |
| October 29 | at Rochester | Culver Field; Rochester, NY | W 20–5 | |
| November 5 | at Williams | Weston Field; Williamstown, MA | W 6–0 | |
| November 12 | at Hamilton | Clinton, NY | W 66–2 | |
