= 1904 New Hampshire football team =

American college football season

1904 New Hampshire football
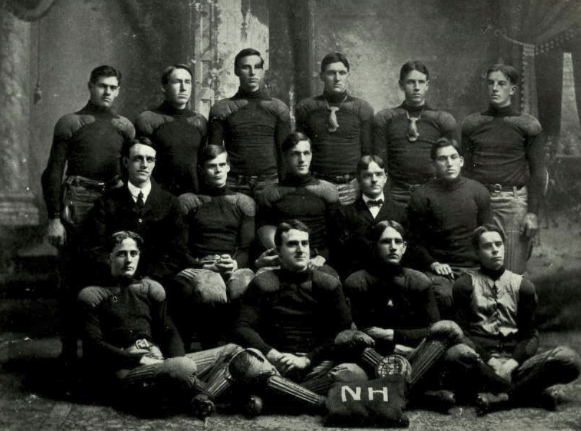
- Coach Ward at left end of middle row, team captain Pettee at center
- Conference: Independent
- Record: 2–5
- Head coach: G. B. Ward (1st season)
- Captain: Horace J. Pettee
- Home stadium: Central Park, Dover, NH

1904 Eastern college football independents records
	Conf.			Overall
Team	W	L	T	W		L		T
Penn		–		12	–	0	–	0
Western U. of Penn.		–		10	–	0	–	0
Dartmouth		–		7	–	0	–	1
Yale		–		10	–	1	–	0
Amherst		–		9	–	1	–	0
Colgate		–		8	–	1	–	1
Carlisle		–		10	–	2	–	0
Lafayette		–		8	–	2	–	0
Princeton		–		8	–	2	–	0
Army		–		7	–	2	–	0
Fordham		–		4	–	1	–	1
Harvard		–		7	–	2	–	1
Dickinson		–		8	–	3	–	1
Columbia		–		7	–	3	–	0
Cornell		–		7	–	3	–	0
Villanova		–		4	–	2	–	1
Syracuse		–		6	–	3	–	0
Swarthmore		–		6	–	3	–	0
Washington & Jefferson		–		5	–	3	–	1
Penn State		–		6	–	4	–	0
Temple		–		3	–	2	–	0
Brown		–		6	–	5	–	0
Bucknell		–		3	–	3	–	0
Springfield Training School		–		4	–	4	–	1
NYU		–		3	–	6	–	0
Holy Cross		–		2	–	5	–	2
Wesleyan		–		3	–	7	–	0
Geneva		–		1	–	4	–	2
Vermont		–		1	–	5	–	2
New Hampshire		–		2	–	5	–	0
Rutgers		–		1	–	6	–	2
Tufts		–		2	–	9	–	1
Lehigh		–		1	–	8	–	0
Franklin & Marshall		–		0	–	10	–	0

The 1904 New Hampshire football team (Note: The school did not adopt the Wildcats nickname until February 1926; before then, they were generally referred to as "the blue and white".) was an American football team that represented New Hampshire College of Agriculture and the Mechanic Arts (Note: The school was often referred to as New Hampshire College or New Hampshire State College in newspapers of the era.) during the 1904 college football season—the school became the University of New Hampshire in 1923. Under the direction of first-year head coach G. B. Ward, the team finished with a record of 2–5.

== Schedule ==
Scoring during this era awarded five points for a touchdown, one point for a conversion kick (extra point), and four points for a field goal. (Note: Prior to the 1904 season, a field goal was worth 5 points.) Teams played in the one-platoon system and the forward pass was not yet legal. Games were played in two halves rather than four quarters.

Date	Opponent	Site	Result	Attendance	Source
September 21 (Note: New Hampshire's media guide lists this game as being played in November, but contemporary sources are clear that it was played in September.)	at Exeter Academy	Exeter, NH	L 0–15		
September 24	at Bates	Garcelon Field; Lewiston, ME	L 0–6	400	
September 28	at Tufts	Tufts Oval; Medford, MA	W 4–0		
October 1	at Andover Academy	Brothers Field; Andover, MA	L 0–16		
October 8	at Colby	Waterville, ME	L 0–23		
October 15	at Maine	Orono, ME (rivalry)	L 0–6		
October 22	Worcester Tech	Central Park; Dover, NH	W 18–4	300	

This was the final season that New Hampshire faced Exeter Academy and Andover Academy.

The New Hampshire College Monthly reported that Carl T. Fuller scored New Hampshire's first-ever points from drop kick in the Tufts game.

New Hampshire's second team (reserves) defeated the second team of Portsmouth's Maplewood Athletic Club, 22–0, and defeated Thornton Academy in Saco, Maine, 5–0. The sophomore team (class of 1907) defeated Sanborn Seminary in Kingston, 11–0.

An end-of-season banquet was held in neighboring Newmarket on October 26; 13 players were awarded varsity letters. The College Monthly noted that the average weight of players on the team was 153.538 pounds (69.644 kg).

== Roster ==
The team photo consists of all 13 lettermen, plus head coach Ward and the student team manager. Two of the players in the back row have nose armor around their necks.

Name	Position	Class	Team photo location
Arthur M. Batchelder	Quarterback	1908	Front row, far left
Willis C. Campbell	Guard	1906	Back row, second from left
John H. Chesley	Center	1905	Front row, second from left
Charles F. Cone	Halfback	1908	Front row, second from right
Carl T. Fuller	Tackle	1906	Back row, third from left
Edwin D. Hardy	End	1906	Middle row, second from left
Cyrus F. Jenness	Tackle	1906	Back row, third from right
Thomas J. Leonard	End	1908	Middle row, far right
Joseph W. Moreton	Halfback	1905	Front row, far right
Orlo D. Mudgett	Team manager	1905	Middle row, second from right
Horace J. Pettee (captain)	Halfback	1905	Middle row, center
Elmer S. Savage	Right guard	1905	Back row, second from right
Franklin E. Stockwell	Fullback	1907	Back row, far right
Frank A. Tinkham	Guard	1905	Back row, far left
George B. Ward	Head coach	n/a	Middle row, far left
