= 1904 Vermont Green and Gold football team =

American college football season

1904 Vermont Green and Gold football
- Conference: Independent
- Record: 1–5–2
- Head coach: Harry Howard Cloudman (3rd season)
- Home stadium: Athletic Park

1904 Eastern college football independents records
	Conf.			Overall
Team	W	L	T	W		L		T
Penn		–		12	–	0	–	0
Western U. of Penn.		–		10	–	0	–	0
Dartmouth		–		7	–	0	–	1
Yale		–		10	–	1	–	0
Amherst		–		9	–	1	–	0
Colgate		–		8	–	1	–	1
Carlisle		–		10	–	2	–	0
Lafayette		–		8	–	2	–	0
Princeton		–		8	–	2	–	0
Army		–		7	–	2	–	0
Fordham		–		4	–	1	–	1
Harvard		–		7	–	2	–	1
Dickinson		–		8	–	3	–	1
Columbia		–		7	–	3	–	0
Cornell		–		7	–	3	–	0
Villanova		–		4	–	2	–	1
Syracuse		–		6	–	3	–	0
Swarthmore		–		6	–	3	–	0
Washington & Jefferson		–		5	–	3	–	1
Penn State		–		6	–	4	–	0
Temple		–		3	–	2	–	0
Brown		–		6	–	5	–	0
Bucknell		–		3	–	3	–	0
Springfield Training School		–		4	–	4	–	1
NYU		–		3	–	6	–	0
Holy Cross		–		2	–	5	–	2
Wesleyan		–		3	–	7	–	0
Geneva		–		1	–	4	–	2
Vermont		–		1	–	5	–	2
New Hampshire		–		2	–	5	–	0
Rutgers		–		1	–	6	–	2
Tufts		–		2	–	9	–	1
Lehigh		–		1	–	8	–	0
Franklin & Marshall		–		0	–	10	–	0

The 1904 Vermont Green and Gold football team was an American football team that represented the University of Vermont as an independent during the 1904 college football season. In their third year under head coach Harry Howard Cloudman, the team compiled a 1–5–2 record.

== Schedule ==
Date	Opponent	Site	Result	Source
October 8	at Dartmouth	Alumni Oval; Hanover, NH	L 0–37	
October 15	St. Lawrence	Athletic Park; Burlington, VT	W 10–0	
October 22	Tufts	Athletic Park; Burlington, VT	T 6–6	
October 26	Norwich	Athletic Park; Burlington, VT	L 0–15	
October 29	at Brown	Andrews Field; Providence, RI	L 0–33	
November 1	at St. Lawrence	Canton, NY	T 0–0	
November 5	at Wesleyan	Andrus Field; Middletown, CT	L 0–23	
November 12	at Williams	Weston Field; Williamstown, MA	L 11–73	
