= 1904 Washington & Jefferson Red and Black football team =

American college football season

1904 Washington & Jefferson Red and Black football
- Conference: Independent
- Record: 5–3–1
- Head coach: William B. Seaman (3rd season)
- Captain: Gibson
- Home stadium: College Park

1904 Eastern college football independents records
| | Conf. | | | Overall |
| Team | W | L | T | W | | L | | T |
|---|---|---|---|---|---|---|---|---|
| Penn | | – | | 12 | – | 0 | – | 0 |
| Western U. of Penn. | | – | | 10 | – | 0 | – | 0 |
| Dartmouth | | – | | 7 | – | 0 | – | 1 |
| Yale | | – | | 10 | – | 1 | – | 0 |
| Amherst | | – | | 9 | – | 1 | – | 0 |
| Colgate | | – | | 8 | – | 1 | – | 1 |
| Carlisle | | – | | 10 | – | 2 | – | 0 |
| Lafayette | | – | | 8 | – | 2 | – | 0 |
| Princeton | | – | | 8 | – | 2 | – | 0 |
| Army | | – | | 7 | – | 2 | – | 0 |
| Fordham | | – | | 4 | – | 1 | – | 1 |
| Harvard | | – | | 7 | – | 2 | – | 1 |
| Dickinson | | – | | 8 | – | 3 | – | 1 |
| Columbia | | – | | 7 | – | 3 | – | 0 |
| Cornell | | – | | 7 | – | 3 | – | 0 |
| Villanova | | – | | 4 | – | 2 | – | 1 |
| Syracuse | | – | | 6 | – | 3 | – | 0 |
| Swarthmore | | – | | 6 | – | 3 | – | 0 |
| Washington & Jefferson | | – | | 5 | – | 3 | – | 1 |
| Penn State | | – | | 6 | – | 4 | – | 0 |
| Temple | | – | | 3 | – | 2 | – | 0 |
| Brown | | – | | 6 | – | 5 | – | 0 |
| Bucknell | | – | | 3 | – | 3 | – | 0 |
| Springfield Training School | | – | | 4 | – | 4 | – | 1 |
| NYU | | – | | 3 | – | 6 | – | 0 |
| Holy Cross | | – | | 2 | – | 5 | – | 2 |
| Wesleyan | | – | | 3 | – | 7 | – | 0 |
| Geneva | | – | | 1 | – | 4 | – | 2 |
| Vermont | | – | | 1 | – | 5 | – | 2 |
| New Hampshire | | – | | 2 | – | 5 | – | 0 |
| Rutgers | | – | | 1 | – | 6 | – | 2 |
| Tufts | | – | | 2 | – | 9 | – | 1 |
| Lehigh | | – | | 1 | – | 8 | – | 0 |
| Franklin & Marshall | | – | | 0 | – | 10 | – | 0 |

The 1904 Washington & Jefferson football team was an American football team that represented Washington & Jefferson College as an independent during the 1904 college football season. Led by third-year head coach William B. Seaman, the team compiled a record of 5–3–1.

== Schedule ==
| Date | Opponent | Site | Result | Attendance | Source |
|---|---|---|---|---|---|
| October 1 | Marietta | Washington, PA | W 29–0 | | |
| October 8 | at Princeton | University Field; Princeton, NJ | L 0–16 | | |
| October 15 | California Normal (PA) | Washington, PA | W 6–0 | | |
| October 22 | vs. Penn State | Exposition Park; Pittsburgh, PA | L 0–12 | 4,100 | |
| October 29 | Geneva | Washington, PA | W 35–0 | | |
| November 8 | at Pittsburgh Lyceum | Pittsburgh College campus; Pittsburgh, PA | W 6–0 | 3,000 | |
| November 12 | at Ohio Medical | Neil Park; Columbus, OH | T 6–6 | | |
| November 19 | Waynesburg | Washington, PA | W 83–0 | | |
| November 24 | at Dickinson | College Park; Carlisle, PA | L 6–10 | | |
