= 1904 Western University of Pennsylvania football team =

American college football season

1904 Western University of Pennsylvania football
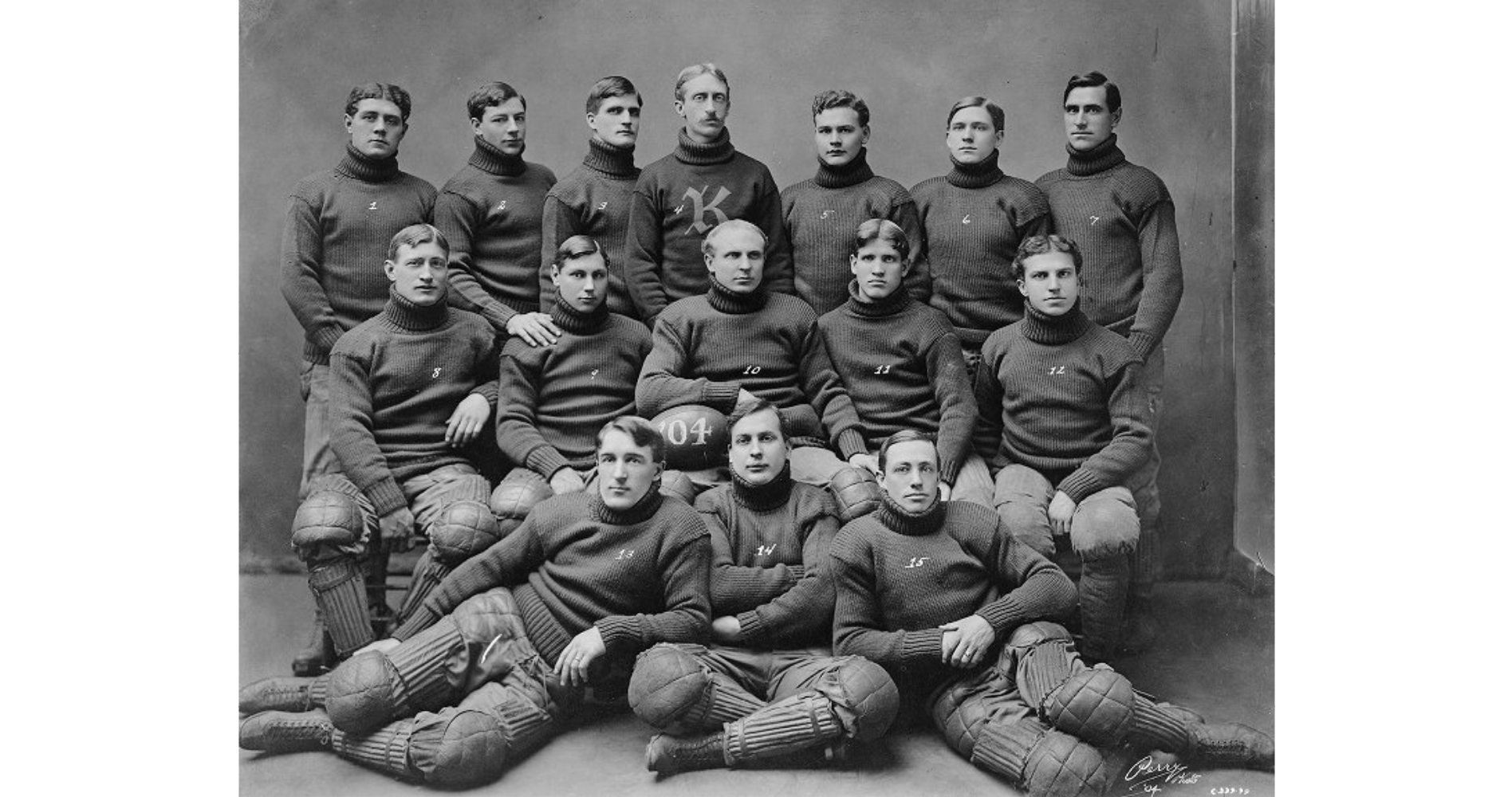
- Conference: Independent
- Record: 10–0
- Head coach: Arthur Mosse (2nd season)
- Captain: Joseph H. Thompson
- Home stadium: Exposition Park

1904 Eastern college football independents records
	Conf.			Overall
Team	W	L	T	W		L		T
Penn		–		12	–	0	–	0
Western U. of Penn.		–		10	–	0	–	0
Dartmouth		–		7	–	0	–	1
Yale		–		10	–	1	–	0
Amherst		–		9	–	1	–	0
Colgate		–		8	–	1	–	1
Carlisle		–		10	–	2	–	0
Lafayette		–		8	–	2	–	0
Princeton		–		8	–	2	–	0
Army		–		7	–	2	–	0
Fordham		–		4	–	1	–	1
Harvard		–		7	–	2	–	1
Dickinson		–		8	–	3	–	1
Columbia		–		7	–	3	–	0
Cornell		–		7	–	3	–	0
Villanova		–		4	–	2	–	1
Syracuse		–		6	–	3	–	0
Swarthmore		–		6	–	3	–	0
Washington & Jefferson		–		5	–	3	–	1
Penn State		–		6	–	4	–	0
Temple		–		3	–	2	–	0
Brown		–		6	–	5	–	0
Bucknell		–		3	–	3	–	0
Springfield Training School		–		4	–	4	–	1
NYU		–		3	–	6	–	0
Holy Cross		–		2	–	5	–	2
Wesleyan		–		3	–	7	–	0
Geneva		–		1	–	4	–	2
Vermont		–		1	–	5	–	2
New Hampshire		–		2	–	5	–	0
Rutgers		–		1	–	6	–	2
Tufts		–		2	–	9	–	1
Lehigh		–		1	–	8	–	0
Franklin & Marshall		–		0	–	10	–	0

The 1904 Western University of Pennsylvania football team was an American football team that represented Western University of Pennsylvania (later renamed the University of Pittsburgh) as an independent during the 1904 college football season.

== Schedule ==
Date	Opponent	Site	Result	Attendance	Source
October 1	Grove City	Exposition Park; Pittsburgh, PA	W 12–0	1,500	
October 11	Mount Union	Exposition Park; Pittsburgh, PA	W 67–0	2,000	
October 15	Westminster (PA)	Exposition Park; Pittsburgh, PA	W 38–0	2,500	
October 22	at Geneva	Beaver Falls, PA	W 30–0	1,200	
October 26	Susquehanna	Exposition Park; Pittsburgh, PA	W 40–0	750	
October 29	California State Normal (PA)	Exposition Park; Pittsburgh, PA	W 40–0	3,200	
November 5	Waynesburg	Exposition Park; Pittsburgh, PA	W 83–0	1,000	
November 8	West Virginia	Exposition Park; Pittsburgh, PA (rivalry)	W 53–0	4,000	
November 19	Bethany (WV)	Exposition Park; Pittsburgh, PA	W 21–0	750	
November 24	Penn State	Exposition Park; Pittsburgh, PA (rivalry)	W 22–5	8,500	

== Season recap ==
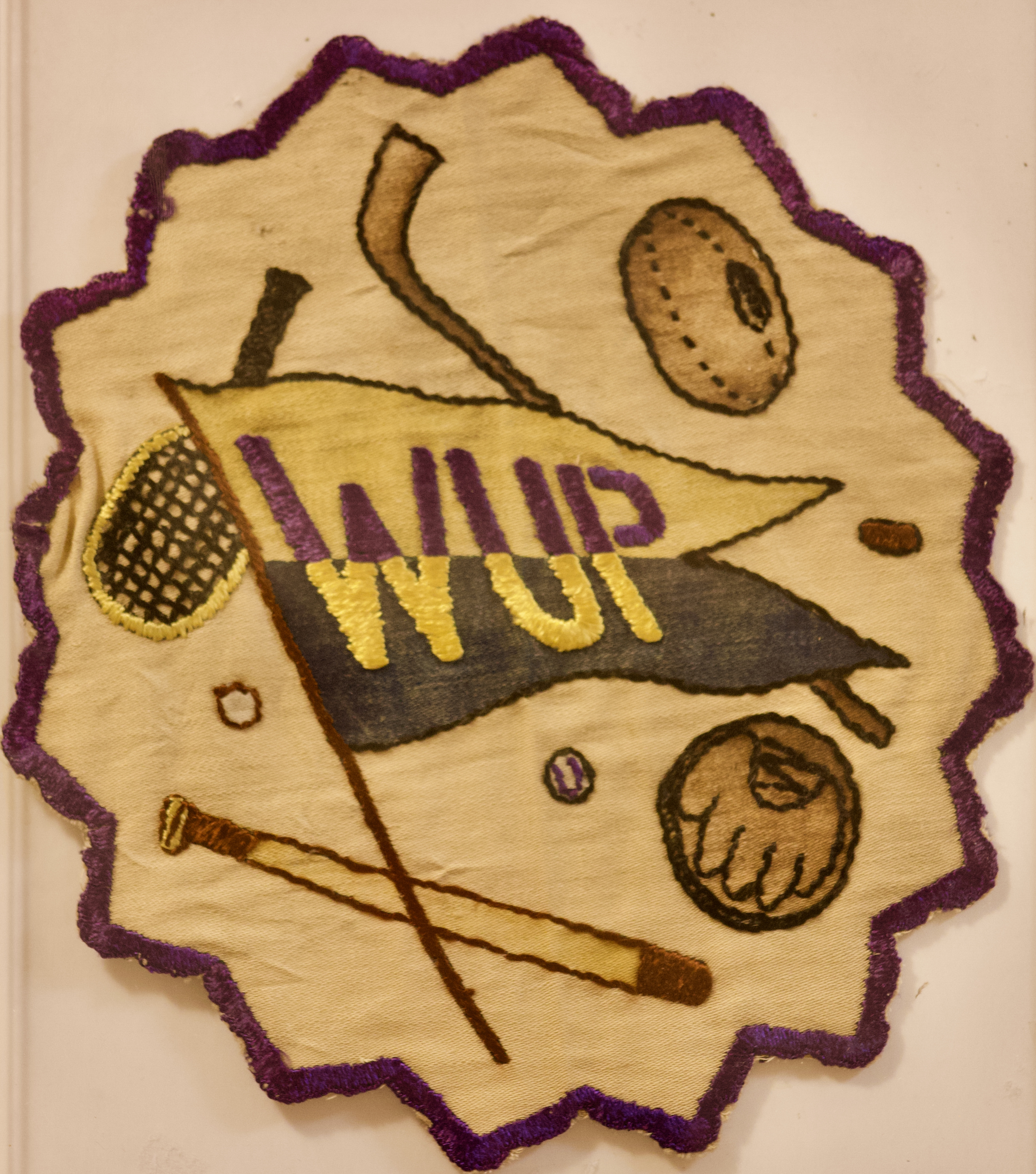
WUP Patch

The alumni of the Western University of Pennsylvania realized they needed to organize an Athletic Association to reverse the state of athletics at the school. WUP was determined that the 1904 football season would not be a replay of 1903. On December 7 a formal group was established and the elected executive committee members pledged to raise money to place a winning football team on the field. Coach Mosse agreed to coach the team. His vision was to have at the least an athletic dorm and training table for the players. The Association promised to raise two thousand dollars and on December 16 executive committee member Samuel Hunter presented the plan to the Collegiate and Engineering students. He also suggested that the students contribute by adding a five dollar fee to their tuition. The initial money would benefit the football program until it was turning a profit and then the money would benefit all the sports. The student response was positive. The new Chancellor Samuel B. McCormick and the faculty were supportive. Pirate owner, Barney Dreyfuss leased the use of Exposition Park for the home games for a percentage of the gate. While the alumni and students were raising money, Coach Mosse was actively recruiting some college football veterans. When school opened in the fall the following players were enrolled in the university and competing for positions on the team: Henry Boisseau and Leslie Waddill from Missouri State Normal; Omar Mehl from Washburn College; Joe Thompson, Joe Edgar, Jud Schmidt, Arthur McKean and Walter East from Geneva College; Theodore Perry from State College; and Walter Ritchie from Illinois Wesleyan. Coach Mosse and Manager Charles Gans managed to put together a ten-game schedule that only had one road game. The Western University hired Frank Hinkey to assist Coach Mosse in late October. The ex-Yale captain was the line coach for two weeks. The culmination of all this hard work by the Administration, Alumni Assn., students, and head coach Arthur Mosse was winning the unofficial 1904 Football Championship of Western Pennsylvania. In its second season under head coach Arthur Mosse, the team compiled a 10–0 record, shut out nine of its opponents, and outscored all opponents by a total of 406 to 5.

Notably, 1904 marked the first season where WUP/Pitt, Penn State, and West Virginia played a full round robin. Thus, 1904 marked the first season of the Big Three championship.

== Coaching staff ==
1904 WUP football staff
Coaching staff: Arthur St. Leger Mosse – Head coach; Frank Hinkey – Assistant line coach	Support staff: Charles Gans – Graduate manager of athletics

== Roster ==
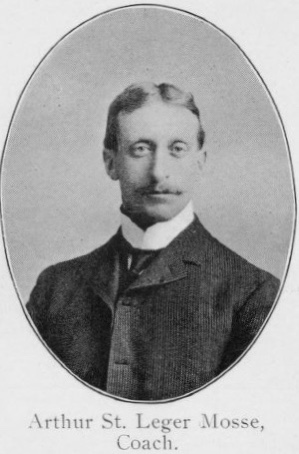
Coach Arthur St. Leger Mosse

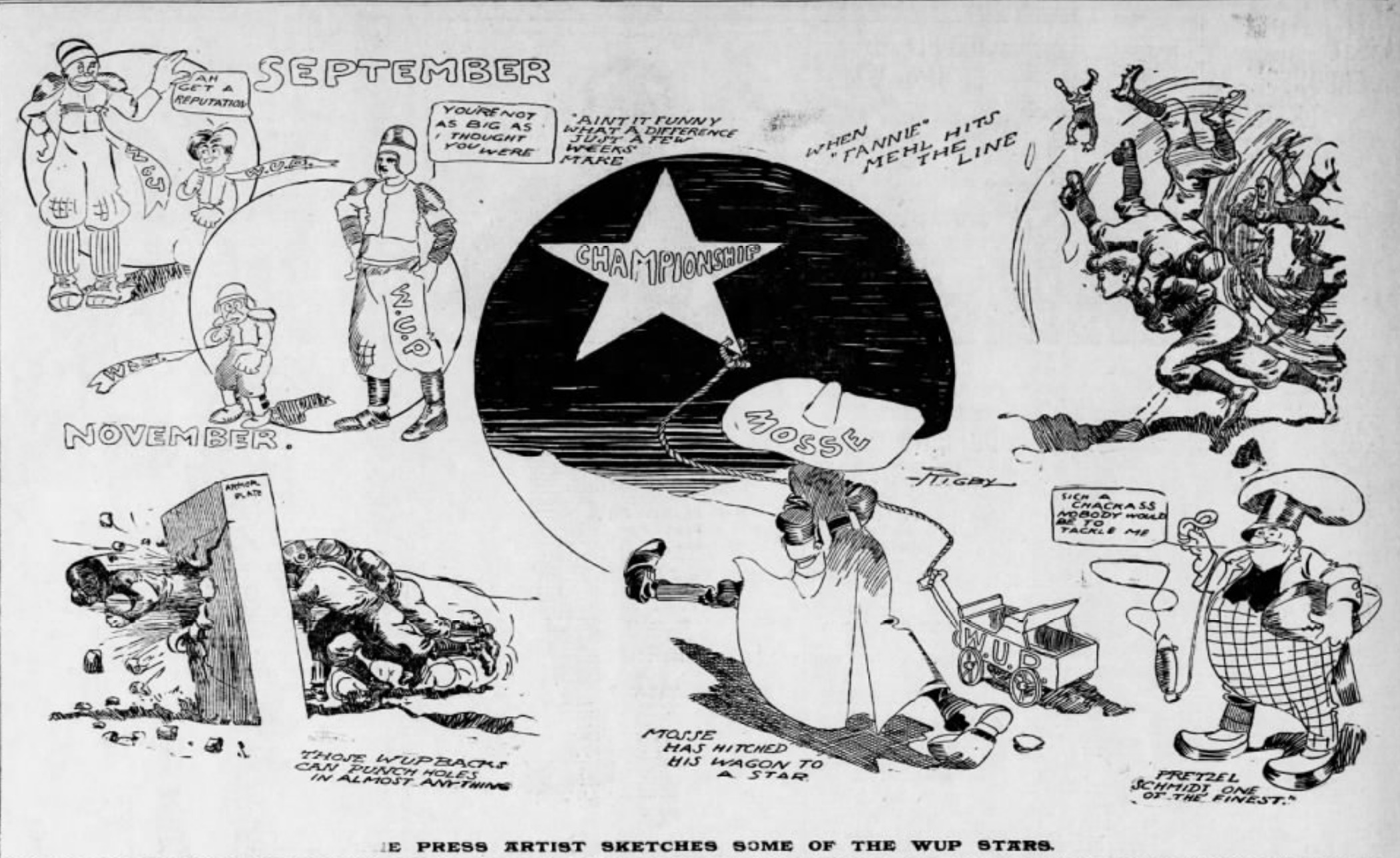
Beware the WUPs

1904 Western University of Pennsylvania football roster
Player	Position	Games	Height	Weight	Class	Prep School	Degree	Residence
Theodore Perry	end	9	5' 8"	168	1907	State College	Associate Dental	Pierre, SD
Gilbert Miller	tackle	2	5' 11"	176	1906	Butler H.S.	Associate Engineering	
Leslie Waddill	tackle	9	6' 2"	178	1907	Warrensburg Normal (MO)	Doctor of Dental Surgery	Pittsburgh, PA
Waldemar Zieg	guard	10	5' 10"	182	1913	Allegheny H. S.	Engineer of Mines	Pittsburgh, PA
Arthur McKean	center	7	6' 1"	175	1905	Geneva College	Bachelor of Arts/ Law School	Beaver Falls, PA
Curt Leidenroth	center	9	5' 11"	180	1906	Allegheny H.S.	Doctor of Dental Surgery	Bellevue, PA
Joseph Edgar	guard	9	6'	178	1908	Geneva College	Doctor of Medicine	Oakmont, PA
James O'Sullivan	guard	2	6'	170	1906	Pittsburg College	Pittsburgh, PA	
Calvin Marshall	tackle	9	6'	187	1908	Gloucester H.S. (MA)	Doctor of Medicine	Mt. Oliver, PA
Walter East	end	8	5' 10"	170	1906	Geneva College		
Walter Ritchie	quarterback	9	5' 6"	145	1907	Bloomington Prep, (IL)	Doctor of Dental Surgery	Bloomington, IL
Charles H. Boisseau	quarterback	7	5' 7"	151	1907	Warrensburg Normal (MO)	Doctor of Dental Surgery	
Joe Thompson	halfback	8	5' 8"	178	1908	Geneva College	Bachelor of Arts and Law Degree	Beaver Falls, PA
Charles Springer	halfback	4	5' 10"	168	1908	Dean Academy	Associate Engineering	Pittsburgh, PA
Albert Schmidt	halfback	8	5' 8"	180	1908	Pittsburgh H.S.	Doctor of Medicine	Turtle Creek, PA
Omar Mehl	fullback	8	5' 7"	163	1908	Topeka H.S. (KS)	Doctor of Medicine	Braddock, PA
Frank Righter	tackle	3	5' 10"	166	1907		Doctor of Medicine	Richmond, VA
Frank Rugh	quarterback	6	5' 6"	153	1904	Pittsburgh Academy	Associate Law	Pittsburgh, PA
Welday Elliott	tackle	5	6' 5"	179	1907	Westminster	Mechanical Engineer	Pittsburgh, PA
Thomas Crea	end	2	5' 6"	140	1905	Park College	Civil Engineer	Greenville, PA
William Broadhurst	end	0	5' 8"	150	1908		Doctor of Medicine	Tyre, PA
Edward Trax	end	1	5' 8"	153	1906	Tri-State Normal	Bachelor of Science	McKeesport, PA
James I. McCormick	halfback	5	5' 6"	166	1906	Coe College (IA)	Associate College degree	
Schwartz	guard	4	5' 6"	172		Thiel College		
Charles Rosser	halfback	1			1904		Electrical Engineering	Bellaire, OH

== Game summaries ==
=== Grove City ===
Grove City at WUP

Team	1	2	Total
Grove City	0	0	0
• WUP	6	6	12

- Date: October 1, 1904
- Location: Exposition Park
  Pittsburgh, PA
- Game attendance: 1,500
- Referee: Harry Fry (P.A.C.)

On October 1, Grove City College visited Exposition Park to play the 1904 Western University of Pennsylvania football team. More than 1500 spectators ventured to the stadium for the opening game of the season. The engineering and collegiate students were in school and attended in force. Edwin McKee of the engineering department led the cheering section. Grove City received the opening kick and moved the ball against the WUP defense for two first downs and then turned the ball over on downs. The WUP offense showed its potential as Jud Schmidt, Joe Thompson and Omar Mehl moved the ball to the thirty-five-yard line. On the next play, Thompson scampered around left end behind the blocking of Mehl and Schmidt for a touchdown. Joe Edgar kicked the goal after and the score was 6–0 in favor of WUP. After an exchange of possessions the WUP offense again had the ball deep in Grove City territory but were unable to score and the first half ended 6–0. In the second half, Grove City had the ball on offense for only three downs. Joe Thompson scored a touchdown from five yards out on the WUP's second possession. Edgar was good again on the point after. The formidable WUP offense advanced the ball to the Grove City ten yard line as time was called with the final score WUP 12 – Grove City 0. The WUP lineup for the game against Grove City was Theodore Perry (left end), Leslie Waddill (left tackle), Waldy Zieg (left guard), Arthur McKean (center), Joe Edgar (right guard), Calvin Marshall (right tackle), Henry Boisseau (right end), Frank Rugh (quarterback), Joe Thompson (left halfback), Jud Schmidt (right halfback) and Omar Mehl (fullback). Substitutions during the game were: Walter Ritchie replaced Frank Rugh at quarterback; and Walter East replaced Henry Boisseau at right end. The game consisted of one twenty-minute half and one fifteen-minute half.

=== Mount Union ===
Mount Union at Pitt

Team	1	2	Total
Mount Union	0	0	0
• Pitt	37	30	67

- Date: October 11, 1904
- Location: Exposition Park
  Pittsburgh, PA
- Game attendance: 2,000
- Referee: Dr. Farrar (U. of Pennsylvania)

The Purple of Mount Union College were the opponents on October 11. The pomp surrounding the student body cheering was more impressive than the game itself. All students were attending classes and had football fever. A large contingent of students led by a brass band marched into the stadium. The medical students mounted a skeleton on a donkey and he was the star of the parade. At halftime, the students serenaded the players with “Hail, Hail, the Gang's all Here”. The WUP offense scored twelve touchdowns. The Mount Union eleven was totally outmanned. Captain Joe Thompson played substitutes for the second half and backfield subs Rosser and Springer each scored two touchdowns. The only negative was that Joe Edgar missed five goal kicks. The WUPs won the game 67–0 to the delight of about two thousand fans. The WUP lineup for the game against Mount Union was Theodore Perry (left end), Leslie Waddill (left tackle), Waldy Zieg (left guard), Arthur McKean (center), Joe Edgar (right guard), Calvin Marshall (right tackle), Walter East (right end), Frank Rugh (quarterback), Joe Thompson (left halfback), Jud Schmidt (right halfback) and Omar Mehl (fullback). Substitutions during the game were: Walter Ritchie replaced Henry Boisseau at quarterback; Curt Leidenroth replaced Waldy Zeig at left guard; Rosser replaced Jud Schmidt at right halfback; Charles Springer replaced Omar Mehl at fullback; William Elliott replaced Calvin Marshall at right tackle; and Thomas Crea replaced Theodore Perry at left end. The game consisted of twenty-minute halves.

=== Westminster ===
Westminster at Pitt

Team	1	2	Total
Westminster	0	0	0
• Pitt	15	23	38

- Date: October 15, 1904
- Location: Exposition Park
  Pittsburgh, PA
- Game attendance: 2,500
- Referee: Harry Fry (P.A.C.)

As in previous years, the game on October 15 against Westminster College drew a large crowd of about twenty-five hundred raucous fans to Exposition Park. Similarly to the game four days prior, the WUP offense dominated the game. The WUP offense scored seven unanswered touchdowns. Joe Thompson scored three, Omar Mehl scored two (one on a one hundred yard dash) and Calvin Marshall and Jud Schmidt each scored one. One paragraph in the Pittsburgh Press aptly recapped the action:

The best play of the day occurred about the middle of the second half. Locke had kicked off to Schmidt on the 10-yard line where he was downed without a gain. On the next play, Mehl broke through the left side of the line, and ran 100 yards for a touchdown. The work of the entire W. U. P. team was good, but that of Joe Thompson, "Jud" Schmidt, Mehl and Perry was splendid. Thompson scored three of the touchdowns, and only once did Schmidt fail to gain when given the ball. Ritchie handled the team in good shape.

Joe Edgar was successful on only three of seven goal kicks. The final score read 38–0. The WUP lineup for the game against Westminster was Theodore Perry (left end), Leslie Waddill (left tackle), Curt Leidenroth (left guard), Arthur McKean (center), Joe Edgar (right guard), Calvin Marshall (right tackle), Walter East (right end), Walter Ritchie (quarterback), Joe Thompson (left halfback), Jud Schmidt (right halfback) and Omar Mehl (fullback). Waldy Zieg replaced Curt Leidenroth at left guard for the second half. The game consisted of twenty-minute halves.

=== At Geneva ===
Pitt at Geneva

Team	1	2	Total
Pitt	0	0	0
• Pitt	18	12	30

- Date: October 22, 1904
- Location: Beaver Fairgrounds
  Beaver Falls, PA
- Game attendance: 1,200
- Referee: Harry Fry (P.A.C.)

The trip to Beaver Falls, Pennsylvania on 22 October to do battle with the Covenanters of Geneva College was the only road game of the season for the Universities. The Pittsburg Press summed up the action best:

"Although there was little brilliant playing on either side, this resulted from the fact that WUP did not need to exert herself, and Geneva was unable to do so. WUP had by far the superior team work, and showed far greater experience."

The starting lineup for the WUP eleven had three players who were the stars of the strong 1902 and 1903 Geneva teams: Joe Thompson, Joe Edgar and Jud Schmidt. The twelve hundred fans cheered hard for the Covenanters but this WUP contingent was too strong. Joe Thompson and Omar Mehl each scored two touchdowns and Jud Schmidt added another. Joe Edgar was successful on all five goal kicks to make the final score 30–0. Since the Genevans were not congenial hosts and treated both the WUP fans and team poorly, the second half was cut short nine minutes by Captain Thompson. The WUP starting lineup for the game against Geneva was Theodore Perry (left end), Leslie Waddill (left tackle), Waldy Zieg (left guard), Curt Leidenroth (center), Joe Edgar (right guard), Calvin Marshall (right tackle), Henry Boisseau (right end), Walter Ritchie (quarterback), Joe Thompson (left halfback), Jud Schmidt (right halfback) and Omar Mehl (fullback). The game consisted of one twenty-five minute half and one sixteen-minute half.

=== Susquehanna ===
Susquehanna at Pitt

Team	1	2	Total
Susquehanna	0	0	0
• Pitt	12	28	40

- Date: October 26, 1904
- Location: Exposition Park
  Pittsburgh, PA
- Game attendance: 750
- Referee: Harry Fry (P.A.C.)

The weekday game with Susquehanna University drew mostly students. The WUP eleven were too strong offensively and easily scored forty points. The River Hawks made three first downs in the first half. They fooled the WUP defense with a fake punt for a sizable gain, but the WUP defense stiffened and kept their shutout streak intact. Joe Thompsom, Omar Mehl, and Jud Schmidt scored touchdowns. Substitutions were made at halftime and the Chancellor's son James McCormick relieved Schmidt at halfback. His first carry resulted in a fifty-yard touchdown scamper. Late in the game Walter East also scored from midfield to the delight of the fans. The only disappointment of the day was the faculty at the Pennsylvania College for Women refused to allow their ladies to accept the invitation to attend the game. The Pittsburgh Gazette reported:

"The crowd was small, the W.U.P. students forming the large part of it. The 200 girls from the Pennsylvania College for Women did not appear, and there was a disappointed crowd of boys, who wanted to "get a look at them" as one put it. The faculty vetoed their going, and the ladies were real angry. A note was sent by them, stating why they were not at the game, but promised they would accept the invitation for Thanksgiving when W.U.P. will play State."

The WUP lineup for the game against Susquehanna was Theodore Perry (left end), Leslie Waddill (left tackle), Waldy Zieg (left guard), Arthur McKean (center), Joe Edgar (right guard), Calvin Marshall (right tackle), Walter East (right end), Walter Ritchie (quarterback), Joe Thompson (left halfback), Jud Schmidt (right halfback) and Omar Mehl (fullback). Substitutions made during the game were: Curt Leidenroth replaced Waldy Zeig at left guard; Schwartz replaced Joe Edgar at right guard; William Elliott replaced Calvin Marshall at right tackle; Frank Rugh replaced Walter Ritchie at quarterback; Charles Springer replaced Joe Thompson at left halfback; and James McCormick replaced Jud Schmidt at right halfback. The game consisted of twenty-minute halves.

=== California State Normal ===
California Normal at Pitt

Team	1	2	Total
California Normal	0	0	0
• Pitt	23	17	40

- Date: October 26, 1904
- Location: Exposition Park
  Pittsburgh, PA
- Game attendance: 3,200
- Referee: Harry Fry (P.A.C.)

In spite of rumors that the Normal lineup might have some players not registered as students, coach Mosse was looking forward to playing the game so he could gauge his team for the upcoming West Virginia and State College tussles. WUP Chancellor McCormick wanted assurance that, in fact, the players were students and formally protested any nonstudent playing. H.W. Harmon, Director of Athletics at California State Normal, assured him that their lineup would be students. The pregame drama was all for naught as the WUP eleven steamrolled the Blaze 40–0 in front of thirty-two hundred noisy spectators. On the first play from scrimmage Smith, the star back of Normal, raced for a twenty-yard gain but broke his wrist while being tackled. The Normal eleven were stunned and the WUP offense proceeded to score four first-half touchdowns and led 23–0 at halftime. The WUPs scored three more touchdowns in the second half and substitutes received plenty of playing time. The WUP lineup for the game against California Normal was Theodore Perry (left end), Leslie Waddill (left tackle), Waldy Zieg (left guard), Arthur McKean (center), Joe Edgar (right guard), Calvin Marshall (right tackle), Walter East (right end), Frank Rugh (quarterback), Joe Thompson (left halfback), Jud Schmidt (right halfback) and Omar Mehl (fullback). Substitutions made during the game were: Curt Leidenroth replaced Arthur McKean at center; Schwartz replaced Waldy Zeig at left guard; William Elliott replaced Leslie Waddill at right tackle; Henry Boisseau replaced Walter East at right end; Charles Springer replaced Joe Thompson at left halfback; and James McCormick replaced Jud Schmidt at right halfback. The game consisted of twenty-minute halves.

=== Waynesburg ===
Waynesburg at Pitt

Team	1	2	Total
Waynesburg	0	0	0
• Pitt	40	43	83

- Date: November 5, 1904
- Location: Exposition Park
  Pittsburgh, PA
- Game attendance: 1,000
- Referee: Harry Fry (P.A.C.)

On a rainy November 5 the winless Waynesburg Yellow Jackets played a twenty-minute first half and fifteen minute second half against the second string of the unbeaten WUP juggernaut. Coach Mosse was resting his starters for the West Virginia game. The WUP scrubs were so excited they scored fourteen touchdowns - Charles Springer led the way with four; James McCormick scored three; Walter Ritchie and Henry Boisseau each scored two; and Frank Righter, Ted Perry and Waldy Zeig each scored one. Waynesburg made one first down and defensively could not stop the WUP offensive machine. The one thousand WUP rooters who ventured to Exposition Park were treated to an impressive offensive display. The final score was 83–0. In the second half WUP halfback Charles Springer broke his shoulder and was out for the rest of the season. The WUP lineup for the game against Waynesburg was Thomas Crea (left end), Frank Righter (left tackle), John Sullivan (left guard), Curt Leidenroth (center), Joe Edgar (right guard), Elliott (right tackle), Walter Ritchie (right end), Henry Boisseau (quarterback), Charles Springer (left halfback), James McCormick (right halfback) and Gilbert Miller (fullback). Substitutions during the game were: Schwartz replaced Joe Edgar at right guard; Henry Boisseau replaced Walter Ritchie at right end; Walter Richie replaced Henry Boisseau at quarterback; Ted Perry replaced Charles Springer at left halfback; Charles Springer replaced Gilbert Miller at fullback; and Waldy Zieg replaced Charles Springer at fullback. The game consisted of one twenty-minute half and one fifteen-minute half.

=== West Virginia ===
West Virginia at Pitt

Team	1	2	Total
West Virginia	0	0	0
• Pitt	29	24	53

- Date: November 8, 1904
- Location: Exposition Park
  Pittsburgh, PA
- Game attendance: 4,000
- Referee: Dr. Harmon (California Normal)

On November 8 the boisterous students of WUP were led into Exposition Park by a band for the 1904 edition of the “Backyard Brawl”. Close to four thousand fans were in attendance. Coach Mosse inserted his well-rested first string lineup against the visitors from Morgantown, West Virginia. The Mountaineers defense could not stop the WUP offense. In the first five minutes of play, WUP quarterback Frank Rugh was ejected for fighting and replaced by Walter Ritchie. The WUPs were not deterred as Joe Thompson, Omar Mehl and Jud Schmidt all scored more than one touchdown. Omar Mehl delighted the crowd with a seventy-three-yard dash to the end zone in the second half. The WUP defense did not allow West Virginia to penetrate their side of the field. Numerous West Virginia fumbles resulted in short touchdown drives for the WUP offense. Joe Edgar was successful on eight of nine goal kicks. The WUP students and fans were more than satisfied. The final score read 53–0. The WUP starting lineup for the game with West Virginia was Theodore Perry (left end), Leslie Waddill (left tackle), Waldy Zieg (left guard), Arthur McKean (center), Joe Edgar (right guard), Calvin Marshall (right tackle), Walter East (right end), Frank Rugh (quarterback), Joe Thompson (left halfback), Jud Schmidt (right halfback) and Omar Mehl (fullback). Substitutions during the game were: Walter Ritchie replaced Frank Rugh at quarterback; Henry Boisseau replaced Ted Perry at left end; and Curt Leidenroth replaced Waldy Zeig at left guard. The game consisted of thirty-minute halves.

=== Bethany ===
Bethany at Pitt

Team	1	2	Total
Bethany	0	0	0
• Pitt	10	11	21

- Date: November 19, 1904
- Location: Exposition Park
  Pittsburgh, PA
- Game attendance: 750
- Referee: Harry Fry (P.A.C.)

On November 19, in front of a sparse crowd, the WUP second team played a short (two fifteen-minute halves) game against the Bethany College eleven. The scrubs scored only four touchdowns as Bethany's defense gave them some problems. Gilbert Miller scored two touchdowns. Henry Boisseau and James McCormick each scored one. John Sullivan had an off day and only made one goal kick out of four. The WUP defense had no trouble controlling the Bethany offense and kept them out of the end zone. The final tally was 21–0. Coach Mosse wanted to keep his first team healthy for the battle with State College on Thanksgiving Day, but they did practice some signals during the halftime break to the delight of the fans. The WUP lineup for the game against Bethany was Thomas Crea (left end), Frank Righter (left tackle), John Sullivan (left guard), Curt Leidenroth (center), Schwartz (right guard), William Elliott (right tackle), Edward Trax (right end), Walter Ritchie (quarterback), Henry Boisseau (left halfback), James McCormick (right halfback) and Gilbert Miller (fullback). Substitutions during the game were: Walter East replaced Edward Trax at right end; Waldy Zieg replaced John Sullivan at left guard; Calvin Marshall replaced William Elliott at right tackle; and Leslie Waddill replaced Frank Righter at left tackle.

=== Penn State ===
Penn State at Pitt

Team	1	2	Total
Penn State	0	5	5
• Pitt	17	5	22

- Date: October 26, 1904
- Location: Exposition Park
  Pittsburgh, PA
- Game attendance: 8,500
- Referee: E. P. Young (Cornell)

All of the football fans in Pittsburgh had Thanksgiving Day circled on their calendar. Could the unbeaten, unscored upon Western University finally beat the 6–3 State College eleven? State College had lost to eastern heavyweights Yale, Penn and Navy. The State College lineup was missing three starters due to injury – running back Carl Forkum, tackle Andy Moscrip and end Charles Campbell. The WUP lineup was healthy and well prepared. The students paraded to the stadium behind a band of forty instruments. The light drizzle probably kept the crowd from totaling ten thousand but did not dampen the enthusiasm of the fans that braved the weather. The WUP defense held the Lions on their opening drive and forced a punt. The WUP offense led by their strong backfield of Joe Thompson, Jud Schmidt and Omar Mehl marched the ball down the field. Jud Schmidt finally scored from the half yard line. Joe Edgar was successful on the goal kick after and WUP led 6–0. WUP received the ensuing kickoff but the State College defense forced a punt. On first down Irish McIlveen fumbled and Frank Rugh recovered for the WUP on the State College nineteen yard line. On third down, Omar Mehl scored from eleven yards out. Edgar was again successful on the goal kick. After an exchange of possessions, Jud Schmidt broke loose on a sixty-seven-yard scamper deep into State College territory. Three plays later Schmidt punched the pigskin in from the three and WUP led 17–0 at halftime. Mehl scored his second touchdown early in the second half. Coach Mosse made wholesale substitutions to get everybody enough playing time to qualify for a letter. State College halfback Irish McIlveen scored a touchdown late in the game to make the final score 22–5. The WUP lineup for the game against Penn State was Theodore Perry (left end), Leslie Waddill (left tackle), Waldy Zieg (left guard), Arthur McKean (center), Joe Edgar (right guard), Calvin Marshall (right tackle), Walter East (right end), Frank Rugh (quarterback), Joe Thompson (left halfback), Jud Schmidt (right halfback) and Omar Mehl (fullback). Substitutions during the game were: Henry Boisseau replaced Ted Perry at left end; Curt Leidenroth replaced Arthur McKean at center; Frank Righter replaced Waltert East at right end; Walter Ritchie replaced Frank Rugh at quarterback; and James McCormick replaced Jud Schmidt at right halfback. The game consisted of thirty-five-minute halves.

== Scoring summary ==
1904 Western University of Pennsylvania scoring summary
Player	Touchdowns	Extra points	Safety	Points
Omar Mehl	17	0	0	85
Joseph Thompson	12	0	0	60
Jud Schmidt	12	0	0	60
Joe Edgar	1	40	0	45
Charles Springer	6	0	0	30
James McCormick	5	0	0	25
Henry Boisseau	3	1	0	16
Cal Marshall	2	0	0	10
Walter East	3	2	0	10
Rosser	2	0	0	10
Gilbert Miller	2	0	0	10
Walter Ritchie	2	0	0	10
Waldemar Zieg	1	0	0	5
Theodore Perry	2	0	0	5
Frank Righter	1	0	0	5
James O'Sullivan	0	4	0	4
Team	0	0	2	4
Totals	71	47	2	406
