= G. B. Ward =

American football player, coach, and lawyer (1878–1942)

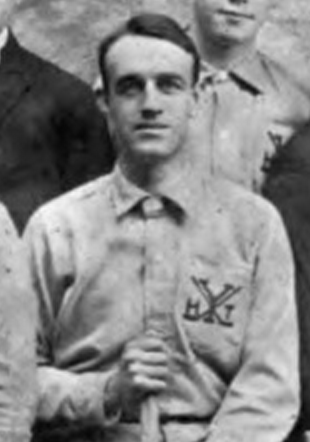
- Ward pictured as captain of the hockey team in The Pot-pourri, Yale yearbook (1904)

Biographical details
- Born: November 6, 1878; Bristol, Connecticut, U.S.
- Died: January 22, 1942 (aged 63); Hartford, Connecticut, U.S.
- Education: Yale University; Yale Law School

Playing career
- 1899–1900: Yale

Coaching career (HC unless noted)
- 1904: New Hampshire

Head coaching record
- Overall: 2–5

Accomplishments and honors

Championships
- National (1900)

George Burwell Ward (November 6, 1878 – January 22, 1942) was an American player and coach of college football, and a lawyer in Connecticut.

== Biography ==
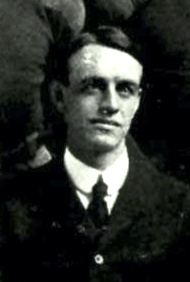
Ward in the 1904 New Hampshire football team photo

Ward graduated from Yale University in 1902 and Yale Law School in 1904. At Yale, he lettered in hockey, football and baseball; he was a member of the Yale football teams of 1899 and 1900. The 1900 team finished with a 12–0 record and was retroactively named as the national champion. He was a member of Zeta Psi fraternity.

Ward served as the head football coach of the New Hampshire football team at New Hampshire College of Agriculture and the Mechanic Arts in Durham, New Hampshire, in 1904. The college would become the University of New Hampshire in 1923 and would adopt the Wildcats nickname in 1926. Ward compiled a coaching record of 2–5.

Ward began practicing law in Connecticut in 1905, first in Hartford until 1917, and later in Bristol from 1926 until shortly before his death in 1942.

== Head coaching record ==
Year	Team	Overall	Conference	Standing	Bowl/playoffs
New Hampshire (Independent) (1904)
1904	New Hampshire	2–5			
New Hampshire:		2–5			
Total:		2–5			
