= 1904 Yale Bulldogs football team =

American college football season

1904 Yale Bulldogs football
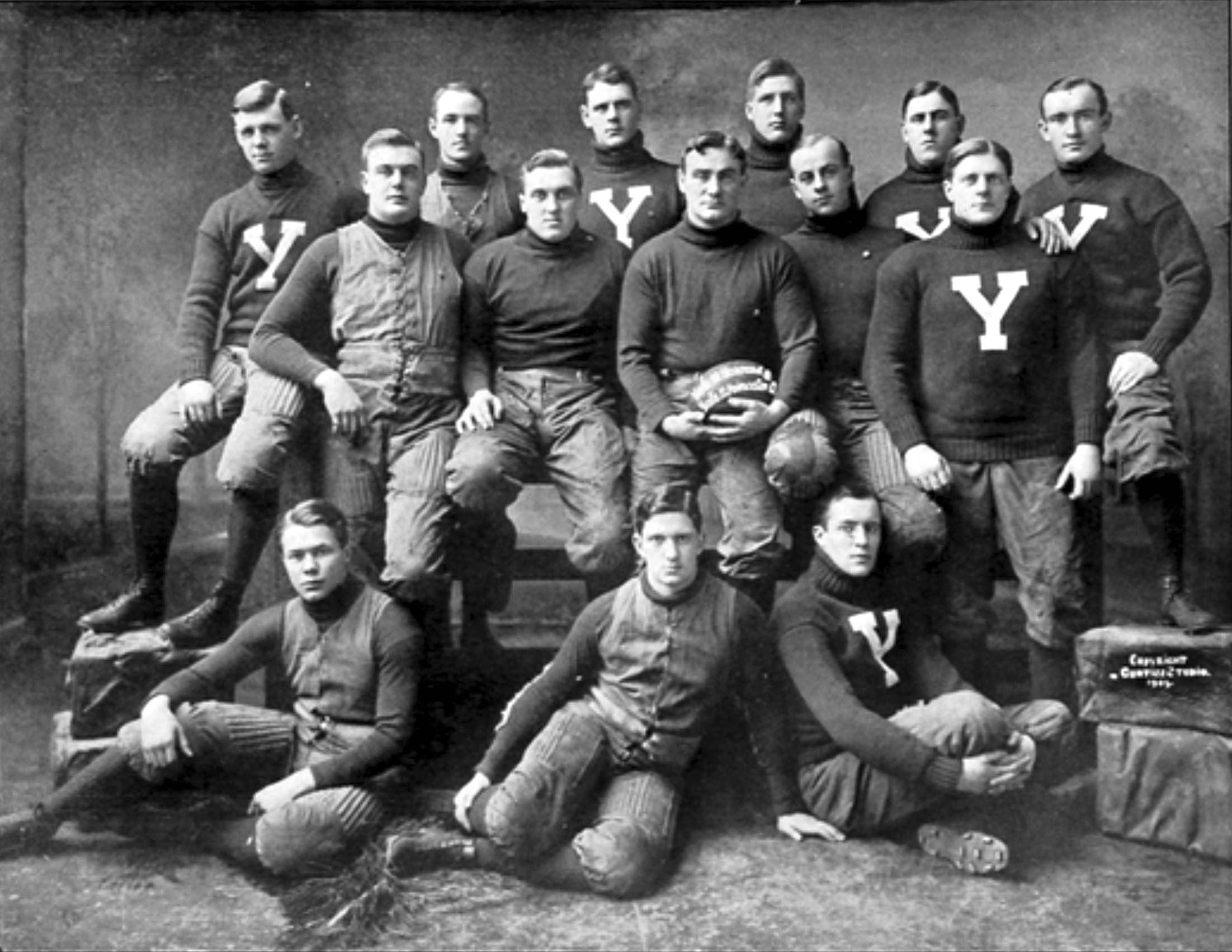
- Conference: Independent
- Record: 10–1
- Head coach: Charles D. Rafferty (1st season)
- Captain: James Hogan
- Home stadium: Yale Field

1904 Eastern college football independents records
	Conf.			Overall
Team	W	L	T	W		L		T
Penn		–		12	–	0	–	0
Western U. of Penn.		–		10	–	0	–	0
Dartmouth		–		7	–	0	–	1
Yale		–		10	–	1	–	0
Amherst		–		9	–	1	–	0
Colgate		–		8	–	1	–	1
Carlisle		–		10	–	2	–	0
Lafayette		–		8	–	2	–	0
Princeton		–		8	–	2	–	0
Army		–		7	–	2	–	0
Fordham		–		4	–	1	–	1
Harvard		–		7	–	2	–	1
Dickinson		–		8	–	3	–	1
Columbia		–		7	–	3	–	0
Cornell		–		7	–	3	–	0
Villanova		–		4	–	2	–	1
Syracuse		–		6	–	3	–	0
Swarthmore		–		6	–	3	–	0
Washington & Jefferson		–		5	–	3	–	1
Penn State		–		6	–	4	–	0
Temple		–		3	–	2	–	0
Brown		–		6	–	5	–	0
Bucknell		–		3	–	3	–	0
Springfield Training School		–		4	–	4	–	1
NYU		–		3	–	6	–	0
Holy Cross		–		2	–	5	–	2
Wesleyan		–		3	–	7	–	0
Geneva		–		1	–	4	–	2
Vermont		–		1	–	5	–	2
New Hampshire		–		2	–	5	–	0
Rutgers		–		1	–	6	–	2
Tufts		–		2	–	9	–	1
Lehigh		–		1	–	8	–	0
Franklin & Marshall		–		0	–	10	–	0

The 1904 Yale Bulldogs football team represented Yale University in the 1904 college football season. The Bulldogs finished with a 10–1 record under first-year head coach Charles D. Rafferty. The team outscored its opponents by a combined 220 to 20 score with the only loss being by an 11–6 score to Army.

Four Yale players (quarterback Foster Rockwell, end Tom Shevlin, tackle James Hogan, and guard Ralph Kinney) were consensus picks for the 1904 College Football All-America Team.

== Schedule ==
Date	Opponent	Site	Result	Attendance	Source
September 28	Wesleyan	Yale Field; New Haven, CT	W 22–0		
October 1	Trinity (CT)	Yale Field; New Haven, CT	W 42–0		
October 5	Holy Cross	Yale Field; New Haven, CT	W 23–0		
October 8	Penn State	Yale Field; New Haven, CT	W 24–0		
October 12	Springfield Training School	Yale Field; New Haven, CT	W 6–0	100	
October 15	Syracuse	Yale Field; New Haven, CT	W 17–9		
October 22	at Army	West Point, NY	L 6–11		
October 29	at Columbia	American League Park; New York, NY	W 34–0		
November 5	Brown	Yale Field; New Haven, CT	W 22–0		
November 12	at Princeton	Princeton, NJ (rivalry)	W 12–0		
November 19	Harvard	Yale Field; New Haven, CT (rivalry)	W 12–0		

== Roster ==
- James Bloomer, T
- John M. Cates, E
- Arthur G. Erwin, G
- Carl S. Flanders
- A. Rex Flinn, FB
- Gilles, G
- Morin S. Hare, E
- James Hogan, T
- Lydig Hoyt, HB
- Guy Hutchinson, QB
- Willard Hyatt
- James P. Kineon, T
- Ralph Kinney, G
- Kockenberger, G
- Jack Leavenworth, HB
- Donald F. MacKay
- P. Morse, FB
- Frank McCoy
- Samuel Finley Brown Morse, HB
- Chester T. Neal, E
- Ortmayer, E
- Jack Owsley
- James John Quill, HB
- Foster Rockwell, QB
- Howard Roome, HB
- J. Clinton Roraback, C
- Carleton Shaw
- Tom Shevlin, FB
- John A. Stevenson, HB
- Stewart, E
- Charles B. Stuart
- Roswell Tripp, G
- H. Turner, G
- Paul Veeder, HB
- Frank E. Warnecken
- Edwin White, FB
