= 1904 Bucknell football team =

American college football season

1904 Bucknell football
- Conference: Independent
- Record: 3–3
- Head coach: George W. Hoskins (6th season)
- Captain: John Johnson

1904 Eastern college football independents records
	Conf.			Overall
Team	W	L	T	W		L		T
Penn		–		12	–	0	–	0
Western U. of Penn.		–		10	–	0	–	0
Dartmouth		–		7	–	0	–	1
Yale		–		10	–	1	–	0
Amherst		–		9	–	1	–	0
Colgate		–		8	–	1	–	1
Carlisle		–		10	–	2	–	0
Lafayette		–		8	–	2	–	0
Princeton		–		8	–	2	–	0
Army		–		7	–	2	–	0
Fordham		–		4	–	1	–	1
Harvard		–		7	–	2	–	1
Dickinson		–		8	–	3	–	1
Columbia		–		7	–	3	–	0
Cornell		–		7	–	3	–	0
Villanova		–		4	–	2	–	1
Syracuse		–		6	–	3	–	0
Swarthmore		–		6	–	3	–	0
Washington & Jefferson		–		5	–	3	–	1
Penn State		–		6	–	4	–	0
Temple		–		3	–	2	–	0
Brown		–		6	–	5	–	0
Bucknell		–		3	–	3	–	0
Springfield Training School		–		4	–	4	–	1
NYU		–		3	–	6	–	0
Holy Cross		–		2	–	5	–	2
Wesleyan		–		3	–	7	–	0
Geneva		–		1	–	4	–	2
Vermont		–		1	–	5	–	2
New Hampshire		–		2	–	5	–	0
Rutgers		–		1	–	6	–	2
Tufts		–		2	–	9	–	1
Lehigh		–		1	–	8	–	0
Franklin & Marshall		–		0	–	10	–	0

The 1904 Bucknell football team was an American football team that represented Bucknell University as an independent during the 1904 college football season. Led by sixth-year head coach George W. Hoskins, the team compiled a 3–3 record. John Johnson was the team captain.

== Schedule ==
Date	Time	Opponent	Site	Result	Attendance	Source
September 24		Lebanon Valley	Lewisburg, PA	W 30–0		
October 1		Villanova	Lewisburg, PA	W 26–0		
October 8	2:30 p.m.	vs. Carlisle	Athletic Park; Williamsport, PA	L 4–10		
October 15		at Cornell	Percy Field; Ithaca, NY	L 12–24		
October 29		at Maryland Athletic Club	Baltimore Oval; Baltimore, MD	W 5–0		
November 12	3:30 p.m.	at Georgetown	Georgetown Field; Washington, DC	L 0–12		
