= James Hogan (American football) =

Irish player of American football

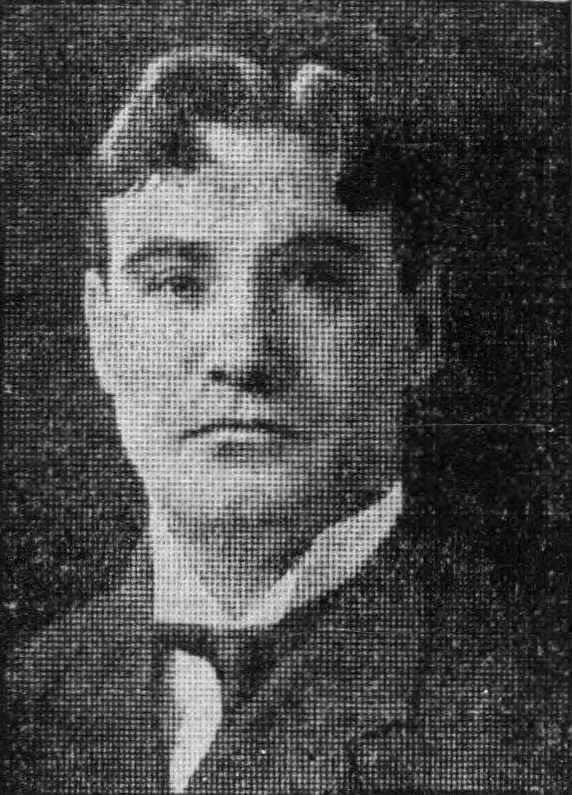

Profile
- Position: Tackle

Personal information
- Born: November 1, 1876 (Note: Hogan's date of birth is listed as November 1, 1876, by the College Football Hall of Fame. Other sources vary: a 1910 Yale report listed it as October 31, 1872, The New York Times said he was 36 at the time of his death (suggesting an 1873/74 birth date), while other newspaper reports said he was born in 1874. Phillips Exeter Academy records indicate he was 24 when he enrolled there in 1897, suggesting 1873/74.); Glenbane, County Tipperary, Ireland
- Died: March 20, 1910 (aged 33); New Haven, Connecticut, U.S.
- Listed height: 5 ft 10 in (1.78 m)
- Listed weight: 210 lb (95 kg)

Career information
- High school: Phillips Exeter Academy
- College: Yale (1901–1904)

Awards and highlights
- 3× Consensus All-American (1902, 1903, 1904)
- College Football Hall of Fame (Class of 1954)

James Joseph Hogan (November 1, 1876 – March 20, 1910) was an Irish-American college football player. A member of the Yale Bulldogs football team from 1901 to 1904, he was recognized three times as a consensus All-America selection. He was posthumously elected to the College Football Hall of Fame in 1954.

== Biography ==
Hogan was born in County Tipperary, Ireland, and moved to Torrington, Connecticut, with his family while young. He entered Phillips Exeter Academy in 1897, and was captain of the gridiron football team in 1899 and 1900.

At Yale University, Hogan played four seasons as a tackle on the football varsity, 1901–1904, and was team captain of the 1904 Bulldogs. The Bulldogs compiled an overall 43–3–2 record during his four seasons. He also was a member of Yale's track team and the Skull and Bones secret society. He received All-America honors in football each season, the final three being a consensus selection.

After leaving Yale, Hogan returned to Phillips Exeter Academy and coached football. He entered Columbia Law School and while there wrote for the Columbia Law Review and the New York World. He graduated from Columbia in 1908. After initially working at a law firm, he went to work for the City of New York as a deputy street cleaning commissioner, a role which he held until early 1910. He died in March 1910 from Bright's disease (Note: Bright's disease is now known as nephritis.) and was buried in Torrington, Connecticut.
