= 1904 Lafayette football team =

American college football season

1904 Lafayette football
- Conference: Independent
- Record: 8–2
- Head coach: Alfred E. Bull (2nd season)
- Captain: Joseph Morrison
- Home stadium: March Field

1904 Eastern college football independents records
	Conf.			Overall
Team	W	L	T	W		L		T
Penn		–		12	–	0	–	0
Western U. of Penn.		–		10	–	0	–	0
Dartmouth		–		7	–	0	–	1
Yale		–		10	–	1	–	0
Amherst		–		9	–	1	–	0
Colgate		–		8	–	1	–	1
Carlisle		–		10	–	2	–	0
Lafayette		–		8	–	2	–	0
Princeton		–		8	–	2	–	0
Army		–		7	–	2	–	0
Fordham		–		4	–	1	–	1
Harvard		–		7	–	2	–	1
Dickinson		–		8	–	3	–	1
Columbia		–		7	–	3	–	0
Cornell		–		7	–	3	–	0
Villanova		–		4	–	2	–	1
Syracuse		–		6	–	3	–	0
Swarthmore		–		6	–	3	–	0
Washington & Jefferson		–		5	–	3	–	1
Penn State		–		6	–	4	–	0
Temple		–		3	–	2	–	0
Brown		–		6	–	5	–	0
Bucknell		–		3	–	3	–	0
Springfield Training School		–		4	–	4	–	1
NYU		–		3	–	6	–	0
Holy Cross		–		2	–	5	–	2
Wesleyan		–		3	–	7	–	0
Geneva		–		1	–	4	–	2
Vermont		–		1	–	5	–	2
New Hampshire		–		2	–	5	–	0
Rutgers		–		1	–	6	–	2
Tufts		–		2	–	9	–	1
Lehigh		–		1	–	8	–	0
Franklin & Marshall		–		0	–	10	–	0

The 1904 Lafayette football team was an American football team that represented Lafayette College as an independent during the 1904 college football season. In its second season under head coach Alfred E. Bull, the team compiled a 7–2 record. Joseph Morrison was the team captain. The team played its home games at March Field in Easton, Pennsylvania.

== Schedule ==
Date	Opponent	Site	Result
September 24	Wyoming Seminary		W 35–0
October 1	Ursinus		W 12–0
October 5	Gettysburg		W 20–0
October 8	Gallaudet		W 53–0
October 12	at Princeton		L 0–5
October 15	Bloomsburg		W 33–0
October 22	Swarthmore		W 4–0
October 29	Manhattan		W 54–0
November 5	at Penn		L 0–22
November 24	Lehigh		W 40–6
