= 1904 Dartmouth football team =

American college football season

1904 Dartmouth football
- Conference: Independent
- Record: 7–0–1
- Head coach: Fred Folsom (2nd season)
- Captain: David Main

1904 Eastern college football independents records
	Conf.			Overall
Team	W	L	T	W		L		T
Penn		–		12	–	0	–	0
Western U. of Penn.		–		10	–	0	–	0
Dartmouth		–		7	–	0	–	1
Yale		–		10	–	1	–	0
Amherst		–		9	–	1	–	0
Colgate		–		8	–	1	–	1
Carlisle		–		10	–	2	–	0
Lafayette		–		8	–	2	–	0
Princeton		–		8	–	2	–	0
Army		–		7	–	2	–	0
Fordham		–		4	–	1	–	1
Harvard		–		7	–	2	–	1
Dickinson		–		8	–	3	–	1
Columbia		–		7	–	3	–	0
Cornell		–		7	–	3	–	0
Villanova		–		4	–	2	–	1
Syracuse		–		6	–	3	–	0
Swarthmore		–		6	–	3	–	0
Washington & Jefferson		–		5	–	3	–	1
Penn State		–		6	–	4	–	0
Temple		–		3	–	2	–	0
Brown		–		6	–	5	–	0
Bucknell		–		3	–	3	–	0
Springfield Training School		–		4	–	4	–	1
NYU		–		3	–	6	–	0
Holy Cross		–		2	–	5	–	2
Wesleyan		–		3	–	7	–	0
Geneva		–		1	–	4	–	2
Vermont		–		1	–	5	–	2
New Hampshire		–		2	–	5	–	0
Rutgers		–		1	–	6	–	2
Tufts		–		2	–	9	–	1
Lehigh		–		1	–	8	–	0
Franklin & Marshall		–		0	–	10	–	0

The 1904 Dartmouth football team was an American football team that represented Dartmouth College as an independent during the 1904 college football season. In its second season under head coach Fred Folsom, the team compiled a 7–0–1 record, shut out five of eight opponents, and outscored opponents by a total of 143 to 13. David Main was the team captain. The team played its home games at Alumni Oval in Hanover, New Hampshire.

== Schedule ==
Date	Opponent	Site	Result	Source
September 28	Massachusetts	Alumni Oval; Hanover, NH	W 17–0	
October 8	Vermont	Alumni Oval; Hanover, NH	W 37–0	
October 15	vs. Williams	Newton, MA	W 11–0	
October 22	at Holy Cross	Holy Cross Field; Worcester, MA	W 18–4	
October 29	at Wesleyan	Andrus Field; Middletown, CT	W 33–0	
November 5	at Harvard	Harvard Stadium; Boston, MA (rivalry)	T 0–0	
November 12	Amherst	Pratt Field; Amherst, MA	W 5–4	
November 19	vs. Brown	Huntington Avenue Grounds; Boston, MA	W 12–5	
