= 1904 Carlisle Indians football team =

American college football season

1904 Carlisle Indians football
- Conference: Independent
- Record: 10–2
- Head coach: Eddie Rogers (1st season)
- Captain: Arthur Sheldon

1904 Eastern college football independents records
	Conf.			Overall
Team	W	L	T	W		L		T
Penn		–		12	–	0	–	0
Western U. of Penn.		–		10	–	0	–	0
Dartmouth		–		7	–	0	–	1
Yale		–		10	–	1	–	0
Amherst		–		9	–	1	–	0
Colgate		–		8	–	1	–	1
Carlisle		–		10	–	2	–	0
Lafayette		–		8	–	2	–	0
Princeton		–		8	–	2	–	0
Army		–		7	–	2	–	0
Fordham		–		4	–	1	–	1
Harvard		–		7	–	2	–	1
Dickinson		–		8	–	3	–	1
Columbia		–		7	–	3	–	0
Cornell		–		7	–	3	–	0
Villanova		–		4	–	2	–	1
Syracuse		–		6	–	3	–	0
Swarthmore		–		6	–	3	–	0
Washington & Jefferson		–		5	–	3	–	1
Penn State		–		6	–	4	–	0
Temple		–		3	–	2	–	0
Brown		–		6	–	5	–	0
Bucknell		–		3	–	3	–	0
Springfield Training School		–		4	–	4	–	1
NYU		–		3	–	6	–	0
Holy Cross		–		2	–	5	–	2
Wesleyan		–		3	–	7	–	0
Geneva		–		1	–	4	–	2
Vermont		–		1	–	5	–	2
New Hampshire		–		2	–	5	–	0
Rutgers		–		1	–	6	–	2
Tufts		–		2	–	9	–	1
Lehigh		–		1	–	8	–	0
Franklin & Marshall		–		0	–	10	–	0

The 1904 Carlisle Indians football team represented the Carlisle Indian Industrial School as an independent during the 1904 college football season. Led by Eddie Rogers in his first and only season as head coach, the Indians compiled a record of 10–2 and outscored opponents 347 to 44. Arthur Sheldon was the team captain.

The school started their program in 1895 and began playing against Ivy League schools. Within the next twenty years they became one of the strongest football teams in the country.

== Schedule ==
Date	Time	Opponent	Site	Result	Attendance	Source
September 17		Lebanon Valley	Carlisle, PA	W 28–0		
October 1		Gettysburg	Carlisle, PA	W 41–0		
October 5		Susquehanna	Carlisle, PA	W 53–0		
October 8	2:30 p.m.	vs. Bucknell	Athletic Park; Williamsport, PA	W 10–4		
October 15		Albright	Carlisle, PA	W 100–0		
October 22		at Harvard	Harvard Stadium; Boston, MA	L 0–12		
October 29	2:30 p.m.	vs. Virginia	Lafayette Field; Norfolk, VA	W 14–6	6,000	
November 5		Ursinus	Carlisle, PA	W 28–0		
November 12		at Penn	Franklin Field; Philadelphia, PA	L 0–18		
November 19		at Susquehanna	Selinsgrove, PA	W 12–6	2,000	
November 24		at Ohio State	Ohio Field; Columbus, OH	W 23–0		
November 26		vs. Haskell	World's Fair Stadium; St. Louis, MO	W 38–4	12,000	
