= 1904 Princeton Tigers football team =

American college football season

1904 Princeton Tigers football
- Conference: Independent
- Record: 8–2
- Head coach: Art Hillebrand (2nd season)
- Captain: W. L. Foulke
- Home stadium: University Field

1904 Eastern college football independents records
	Conf.			Overall
Team	W	L	T	W		L		T
Penn		–		12	–	0	–	0
Western U. of Penn.		–		10	–	0	–	0
Dartmouth		–		7	–	0	–	1
Yale		–		10	–	1	–	0
Amherst		–		9	–	1	–	0
Colgate		–		8	–	1	–	1
Carlisle		–		10	–	2	–	0
Lafayette		–		8	–	2	–	0
Princeton		–		8	–	2	–	0
Army		–		7	–	2	–	0
Fordham		–		4	–	1	–	1
Harvard		–		7	–	2	–	1
Dickinson		–		8	–	3	–	1
Columbia		–		7	–	3	–	0
Cornell		–		7	–	3	–	0
Villanova		–		4	–	2	–	1
Syracuse		–		6	–	3	–	0
Swarthmore		–		6	–	3	–	0
Washington & Jefferson		–		5	–	3	–	1
Penn State		–		6	–	4	–	0
Temple		–		3	–	2	–	0
Brown		–		6	–	5	–	0
Bucknell		–		3	–	3	–	0
Springfield Training School		–		4	–	4	–	1
NYU		–		3	–	6	–	0
Holy Cross		–		2	–	5	–	2
Wesleyan		–		3	–	7	–	0
Geneva		–		1	–	4	–	2
Vermont		–		1	–	5	–	2
New Hampshire		–		2	–	5	–	0
Rutgers		–		1	–	6	–	2
Tufts		–		2	–	9	–	1
Lehigh		–		1	–	8	–	0
Frankin & Marshall		–		0	–	10	–	0

The 1904 Princeton Tigers football team represented Princeton University in the 1904 college football season. The team finished with an 8–2 record under second-year head coach Art Hillebrand and outscored its opponents by a total of 181 to 34. Princeton tackle James Cooney was selected as a consensus first-team honoree on the 1904 College Football All-America Team.

== Schedule ==
Date	Opponent	Site	Result	Source
September 28	Dickinson	University Field; Princeton, NJ	W 12–0	
October 1	Georgetown	University Field; Princeton, NJ	W 10–0	
October 5	Wesleyan	University Field; Princeton, NJ	W 39–0	
October 8	Washington & Jefferson	University Field; Princeton, NJ	W 16–0	
October 12	Lafayette	University Field; Princeton, NJ	W 5–0	
October 15	at Navy	Worden Field; Annapolis, MD	L 9–10	
October 26	Lehigh	University Field; Princeton, NJ	W 60–0	
October 29	at Cornell	Percy Field; Ithaca, NY	W 18–6	
November 5	at Army	The Plain; West Point, NY	W 12–6	
November 12	Yale	University Field; Princeton, NJ (rivalry)	L 0–12	
