= 1904 Swarthmore Quakers football team =

American military football team

1904 Swarthmore Quakers football
- Conference: Independent
- Record: 6–3
- Head coach: George H. Brooke (6th season)
- Captain: Bower (left end)
- Home stadium: Whittier Field

1904 Eastern college football independents records
	Conf.			Overall
Team	W	L	T	W		L		T
Penn		–		12	–	0	–	0
Western U. of Penn.		–		10	–	0	–	0
Dartmouth		–		7	–	0	–	1
Yale		–		10	–	1	–	0
Amherst		–		9	–	1	–	0
Colgate		–		8	–	1	–	1
Carlisle		–		10	–	2	–	0
Lafayette		–		8	–	2	–	0
Princeton		–		8	–	2	–	0
Army		–		7	–	2	–	0
Fordham		–		4	–	1	–	1
Harvard		–		7	–	2	–	1
Dickinson		–		8	–	3	–	1
Columbia		–		7	–	3	–	0
Cornell		–		7	–	3	–	0
Villanova		–		4	–	2	–	1
Syracuse		–		6	–	3	–	0
Swarthmore		–		6	–	3	–	0
Washington & Jefferson		–		5	–	3	–	1
Penn State		–		6	–	4	–	0
Temple		–		3	–	2	–	0
Brown		–		6	–	5	–	0
Bucknell		–		3	–	3	–	0
Springfield Training School		–		4	–	4	–	1
NYU		–		3	–	6	–	0
Holy Cross		–		2	–	5	–	2
Wesleyan		–		3	–	7	–	0
Geneva		–		1	–	4	–	2
Vermont		–		1	–	5	–	2
New Hampshire		–		2	–	5	–	0
Rutgers		–		1	–	6	–	2
Tufts		–		2	–	9	–	1
Lehigh		–		1	–	8	–	0
Franklin & Marshall		–		0	–	10	–	0

The 1904 Swarthmore Quakers football team was an American football team that represented Swarthmore College as an independent during the 1904 college football season. The team compiled a 6–3 record and outscored their opponents by a total of 187 to 28. George H. Brooke was the head coach

The team featured drop kicker Wilmer G. Crowell. He made a 40-yard field goal against Lehigh, and 55-yard and 48-yard field goals against Franklin & Marshall.

== Schedule ==
Date	Opponent	Site	Result	Attendance	Source
September 28	at Penn	Franklin Field; Philadelphia, PA	L 4–6		
October 5	at Lehigh	Whittier Field; Swarthmore, PA	W 20–0		
	Jefferson Medical	Whittier Field; Swarthmore, PA	W 17–0		
October 12	at Columbia	American League Park; New York, NY	L 0–12	800	
October 15	Delaware	Whittier Field; Swarthmore, PA	W 41–0 or 40–0		
October 22	at Lafayette	Easton, PA	L 0–4		
October 29	at Navy	Worden Field; Annapolis, MD	W 9–0		
November 12	Franklin & Marshall	Whittier Field; Swarthmore, PA	W 69–0		
November 19	Haverford	Whittier Field; Swarthmore, PA (rivalry)	W 27–6	7,000	
November 24	Bucknell	Island Park	Cancelled		
