= 1904 Cornell Big Red football team =

American college football season

1904 Cornell Big Red football
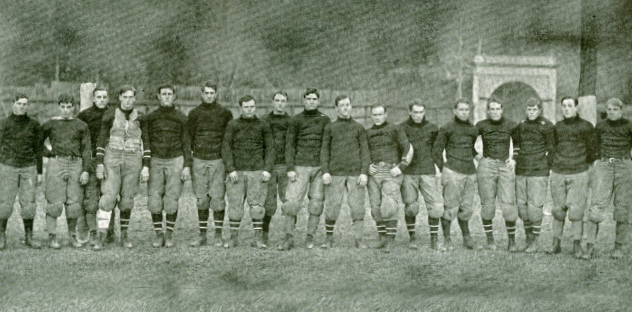
- Conference: Independent
- Record: 7–3
- Head coach: Pop Warner (3rd season)
- Captain: James Lynah
- Home stadium: Percy Field

1904 Eastern college football independents records
	Conf.			Overall
Team	W	L	T	W		L		T
Penn		–		12	–	0	–	0
Western U. of Penn.		–		10	–	0	–	0
Dartmouth		–		7	–	0	–	1
Yale		–		10	–	1	–	0
Amherst		–		9	–	1	–	0
Colgate		–		8	–	1	–	1
Carlisle		–		10	–	2	–	0
Lafayette		–		8	–	2	–	0
Princeton		–		8	–	2	–	0
Army		–		7	–	2	–	0
Fordham		–		4	–	1	–	1
Harvard		–		7	–	2	–	1
Dickinson		–		8	–	3	–	1
Columbia		–		7	–	3	–	0
Cornell		–		7	–	3	–	0
Villanova		–		4	–	2	–	1
Syracuse		–		6	–	3	–	0
Swarthmore		–		6	–	3	–	0
Washington & Jefferson		–		5	–	3	–	1
Penn State		–		6	–	4	–	0
Temple		–		3	–	2	–	0
Brown		–		6	–	5	–	0
Bucknell		–		3	–	3	–	0
Springfield Training School		–		4	–	4	–	1
NYU		–		3	–	6	–	0
Holy Cross		–		2	–	5	–	2
Wesleyan		–		3	–	7	–	0
Geneva		–		1	–	4	–	2
Vermont		–		1	–	5	–	2
New Hampshire		–		2	–	5	–	0
Rutgers		–		1	–	6	–	2
Tufts		–		2	–	9	–	1
Lehigh		–		1	–	8	–	0
Franklin & Marshall		–		0	–	10	–	0

The 1904 Cornell Big Red football team was an American football team that represented Cornell University during the 1904 college football season. In their third, non-consecutive season under head coach Pop Warner, the Big Red compiled a 7–3 record and outscored all opponents by a combined total of 226 to 92.

== Schedule ==
Date	Opponent	Site	Result	Attendance	Source
September 28	Colgate	Percy Field; Ithaca, NY (rivalry)	W 17–0		
October 1	Rochester	Percy Field; Ithaca, NY	W 29–6		
October 5	Hobart	Percy Field; Ithaca, NY	W 24–0		
October 8	Hamilton	Percy Field; Ithaca, NY	W 34–0		
October 15	Bucknell	Percy Field; Ithaca, NY	W 24–12		
October 22	Franklin & Marshall	Percy Field; Ithaca, NY	W 36–5		
October 29	Princeton	Percy Field; Ithaca, NY	L 6–18		
November 5	Lehigh	Percy Field; Ithaca, NY	W 50–5		
November 12	at Columbia	American League Park; New York, NY (rivalry)	L 6–12	8,000	
November 24	at Penn	Franklin Field; Philadelphia, PA (rivalry)	L 0–34	> 20,000	
