= 1904 Army Cadets football team =

American college football season

1904 Army Cadets football
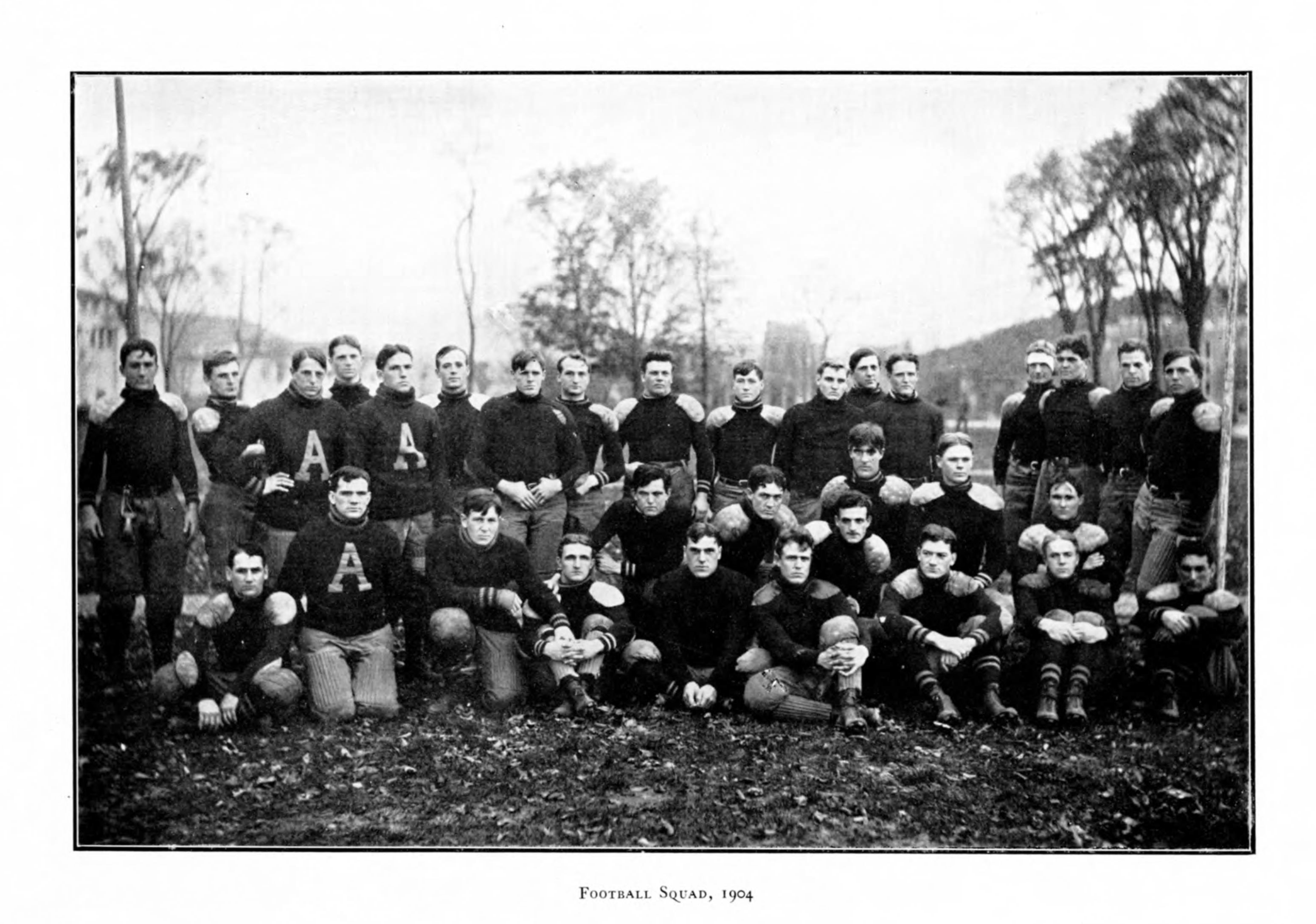
- Conference: Independent
- Record: 7–2
- Head coach: Robert Boyers (1st season)
- Captains: Thomas Doe; Ernest Graves Sr.
- Home stadium: The Plain

1904 Eastern college football independents records
	Conf.			Overall
Team	W	L	T	W		L		T
Penn		–		12	–	0	–	0
Western U. of Penn.		–		10	–	0	–	0
Dartmouth		–		7	–	0	–	1
Yale		–		10	–	1	–	0
Amherst		–		9	–	1	–	0
Colgate		–		8	–	1	–	1
Carlisle		–		10	–	2	–	0
Lafayette		–		8	–	2	–	0
Princeton		–		8	–	2	–	0
Army		–		7	–	2	–	0
Fordham		–		4	–	1	–	1
Harvard		–		7	–	2	–	1
Dickinson		–		8	–	3	–	1
Columbia		–		7	–	3	–	0
Cornell		–		7	–	3	–	0
Villanova		–		4	–	2	–	1
Syracuse		–		6	–	3	–	0
Swarthmore		–		6	–	3	–	0
Washington & Jefferson		–		5	–	3	–	1
Penn State		–		6	–	4	–	0
Temple		–		3	–	2	–	0
Brown		–		6	–	5	–	0
Bucknell		–		3	–	3	–	0
Springfield Training School		–		4	–	4	–	1
NYU		–		3	–	6	–	0
Holy Cross		–		2	–	5	–	2
Wesleyan		–		3	–	7	–	0
Geneva		–		1	–	4	–	2
Vermont		–		1	–	5	–	2
New Hampshire		–		2	–	5	–	0
Rutgers		–		1	–	6	–	2
Tufts		–		2	–	9	–	1
Lehigh		–		1	–	8	–	0
Franklin & Marshall		–		0	–	10	–	0

The 1904 Army Cadets football team represented the United States Military Academy as an independent during the 1904 college football season. In their first season under head coach Robert Boyers, the Cadets compiled a record of 7–2, shut out five of their nine opponents, and outscored all opponents by a combined total of 136 to 27. The team's two losses were to Harvard and Princeton. In the annual Army–Navy Game, the Cadets defeated the Midshipmen 11–0.

Five members of the squad were honored by one or both of Walter Camp (WC) and Caspar Whitney (CW) on the All-America team. They are: center Arthur Tipton (WC-1, CW-1); back Henry Torney (CW-1); end Alexander Garfield Gillespie (WC-2); halfback Frederick Prince (CW-2); and tackle Thomas Doe (WC-3).

== Schedule ==
Date	Opponent	Site	Result	Source
October 1	Tufts	The Plain; West Point, NY	W 12–0	
October 8	Dickinson	The Plain; West Point, NY	W 18–0	
October 15	Harvard	The Plain; West Point, NY	L 0–4	
October 22	Yale	The Plain; West Point, NY	W 11–6	
October 29	Williams	The Plain; West Point, NY	W 16–0	
November 5	Princeton	The Plain; West Point, NY	L 6–12	
November 12	NYU	The Plain; West Point, NY	W 41–0	
November 19	Syracuse	The Plain; West Point, NY	W 21–5	
November 26	vs. Navy	Franklin Field; Philadelphia, PA (Army–Navy Game)	W 11–0	
