= 1904 Columbia Blue and White football team =

American college football season

1904 Columbia Blue and White football
- Conference: Independent
- Record: 7–3
- Head coach: Bill Morley (3rd season)
- Captain: Robert Stangland
- Home stadium: American League Park

1904 Eastern college football independents records
	Conf.			Overall
Team	W	L	T	W		L		T
Penn		–		12	–	0	–	0
Western U. of Penn.		–		10	–	0	–	0
Dartmouth		–		7	–	0	–	1
Yale		–		10	–	1	–	0
Amherst		–		9	–	1	–	0
Colgate		–		8	–	1	–	1
Carlisle		–		10	–	2	–	0
Lafayette		–		8	–	2	–	0
Princeton		–		8	–	2	–	0
Army		–		7	–	2	–	0
Fordham		–		4	–	1	–	1
Harvard		–		7	–	2	–	1
Dickinson		–		8	–	3	–	1
Columbia		–		7	–	3	–	0
Cornell		–		7	–	3	–	0
Villanova		–		4	–	2	–	1
Syracuse		–		6	–	3	–	0
Swarthmore		–		6	–	3	–	0
Washington & Jefferson		–		5	–	3	–	1
Penn State		–		6	–	4	–	0
Temple		–		3	–	2	–	0
Brown		–		6	–	5	–	0
Bucknell		–		3	–	3	–	0
Springfield Training School		–		4	–	4	–	1
NYU		–		3	–	6	–	0
Holy Cross		–		2	–	5	–	2
Wesleyan		–		3	–	7	–	0
Geneva		–		1	–	4	–	2
Vermont		–		1	–	5	–	2
New Hampshire		–		2	–	5	–	0
Rutgers		–		1	–	6	–	2
Tufts		–		2	–	9	–	1
Lehigh		–		1	–	8	–	0
Franklin & Marshall		–		0	–	10	–	0

The 1904 Columbia Blue and White football team was an American football team that represented Columbia University as an independent during the 1904 college football season. In its third season under head coach Bill Morley, the team compiled a 7–3 record and outscored opponents by a total of 120 to 68. Robert Stangland was the team captain.

The team's roster included W. E. Metzenthin at quarterback and Tom Thorp at tackle. Metzenthin was selected as a first-team All-American by the New York Herald, and Thorp was selected as a second-team All-American by Walter Camp, Caspar Whitney, and the New York Sun.

Columbia's sports teams were commonly called the "Blue and White" in this era, but had no official nickname. The name "Lions" would not be adopted until 1910.

The team played its home games at the American League Park, a baseball park in the Washington Heights neighborhood of Upper Manhattan in New York City, and also the home field of the New York Yankees.

== Schedule ==
Date	Opponent	Site	Result	Attendance	Source
September 24	Union (NY)	American League Park; New York, NY	W 10–0	400	
September 28	Franklin & Marshall	American League Park; New York, NY	W 28–0		
October 1	Wesleyan	American League Park; New York, NY	W 16–0	1,500	
October 4	Tufts	American League Park; New York, NY	W 31–0		
October 8	Williams	American League Park; New York, NY	W 11–0	3,000	
October 12	Swarthmore	American League Park; New York, NY	W 12–0	800	
October 15	Amherst	American League Park; New York, NY	L 0–12	4,853	
October 22	at Penn	Franklin Field; Philadelphia, PA	L 0–16	15,000	
October 29	Yale	American League Park; New York, NY	L 0–34		
November 12	Cornell	American League Park; New York, NY (rivalry)	W 12–6	8,000	
