= 1904 Harvard Crimson football team =

American college football season

1904 Harvard Crimson football
- Conference: Independent
- Record: 7–2–1
- Head coach: Edgar Wrightington (1st season)
- Captain: Daniel Hurley
- Home stadium: Harvard Stadium

1904 Eastern college football independents records
| | Conf. | | | Overall |
| Team | W | L | T | W | | L | | T |
|---|---|---|---|---|---|---|---|---|
| Penn | | – | | 12 | – | 0 | – | 0 |
| Western U. of Penn. | | – | | 10 | – | 0 | – | 0 |
| Dartmouth | | – | | 7 | – | 0 | – | 1 |
| Yale | | – | | 10 | – | 1 | – | 0 |
| Amherst | | – | | 9 | – | 1 | – | 0 |
| Colgate | | – | | 8 | – | 1 | – | 1 |
| Carlisle | | – | | 10 | – | 2 | – | 0 |
| Lafayette | | – | | 8 | – | 2 | – | 0 |
| Princeton | | – | | 8 | – | 2 | – | 0 |
| Army | | – | | 7 | – | 2 | – | 0 |
| Fordham | | – | | 4 | – | 1 | – | 1 |
| Harvard | | – | | 7 | – | 2 | – | 1 |
| Dickinson | | – | | 8 | – | 3 | – | 1 |
| Columbia | | – | | 7 | – | 3 | – | 0 |
| Cornell | | – | | 7 | – | 3 | – | 0 |
| Villanova | | – | | 4 | – | 2 | – | 1 |
| Syracuse | | – | | 6 | – | 3 | – | 0 |
| Swarthmore | | – | | 6 | – | 3 | – | 0 |
| Washington & Jefferson | | – | | 5 | – | 3 | – | 1 |
| Penn State | | – | | 6 | – | 4 | – | 0 |
| Temple | | – | | 3 | – | 2 | – | 0 |
| Brown | | – | | 6 | – | 5 | – | 0 |
| Bucknell | | – | | 3 | – | 3 | – | 0 |
| Springfield Training School | | – | | 4 | – | 4 | – | 1 |
| NYU | | – | | 3 | – | 6 | – | 0 |
| Holy Cross | | – | | 2 | – | 5 | – | 2 |
| Wesleyan | | – | | 3 | – | 7 | – | 0 |
| Geneva | | – | | 1 | – | 4 | – | 2 |
| Vermont | | – | | 1 | – | 5 | – | 2 |
| New Hampshire | | – | | 2 | – | 5 | – | 0 |
| Rutgers | | – | | 1 | – | 6 | – | 2 |
| Tufts | | – | | 2 | – | 9 | – | 1 |
| Lehigh | | – | | 1 | – | 8 | – | 0 |
| Franklin & Marshall | | – | | 0 | – | 10 | – | 0 |

The 1904 Harvard Crimson football team represented Harvard University in the 1904 college football season. The Crimson finished with a 7–2–1 record under first-year head coach Edgar Wrightington. Walter Camp selected only one Harvard player, halfback Daniel Hurley, as a first-team selection to his 1904 College Football All-America Team.

== Schedule ==
| Date | Opponent | Site | Result | Attendance | Source |
|---|---|---|---|---|---|
| September 28 | Williams | Harvard Stadium; Boston, MA | W 24–0 | | |
| October 5 | Bowdoin | Harvard Stadium; Boston, MA | W 17–0 | 5,000 | |
| October 8 | Maine | Harvard Stadium; Boston, MA | W 23–0 | | |
| October 12 | Bates | Harvard Stadium; Boston, MA | W 11–0 | | |
| October 15 | at Army | The Plain; West Point, NY | W 4–0 | | |
| October 22 | Carlisle | Harvard Stadium; Boston, MA | W 12–0 | | |
| October 29 | Penn | Harvard Stadium; Boston, MA (rivalry) | L 0–11 | 15,000 | |
| November 5 | Dartmouth | Harvard Stadium; Boston, MA (rivalry) | T 0–0 | | |
| November 12 | Holy Cross | Harvard Stadium; Boston, MA | W 28–5 | 7,000 | |
| November 19 | at Yale | Yale Field; New Haven, CT (rivalry) | L 0–12 | | |
