= 1904 Brown Bears football team =

American college football season

1904 Brown Bears football
- Conference: Independent
- Record: 6–5
- Head coach: Edward N. Robinson (5th season)
- Captain: F. Schwinn
- Home stadium: Andrews Field

1904 Eastern college football independents records
	Conf.			Overall
Team	W	L	T	W		L		T
Penn		–		12	–	0	–	0
Western U. of Penn.		–		10	–	0	–	0
Dartmouth		–		7	–	0	–	1
Yale		–		10	–	1	–	0
Amherst		–		9	–	1	–	0
Colgate		–		8	–	1	–	1
Carlisle		–		10	–	2	–	0
Lafayette		–		8	–	2	–	0
Princeton		–		8	–	2	–	0
Army		–		7	–	2	–	0
Fordham		–		4	–	1	–	1
Harvard		–		7	–	2	–	1
Dickinson		–		8	–	3	–	1
Columbia		–		7	–	3	–	0
Cornell		–		7	–	3	–	0
Villanova		–		4	–	2	–	1
Syracuse		–		6	–	3	–	0
Swarthmore		–		6	–	3	–	0
Washington & Jefferson		–		5	–	3	–	1
Penn State		–		6	–	4	–	0
Temple		–		3	–	2	–	0
Brown		–		6	–	5	–	0
Bucknell		–		3	–	3	–	0
Springfield Training School		–		4	–	4	–	1
NYU		–		3	–	6	–	0
Holy Cross		–		2	–	5	–	2
Wesleyan		–		3	–	7	–	0
Geneva		–		1	–	4	–	2
Vermont		–		1	–	5	–	2
New Hampshire		–		2	–	5	–	0
Rutgers		–		1	–	6	–	2
Tufts		–		2	–	9	–	1
Lehigh		–		1	–	8	–	0
Franklin & Marshall		–		0	–	10	–	0

The 1904 Brown Bears football team represented Brown University as an independent during the 1904 college football season. Led by fifth-year head coach Edward N. Robinson, Brown compiled a record of 6–5.

== Schedule ==
Date	Opponent	Site	Result	Source
October 1	Maine	Andrews Field; Providence, RI	L 0–6	
October 8	Massachusetts	Andrews Field; Providence, RI	W 27–0	
October 12	Wesleyan	Andrews Field; Providence, RI	W 12–0	
October 15	at Penn	Franklin Field; Philadelphia, PA	L 0–6	
October 19	Amherst	Andrews Field; Providence, RI	L 0–5	
October 22	Bowdoin	Andrews Field; Providence, RI	W 22–0	
October 29	Vermont	Andrews Field; Providence, RI	W 33–0	
November 2	Tufts	Andrews Field; Providence, RI	W 41–0	
November 5	at Yale	Yale Field; New Haven, CT	L 0–22	
November 12	Colby	Andrews Field; Providence, RI	W 41–0	
November 19	vs. Dartmouth	Huntington Avenue Grounds; Boston, MA	L 5–12	
