= John M. Cates =

American football player, coach, and administrator (1878–1955)

John Cates
Biographical details
- Born: March 23, 1878; St. George, Maine, U.S.
- Died: November 9, 1955 (aged 77); Rye, New York, U.S.

Playing career
- 1905: Yale
- Position: End

Coaching career (HC unless noted)
- 1906–1908: Navy (assistant)
- 1925–1926: Bowdoin

Administrative career (AD unless noted)
- 1925–1927: Bowdoin
- 1927–1932: Yale

John Martin Cates (March 23, 1878 – November 9, 1955) was an American college football player, coach, and college athletics administrator. He served as the head football coach at Bowdoin College from 1925 to 1926. He was also the athletic director at Bowdoin from 1925 to 1927 and at Yale University from 1927 to 1932.

Cates played football at Yale as an end and was the captain of the track team. He died on November 9, 1955, at his home in Rye, New York.
