= 1904 Penn Quakers football team =

American college football season

1904 Penn Quakers football
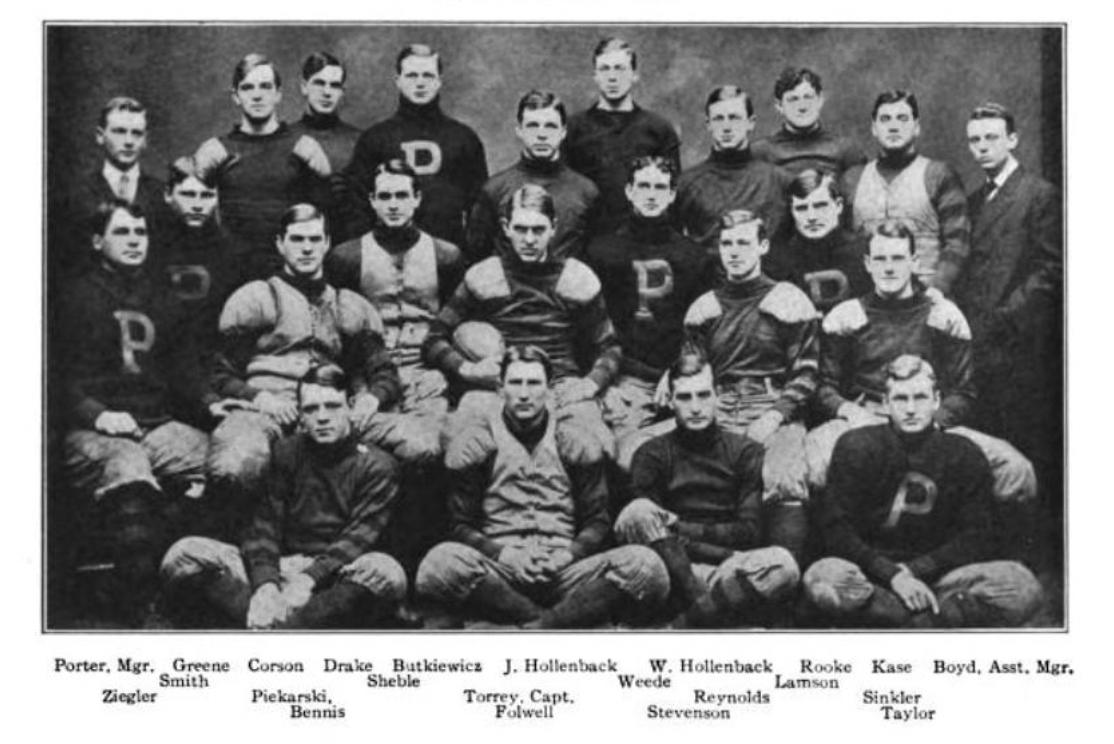

National champion (Helms, Houlgate, Davis) Co-national champion (NCF)
- Conference: Independent
- Record: 12–0
- Head coach: Carl S. Williams (3rd season)
- Captain: Robert Torrey
- Home stadium: Franklin Field

1904 Eastern college football independents records
	Conf.			Overall
Team	W	L	T	W		L		T
Penn		–		12	–	0	–	0
Western U. of Penn.		–		10	–	0	–	0
Dartmouth		–		7	–	0	–	1
Yale		–		10	–	1	–	0
Amherst		–		9	–	1	–	0
Colgate		–		8	–	1	–	1
Carlisle		–		10	–	2	–	0
Lafayette		–		8	–	2	–	0
Princeton		–		8	–	2	–	0
Army		–		7	–	2	–	0
Fordham		–		4	–	1	–	1
Harvard		–		7	–	2	–	1
Dickinson		–		8	–	3	–	1
Columbia		–		7	–	3	–	0
Cornell		–		7	–	3	–	0
Villanova		–		4	–	2	–	1
Syracuse		–		6	–	3	–	0
Swarthmore		–		6	–	3	–	0
Washington & Jefferson		–		5	–	3	–	1
Penn State		–		6	–	4	–	0
Temple		–		3	–	2	–	0
Brown		–		6	–	5	–	0
Bucknell		–		3	–	3	–	0
Springfield Training School		–		4	–	4	–	1
NYU		–		3	–	6	–	0
Holy Cross		–		2	–	5	–	2
Wesleyan		–		3	–	7	–	0
Geneva		–		1	–	4	–	2
Vermont		–		1	–	5	–	2
New Hampshire		–		2	–	5	–	0
Rutgers		–		1	–	6	–	2
Tufts		–		2	–	9	–	1
Lehigh		–		1	–	8	–	0
Franklin & Marshall		–		0	–	10	–	0

The 1904 Penn Quakers football team was an American football team that represented the University of Pennsylvania as an independent during the 1904 college football season. In their third season under head coach Carl S. Williams, the Quakers compiled a 12–0 record, shut out 11 of 12 opponents, and outscored all opponents by a total of 222 to 4.<

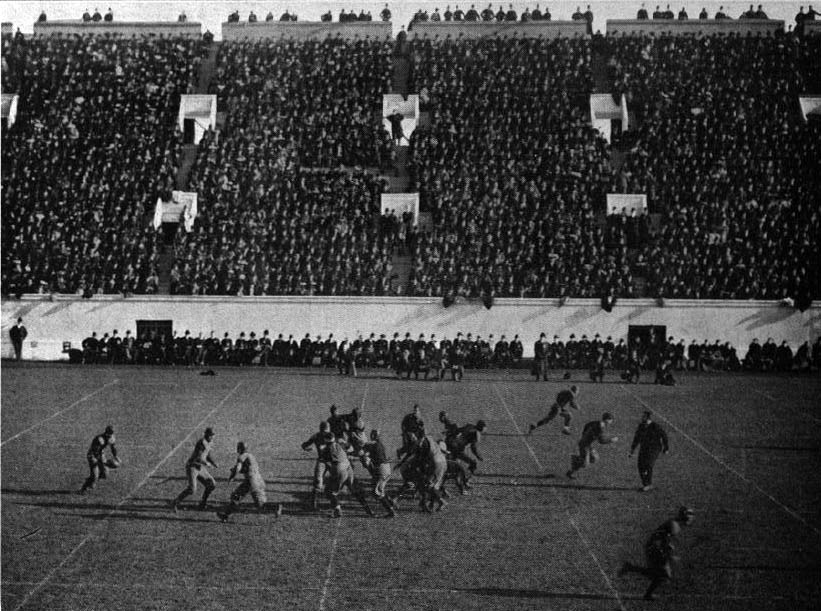
Penn in action (1904)

There was no contemporaneous system in 1904 for determining a national champion. However, Penn was retroactively named as the national champion by the Helms Athletic Foundation, Houlgate System, and Parke H. Davis, and as the co-national champion by the National Championship Foundation.

Three Penn players, quarterback Vince Stevenson, fullback Andy Smith, and guard Frank Piekarski, were consensus picks on the 1904 All-America college football team. Other notable players included halfback Marshall Reynolds, end Garfield Weede, center Robert Grant Torrey, and tackle Thomas Alexander Butkiewicz.

== Schedule ==
Date	Opponent	Site	Result	Attendance	Source
September 24	Penn State	Franklin Field; Philadelphia, PA	W 6–0		
September 28	Swarthmore	Franklin Field; Philadelphia, PA	W 6–4		
October 1	Virginia	Franklin Field; Philadelphia, PA	W 24–0		
October 5	Franklin & Marshall	Franklin Field; Philadelphia, PA	W 34–0		
October 8	Lehigh	Franklin Field; Philadelphia, PA	W 24–0	7,000	
October 12	Gettysburg	Franklin Field; Philadelphia, PA	W 21–0		
October 15	Brown	Franklin Field; Philadelphia, PA	W 6–0		
October 22	Columbia	Franklin Field; Philadelphia, PA	W 16–0	15,000	
October 29	at Harvard	Harvard Stadium; Boston, MA (rivalry)	W 11–0	15,000	
November 5	Lafayette	Franklin Field; Philadelphia, PA	W 22–0	15,000	
November 12	Carlisle	Franklin Field; Philadelphia, PA	W 18–0		
November 24	Cornell	Franklin Field; Philadelphia, PA (rivalry)	W 34–0	> 20,000	
