= 1905 Springfield Training School football team =

American college football season

1905 Springfield Training School football
- Conference: Independent
- Record: 3–5
- Head coach: Charles E. Street (2nd season)
- Captain: Appleton A. Mason

1905 Eastern college football independents records
	Conf.			Overall
Team	W	L	T	W		L		T
Yale		–		10	–	0	–	0
Penn		–		12	–	0	–	1
Temple		–		2	–	0	–	1
Dartmouth		–		7	–	1	–	2
Swarthmore		–		7	–	1	–	0
Western U. of Penn.		–		10	–	2	–	0
Princeton		–		8	–	2	–	0
Harvard		–		8	–	2	–	1
Washington & Jefferson		–		10	–	3	–	0
Lafayette		–		7	–	2	–	1
Wesleyan		–		7	–	2	–	1
Carlisle		–		10	–	4	–	0
Penn State		–		8	–	3	–	0
Syracuse		–		8	–	3	–	0
Fordham		–		5	–	2	–	0
Amherst		–		3	–	1	–	2
Holy Cross		–		6	–	3	–	0
Brown		–		7	–	4	–	0
Tufts		–		5	–	3	–	0
Vermont		–		6	–	4	–	1
Cornell		–		6	–	4	–	0
Colgate		–		5	–	4	–	0
Columbia		–		4	–	3	–	2
Army		–		4	–	4	–	1
Bucknell		–		5	–	5	–	0
Dickinson		–		4	–	4	–	0
NYU		–		3	–	3	–	1
Lehigh		–		6	–	7	–	0
Franklin & Marshall		–		4	–	6	–	0
Geneva		–		4	–	6	–	0
New Hampshire		–		2	–	4	–	2
Springfield Training School		–		3	–	5	–	0
Rutgers		–		3	–	6	–	0
Villanova		–		3	–	7	–	0
Drexel		–		1	–	7	–	0

The 1905 Springfield Training School football team was an American football team that represented the International Young Men's Christian Association Training School—now known as Springfield College–as an independent during the 1905 college football season. Led by second-year head coach Charles E. Street, the team compiled a record of 3–5.

== Schedule ==
Date	Time	Opponent	Site	Result	Attendance	Source
September 23		Connecticut	Springfield, MA	W 21–0		
September 30		Williston Seminary	Springfield, MA	W 10–0		
October 11		at Yale	Yale Field; New Haven, CT	L 0–29		
October 14	3:00 p.m.	at Harvard	Harvard Stadium; Boston, MA	L 0–12	6,000	
October 28		Holy Cross	Springfield, MA	L 0–32		
November 4		at Phillips Academy	Brothers Field; Andover, MA	L 0–16		
November 11	3:00 p.m.	Worcester Tech	Springfield, MA	W 23–5		
November 18		Massachusetts	Springfield, MA	L 0–15		
