= 1909 Fordham Maroon football team =

American college football season

1909 Fordham Maroon football
- Conference: Independent
- Record: 13–2–2 / 5–1–2
- Head coach: Howard Gargan (2nd season)
- Captain: Frank Gargan
- Home stadium: American League Park

1909 Eastern college football independents records
	Conf.			Overall
Team	W	L	T	W		L		T
Yale		–		10	–	0	–	0
Lafayette		–		7	–	0	–	1
Franklin & Marshall		–		9	–	1	–	0
Harvard		–		9	–	1	–	0
Penn State		–		5	–	0	–	2
Washington & Jefferson		–		8	–	1	–	1
Springfield Training School		–		5	–	1	–	0
NYU		–		6	–	1	–	1
Ursinus		–		6	–	1	–	1
Penn		–		7	–	1	–	2
Trinity (CT)		–		6	–	1	–	2
Dartmouth		–		5	–	1	–	2
Fordham		–		5	–	1	–	2
Princeton		–		6	–	2	–	1
Pittsburgh		–		6	–	2	–	1
Carlisle		–		8	–	3	–	1
Colgate		–		5	–	2	–	1
Brown		–		7	–	3	–	1
Geneva		–		4	–	2	–	0
Carnegie Tech		–		5	–	3	–	1
Vermont		–		4	–	2	–	2
Lehigh		–		4	–	3	–	2
Army		–		3	–	2	–	0
Villanova		–		3	–	2	–	0
Dickinson		–		4	–	4	–	1
Syracuse		–		4	–	5	–	1
Bucknell		–		3	–	4	–	2
Boston College		–		3	–	4	–	1
Cornell		–		3	–	4	–	1
New Hampshire		–		3	–	4	–	0
Rhode Island State		–		3	–	4	–	0
Rutgers		–		3	–	5	–	1
Wesleyan		–		3	–	5	–	1
Holy Cross		–		2	–	4	–	2
Swarthmore		–		2	–	5	–	0
Drexel		–		1	–	5	–	3
Tufts		–		2	–	6	–	0
Amherst		–		1	–	6	–	1
Temple		–		0	–	4	–	1

The 1909 Fordham Maroon football team was an American football team that represented Fordham University as an independent during the 1909 college football season. Fordham claims a 13–2–2 record, but Sports Reference LLC and College Football Data Warehouse (CFDW) list the team's record at 5–1–2.

Howard Gargan was the coach for a second and final year, and Frank Gargan was the captain. The team played its home games at American League Park in the Washington Heights neighborhood of Manhattan.

== Schedule ==
The following eight games are reported in Fordham's media guide, CFDW, Sports Reference LLC, and contemporaneous press coverage.

Date	Opponent	Site	Result	Attendance	Source
October 2	at Rutgers	Neilson Field; New Brunswick, NJ	W 9–0		
October 9	at Princeton	Princeton, NJ	L 0–3		
October 16	at Cornell	Percy Field; Ithaca, NY	W 12–6		
October 23	Swarthmore	American League Park; New York, NY	W 21–3		
November 2	at Georgetown	American League Park; New York, NY	T 0–0		
November 13	RPI	American League Park; New York, NY	W 30–0		
November 20	Holy Cross	American League Park; New York, NY	W 9–5		
November 25	Syracuse	American League Park; New York, NY	T 5–5	500	

The following are eight additional games reported in the Fordham media guide.

Date	Opponent	Site	Result
	NYU		W 16–0
	Betts Academy		W 31–0
	Fort Hancock		W 17–0
	Murray Hill Athletic Club		W 21–6
	Webster Academy		W 30–7
	Bedford Athletic Club		L 0–17
	Nutley Athletic Club		W 12–6
	Peekskill Athletic Club		W
	Medics		W 10–0
