= List of Dartmouth Big Green football seasons =

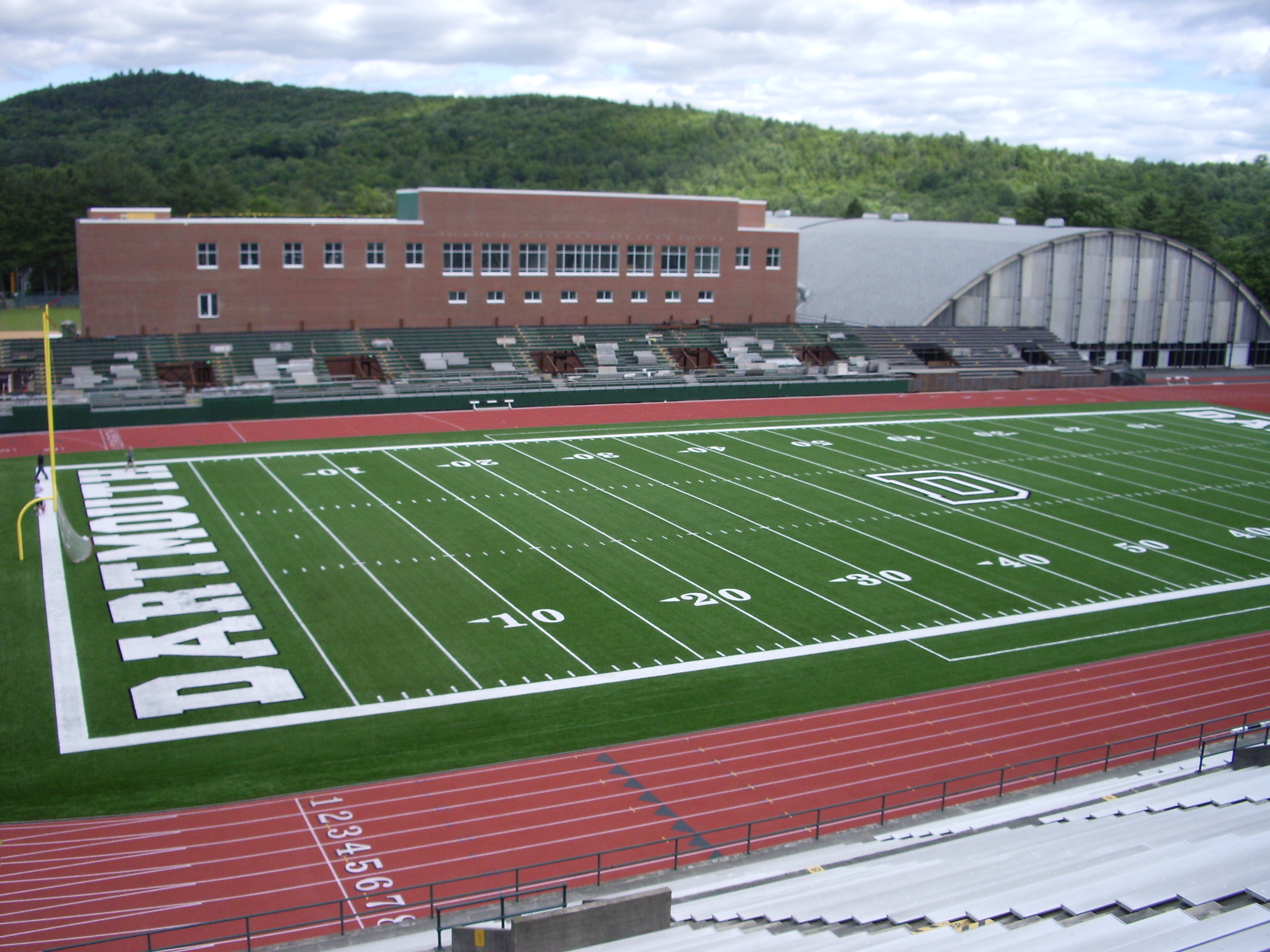
Memorial Field, where the Dartmouth Big Green have played their home games since 1923.

This is a list of seasons completed by the Dartmouth Big Green football team of the National Collegiate Athletic Association (NCAA) Division I Football Championship Subdivision (FCS). Since the team's creation in 1881, the Big Green have participated in more than 1,200 officially sanctioned games, holding an all-time record of 748–475–46. Dartmouth originally competed as a football independent but had stints in the Eastern Intercollegiate Football Association and its successor conference, the Triangular Football League. After spending the first half of the 20th century as an independent school, Dartmouth joined the Ivy League as a founding member in 1956.

== Seasons ==
Year	Coach	Overall	Conference	Standing	Bowl/playoffs	Coaches^{#}	AP^{°}
Independent (1881–1886)
1881	No coach	1–0–1					
1882	No coach	1–1					
1883	No coach	0–1					
1884	No coach	1–2–1					
1885	No team						
1886	No coach	2–2					
Eastern Intercollegiate Football Association (1887–1889)
1887	No coach	3–1–1	1–1	3rd			
1888	No coach	3–4	3–1	T–1st			
1889	No coach	7–1	4–0	1st			
Independent (1890–1892)
1890	No coach	4–4					
1891	No coach	2–2–1					
1892	No coach	5–3					
Wallace Moyle (Triangular Football League) (1893–1894)
1893	Wallace Moyle	4–3	2–0	1st			
1894	Wallace Moyle	5–4	2–0	1st			
William Wurtenburg (Triangular Football League) (1895–1899)
1895	William Wurtenburg	7–5–1	2–0	1st			
1896	William Wurtenburg	5–2–1	2–0	1st			
1897	William Wurtenburg	4–3	2–0	1st			
1898	William Wurtenburg	5–6	2–0	1st			
1899	William Wurtenburg	2–7	0–2	3rd			
Frederick E. Jennings (Independent) (1900)
1900	Frederick E. Jennings	2–4–2					
Walter McCornack (Independent) (1901–1902)
1901	Walter McCornack	9–1					
1902	Walter McCornack	6–2–1					
Fred Folsom (Independent) (1903–1906)
1903	Fred Folsom	9–1					
1904	Fred Folsom	7–0–1					
1905	Fred Folsom	7–1–2					
1906	Fred Folsom	6–3–1					
John C. O'Connor (Independent) (1907–1908)
1907	John C. O'Connor	8–0–1					
1908	John C. O’Connor	6–1–1					
Walter Lillard (Independent) (1909)
1909	Walter Lillard	5–1–2					
W. J. Randall (Independent) (1910)
1910	W. J. Randall	5–2					
Frank Cavanaugh (Independent) (1911–1916)
1911	Frank Cavanaugh	8–2					
1912	Frank Cavanaugh	7–2					
1913	Frank Cavanaugh	7–1					
1914	Frank Cavanaugh	8–1					
1915	Frank Cavanaugh	7–1–1					
1916	Frank Cavanaugh	5–2–2					
Clarence Spears (Independent) (1917–1920)
1917	Clarence Spears	5–3					
1918	Clarence Spears	3–3					
1919	Clarence Spears	6–1–1					
1920	Clarence Spears	7–2					
Jackson Cannell (Independent) (1921–1922)
1921	Jackson Cannell	5–1–1					
1922	Jackson Cannell	6–3					
Jesse Hawley (Independent) (1923–1928)
1923	Jesse Hawley	8–1					
1924	Jesse Hawley	7–0–1					
1925	Jesse Hawley	8–0					
1926	Jesse Hawley	4–4					
1927	Jesse Hawley	7–1					
1928	Jesse Hawley	5–4					
Jackson Cannell (Independent) (1929–1933)
1929	Jackson Cannell	7–2					
1930	Jackson Cannell	7–1–1					
1931	Jackson Cannell	5–3–1					
1932	Jackson Cannell	4–4					
1933	Jackson Cannell	4–4–1					
Earl Blaik (Independent) (1934–1940)
1934	Earl Blaik	6–3					
1935	Earl Blaik	8–2					
1936	Earl Blaik	7–1–1					13
1937	Earl Blaik	7–0–2					7
1938	Earl Blaik	7–2					20
1939	Earl Blaik	5–3–1					
1940	Earl Blaik	5–4					
Tuss McLaughry (Independent) (1941–1942)
1941	Tuss McLaughry	5–4					
1942	Tuss McLaughry	5–4					
Earl Brown (Independent) (1943–1944)
1943	Earl Brown	6–1					16
1944	Earl Brown	2–5–1					
Tuss McLaughry (Independent) (1945–1954)
1945	Tuss McLaughry	1–6–1					
1946	Tuss McLaughry	3–6					
1947	Tuss McLaughry	4–4–1					
1948	Tuss McLaughry	6–2					
1949	Tuss McLaughry	6–2					
1950	Tuss McLaughry	3–5–1					
1951	Tuss McLaughry	4–5					
1952	Tuss McLaughry	2–7					
1953	Tuss McLaughry	2–7					
1954	Tuss McLaughry	3–6					
Bob Blackman (Independent) (1955–1956)
1955	Bob Blackman	3–6					
Bob Blackman (Ivy League) (1956–1970)
1956	Bob Blackman	5–3–1	4–3	T–3rd			
1957	Bob Blackman	7–1–1	5–1–1	2nd			
1958	Bob Blackman	7–2	6–1	1st			
1959	Bob Blackman	5–3–1	5–1–1	2nd			
1960	Bob Blackman	5–4	4–3	T–3rd			
1961	Bob Blackman	6–3	5–2	T–3rd			
1962	Bob Blackman	9–0	7–0	1st			
1963	Bob Blackman	7–2	5–2	T–1st			
1964	Bob Blackman	6–3	4–3	4th			
1965	Bob Blackman	9–0	7–0	1st			
1966	Bob Blackman	7–2	6–1	T–1st			
1967	Bob Blackman	7–2	5–2	2nd			
1968	Bob Blackman	4–5	3–4	5th			
1969	Bob Blackman	8–1	6–1	T–1st			
1970	Bob Blackman	9–0	7–0	1st		14	14
Jake Crouthamel (Ivy League) (1971–1977)
1971	Jake Crouthamel	8–1	6–1	T–1st			
1972	Jake Crouthamel	7–1–1	5–1–1	1st			
1973	Jake Crouthamel	6–3	6–1	1st			
1974	Jake Crouthamel	3–6	3–4	T–5th			
1975	Jake Crouthamel	5–3–1	4–2–1	4th			
1976	Jake Crouthamel	6–3	4–3	T–3rd			
1977	Jake Crouthamel	6–3	4–3	T–3rd			
Joe Yukica (Ivy League) (1978–1986)
1978	Joe Yukica	6–3	6–1	1st			
1979	Joe Yukica	4–4–1	4–3	T–4th			
1980	Joe Yukica	4–6	4–3	T–3rd			
1981	Joe Yukica	6–4	6–1	T–1st			
1982	Joe Yukica	5–5	5–2	T–1st			
1983	Joe Yukica	4–5–1	4–2–1	T–3rd			
1984	Joe Yukica	2–7	2–5	T–6th			
1985	Joe Yukica	2–7–1	2–4–1	6th			
1986	Joe Yukica	3–6–1	3–3–1	4th			
Buddy Teevens (Ivy League) (1987–1991)
1987	Buddy Teevens	2–8	1–6	7th			
1988	Buddy Teevens	5–5	4–3	T–3rd			
1989	Buddy Teevens	5–5	4–3	4th			
1990	Buddy Teevens	7–2–1	6–1	T–1st			17
1991	Buddy Teevens	7–2–1	6–0–1	1st			
John Lyons (Ivy League) (1992–2004)
1992	John Lyons	8–2	6–1	T–1st			
1993	John Lyons	7–3	6–1	2nd			
1994	John Lyons	4–6	2–5	T–7th			
1995	John Lyons	7–2–1	4–2–1	4th			
1996	John Lyons	10–0	7–0	1st			17
1997	John Lyons	8–2	6–1	2nd			
1998	John Lyons	2–8	1–6	T–7th			
1999	John Lyons	2–8	2–5	6th			
2000	John Lyons	2–8	1–6	T–6th			
2001	John Lyons	1–8	1–6	T–7th			
2002	John Lyons	3–7	2–5	T–6th			
2003	John Lyons	5–5	4–3	T–2nd			
2004	John Lyons	1–9	1–6	T–7th			
Buddy Teevens (Ivy League) (2005–2022)
2005	Buddy Teevens	2–8	1–6	7th			
2006	Buddy Teevens	2–8	2–5	T–6th			
2007	Buddy Teevens	3–7	3–4	T–4th			
2008	Buddy Teevens	0–10	0–7	8th			
2009	Buddy Teevens	2–8	2–5	T–6th			
2010	Buddy Teevens	6–4	3–4	5th			
2011	Buddy Teevens	5–5	4–3	T–2nd			
2012	Buddy Teevens	6–4	4–3	T–3rd			
2013	Buddy Teevens	6–4	5–2	3rd			
2014	Buddy Teevens	8–2	6–1	2nd			
2015	Buddy Teevens	9–1	6–1	T–1st		24	23
2016	Buddy Teevens	4–6	1–6	8th			
2017	Buddy Teevens	8–2	5–2	T–2nd			
2018	Buddy Teevens	9–1	6–1	2nd		15	18
2019	Buddy Teevens	9–1	6–1	T–1st		21	22
2020	No team (Note: Dartmouth did not compete during the 2020 season as a result of the COVID-19 pandemic and the subsequent cancellation of the Ivy League season.)						
2021	Buddy Teevens	9–1	6–1	T–1st		23	20
2022	Buddy Teevens	3–7	2–5	T–7th			
Sammy McCorkle (Ivy League) (2023–present)
2023	Sammy McCorkle (Note: Named interim coach for the 2023 season while Buddy Teevens continued his recovery from injuries he suffered in a bicycle accident. Teevens died after the first game of the season.)	6–4	5–2	T–1st			
2024	Sammy McCorkle	8–2	5–2	T–1st			
2025	Sammy McCorkle	7–3	4–3	T–3rd			
Total:		748–475–46					
National championship Conference title Conference division title or championship game berth
^{†}Indicates Bowl Coalition, Bowl Alliance, BCS, or CFP / New Years' Six bowl.; ^{#}Rankings from final Coaches Poll.

== See also ==
- List of Ivy League football standings
- List of Triangular Football League standings
