= 1904 Haverford football team =

American college football season

1904 Haverford football
- Conference: Independent
- Record: 7–1
- Head coach: Norman Thorn (1st season)
- Captain: Hopkins

1904 Eastern college football independents records
	Conf.			Overall
Team	W	L	T	W		L		T
Penn		–		12	–	0	–	0
Western U. of Penn.		–		10	–	0	–	0
Dartmouth		–		7	–	0	–	1
Yale		–		10	–	1	–	0
Amherst		–		9	–	1	–	0
Colgate		–		8	–	1	–	1
Carlisle		–		10	–	2	–	0
Lafayette		–		8	–	2	–	0
Princeton		–		8	–	2	–	0
Army		–		7	–	2	–	0
Fordham		–		4	–	1	–	1
Harvard		–		7	–	2	–	1
Dickinson		–		8	–	3	–	1
Columbia		–		7	–	3	–	0
Cornell		–		7	–	3	–	0
Villanova		–		4	–	2	–	1
Syracuse		–		6	–	3	–	0
Swarthmore		–		6	–	3	–	0
Washington & Jefferson		–		5	–	3	–	1
Penn State		–		6	–	4	–	0
Temple		–		3	–	2	–	0
Brown		–		6	–	5	–	0
Bucknell		–		3	–	3	–	0
Springfield Training School		–		4	–	4	–	1
NYU		–		3	–	6	–	0
Holy Cross		–		2	–	5	–	2
Wesleyan		–		3	–	7	–	0
Geneva		–		1	–	4	–	2
Vermont		–		1	–	5	–	2
New Hampshire		–		2	–	5	–	0
Rutgers		–		1	–	6	–	2
Tufts		–		2	–	9	–	1
Lehigh		–		1	–	8	–	0
Franklin & Marshall		–		0	–	10	–	0

The 1904 Haverford football team was an American football team that represented Haverford College as an independent during the 1904 college football season. The team compiled a 7–1 record and outscored opponents by a total of 144 to 27. Norman Thorn was the head coach.

== Schedule ==
Date	Opponent	Site	Result	Attendance	Source
October 8	Rutgers	Haverford, PA	W 40–0		
October 15	at Lehigh	Bethlehem, PA	W 6–0		
October 21	vs. Germantown Academy	Manheim, PA	W 36–6		
October 29	at Franklin & Marshall	Haverford, PA	W 23–0		
November 5	at NYU	Ohio Field; Bronx, NY	W 34–0		
November 11	Delaware	Haverford, PA	W 17–0		
November 19	at Swarthmore	Whittier Field; Swarthmore, PA (rivalry)	L 6–27	7,000	
