= J. William Williams =

American football player and coach (1880–1908)

Biographical details
- Born: September 12, 1880; Ocean View, Delaware, U.S.
- Died: May 10, 1908 (aged 27); Pueblo, Colorado, U.S.

Playing career
- 1901–1904: Dickinson

Coaching career (HC unless noted)
- 1905–1906: Dickinson

Head coaching record
- Overall: 7–8–2

John William Williams (September 12, 1880 – May 10, 1908) was an American college football player and coach. His was one of the early deaths that was at least partially attributed to injuries incurred from a college football game.

== Playing career ==
Williams played college football at Dickinson College in Carlisle, Pennsylvania from 1901 until 1904, where he was team captain. In 1903, he and his teammates defeated Penn State by a score of 6–0 while completing their season at 7 wins and 5 losses under coach Charles Hutchins As of completion of the 2007 season, Williams still holds the school record for the most touchdowns in a game with five and has several other all-time top achievements, including a 90-yard touchdown return.

== Coaching career ==
After a year of studying law in Virginia, Williams was named the sixth head football coach for his alma mater, Dickinson College and he held that position for two seasons, from 1905 until 1906. His coaching record at Dickinson was 7–8–2.

== Personal life ==
Williams's health deteriorated while coaching and he was forced to resign in the spring of 1907. He returned to his home state of Delaware that summer until the autumn of 1907 working at a local business. It became clear that he was suffering from tuberculosis, and he decided to move west to Pueblo, Colorado. In Colorado, Williams taught physics and chemistry in the local public school system until he died at age twenty seven on May 10, 1908.

== Head coaching record ==
Year	Team	Overall	Conference	Standing	Bowl/playoffs
Dickinson Red and White (Independent) (1905–1906)
1905	Dickinson	4–4			
1906	Dickinson	3–4–2			
Dickinson:		7–8–2			
Total:		7–8–2			
