= 1904 Rutgers Queensmen football team =

American college football season

1904 Rutgers Queensmen football
- Conference: Independent
- Record: 1–6–2
- Head coach: Alfred Ellet Hitchner (1st season)
- Captain: Robert W. Cobb
- Home stadium: Neilson Field

1904 Eastern college football independents records
	Conf.			Overall
Team	W	L	T	W		L		T
Penn		–		12	–	0	–	0
Western U. of Penn.		–		10	–	0	–	0
Dartmouth		–		7	–	0	–	1
Yale		–		10	–	1	–	0
Amherst		–		9	–	1	–	0
Colgate		–		8	–	1	–	1
Carlisle		–		10	–	2	–	0
Lafayette		–		8	–	2	–	0
Princeton		–		8	–	2	–	0
Army		–		7	–	2	–	0
Fordham		–		4	–	1	–	1
Harvard		–		7	–	2	–	1
Dickinson		–		8	–	3	–	1
Columbia		–		7	–	3	–	0
Cornell		–		7	–	3	–	0
Villanova		–		4	–	2	–	1
Syracuse		–		6	–	3	–	0
Swarthmore		–		6	–	3	–	0
Washington & Jefferson		–		5	–	3	–	1
Penn State		–		6	–	4	–	0
Temple		–		3	–	2	–	0
Brown		–		6	–	5	–	0
Bucknell		–		3	–	3	–	0
Springfield Training School		–		4	–	4	–	1
NYU		–		3	–	6	–	0
Holy Cross		–		2	–	5	–	2
Wesleyan		–		3	–	7	–	0
Geneva		–		1	–	4	–	2
Vermont		–		1	–	5	–	2
New Hampshire		–		2	–	5	–	0
Rutgers		–		1	–	6	–	2
Tufts		–		2	–	9	–	1
Lehigh		–		1	–	8	–	0
Franklin & Marshall		–		0	–	10	–	0

The 1904 Rutgers Queensmen football team represented Rutgers University as an independent during the 1904 college football season. In their first and only season under head coach Alfred Ellet Hitchner, the Queensmen compiled a 1–6–2 record and were outscored by their opponents, 202 to 16. The team captain was Robert W. Cobb.

== Schedule ==
Date	Opponent	Site	Result	Source
October 1	at Stevens	Cricket Grounds; Hoboken, NJ	W 4–0	
October 8	at Haverford	Walton Field; Haverford, PA	L 0–40	
October 15	Ursinus	Neilson Field; New Brunswick, NJ	L 0–37	
October 22	at Wesleyan	Andrus Field; Middletown, CT	L 0–39	
October 29	at Union (NY)	Schenectady, NY	L 0–35	
November 5	Delaware	Neilson Field; New Brunswick, NJ	T 6–6	
November 8	at NYU	Ohio Field; Bronx, NY	L 6–35	
November 12	University of Maryland, Baltimore	Neilson Field; New Brunswick, NJ	L 0–10	
November 19	Stevens	Neilson Field; New Brunswick, NJ	T 0–0	
