= Paul G. Smith =

American football and baseball coach (1882–1971)

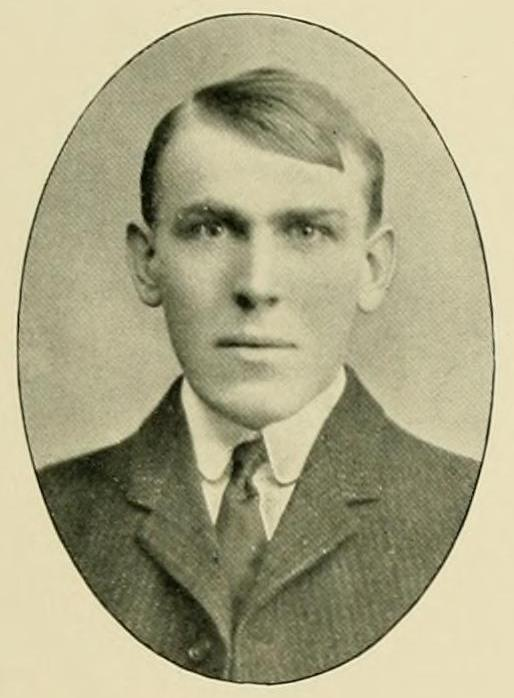
- Smith's senior portrait in L'Agenda 1905, Bucknell yearbook

Biographical details
- Born: December 15, 1881; Harrisburg, Pennsylvania, U.S.
- Died: September 1971 (aged 89); Harrisburg, Pennsylvania, U.S.
- Education: Bucknell University (1905)

Coaching career (HC unless noted)

Football
- 1908: Bucknell
- 1909: Dickinson

Baseball
- 1908: Bucknell

Head coaching record
- Overall: 6–9–3 (football); 10–8 (baseball)

Paul Garfield Smith (December 15, 1882 – September 1971) was an American college football and college baseball coach from Harrisburg, Pennsylvania.

== Biography ==
Smith served as the head football coach for Bucknell University in 1908 and at Dickinson College in 1909, compiling a career college football coaching record of 6–9–3. Smith was also the head baseball coach at Bucknell in 1908, tallying a mark of 10–8.

During the 1918 and 1919, high school football seasons, he coached Harrisburg Technical High School to 21 undefeated wins.

He later worked as an attorney and judge, at one point serving as the president judge of the Dauphin County Court.

== Head coaching record ==
=== Football ===
Year	Team	Overall	Conference	Standing	Bowl/playoffs
Bucknell (Independent) (1908)
1908	Bucknell	3–5–2			
Bucknell:		3–5–2			
Dickinson Red and White (Independent) (1909)
1909	Dickinson	3–4–1			
Bucknell:		3–4–1			
Total:		6–9–3			
