= 1909 Holy Cross football team =

American college football season

1909 Holy Cross football
- Conference: Independent
- Record: 2–4–2
- Head coach: Timothy F. Larkin (3rd season)
- Captain: Edward F. Sweeney
- Home stadium: Fitton Field

1909 Eastern college football independents records
	Conf.			Overall
Team	W	L	T	W		L		T
Yale		–		10	–	0	–	0
Lafayette		–		7	–	0	–	1
Franklin & Marshall		–		9	–	1	–	0
Harvard		–		9	–	1	–	0
Penn State		–		5	–	0	–	2
Washington & Jefferson		–		8	–	1	–	1
Springfield Training School		–		5	–	1	–	0
NYU		–		6	–	1	–	1
Ursinus		–		6	–	1	–	1
Penn		–		7	–	1	–	2
Trinity (CT)		–		6	–	1	–	2
Dartmouth		–		5	–	1	–	2
Fordham		–		5	–	1	–	2
Princeton		–		6	–	2	–	1
Pittsburgh		–		6	–	2	–	1
Carlisle		–		8	–	3	–	1
Colgate		–		5	–	2	–	1
Brown		–		7	–	3	–	1
Geneva		–		4	–	2	–	0
Carnegie Tech		–		5	–	3	–	1
Vermont		–		4	–	2	–	2
Lehigh		–		4	–	3	–	2
Army		–		3	–	2	–	0
Villanova		–		3	–	2	–	0
Dickinson		–		4	–	4	–	1
Syracuse		–		4	–	5	–	1
Bucknell		–		3	–	4	–	2
Boston College		–		3	–	4	–	1
Cornell		–		3	–	4	–	1
New Hampshire		–		3	–	4	–	0
Rhode Island State		–		3	–	4	–	0
Rutgers		–		3	–	5	–	1
Wesleyan		–		3	–	5	–	1
Holy Cross		–		2	–	4	–	2
Swarthmore		–		2	–	5	–	0
Drexel		–		1	–	5	–	3
Tufts		–		2	–	6	–	0
Amherst		–		1	–	6	–	1
Temple		–		0	–	4	–	1

The 1909 Holy Cross football team was an American football team that represented the College of the Holy Cross in the 1909 college football season.

In its third year under head coach Timothy F. Larkin, the team compiled a 2–4–2 record. Edward F. Sweeney was the team captain.

Holy Cross played its home games at Fitton Field on the college campus in Worcester, Massachusetts.

== Schedule ==
Date	Opponent	Site	Result	Attendance	Source
September 25	Norwich	Fitton Field; Worcester, MA	W 18–0		
October 2	New Hampshire	Fitton Field; Worcester, MA	W 13–0		
October 6	at Yale	Yale Field; New Haven, CT	L 0–12	3,000	
October 16	Trinity (CT)	Fitton Field; Worcester, MA	T 5–5		
October 23	Bowdoin	Fitton Field; Worcester, MA	L 0–5		
October 30	at Dartmouth	Alumni Oval; Hanover, NH	L 0–12		
November 13	Worcester Tech	Fitton Field; Worcester, MA	T 0–0		
November 20	at Fordham	American League Park; New York, NY (rivalry)	L 5–9	4,000	
