= 1909 Franklin & Marshall Nevonians football team =

American college football season

1909 Franklin & Marshall Nevonians football
- Conference: Independent
- Record: 9–1
- Head coach: Jack Hollenback (2nd season)
- Captain: O. Webster Saylor

1909 Eastern college football independents records
	Conf.			Overall
Team	W	L	T	W		L		T
Yale		–		10	–	0	–	0
Lafayette		–		7	–	0	–	1
Franklin & Marshall		–		9	–	1	–	0
Harvard		–		9	–	1	–	0
Penn State		–		5	–	0	–	2
Washington & Jefferson		–		8	–	1	–	1
Springfield Training School		–		5	–	1	–	0
NYU		–		6	–	1	–	1
Ursinus		–		6	–	1	–	1
Penn		–		7	–	1	–	2
Trinity (CT)		–		6	–	1	–	2
Dartmouth		–		5	–	1	–	2
Fordham		–		5	–	1	–	2
Princeton		–		6	–	2	–	1
Pittsburgh		–		6	–	2	–	1
Carlisle		–		8	–	3	–	1
Colgate		–		5	–	2	–	1
Brown		–		7	–	3	–	1
Geneva		–		4	–	2	–	0
Carnegie Tech		–		5	–	3	–	1
Vermont		–		4	–	2	–	2
Lehigh		–		4	–	3	–	2
Army		–		3	–	2	–	0
Villanova		–		3	–	2	–	0
Dickinson		–		4	–	4	–	1
Syracuse		–		4	–	5	–	1
Bucknell		–		3	–	4	–	2
Boston College		–		3	–	4	–	1
Cornell		–		3	–	4	–	1
New Hampshire		–		3	–	4	–	0
Rhode Island State		–		3	–	4	–	0
Rutgers		–		3	–	5	–	1
Wesleyan		–		3	–	5	–	1
Holy Cross		–		2	–	4	–	2
Swarthmore		–		2	–	5	–	0
Drexel		–		1	–	5	–	3
Tufts		–		2	–	6	–	0
Amherst		–		1	–	6	–	1
Temple		–		0	–	4	–	1

The 1909 Franklin & Marshall Nevonians football team was an American football team that represented Franklin & Marshall College during the 1909 college football season. The team compiled a 9–1 record. Jack Hollenback, a former Penn player, was the team's head coach. O. Webster Saylor was the team captain and played at the tackle position.

== Schedule ==
Date	Time	Opponent	Site	Result	Attendance	Source
September 25		Steelton Athletic Club	Lancaster, PA	W 26–0		
October 2		at Lehigh	Bethlehem, PA	W 10–0		
October 9		at Swarthmore	Swarthmore, PA (rivalry)	W 5–0		
October 16		Rutgers	Lancaster, PA	W 15–0		
October 23		Haverford	Lancaster, PA	W 12–5		
October 30		at Muhlenberg	Allentown, PA	W 33–0		
November 6	3:00 p.m.	at Carnegie Tech	Leeds Field; Pittsburgh, PA	L 5–11	5,000	
November 13		Susquehanna	Lancaster, PA	W 56–5		
November 20		Delaware	Lancaster, PA	W 23–0		
November 25		Gettysburg	Lancaster, PA (rivalry)	W 16–3		
