= Alfred Ellet Hitchner =

American football player, coach, electrical engineer and businessman

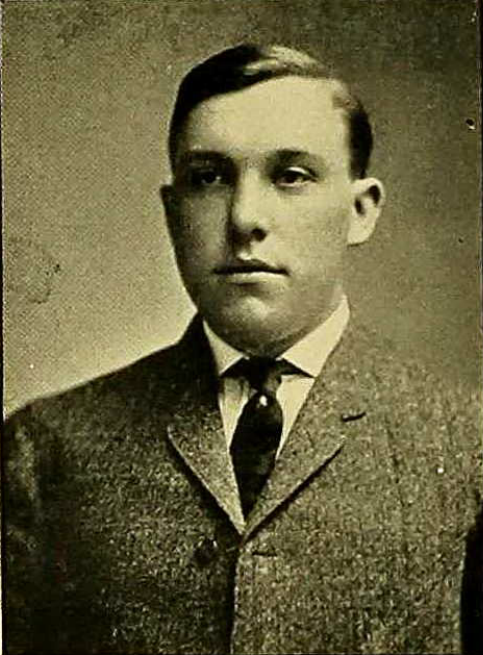
- Hitchner from The Scarlet Letter, 1905

Biographical details
- Born: December 11, 1882; New Jersey, U.S.
- Died: December 16, 1959 (aged 77); California, U.S.

Playing career
- 1902–1903: Rutgers
- Positions: Tackle, end

Coaching career (HC unless noted)
- 1904: Rutgers

Head coaching record
- Overall: 1–6

Alfred Ellet Hitchner (December 11, 1882 – December 16, 1959) was an American football player, coach, electrical engineer and businessman. He was the head coach of the Rutgers Scarlet Knights football team in 1904. He later worked for many years for Westinghouse Electric Company in Pennsylvania and California.

== Early years ==
Hitchner was born in New Jersey in 1882 and raised in Bridgeton, New Jersey. He attended Rutgers University and graduated in 1904 with a Bachelor of Science degree. While attending Rutgers, he was a member of the Zeta Psi fraternity and the Cap and Skull Secret Honor Society. He also played at the right tackle and right end positions for the Rutgers Scarlet Knights football team in 1902 and 1903.

== Football coach ==
After graduating from Rutgers, he was hired as the school's head football coach for the 1904 season. In his one season as the head coach, the Rutgers football team compiled a record of 1–6.

== Engineering and professional career ==
After his coaching career, Hitchner spent two years working in an apprenticeship with the Baldwin Locomotive Works and three years with the Link-Belt Co. on construction projects.

In 1909, he began a long association with the Westinghouse Electric and Manufacturing Co. He began work for Westinghouse as an industrial salesman in Philadelphia. At the time of the 1910 United States Census, he was living in Philadelphia and working as an electrical engineer. In 1912, he became a sales representative in the Pennsylvania coal fields and as manager of the office in Wilkes-Barre, Pennsylvania. In a draft registration card completed in 1918, Hitchner indicated that he was living in Luzerne, Pennsylvania, and was employed by Westinghouse in Wilkes-Barre. In 1919, Hitchner became the manager of the Westinghouse's mining section of the Industrial Sales Department in East Pittsburgh.

Hitchens moved to southern California in 1926. He became the Los Angeles district manager for Westinghouse Electric and Manufacturing Co. In 1942, he was promoted to assistant to the manager of Westinghouse.

== Family and death ==
Hitchner was married. He and his wife Susan had two daughters, Susan and Ellen. At the time of the 1920 United States Census, he was living in Wilkinsburg, Pennsylvania, with his wife and two daughters. At the time of the 1930 United States Census, he was living in South Pasadena, California with his wife and two daughters. At the time of the 1940 Census, he was still living in South Pasadena with his wife Susan and daughter Ellen.

Hitchner died in California in December 1959. He was buried at Forest Lawn Memorial Park in Glendale, California.

== Head coaching record ==
Year	Team	Overall	Conference	Standing	Bowl/playoffs
Rutgers Queensmen (Independent) (1904)
1904	Rutgers	1–6			
Rutgers:		1–6			
Total:		1–6			
