= Howard Gargan =

American football player and coach (1886–1945)

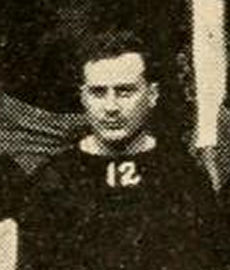
- Gargan, c. 1912, at Rutgers

Biographical details
- Born: December 12, 1886; New York, New York, U.S.
- Died: January 21, 1945 (aged 58); New York, New York, U.S.

Playing career

Football
- 1906–1907: Fordham

Baseball
- ?–1908: Fordham
- Positions: Halfback (football); First baseman (baseball)

Coaching career (HC unless noted)

Football
- 1908–1909: Fordham
- 1910–1912: Rutgers

Head coaching record
- Overall: 22–12–6

Howard Matthew Gargan (December 12, 1886 – January 21, 1945) was an American college football player and coach. He served as the head football coach at Fordham University from 1908 to 1909 and at Rutgers University from 1910 to 1912, compiling a career head coaching record of 22–12–6.

Gargan played football at Fordham as a halfback and was captain of the 1907 Fordham football team. He also played baseball at Fordham as a first baseman, captaining the 1908 team with Cofley and Mahoney.

In 1917, he joined the United States Army but did not see combat in Europe during World War I. He attained the rank of captain and resigned from the Army in 1927, having served at Fort Riley in Kansas and Fort Dix in New Jersey.

== Head coaching record ==
Year	Team	Overall	Conference	Standing	Bowl/playoffs
Fordham Maroon (Independent) (1908–1909)
1908	Fordham	5–1			
1909	Fordham	5–1–2			
Rutgers:		10–2–2			
Rutgers Queensmen (Independent) (1910–1912)
1910	Rutgers	3–2–3			
1911	Rutgers	4–4–1			
1912	Rutgers	5–4			
Rutgers:		12–10–4			
Total:		22–12–6			
