= Edwin N. Snitjer =

American football player and coach (1878–1948)

Biographical details
- Born: September 30, 1878; St. Louis Missouri, U.S.
- Died: January 31, 1948 (aged 69); Los Angeles, California, U.S.

Playing career
- 1899: Yale
- Position: End

Coaching career (HC unless noted)
- c. 1901–1905: Allegheny Prep (PA)
- 1908: Carnegie Tech (assistant)
- 1909: Carnegie Tech
- 1916: Saint Mary's (assistant)

Head coaching record
- Overall: 5–3–1 (college)

Edwin Newton "Ted" Snitjer (September 30, 1878 – January 31, 1948) was an American football player and coach. He served as the head football coach at the Carnegie Institute of Technology—now known as Carnegie Mellon University—for one season, in 1909, compiling a record of 5–3–1. Snitjer attended Yale University, where played football for the 1899 Yale Bulldogs football team as an end before graduating in 1900. He coached at Allegheny Prep and then was an assistant coach at Carnegie Tech in 1908 under William F. Knox. In 1916, Snitjer joined the coaching staff at Saint Mary's College of California to assist head football coach David C. MacAndrew.

Snitjer died on January 31, 1948, in Los Angeles, California, following a heart attack.

== Head coaching record ==
=== College ===
Year	Team	Overall	Conference	Standing	Bowl/playoffs
Carnegie Tech Tartans (Independent) (1909)
1909	Carnegie Tech	5–3–1			
Carnegie Tech:		5–3–1			
Total:		5–3–1			
