= 1904 Lehigh Brown and White football team =

American college football season

1904 Lehigh Brown and White football
- Conference: Independent
- Record: 1–8
- Head coach: Samuel B. Newton (3rd season)
- Home stadium: Lehigh Field

1904 Eastern college football independents records
	Conf.			Overall
Team	W	L	T	W		L		T
Penn		–		12	–	0	–	0
Western U. of Penn.		–		10	–	0	–	0
Dartmouth		–		7	–	0	–	1
Yale		–		10	–	1	–	0
Amherst		–		9	–	1	–	0
Colgate		–		8	–	1	–	1
Carlisle		–		10	–	2	–	0
Lafayette		–		8	–	2	–	0
Princeton		–		8	–	2	–	0
Army		–		7	–	2	–	0
Fordham		–		4	–	1	–	1
Harvard		–		7	–	2	–	1
Dickinson		–		8	–	3	–	1
Columbia		–		7	–	3	–	0
Cornell		–		7	–	3	–	0
Villanova		–		4	–	2	–	1
Syracuse		–		6	–	3	–	0
Swarthmore		–		6	–	3	–	0
Washington & Jefferson		–		5	–	3	–	1
Penn State		–		6	–	4	–	0
Temple		–		3	–	2	–	0
Brown		–		6	–	5	–	0
Bucknell		–		3	–	3	–	0
Springfield Training School		–		4	–	4	–	1
NYU		–		3	–	6	–	0
Holy Cross		–		2	–	5	–	2
Wesleyan		–		3	–	7	–	0
Geneva		–		1	–	4	–	2
Vermont		–		1	–	5	–	2
New Hampshire		–		2	–	5	–	0
Rutgers		–		1	–	6	–	2
Tufts		–		2	–	9	–	1
Lehigh		–		1	–	8	–	0
Frankin & Marshall		–		0	–	10	–	0

The 1904 Lehigh Brown and White football team was an American football team that represented Lehigh University as an independent during the 1904 college football season. In its third season under head coach Samuel B. Newton, the team compiled a 1–8 record and outscored opponents by a total of 236 to 52.

== Schedule ==
Date	Opponent	Site	Result	Attendance	Source
September 24	Albright	South Bethlehem, PA	W 37–0		
October 1	Swarthmore	South Bethlehem, PA	L 0–20		
October 8	at Penn	Franklin Field; Philadelphia, PA	L 0–24	7,000	
October 15	Haverford	South Bethlehem, PA	L 0–6		
October 26	at Princeton	University Field; Princeton, NJ	L 0–60		
October 29	Dickinson	Lehigh Field; South Bethlehem, PA	L 0–6		
November 5	at Cornell	Percy Field; Ithaca, NY	L 5–50		
November 12	at Syracuse	Syracuse, NY	L 4–30		
November 24	at Lafayette	March Field; Easton, PA (rivalry)	L 6–40		
