= Harry Howard Cloudman =

American physician

Harry Cloudman
Biographical details
- Born: October 22, 1877; Gorham, Maine, U.S.
- Died: December 11, 1950 (aged 73); Portland, Maine, U.S.

Playing career

Football
- 1897–1900: Bowdoin

Coaching career (HC unless noted)

Football
- 1901: Bowdoin
- 1902–1904: Vermont
- 1909–1911: Oklahoma City HS (OK)

Track
- 1902–1908: Vermont

Harry Howard Cloudman (October 22, 1877 – December 11, 1950) was an American physician, track and field athlete, and coach of American football. He served as the head football coach at Bowdoin College in 1901 and the University of Vermont from 1902 to 1904.

Cloudman ran track at Bowdoin before graduating in 1901. He set a Maine state record for the 100-yard dash in 1899 at an intercollegiate meet in Waterville. Cloudman earned a medical degree from the University of Vermont College of Medicine—now known as the Robert Larner College of Medicine—in 1905. He died on December 11, 1950, in Portland, Maine.
