= Charles P. Hutchins =

American football coach (1872–1938)

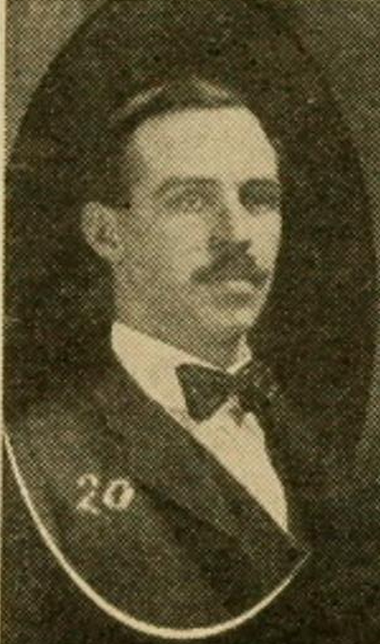
- Hutchins pictured c. 1906 at Wisconsin

Biographical details
- Born: September 10, 1872; Brooklyn, New York, U.S.
- Died: December 28, 1938 (aged 66); Syracuse, New York, U.S.

Coaching career (HC unless noted)

Football
- 1902–1903: Dickinson
- 1904–1905: Syracuse
- 1906–1907: Wisconsin

Baseball
- 1907: Wisconsin

Administrative career (AD unless noted)
- 1911–1913: Indiana

Head coaching record
- Overall: 33–17–1 (football)

Accomplishments and honors

Championships
- 1 Western (1906)

Charles Pelton Hutchins (September 10, 1872 – December 28, 1938) was an American college football and college baseball coach and athletics administrator. He served as the head football coach at Dickinson College (1902–1903), Syracuse University (1904–1905), and University of Wisconsin–Madison (1906–1907), compiling a career college football coaching record of 33–17–1. From 1904 to 1905, he coached at Syracuse, tallying a 14–6 record. From 1906 to 1907, he coached at Wisconsin, where he compiled an 8–1–1 record. Hutchins was also the athletic director at Indiana University Bloomington from 1911 to 1913.

== Head coaching record ==
=== Football ===
Year	Team	Overall	Conference	Standing	Bowl/playoffs
Dickinson Red and White (Independent) (1902–1903)
1902	Dickinson	4–6			
1903	Dickinson	7–5			
Dickinson:		11–10			
Syracuse Orangemen (Independent) (1904–1905)
1904	Syracuse	6–3			
1905	Syracuse	8–3			
Syracuse:		14–6			
Wisconsin Badgers (Western Conference) (1906–1907)
1906	Wisconsin	5–0	3–0	T–1st	
1907	Wisconsin	3–1–1	3–1–1	2nd	
Wisconsin:		8–1–1	6–1–1		
Total:		33–17–1			
