= O. Webster Saylor =

American football and basketball coach (1887–1971)

Biographical details
- Born: August 15, 1887; Johnstown, Pennsylvania, U.S.
- Died: March 7, 1971 (aged 83); Ebensburg, Pennsylvania, U.S.

Playing career

Football
- 1909: Franklin & Marshall
- Position: Tackle

Coaching career (HC unless noted)

Football
- 1916: Franklin & Marshall

Basketball
- 1916–1917: Franklin & Marshall

Head coaching record
- Overall: 1–7 (football); 4–8 (basketball)

Owen Webster Saylor (August 15, 1887 – March 7, 1971) was an American football and basketball coach.

== Coaching career ==
Saylor was the head football coach at Franklin & Marshall College in Lancaster, Pennsylvania for one season in 1916, compiling a record of 1–7.

== Later life ==
Saylor later served as mayor of Johnstown, Pennsylvania, elected in 1930 to fill the unexpired term of mayor Joseph Cauffield, who was removed from the post for misconduct.

== Head coaching record ==
=== Football ===
Year	Team	Overall	Conference	Standing	Bowl/playoffs
Franklin & Marshall (Independent) (1916)
1916	Franklin & Marshall	1–7			
Franklin & Marshall:		1–7			
Total:		1–7			
