= W. H. Lillard =

American football coach and educator (1881–1967)

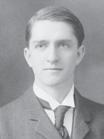
- Lillard as Dartmouth coach in 1909

Biographical details
- Born: November 20, 1881; Paris, Illinois, U.S.
- Died: June 30, 1967 (aged 85); Boston, Massachusetts, U.S.

Playing career
- 1903–1904: Dartmouth
- Position: Left end

Coaching career (HC unless noted)
- 1905–1906: Dartmouth (assistant)
- 1907–1908: Andover
- 1909: Dartmouth
- 1910–1915: Andover

Head coaching record
- Overall: 5–1–2 (college)

Walter Huston "Cappy" Lillard (November 20, 1881 – June 30, 1967) was an American football coach and educator. He coached the Dartmouth College football team for one season in 1909 and amassed a 5–1–2 record. Lillard taught English and coached football at Phillips Academy, Andover, and later became the headmaster of the Tabor Academy.

== Early life ==
Lillard was born on November 20, 1881, in Paris, Illinois. He attended Dartmouth College and graduated in 1905. Lillard played on the football team as a left end and earned varsity letters in 1903 and 1904. The Dartmouth wrote that "Lillard, though an exceedingly light man for college football, was enabled to hold an end position on several of the strongest teams ever representing the Green." Lillard was a player on the 1903 team, which was the first in school history to defeat Harvard. He graduated from Dartmouth in 1905.

== Professional career ==
=== Andover ===
Upon graduation, Lillard served as an assistant coach at Dartmouth in 1905 and 1906. In 1907, the preparatory school Phillips Academy, Andover hired Lillard as an English instructor and head football coach, which made him the first faculty member to serve as a head coach, ending the school practice of hiring professionals. His appointment was praised by the Andover faculty which blamed the professional coaches for "illegal recruiting, and the commercialism which had crept into college athletics, particularly football." He coached Andover again the following year, before his team's success on the gridiron attracted the attention of his alma mater.

=== Dartmouth coach ===
In December 1908, the Dartmouth athletic council selected the football staff which consisted of four graduates: W. J. Randall (1896), Leigh Turner (1901), and Joseph T. Gilman (1905), and Lillard, who was chosen as the head coach. He also took direct responsibility for the ends. Lillard took a leave of absence from Andover to attend graduate school at Oxford University in England and then to coach at Dartmouth during the 1909 football season. During his tenure, the Green compiled a 5–1–2 record.

=== Return to Andover ===
Lillard received his A.M. from Dartmouth in 1910. That year, he returned to coach and teach at Andover, where he remained at least through 1915. In 1911, he helped implement a new school policy which required every student to participate in some form of athletics, including intramural competition. Lillard told a New York Times reporter:

"We had genuine satisfaction at Andover in seeing the bleachers empty and the fields covered with boys having a mighty good time. The new plan as compared with the old gave each individual four times as much actual playing in games, but of course not the same kind of experience that comes with meeting an unknown opponent."

Lillard went on to praise the widespread participation in sports at English universities, and said virtually all of their students competed in rugby, soccer, lacrosse, or rowing. Lillard contrasted this situation with the one at American universities, where, he noted, "about 100 picked men play ... surrounded by a large body of 2,000 rooters. To make the situation worse, these American athletes are playing in a spotlight of publicity, especially the demigods of the 'Varsity."

=== Tabor Academy headmaster ===
In 1916, Lillard was hired as the principal of Tabor Academy in Marion, Massachusetts. During his tenure, Tabor Academy's enrollment increased tenfold. Lillard resigned from the post in 1942.

In 1963, Lillard published a book, Courage on the Danube, which documented the Warsaw Uprising. He died of a heart ailment on June 30, 1967, in the New England Medical Center in Boston at the age of 85.

== Head coaching record ==
=== College ===
Year	Team	Overall	Conference	Standing	Bowl/playoffs
Dartmouth (Independent) (1909)
1909	Dartmouth	5–1–2			
Dartmouth:		5–1–2			
Total:		5–1–2			
