= 1909 Carnegie Tech Tartans football team =

American college football season

1909 Carnegie Tech Tartans football
- Conference: Independent
- Record: 5–3–1
- Head coach: Edwin N. Snitjer (1st season)
- Captain: Billy Hittner
- Home stadium: Leeds Field

1909 Eastern college football independents records
| | Conf. | | | Overall |
| Team | W | L | T | W | | L | | T |
|---|---|---|---|---|---|---|---|---|
| Yale | | – | | 10 | – | 0 | – | 0 |
| Lafayette | | – | | 7 | – | 0 | – | 1 |
| Franklin & Marshall | | – | | 9 | – | 1 | – | 0 |
| Harvard | | – | | 9 | – | 1 | – | 0 |
| Penn State | | – | | 5 | – | 0 | – | 2 |
| Washington & Jefferson | | – | | 8 | – | 1 | – | 1 |
| Springfield Training School | | – | | 5 | – | 1 | – | 0 |
| NYU | | – | | 6 | – | 1 | – | 1 |
| Ursinus | | – | | 6 | – | 1 | – | 1 |
| Penn | | – | | 7 | – | 1 | – | 2 |
| Trinity (CT) | | – | | 6 | – | 1 | – | 2 |
| Dartmouth | | – | | 5 | – | 1 | – | 2 |
| Fordham | | – | | 5 | – | 1 | – | 2 |
| Princeton | | – | | 6 | – | 2 | – | 1 |
| Pittsburgh | | – | | 6 | – | 2 | – | 1 |
| Carlisle | | – | | 8 | – | 3 | – | 1 |
| Colgate | | – | | 5 | – | 2 | – | 1 |
| Brown | | – | | 7 | – | 3 | – | 1 |
| Geneva | | – | | 4 | – | 2 | – | 0 |
| Carnegie Tech | | – | | 5 | – | 3 | – | 1 |
| Vermont | | – | | 4 | – | 2 | – | 2 |
| Lehigh | | – | | 4 | – | 3 | – | 2 |
| Army | | – | | 3 | – | 2 | – | 0 |
| Villanova | | – | | 3 | – | 2 | – | 0 |
| Dickinson | | – | | 4 | – | 4 | – | 1 |
| Syracuse | | – | | 4 | – | 5 | – | 1 |
| Bucknell | | – | | 3 | – | 4 | – | 2 |
| Boston College | | – | | 3 | – | 4 | – | 1 |
| Cornell | | – | | 3 | – | 4 | – | 1 |
| New Hampshire | | – | | 3 | – | 4 | – | 0 |
| Rhode Island State | | – | | 3 | – | 4 | – | 0 |
| Rutgers | | – | | 3 | – | 5 | – | 1 |
| Wesleyan | | – | | 3 | – | 5 | – | 1 |
| Holy Cross | | – | | 2 | – | 4 | – | 2 |
| Swarthmore | | – | | 2 | – | 5 | – | 0 |
| Drexel | | – | | 1 | – | 5 | – | 3 |
| Tufts | | – | | 2 | – | 6 | – | 0 |
| Amherst | | – | | 1 | – | 6 | – | 1 |
| Temple | | – | | 0 | – | 4 | – | 1 |

The 1909 Carnegie Tech Tartans football team represented the Carnegie Institute of Technology—now known as Carnegie Mellon University—as an independent during the 1909 college football season. Led by Edwin N. Snitjer in his first and only season as head coach, Carnegie Tech compiled a record of 5–3–1.

== Schedule ==
| Date | Time | Opponent | Site | Result | Attendance | Source |
|---|---|---|---|---|---|---|
| October 2 | | Westminster (PA) | Leeds Field; Pittsburgh, PA | W 12–0 | | |
| October 9 | 4:00 p.m. | Waynesburg | Leeds Field; Pittsburgh, PA | W 18–0 | 3,000 | |
| October 16 | 3:00 p.m. | Western Reserve | Leeds Field; Pittsburgh, PA | W 6–5 | 3,000 | |
| October 23 | 3:00 p.m. | Denison | Leeds Field; Pittsburgh, PA | T 0–0 | | |
| October 30 | 3:00 p.m. | Lehigh | Leeds Field; Pittsburgh, PA | L 11–18 | | |
| November 6 | 3:00 p.m. | Franklin & Marshall | Leeds Field; Pittsburgh, PA | W 11–5 | 5,000 | |
| November 13 | | at Marietta | Marietta, OH | L 0–13 | 2,000 | |
| November 20 | | at Allegheny | Meadville, PA | W 10–0 | | |
| November 25 | 3:00 p.m. | Colgate | Leeds Field; Pittsburgh, PA | L 6–38 | | |
All times are in Eastern time
