= Dickinson Red and White football, 1900–1909 =

American college football season

1900–1909 Dickinson Red and White football
- Conference: Independent
- Head coach: Multiple

The Dickinson Red and White football program, 1900–1909 represented Dickinson College as an independent in college football during the 1900s. The program was led by multiple head coaches during the decade. The program had three winning seasons during the decade:

- The 1903 team compiled a 7–5 record and outscored opponents by a total of 156 to 78. It was the program's second and final year uner head coach Charles P. Hutchins.
- The 1904 team compiled an 8–3–1 record and outscored opponents by a total of 219 to 53. It was the program's only season under head coach Forrest Craver.
- In their first season under head coach Paul J. Davis, the 1908 team compiled a 5–4 record and was outscored by a total of 77 to 69.

== 1900 ==
1900 Dickinson Red and White football
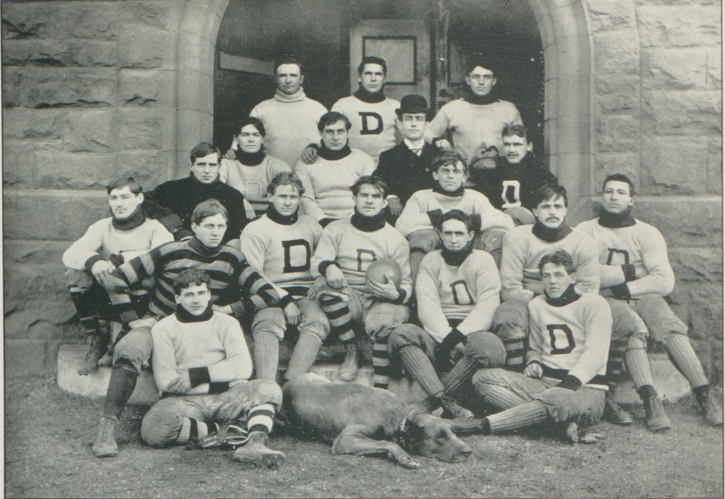
- Conference: Independent
- Record: 5–5
- Head coach: Sam Boyle (1st season)

1900 Eastern college football independents records
	Conf.			Overall
Team	W	L	T	W		L		T
Yale		–		12	–	0	–	0
Penn		–		12	–	1	–	0
Harvard		–		10	–	1	–	0
Cornell		–		10	–	2	–	0
Geneva		–		5	–	1	–	1
Lafayette		–		9	–	2	–	0
Syracuse		–		7	–	2	–	1
Princeton		–		8	–	3	–	0
Drexel		–		5	–	2	–	0
Fordham		–		3	–	1	–	1
Army		–		7	–	3	–	1
Brown		–		7	–	3	–	1
Columbia		–		7	–	3	–	1
Villanova		–		5	–	2	–	2
Washington & Jefferson		–		6	–	3	–	1
Swarthmore		–		6	–	3	–	2
Holy Cross		–		5	–	3	–	1
Carlisle		–		6	–	4	–	1
Buffalo		–		3	–	2	–	2
Western Univ. of Penn		–		5	–	4	–	0
Bucknell		–		4	–	4	–	1
Dickinson		–		5	–	5	–	0
Pittsburgh College		–		3	–	3	–	1
Rutgers		–		4	–	4	–	0
Vermont		–		4	–	4	–	1
Lehigh		–		5	–	6	–	0
Franklin & Marshall		–		4	–	5	–	0
Temple		–		3	–	4	–	1
Penn State		–		4	–	6	–	1
Dartmouth		–		2	–	4	–	2
NYU		–		3	–	6	–	1
Tufts		–		3	–	6	–	1
Wesleyan		–		3	–	6	–	1
New Hampshire		–		1	–	5	–	1
Colgate		–		2	–	8	–	0
CCNY		–		0	–	1	–	0

The 1900 Dickinson Red and White football team represented Dickinson College as an independent during the 1900 college football season. The team compiled a 5–5 record and outscored opponents by a total of 119 to 83. Sam Boyle was the head coach.

=== Schedule ===
Date	Opponent	Site	Result	Attendance	Source
September 26	vs. Carlisle	Carlisle, PA	L 0–21		
October 6	at Swarthmore	Swarthmore, PA	W 12–0		
October 10	at Penn	Franklin Field; Philadelphia, PA	L 0–35		
October 20	Penn State	Carlisle, PA	W 18–0		
October 27	Haverford	Carlisle, PA	W 27–0		
November 3	Gettysburg	Carlisle, PA	W 49–0		
November 10	at Syracuse	Syracuse, NY	L 0–6		
November 14	Lehigh	Carlisle, PA	L 0–6		
November 21	at Franklin & Marshall	Lancaster, PA	W 7–5		
November 29	at Lafayette	Easton, PA	L 6–10		

== 1901 ==
1901 Dickinson Red and White football
- Conference: Independent
- Record: 4–6
- Head coach: Ralph Hutchinson (1st season)

1901 Eastern college football independents records
	Conf.			Overall
Team	W	L	T	W		L		T
Harvard		–		12	–	0	–	0
Yale		–		11	–	1	–	1
Cornell		–		11	–	1	–	0
Dartmouth		–		10	–	1	–	0
Massachusetts		–		9	–	1	–	0
Princeton		–		9	–	1	–	1
Syracuse		–		7	–	1	–	0
Geneva		–		7	–	1	–	1
Holy Cross		–		7	–	1	–	1
Army		–		5	–	1	–	2
Western U. of Penn		–		7	–	2	–	1
Lafayette		–		9	–	3	–	0
Swarthmore		–		8	–	2	–	2
Washington & Jefferson		–		6	–	2	–	2
Franklin & Marshall		–		7	–	3	–	1
Penn		–		10	–	5	–	0
Buffalo		–		4	–	2	–	0
Columbia		–		8	–	5	–	0
Fordham		–		2	–	1	–	1
Penn State		–		5	–	3	–	0
Bucknell		–		6	–	4	–	0
Temple		–		3	–	2	–	0
NYU		–		4	–	3	–	1
Pittsburgh College		–		3	–	3	–	0
Tufts		–		6	–	6	–	1
Vermont		–		5	–	5	–	1
Carlisle		–		5	–	7	–	1
Dickinson		–		4	–	6	–	0
Brown		–		4	–	7	–	1
Villanova		–		2	–	3	–	0
Drexel		–		2	–	5	–	1
Colgate		–		2	–	5	–	0
Boston College		–		1	–	8	–	0
Lehigh		–		1	–	11	–	0
New Hampshire		–		0	–	6	–	0
Rutgers		–		0	–	7	–	0

The 1901 Dickinson Red and White football team represented Dickinson College as an independent during the 1901 college football season. The team compiled a 4–6 record and was outscored by a total of 109 to 79. Ralph Hutchinson was the head coach.

=== Schedule ===
Date	Time	Opponent	Site	Result	Attendance	Source
September 28		Susquehanna	Carlisle, PA	W 12–0		
October 5	3:00 p.m.	Carlisle	Dickinson's gridiron; Carlisle, PA	L 11–16	2,000	
October 12		Medico-Chirugical	Carlisle, PA	W 6–0		
October 16		at Princeton	University Field; Princeton, NJ	L 0–23		
October 26		at Haverford	Haverford, PA	W 10–0		
November 2		at Navy	Worden Field; Annapolis, MD	L 6–12		
November 9		Swarthmore	Carlisle, PA	W 28–6		
November 16		Medico-Chirurgical	Carlisle, PA	L 6–11		
November 23		at Penn State	Beaver Field; State College, PA	L 0–12	1,500	
November 28		at Lafayette	March Field; Easton, PA	L 0–29	3,000	

== 1902 ==
1902 Dickinson Red and White football
- Conference: Independent
- Record: 4–6
- Head coach: Charles P. Hutchins (1st season)

1902 Eastern college football independents records
	Conf.			Overall
Team	W	L	T	W		L		T
Ursinus		–		9	–	0	–	0
Yale		–		11	–	0	–	1
Geneva		–		7	–	0	–	0
Harvard		–		11	–	1	–	0
Princeton		–		8	–	1	–	0
Army		–		6	–	1	–	1
Franklin & Marshall		–		7	–	2	–	0
Dartmouth		–		6	–	2	–	1
Holy Cross		–		6	–	2	–	1
Syracuse		–		6	–	2	–	1
Carlisle		–		8	–	3	–	0
Cornell		–		8	–	3	–	0
Lafayette		–		8	–	3	–	0
Amherst		–		7	–	3	–	0
Penn State		–		7	–	3	–	0
Penn		–		9	–	4	–	0
Lehigh		–		7	–	3	–	1
Vermont		–		5	–	3	–	2
Colgate		–		5	–	3	–	1
NYU		–		5	–	3	–	0
Bucknell		–		6	–	4	–	0
Washington & Jefferson		–		6	–	4	–	0
Columbia		–		6	–	4	–	1
Springfield Training School		–		3	–	2	–	1
Villanova		–		4	–	3	–	0
Brown		–		5	–	4	–	1
Swarthmore		–		6	–	6	–	0
Western U. of Penn.		–		5	–	6	–	1
New Hampshire		–		2	–	3	–	1
Buffalo		–		3	–	5	–	1
Tufts		–		4	–	6	–	1
Dickinson		–		4	–	6	–	0
Fordham		–		2	–	4	–	1
Wesleyan		–		3	–	6	–	1
Rutgers		–		3	–	7	–	0
Navy		–		2	–	7	–	1
Drexel		–		1	–	4	–	1
Temple		–		1	–	4	–	1
Pittsburgh College		–		1	–	6	–	0
Boston College		–		0	–	8	–	0

The 1902 Dickinson Red and White football team represented Dickinson College as an independent during the 1902 college football season. The team compiled a 4–6 record and was outscored by a total of 114 to 73. Charles P. Hutchins was the head coach.

=== Schedule ===
Date	Opponent	Site	Result	Source
September 27	Lebanon Valley	Carlisle, PA	W 17–0	
October 1	Ursinus	Carlisle, PA	L 5–6	
October 11	at Army	The Plain; West Point, NY	L 0–11	
October 22	at Princeton	University Field; Princeton, NJ	L 0–23	
October 25	at Navy	Worden Field; Annapolis, MD	W 6–0	
November 1	at Steelton YMCA	Steelton, PA	L 0–28	
November 8	Haverford	Carlisle, PA	W 34–0	
November 15	at Lehigh	Bethlehem, PA	W 11–0	
November 22	Penn State	Carlisle, PA	L 0–23	
November 27	at Lafayette	March Field; Easton, PA	L 0–23	

== 1903 ==
1903 Dickinson Red and White football
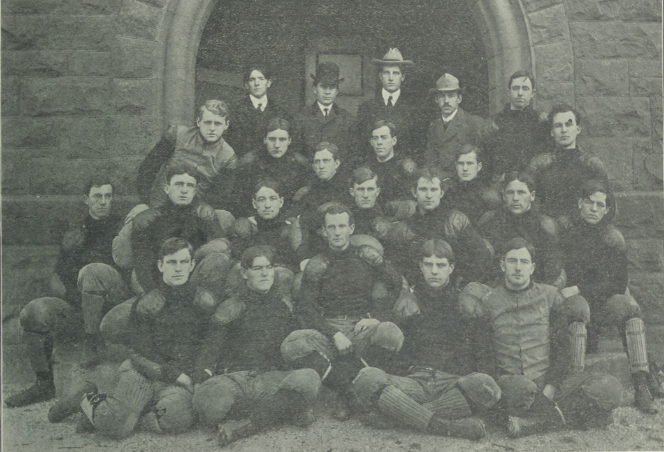
- Conference: Independent
- Record: 7–5
- Head coach: Charles P. Hutchins (2nd season)

1903 Eastern college football independents records
	Conf.			Overall
Team	W	L	T	W		L		T
Princeton		–		11	–	0	–	0
Yale		–		11	–	1	–	0
Columbia		–		9	–	1	–	0
Dartmouth		–		9	–	1	–	0
Geneva		–		9	–	1	–	0
Holy Cross		–		8	–	2	–	0
Temple		–		4	–	1	–	0
Washington & Jefferson		–		8	–	2	–	0
Lehigh		–		9	–	2	–	1
Harvard		–		9	–	3	–	0
Penn		–		9	–	3	–	0
Army		–		6	–	2	–	1
Carlisle		–		6	–	2	–	1
Amherst		–		7	–	3	–	0
Lafayette		–		7	–	3	–	0
Cornell		–		6	–	3	–	1
Colgate		–		4	–	2	–	1
Penn State		–		5	–	3	–	0
Swarthmore		–		6	–	4	–	0
Dickinson		–		7	–	5	–	0
Brown		–		5	–	4	–	1
Syracuse		–		5	–	4	–	0
Fordham		–		1	–	1	–	0
Franklin & Marshall		–		5	–	5	–	1
Buffalo		–		4	–	4	–	0
Rutgers		–		4	–	4	–	1
Delaware		–		4	–	4	–	0
Villanova		–		2	–	2	–	0
Bucknell		–		4	–	5	–	0
Vermont		–		4	–	5	–	0
Tufts		–		5	–	8	–	0
Wesleyan		–		3	–	6	–	1
Springfield Training School		–		1	–	3	–	1
NYU		–		2	–	5	–	0
New Hampshire		–		2	–	6	–	1
Pittsburgh College		–		1	–	5	–	1
Western U. Penn.		–		1	–	8	–	1

The 1903 Dickinson Red and White football team represented Dickinson College as an independent during the 1903 college football season. The team compiled a 7–5 record and outscored opponents by a total of 156 to 78. Charles P. Hutchins was the head coach.

=== Schedule ===
Date	Opponent	Site	Result	Attendance	Source
September 19	Albright	Carlisle, PA	W 45–0		
September 26	at Penn	Franklin Field; Philadelphia, PA	L 0–27		
October 3	at Steelton Y.M.C.A.	Steelton, PA	L 0–6	1,500	
October 7	Mercersburg Academy	Carlisle, PA	W 23–5		
October 10	at Army	The Plain; West Point, NY	L 0–12		
October 17	at Navy	Worden Field; Annapolis, MD	L 0–5		
October 24	Franklin & Marshall	Carlisle, PA	W 18–6		
October 31	Lehigh	Carlisle, PA	L 0–17		
November 7	at Baltimore Medical	Oriole Park; Baltimore, MD	W 12–0		
November 14	vs. Penn State	Williamsport, PA	W 6–0		
November 21	at Ursinus	Collegeville, PA	W 17–0		
November 26	at Lafayette	March Field; Easton, PA	W 35–0		

== 1904 ==
1904 Dickinson Red and White football
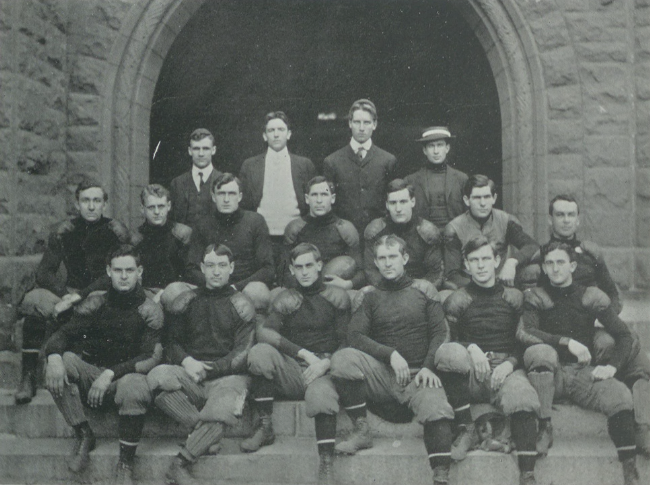
- Conference: Independent
- Record: 8–3–1
- Head coach: Forrest Craver (1st season)

1904 Eastern college football independents records
	Conf.			Overall
Team	W	L	T	W		L		T
Penn		–		12	–	0	–	0
Western U. of Penn.		–		10	–	0	–	0
Dartmouth		–		7	–	0	–	1
Yale		–		10	–	1	–	0
Amherst		–		9	–	1	–	0
Colgate		–		8	–	1	–	1
Carlisle		–		10	–	2	–	0
Lafayette		–		8	–	2	–	0
Princeton		–		8	–	2	–	0
Army		–		7	–	2	–	0
Fordham		–		4	–	1	–	1
Harvard		–		7	–	2	–	1
Dickinson		–		8	–	3	–	1
Columbia		–		7	–	3	–	0
Cornell		–		7	–	3	–	0
Villanova		–		4	–	2	–	1
Syracuse		–		6	–	3	–	0
Swarthmore		–		6	–	3	–	0
Washington & Jefferson		–		5	–	3	–	1
Penn State		–		6	–	4	–	0
Temple		–		3	–	2	–	0
Brown		–		6	–	5	–	0
Bucknell		–		3	–	3	–	0
Springfield Training School		–		4	–	4	–	1
NYU		–		3	–	6	–	0
Holy Cross		–		2	–	5	–	2
Wesleyan		–		3	–	7	–	0
Geneva		–		1	–	4	–	2
Vermont		–		1	–	5	–	2
New Hampshire		–		2	–	5	–	0
Rutgers		–		1	–	6	–	2
Tufts		–		2	–	9	–	1
Lehigh		–		1	–	8	–	0
Franklin & Marshall		–		0	–	10	–	0

The 1904 Dickinson Red and White football team represented Dickinson College as an independent during the 1904 college football season. The team compiled an 8–3–1 record and outscored opponents by a total of 219 to 53. Professor Forrest Craver was chosen as the team's head football coach; he had been the captain of Dickinson's 1897 team.

=== Schedule ===
Date	Opponent	Site	Result	Source
September 24	Western Maryland	Carlisle, PA	W 10–0	
September 28	at Princeton	University Field; Princeton, NJ	L 0–12	
October 1	Albright	Carlisle, PA	W 58–0	
October 5	Mercersburg Academy	Carlisle, PA	W 18–0	
October 8	at Army	The Plain; West Point, NY	L 0–18	
October 15	at Franklin & Marshall	Lancaster, PA	W 57–0	
October 22	at Navy	Worden Field; Annapolis, MD	T 0–0	
October 29	at Lehigh	Bethlehem, PA	W 6–0	
November 5	Lebanon Valley	Carlisle, PA	W 44–0	
November 12	vs. Penn State	Williamsport, PA	L 0–11	
November 19	Ursinus	Carlisle, PA	W 16–6	
November 24	at Washington & Jefferson	College Park; Washington, PA	W 10–6	

== 1905 ==
1905 Dickinson Red and White football
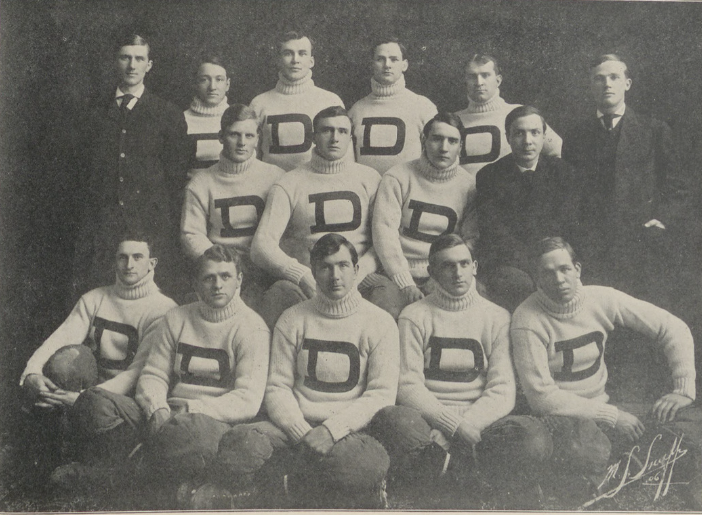
- Conference: Independent
- Record: 4–4
- Head coach: J. William Williams (1st season)

1905 Eastern college football independents records
	Conf.			Overall
Team	W	L	T	W		L		T
Yale		–		10	–	0	–	0
Penn		–		12	–	0	–	1
Temple		–		2	–	0	–	1
Dartmouth		–		7	–	1	–	2
Swarthmore		–		7	–	1	–	0
Western U. of Penn.		–		10	–	2	–	0
Princeton		–		8	–	2	–	0
Harvard		–		8	–	2	–	1
Washington & Jefferson		–		10	–	3	–	0
Lafayette		–		7	–	2	–	1
Wesleyan		–		7	–	2	–	1
Carlisle		–		10	–	4	–	0
Penn State		–		8	–	3	–	0
Syracuse		–		8	–	3	–	0
Fordham		–		5	–	2	–	0
Amherst		–		3	–	1	–	2
Holy Cross		–		6	–	3	–	0
Brown		–		7	–	4	–	0
Tufts		–		5	–	3	–	0
Vermont		–		6	–	4	–	1
Cornell		–		6	–	4	–	0
Colgate		–		5	–	4	–	0
Columbia		–		4	–	3	–	2
Army		–		4	–	4	–	1
Bucknell		–		5	–	5	–	0
Dickinson		–		4	–	4	–	0
NYU		–		3	–	3	–	1
Lehigh		–		6	–	7	–	0
Franklin & Marshall		–		4	–	6	–	0
Geneva		–		4	–	6	–	0
New Hampshire		–		2	–	4	–	2
Springfield Training School		–		3	–	5	–	0
Rutgers		–		3	–	6	–	0
Villanova		–		3	–	7	–	0
Drexel		–		1	–	7	–	0

The 1905 Dickinson Red and White football team represented Dickinson College as an independent during the 1905 college football season. The team compiled a 4–4 record and outscored opponents by a total of 122 to 72. J. William Williams was the head coach.

=== Schedule ===
Date	Opponent	Site	Result	Attendance	Source
September 30	Western Maryland	Carlisle, PA	W 26–0		
October 7	Haverford	Carlisle, PA	W 44–0		
October 14	at Navy	Worden Field; Annapolis, MD	L 0–6		
October 21	vs. Carlisle	Carlisle, PA	L 0–36		
October 28	at Western University of Pennsylvania	Exposition Park; Pittsburgh, PA	L 10–24	4,000	
November 4	at Ursinus	Collegeville, PA	W 24–0		
November 11	Lehigh	Carlisle, PA	W 18–0		
November 18	vs. Penn State	Williamsport, PA	L 0–6	8,000	

== 1906 ==
1906 Dickinson Red and White football
- Conference: Independent
- Record: 3–4–2
- Head coach: J. William Williams (2nd season)

1906 Eastern college football independents records
	Conf.			Overall
Team	W	L	T	W		L		T
Princeton		–		9	–	0	–	1
Yale		–		9	–	0	–	1
Haverford		–		7	–	0	–	2
Harvard		–		10	–	1	–	0
Cornell		–		8	–	1	–	2
Lafayette		–		8	–	1	–	1
Penn State		–		8	–	1	–	1
Washington & Jefferson		–		9	–	2	–	0
Swarthmore		–		7	–	2	–	0
Drexel		–		6	–	2	–	0
Tufts		–		6	–	2	–	0
Penn		–		7	–	2	–	3
Carlisle		–		9	–	3	–	0
Brown		–		6	–	3	–	0
Rutgers		–		5	–	2	–	2
Dartmouth		–		6	–	3	–	1
Syracuse		–		6	–	3	–	0
Colgate		–		4	–	2	–	2
Vermont		–		5	–	4	–	0
Fordham		–		5	–	3	–	0
Western U. of Penn.		–		6	–	4	–	0
Holy Cross		–		4	–	3	–	1
Amherst		–		3	–	3	–	1
Lehigh		–		5	–	5	–	1
Bucknell		–		3	–	4	–	1
Dickinson		–		3	–	4	–	2
Carnegie Tech		–		2	–	3	–	2
Army		–		3	–	5	–	1
Franklin & Marshall		–		3	–	5	–	1
Wesleyan		–		2	–	4	–	1
New Hampshire		–		2	–	5	–	1
Villanova		–		3	–	7	–	0
Springfield Training School		–		1	–	5	–	3
NYU		–		0	–	4	–	0

The 1906 Dickinson Red and White football team represented Dickinson College as an independent during the 1906 college football season. The team compiled a 3–4–2 record and outscored opponents by a total of 64 to 59. J. William Williams was the head coach.

=== Schedule ===
Date	Opponent	Site	Result	Source
September 29	Lebanon Valley	Carlisle, PA	W 26–0	
October 6	at Navy	Worden Field; Annapolis, MD	T 0–0	
October 13	at Steelton YMCA	Steelton, PA	L 0–15	
October 20	Ursinus	Carlisle, PA	W 4–0	
October 27	at Washington & Jefferson	Washington, PA	L 0–2	
November 3	at Lehigh	Bethlehem, PA	T 0–0	
November 17	vs. Penn State	Williamsport, PA	L 0–6	
November 24	Susquehanna	Carlisle, PA	W 28–10	
November 29	at Lafayette	March Field; Easton, PA	L 6–26	

== 1907 ==
1907 Dickinson Red and White football
- Conference: Independent
- Record: 3–4–2
- Head coach: Joseph Pipal (1st season)

1907 Eastern college football independents records
	Conf.			Overall
Team	W	L	T	W		L		T
Yale		–		9	–	0	–	1
Dartmouth		–		8	–	0	–	1
Penn		–		11	–	1	–	0
Carlisle		–		10	–	1	–	0
Temple		–		4	–	0	–	2
Fordham		–		6	–	1	–	1
Cornell		–		8	–	2	–	0
Western U. of Penn.		–		8	–	2	–	0
Princeton		–		7	–	2	–	0
Washington & Jefferson		–		7	–	2	–	0
Lafayette		–		7	–	2	–	1
Lehigh		–		7	–	2	–	1
Swarthmore		–		6	–	2	–	0
Army		–		6	–	2	–	1
NYU		–		5	–	2	–	0
Vermont		–		4	–	1	–	2
Harvard		–		7	–	3	–	0
Brown		–		7	–	3	–	0
Penn State		–		6	–	4	–	0
Syracuse		–		5	–	3	–	1
Drexel		–		3	–	2	–	2
Colgate		–		4	–	4	–	1
Geneva		–		4	–	5	–	2
Dickinson		–		3	–	4	–	2
Amherst		–		3	–	4	–	1
Tufts		–		3	–	4	–	1
Franklin & Marshall		–		4	–	6	–	0
Rutgers		–		3	–	5	–	1
Springfield Training School		–		2	–	4	–	2
Bucknell		–		4	–	7	–	0
New Hampshire		–		1	–	5	–	2
Villanova		–		1	–	5	–	1
Holy Cross		–		1	–	7	–	2
Wesleyan		–		1	–	7	–	1
Carnegie Tech		–		1	–	8	–	0

The 1907 Dickinson Red and White football team represented Dickinson College as an independent during the 1907 college football season. The team compiled a 3–4–2 record and was outscored by a total of 202 to 34. Joseph Pipal was the head coach.

=== Schedule ===
Date	Time	Opponent	Site	Result	Source
September 28		Western Maryland	Carlisle, PA	W 6–0	
October 5		at Navy	Worden Field; Annapolis, MD	L 0–15	
October 12	3:12 p.m.	at Washington & Jefferson	Washington, PA	L 0–34	
October 19		at Ursinus	Collegeville, PA	L 0–16	
October 26		Lehigh	Carlisle, PA	T 6–6	
November 2		vs. Penn State	Williamsport, PA	L 0–52	
November 9		Medico-Chirurgical	Carlisle, PA	W 4–0	
November 16		at Bucknell	Lewisburg, PA	L 0–48	
November 23		Mount St. Mary's	Carlisle, PA	W 18–0	
November 28		at Lafayette	March Field; Easton, PA	L 0–31	

== 1908 ==
1908 Dickinson Red and White football
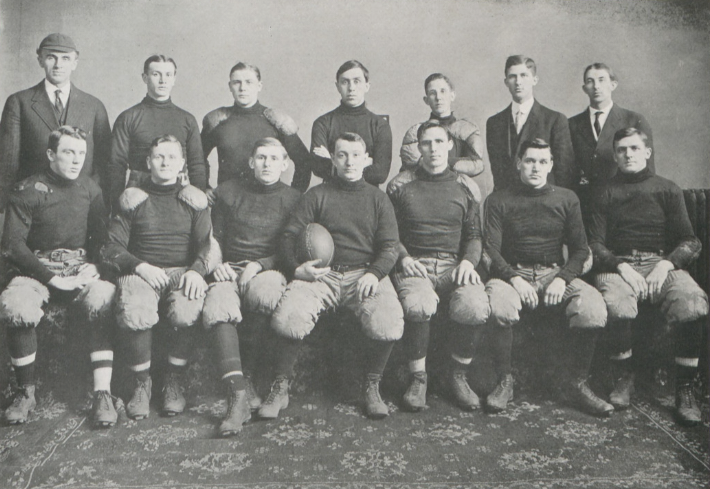
- Conference: Independent
- Record: 5–4
- Head coach: Paul J. Davis (1st season)

1908 Eastern college football independents records
	Conf.			Overall
Team	W	L	T	W		L		T
Penn		–		11	–	0	–	1
Harvard		–		9	–	0	–	1
Cornell		–		7	–	1	–	1
Fordham		–		5	–	1	–	0
Yale		–		7	–	1	–	1
Dartmouth		–		6	–	1	–	1
Carlisle		–		10	–	2	–	1
Washington & Jefferson		–		10	–	2	–	1
Army		–		6	–	1	–	2
Pittsburgh		–		8	–	3	–	0
Lafayette		–		6	–	2	–	2
Princeton		–		5	–	2	–	3
Syracuse		–		6	–	3	–	1
Brown		–		5	–	3	–	1
Temple		–		3	–	2	–	1
Colgate		–		4	–	3	–	0
Lehigh		–		4	–	3	–	0
Dickinson		–		5	–	4	–	0
Amherst		–		3	–	3	–	2
Holy Cross		–		4	–	4	–	0
Penn State		–		5	–	5	–	0
Vermont		–		3	–	3	–	3
Wesleyan		–		3	–	4	–	2
Springfield Training School		–		3	–	4	–	1
NYU		–		2	–	3	–	2
Franklin & Marshall		–		4	–	6	–	1
Bucknell		–		3	–	5	–	2
Rutgers		–		3	–	5	–	1
Boston College		–		2	–	4	–	2
Carnegie Tech		–		3	–	7	–	0
Geneva		–		1	–	6	–	2
Tufts		–		1	–	6	–	1
Villanova		–		1	–	6	–	0
New Hampshire		–		1	–	7	–	0
Drexel		–		0	–	7	–	0

The 1908 Dickinson Red and White football team represented Dickinson College as an independent during the 1908 college football season. The team compiled a 5–4 record and was outscored by a total of 77 to 69. Paul J. Davis was the head coach.

=== Schedule ===
Date	Opponent	Site	Result	Source
September 24	Western Maryland	Carlisle, PA	W 5–0	
October 3	at Franklin & Marshall	Lancaster, PA	W 16–0	
October 10	at Navy	Worden Field; Annapolis, MD	L 0–22	
October 17	Ursinus	Carlisle, PA	W 8–4	
October 31	at Gettysburg	Gettysburg, PA	L 5–23	
November 7	at Washington & Jefferson	College Park; Washington, PA	L 0–16	
November 14	Bucknell	Carlisle, PA	W 6–0	
November 21	Mount St. Mary's	Carlisle, PA	W 29–0	
November 26	at Lafayette	Easton, PA	L 0–12	

== 1909 ==
1909 Dickinson Red and White football
- Conference: Independent
- Record: 4–4–1
- Head coach: Paul G. Smith (1st season)

1909 Eastern college football independents records
	Conf.			Overall
Team	W	L	T	W		L		T
Yale		–		10	–	0	–	0
Lafayette		–		7	–	0	–	1
Franklin & Marshall		–		9	–	1	–	0
Harvard		–		9	–	1	–	0
Penn State		–		5	–	0	–	2
Washington & Jefferson		–		8	–	1	–	1
Springfield Training School		–		5	–	1	–	0
NYU		–		6	–	1	–	1
Ursinus		–		6	–	1	–	1
Penn		–		7	–	1	–	2
Trinity (CT)		–		6	–	1	–	2
Dartmouth		–		5	–	1	–	2
Fordham		–		5	–	1	–	2
Princeton		–		6	–	2	–	1
Pittsburgh		–		6	–	2	–	1
Carlisle		–		8	–	3	–	1
Colgate		–		5	–	2	–	1
Brown		–		7	–	3	–	1
Geneva		–		4	–	2	–	0
Carnegie Tech		–		5	–	3	–	1
Vermont		–		4	–	2	–	2
Lehigh		–		4	–	3	–	2
Army		–		3	–	2	–	0
Villanova		–		3	–	2	–	0
Dickinson		–		4	–	4	–	1
Syracuse		–		4	–	5	–	1
Bucknell		–		3	–	4	–	2
Boston College		–		3	–	4	–	1
Cornell		–		3	–	4	–	1
New Hampshire		–		3	–	4	–	0
Rhode Island State		–		3	–	4	–	0
Rutgers		–		3	–	5	–	1
Wesleyan		–		3	–	5	–	1
Holy Cross		–		2	–	4	–	2
Swarthmore		–		2	–	5	–	0
Drexel		–		1	–	5	–	3
Tufts		–		2	–	6	–	0
Amherst		–		1	–	6	–	1
Temple		–		0	–	4	–	1

The 1909 Dickinson Red and White football team represented Dickinson College as an independent during the 1909 college football season. The team compiled a 4–4–1 record and was outscored by a total of 85 to 77. Paul G. Smith was the head coach.

=== Schedule ===
Date	Opponent	Site	Result	Source
September 25	Western Maryland	Biddle Field; Carlisle, PA	W 5–0	
October 2	at Penn	Franklin Field; Philadelphia	L 0–18	
October 16	at Washington & Jefferson	College Park; Washington, PA	L 3–18	
October 23	at Ursinus	Ursinus Field; Collegeville, PA	L 6–24	
October 30	Gettysburg	Biddle Field; Carlisle, PA	W 14–0	
November 6	at Johns Hopkins	Baltimore, MD	W 12–6	
November 13	at Bucknell	Lewisburg, PA	T 6–6	
November 20	Mount Carmel All-Stars	Biddle Field; Carlisle, PA	W 39–0	
November 25	at Lafayette	March Field; Easton, PA	L 0–5	
