= W. J. Randall =

American football player and coach (1874–1925)

Biographical details
- Born: June 27, 1874; Boston, Massachusetts, U.S.
- Died: November 17, 1925 (aged 51); Chelsea, Massachusetts, U.S.

Playing career
- 1892: Dartmouth
- 1894–1895: Dartmouth
- Positions: Tackle, back

Coaching career (HC unless noted)
- 1896: Illinois (assistant)
- 1896–1897: Norwich
- 1909: Dartmouth (backfield)
- 1910: Dartmouth
- 1911–1914: Dartmouth (assistant)

Head coaching record
- Overall: 5–2

William Joseph Randall (June 27, 1874 – November 17, 1925) was an American college football player and coach. He served as head coach at Dartmouth in 1910 and amassed a 5–2 record.

Randall was born in Boston, Massachusetts, on June 27, 1874. A native of Chelsea, Massachusetts, Randall attended Dartmouth College from which he graduated in 1896. he played on the football team and earned varsity letters in 1892, 1894, and 1895. Randall was a member of Phi Beta Kappa society.

In 1896, he served as a coach at the University of Illinois under fellow Dartmouth alumnus George Huff. In 1909, Randall served as Dartmouth's assistant coach responsible for the backfield on the Dartmouth staff under W. H. Lillard.

In 1910, Randall took over as head coach, with coaching duties also shared with Tom Keady and Clark Tobin, which was a continuation of earlier practice of the football program. Randall continued to serve on the Dartmouth coaching staff over the next several years, including as a scout, until at least 1914.

Randall died in his home in Chelsea on November 17, 1925, at the age of 51.

== Head coaching record ==
Year	Team	Overall	Conference	Standing	Bowl/playoffs
Dartmouth (Independent) (1910)
1910	Dartmouth	5–2			
Dartmouth:		5–2			
Total:		5–2			
