= Forrest Craver =

Biographical details
- Born: September 24, 1875; Wapwallopen, Pennsylvania, U.S.
- Died: October 18, 1958 (aged 83); Carlisle, Pennsylvania, U.S.

Playing career
- 1895–1898: Dickinson
- Position: End

Coaching career (HC unless noted)
- 1904: Dickinson
- 1918–1921: Dickinson

Head coaching record
- Overall: 21–18–6

Forrest Eugene "Cap" Craver Sr. (September 24, 1875 – October 18, 1958) was an American college football player and coach and athletic director who helped to pioneer physical education programs at the collegiate level including the introduction of intramural sports.

== Coaching career ==
=== Football ===
Craver served as the fifth and fourteenth head football coach at Dickinson College in Carlisle, Pennsylvania. He held that position for a total of five seasons, first coaching the team for the 1904 season and then returning to coach the team from 1918 until 1921. His overall coaching record at Dickinson was 21 wins, 18 losses, and 6 ties. This ranks him seventh at Dickinson in terms of total wins and tenth at Dickinson in terms of winning percentage.

Craver was the first graduate of Dickinson to coach football at Dickinson. His teams would often scrimmage against the cross-town rivals Carlisle Indians coached by Pop Warner.

Craver was also a delegate to the 1909 Intercollegiate Athletic Association meeting. This meeting brought about serious reforms for safety and rules changes in the sport of American football.

For the 1917 season, he worked as head coach and director of sports at the Tome School in Maryland.

=== Track and field ===
Besides coaching football, Craver coached track as well. He led the Dickinson track team to ten undefeated seasons in 1912, 1915, 1916, 1917, 1920, 1922, 1923, 1926, 1929, and 1934. Craver was the organizer and early president of the Old Middle Atlantic Collegiate Track and Field Association

=== Athletic director ===
While serving as athletic director in 1904–05, Craver was sued by Ralph O. Hall, a Dickinson College junior, and varsity baseball pitcher, for breach of contract for offering Hall money to attend Dickinson and play baseball, rather than attending Cornell. The court awarded judgment of $217 to Hall. Craver resigned his position with the college, and left for several years, before returning for a long and successful coaching career.

== Academics ==
Craver was a long-standing faculty member at Dickinson as instructor of mathematics, Latin, and physical education. The school has honored his memory by annually awarding "The Forrest E. Craver Mathematics Prize" to selected graduates. He was a long-standing member of the Phi Beta Kappa organization at Dickinson and was the local chapter's treasurer from 1910 until 1939.
