= 1909 Vermont Green and Gold football team =

American college football season

1909 Vermont Green and Gold football
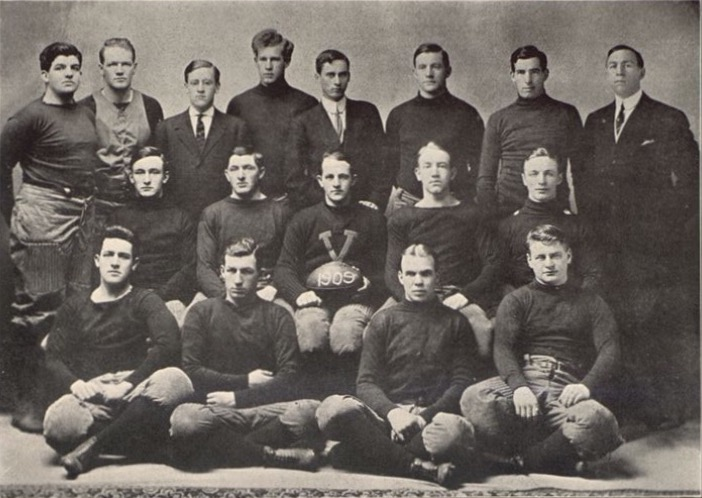
- Conference: Independent
- Record: 4–2–2
- Head coach: Ray B. Thomas (1st season)
- Home stadium: Centennial Field

1909 Eastern college football independents records
	Conf.			Overall
Team	W	L	T	W		L		T
Yale		–		10	–	0	–	0
Lafayette		–		7	–	0	–	1
Franklin & Marshall		–		9	–	1	–	0
Harvard		–		9	–	1	–	0
Penn State		–		5	–	0	–	2
Washington & Jefferson		–		8	–	1	–	1
Springfield Training School		–		5	–	1	–	0
NYU		–		6	–	1	–	1
Ursinus		–		6	–	1	–	1
Penn		–		7	–	1	–	2
Trinity (CT)		–		6	–	1	–	2
Dartmouth		–		5	–	1	–	2
Fordham		–		5	–	1	–	2
Princeton		–		6	–	2	–	1
Pittsburgh		–		6	–	2	–	1
Carlisle		–		8	–	3	–	1
Colgate		–		5	–	2	–	1
Brown		–		7	–	3	–	1
Geneva		–		4	–	2	–	0
Carnegie Tech		–		5	–	3	–	1
Vermont		–		4	–	2	–	2
Lehigh		–		4	–	3	–	2
Army		–		3	–	2	–	0
Villanova		–		3	–	2	–	0
Dickinson		–		4	–	4	–	1
Syracuse		–		4	–	5	–	1
Bucknell		–		3	–	4	–	2
Boston College		–		3	–	4	–	1
Cornell		–		3	–	4	–	1
New Hampshire		–		3	–	4	–	0
Rhode Island State		–		3	–	4	–	0
Rutgers		–		3	–	5	–	1
Wesleyan		–		3	–	5	–	1
Holy Cross		–		2	–	4	–	2
Swarthmore		–		2	–	5	–	0
Drexel		–		1	–	5	–	3
Tufts		–		2	–	6	–	0
Amherst		–		1	–	6	–	1
Temple		–		0	–	4	–	1

The 1909 Vermont Green and Gold football team was an American football team that represented the University of Vermont as an independent during the 1909 college football season. In their only year under head coach Ray B. Thomas, the team compiled a 4–2–2 record.

== Schedule ==
Date	Opponent	Site	Result	Source
October 2	at Dartmouth	Alumni Oval; Hanover, NH	T 0–0	
October 9	St. Lawrence	Centennial Field; Burlington, VT	W 16–0	
October 16	at Wesleyan	Andrus Field; Middletown, CT	T 5–5	
October 23	at Cornell	Percy Field; Ithaca, NY	L 0–16	
October 27	Norwich	Centennial Field; Burlington, VT	W 11–0	
October 30	New Hampshire	Centennial Field; Burlington, VT	W 11–0	
November 6	at Amherst	Pratt Field; Amherst, MA	W 5–0	
November 13	at Brown	Andrews Field; Providence, RI	L 0–17	
