= 1909 Dartmouth football team =

American college football season

1909 Dartmouth football
- Conference: Independent
- Record: 5–1–2
- Head coach: W. H. Lillard (1st season)
- Captain: Clark Tobin

1909 Eastern college football independents records
	Conf.			Overall
Team	W	L	T	W		L		T
Yale		–		10	–	0	–	0
Lafayette		–		7	–	0	–	1
Franklin & Marshall		–		9	–	1	–	0
Harvard		–		9	–	1	–	0
Penn State		–		5	–	0	–	2
Washington & Jefferson		–		8	–	1	–	1
Springfield Training School		–		5	–	1	–	0
NYU		–		6	–	1	–	1
Ursinus		–		6	–	1	–	1
Penn		–		7	–	1	–	2
Trinity (CT)		–		6	–	1	–	2
Dartmouth		–		5	–	1	–	2
Fordham		–		5	–	1	–	2
Princeton		–		6	–	2	–	1
Pittsburgh		–		6	–	2	–	1
Carlisle		–		8	–	3	–	1
Colgate		–		5	–	2	–	1
Brown		–		7	–	3	–	1
Geneva		–		4	–	2	–	0
Carnegie Tech		–		5	–	3	–	1
Vermont		–		4	–	2	–	2
Lehigh		–		4	–	3	–	2
Army		–		3	–	2	–	0
Villanova		–		3	–	2	–	0
Dickinson		–		4	–	4	–	1
Syracuse		–		4	–	5	–	1
Bucknell		–		3	–	4	–	2
Boston College		–		3	–	4	–	1
Cornell		–		3	–	4	–	1
New Hampshire		–		3	–	4	–	0
Rhode Island State		–		3	–	4	–	0
Rutgers		–		3	–	5	–	1
Wesleyan		–		3	–	5	–	1
Holy Cross		–		2	–	4	–	2
Swarthmore		–		2	–	5	–	0
Drexel		–		1	–	5	–	3
Tufts		–		2	–	6	–	0
Amherst		–		1	–	6	–	1
Temple		–		0	–	4	–	1

The 1909 Dartmouth football team was an American football team that represented Dartmouth College as an independent during the 1909 college football season. In its first and only season under head coach W. H. Lillard, the team compiled a 5–1–2 record, shut out six of eight opponents, and outscored all opponents by a total of 89 to 18. Clark Tobin was the team captain.

== Schedule ==
Date	Opponent	Site	Result	Source
September 29	Massachusetts	Alumni Oval; Hanover, NH	W 23–0	
October 2	Vermont	Alumni Oval; Hanover, NH	T 0–0	
October 9	Bowdoin	Alumni Oval; Hanover, NH	W 15–0	
October 16	Williams	Alumni Oval; Hanover, NH	W 18–0	
October 23	at Amherst	Amherst, MA	W 12–0	
October 30	Holy Cross	Alumni Oval; Hanover, NH	W 12–0	
November 6	at Princeton	Osborne Field; Princeton, NJ	T 6–6	
November 13	at Harvard	Harvard Stadium; Boston, MA (rivalry)	L 3–12	
