= 1905 Vermont Green and Gold football team =

American college football season

1905 Vermont Green and Gold football
- Conference: Independent
- Record: 6–4–1
- Head coach: George B. Drake (1st season)
- Home stadium: Centennial Field

1905 Eastern college football independents records
	Conf.			Overall
Team	W	L	T	W		L		T
Yale		–		10	–	0	–	0
Penn		–		12	–	0	–	1
Temple		–		2	–	0	–	1
Dartmouth		–		7	–	1	–	2
Swarthmore		–		7	–	1	–	0
Western U. of Penn.		–		10	–	2	–	0
Princeton		–		8	–	2	–	0
Harvard		–		8	–	2	–	1
Washington & Jefferson		–		10	–	3	–	0
Lafayette		–		7	–	2	–	1
Wesleyan		–		7	–	2	–	1
Carlisle		–		10	–	4	–	0
Penn State		–		8	–	3	–	0
Syracuse		–		8	–	3	–	0
Fordham		–		5	–	2	–	0
Amherst		–		3	–	1	–	2
Holy Cross		–		6	–	3	–	0
Brown		–		7	–	4	–	0
Tufts		–		5	–	3	–	0
Vermont		–		6	–	4	–	1
Cornell		–		6	–	4	–	0
Colgate		–		5	–	4	–	0
Columbia		–		4	–	3	–	2
Army		–		4	–	4	–	1
Bucknell		–		5	–	5	–	0
Dickinson		–		4	–	4	–	0
NYU		–		3	–	3	–	1
Lehigh		–		6	–	7	–	0
Franklin & Marshall		–		4	–	6	–	0
Geneva		–		4	–	6	–	0
New Hampshire		–		2	–	4	–	2
Springfield Training School		–		3	–	5	–	0
Rutgers		–		3	–	6	–	0
Villanova		–		3	–	7	–	0
Drexel		–		1	–	7	–	0

The 1905 Vermont Green and Gold football team was an American football team that represented the University of Vermont as an independent during the 1905 college football season. In their first year under head coach George B. Drake, the team compiled a 6–4–1 record.

== Schedule ==
Date	Opponent	Site	Result	Source
September 30	Fort Ethan Allen	Centennial Field; Burlington, VT	W 17–0	
October 4	at Dartmouth	Alumni Oval; Hanover, NH	L 0–12	
October 7	Middlebury	Centennial Field; Burlington, VT	W 11–0	
October 14	at Wesleyan	Andrus Field; Middletown, CT	L 11–19	
October 21	New Hampshire	Centennial Field; Burlington, VT	T 0–0	
October 25	Norwich	Centennial Field; Burlington, VT	W 26–0	
October 28	at Amherst	Pratt Field; Amherst, MA	L 6–16	
November 7	at Middlebury	Middlebury, VT	W 10–0	
November 11	Fort Ethan Allen	Centennial Field; Burlington, VT	W 12–0	
November 15	at Norwich	Northfield, VT	W 16–0	
November 18	at Brown	Andrews Field; Providence, RI	L 0–56	
