= 1905 Penn Quakers football team =

American college football season

1905 Penn Quakers football
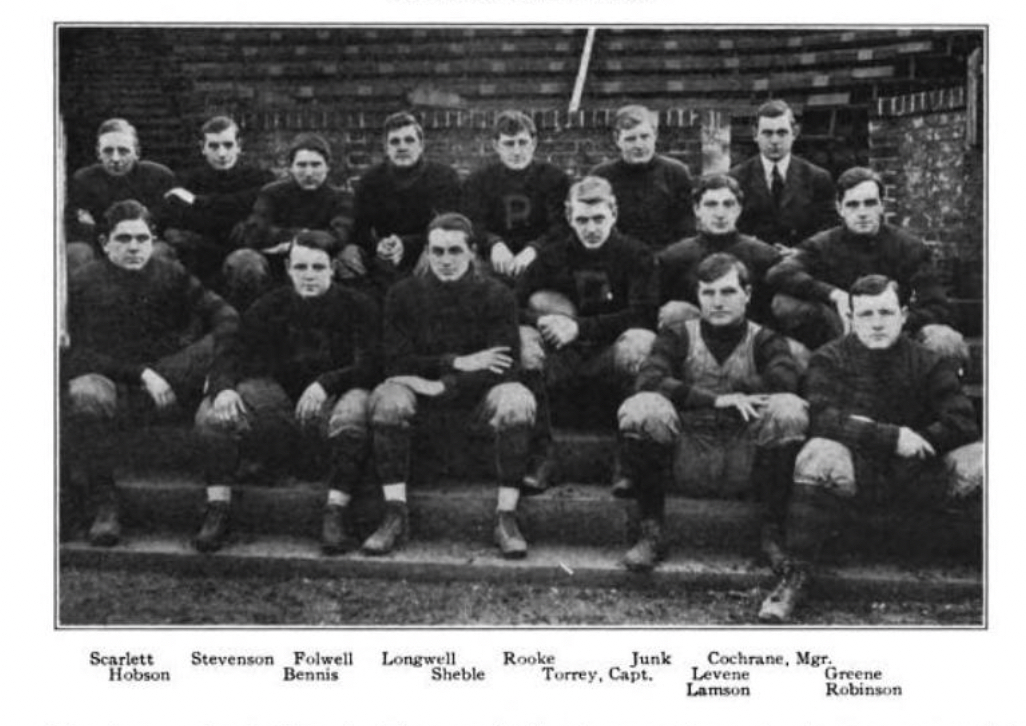
- Conference: Independent
- Record: 12–0–1
- Head coach: Carl S. Williams (4th season)
- Captain: Robert Torrey
- Home stadium: Franklin Field

1905 Eastern college football independents records
	Conf.			Overall
Team	W	L	T	W		L		T
Yale		–		10	–	0	–	0
Penn		–		12	–	0	–	1
Temple		–		2	–	0	–	1
Dartmouth		–		7	–	1	–	2
Swarthmore		–		7	–	1	–	0
Western U. of Penn.		–		10	–	2	–	0
Princeton		–		8	–	2	–	0
Harvard		–		8	–	2	–	1
Washington & Jefferson		–		10	–	3	–	0
Lafayette		–		7	–	2	–	1
Wesleyan		–		7	–	2	–	1
Carlisle		–		10	–	4	–	0
Penn State		–		8	–	3	–	0
Syracuse		–		8	–	3	–	0
Fordham		–		5	–	2	–	0
Amherst		–		3	–	1	–	2
Holy Cross		–		6	–	3	–	0
Brown		–		7	–	4	–	0
Tufts		–		5	–	3	–	0
Vermont		–		6	–	4	–	1
Cornell		–		6	–	4	–	0
Colgate		–		5	–	4	–	0
Columbia		–		4	–	3	–	2
Army		–		4	–	4	–	1
Bucknell		–		5	–	5	–	0
Dickinson		–		4	–	4	–	0
NYU		–		3	–	3	–	1
Lehigh		–		6	–	7	–	0
Franklin & Marshall		–		4	–	6	–	0
Geneva		–		4	–	6	–	0
New Hampshire		–		2	–	4	–	2
Springfield Training School		–		3	–	5	–	0
Rutgers		–		3	–	6	–	0
Villanova		–		3	–	7	–	0
Drexel		–		1	–	7	–	0

The 1905 Penn Quakers football team represented the University of Pennsylvania as an independent during the 1905 college football season. The Quakers finished with an undefeated 12–0–1 record in their fourth year under head coach Carl S. Williams. Significant games included a 6 to 0 victory over the Carlisle Indians, a 12 to 6 victory over Harvard, a 23 to 0 victory over Columbia, a 6 to 5 victory over Cornell, and a 6–6 tie with Lafayette. The 1905 Penn team outscored its opponents by a combined total of 259 to 33.

Six Penn players received recognition on the 1905 College Football All-America Team. They are: end Izzy Levene (WC-3; NYW; NYG); tackle Otis Lamson (WC-1; CW-1; NYEP; NYW; NYG; NYEP; NYT; NYG); guard F. Hobson (NYEP; NYG); center Robert Torrey (WC-1; CW-1; NYEP; NYT; NYW; NYG); quarterback Vince Stevenson (NYW); and halfback H.W. Sheble (WC-2).

== Schedule ==
Date	Opponent	Site	Result	Attendance	Source
September 30	Lehigh	Franklin Field; Philadelphia, PA	W 35–0		
October 4	Gettysburg	Franklin Field; Philadelphia, PA	W 16–6		
October 7	Swarthmore	Franklin Field; Philadelphia, PA	W 11–4		
October 11	Franklin & Marshall	Franklin Field; Philadelphia, PA	W 38–0		
October 14	North Carolina	Franklin Field; Philadelphia, PA	W 17–0		
October 18	Ursinus	Franklin Field; Philadelphia, PA	W 39–0		
October 21	Brown	Franklin Field; Philadelphia, PA	W 8–6		
October 28	Carlisle	Franklin Field; Philadelphia, PA	W 6–0	20,000	
November 4	Lafayette	Franklin Field; Philadelphia, PA	T 6–6		
November 11	Harvard	Franklin Field; Philadelphia, PA (rivalry)	W 12–6		
November 18	Villanova	Franklin Field; Philadelphia, PA	W 42–0		
November 25	at Columbia	American League Park; New York, NY	W 23–0	10,000	
November 30	Cornell	Franklin Field; Philadelphia, PA (rivalry)	W 6–5		
