= 1905 Swarthmore Quakers football team =

American college football season

1905 Swarthmore Quakers football
- Conference: Independent
- Record: 8–1
- Head coach: George H. Brooke (7th season)
- Home stadium: Whittier Field

1905 Eastern college football independents records
	Conf.			Overall
Team	W	L	T	W		L		T
Yale		–		10	–	0	–	0
Penn		–		12	–	0	–	1
Temple		–		2	–	0	–	1
Dartmouth		–		7	–	1	–	2
Swarthmore		–		7	–	1	–	0
Western U. of Penn.		–		10	–	2	–	0
Princeton		–		8	–	2	–	0
Harvard		–		8	–	2	–	1
Washington & Jefferson		–		10	–	3	–	0
Lafayette		–		7	–	2	–	1
Wesleyan		–		7	–	2	–	1
Carlisle		–		10	–	4	–	0
Penn State		–		8	–	3	–	0
Syracuse		–		8	–	3	–	0
Fordham		–		5	–	2	–	0
Amherst		–		3	–	1	–	2
Holy Cross		–		6	–	3	–	0
Brown		–		7	–	4	–	0
Tufts		–		5	–	3	–	0
Vermont		–		6	–	4	–	1
Cornell		–		6	–	4	–	0
Colgate		–		5	–	4	–	0
Columbia		–		4	–	3	–	2
Army		–		4	–	4	–	1
Bucknell		–		5	–	5	–	0
Dickinson		–		4	–	4	–	0
NYU		–		3	–	3	–	1
Lehigh		–		6	–	7	–	0
Franklin & Marshall		–		4	–	6	–	0
Geneva		–		4	–	6	–	0
New Hampshire		–		2	–	4	–	2
Springfield Training School		–		3	–	5	–	0
Rutgers		–		3	–	6	–	0
Villanova		–		3	–	7	–	0
Drexel		–		1	–	7	–	0

The 1905 Swarthmore Quakers football team was an American football team that represented Swarthmore College as an independent during the 1905 college football season. The team compiled an 8–1 record and outscored opponents by a total of 218 to 22. George H. Brooke was the head coach. The team's only loss was to undefeated Penn.

== Schedule ==
Date	Opponent	Site	Result	Attendance	Source
October 2	Pennsylvania Railroad Y.M.C.A.		W 17–0		
October 7	at Penn	Franklin Field; Philadelphia, PA	L 4–11		
October 14	George Washington	Whittier Field; Swarthmore, PA	W 30–0		
October 21	at Georgetown	Washington, DC	W 28–0		
October 26	Medico-Chi	Swarthmore, PA	W 28–0		
October 28	at Navy	Worden Field; Annapolis, MD	W 6–5		
November 4	at Cornell	Percy Field; Ithaca, NY	W 14–0	30,000	
November 15	Lafayette	Whittier Field; Swarthmore, PA	W 27–0		
November 25	Wesleyan	Whittier Field; Swarthmore, PA	W 50–6		
