= 1905 Rutgers Queensmen football team =

American college football season

1905 Rutgers Queensmen football
- Conference: Independent
- Record: 3–6
- Head coach: Oliver D. Mann (2nd season)
- Captain: Harold F. Green
- Home stadium: Neilson Field

1905 Eastern college football independents records
	Conf.			Overall
Team	W	L	T	W		L		T
Yale		–		10	–	0	–	0
Penn		–		12	–	0	–	1
Temple		–		2	–	0	–	1
Dartmouth		–		7	–	1	–	2
Swarthmore		–		7	–	1	–	0
Western U. of Penn.		–		10	–	2	–	0
Princeton		–		8	–	2	–	0
Harvard		–		8	–	2	–	1
Washington & Jefferson		–		10	–	3	–	0
Lafayette		–		7	–	2	–	1
Wesleyan		–		7	–	2	–	1
Carlisle		–		10	–	4	–	0
Penn State		–		8	–	3	–	0
Syracuse		–		8	–	3	–	0
Fordham		–		5	–	2	–	0
Amherst		–		3	–	1	–	2
Holy Cross		–		6	–	3	–	0
Brown		–		7	–	4	–	0
Tufts		–		5	–	3	–	0
Vermont		–		6	–	4	–	1
Cornell		–		6	–	4	–	0
Colgate		–		5	–	4	–	0
Columbia		–		4	–	3	–	2
Army		–		4	–	4	–	1
Bucknell		–		5	–	5	–	0
Dickinson		–		4	–	4	–	0
NYU		–		3	–	3	–	1
Lehigh		–		6	–	7	–	0
Franklin & Marshall		–		4	–	6	–	0
Geneva		–		4	–	6	–	0
New Hampshire		–		2	–	4	–	2
Springfield Training School		–		3	–	5	–	0
Rutgers		–		3	–	6	–	0
Villanova		–		3	–	7	–	0
Drexel		–		1	–	7	–	0

The 1905 Rutgers Queensmen football team represented Rutgers University as an independent during the 1905 college football season. In their second, non-consecutive season under head coach Oliver D. Mann, the Queensmen compiled a 3–6 record and were outscored by their opponents, 99 to 44. The team captain was Harold F. Green.

== Schedule ==
Date	Opponent	Site	Result	Source
September 30	Stevens	Neilson Field; New Brunswick, NJ	W 6–0	
October 7	at Trinity (CT)	Hartford, CT	L 0–11	
October 14	at Union (NY)	Schenectady, NY	L 0–11	
October 21	Seton Hall	Neilson Field; New Brunswick, NJ	L 10–22	
October 28	at Delaware	Newark, DE	W 10–0	
November 7	at NYU	Ohio Field; Bronx, NY	L 7–10	
November 11	at Stevens	Cricket Grounds; Hoboken, NJ	W 5–0	
November 18	Haverford	Neilson Field; New Brunswick, NJ	L 0–28	
November 25	at Fordham	Fordham Field; Bronx, NY	L 6–17	
