= 1905 Brown Bears football team =

American college football season

1905 Brown Bears football
- Conference: Independent
- Record: 7–4
- Head coach: Edward N. Robinson (6th season)
- Captain: G. A. Russ
- Home stadium: Andrews Field

1905 Eastern college football independents records
	Conf.			Overall
Team	W	L	T	W		L		T
Yale		–		10	–	0	–	0
Penn		–		12	–	0	–	1
Temple		–		2	–	0	–	1
Dartmouth		–		7	–	1	–	2
Swarthmore		–		7	–	1	–	0
Western U. of Penn.		–		10	–	2	–	0
Princeton		–		8	–	2	–	0
Harvard		–		8	–	2	–	1
Washington & Jefferson		–		10	–	3	–	0
Lafayette		–		7	–	2	–	1
Wesleyan		–		7	–	2	–	1
Carlisle		–		10	–	4	–	0
Penn State		–		8	–	3	–	0
Syracuse		–		8	–	3	–	0
Fordham		–		5	–	2	–	0
Amherst		–		3	–	1	–	2
Holy Cross		–		6	–	3	–	0
Brown		–		7	–	4	–	0
Tufts		–		5	–	3	–	0
Vermont		–		6	–	4	–	1
Cornell		–		6	–	4	–	0
Colgate		–		5	–	4	–	0
Columbia		–		4	–	3	–	2
Army		–		4	–	4	–	1
Bucknell		–		5	–	5	–	0
Dickinson		–		4	–	4	–	0
NYU		–		3	–	3	–	1
Lehigh		–		6	–	7	–	0
Franklin & Marshall		–		4	–	6	–	0
Geneva		–		4	–	6	–	0
New Hampshire		–		2	–	4	–	2
Springfield Training School		–		3	–	5	–	0
Rutgers		–		3	–	6	–	0
Villanova		–		3	–	7	–	0
Drexel		–		1	–	7	–	0

The 1905 Brown Bears football team represented Brown University as an independent during the 1905 college football season. Led by sixth-year head coach Edward N. Robinson, Brown compiled a record of 7–4.

== Schedule ==
Date	Opponent	Site	Result	Attendance	Source
September 23	New Hampshire	Andrews Field; Providence, RI	W 16–5		
September 27	Massachusetts	Andrews Field; Providence, RI	W 24–0		
September 30	WPI	Andrews Field; Providence, RI	W 42–0		
October 7	Colby	Andrews Field; Providence, RI	W 70–0		
October 14	Maine	Andrews Field; Providence, RI	W 34–0		
October 21	at Penn	Franklin Field; Philadelphia, PA	L 6–8		
October 28	at Harvard	Harvard Stadium; Boston, MA	L 0–10		
November 4	Syracuse	Andrews Field; Providence, RI	W 27–0		
November 11	at Yale	Yale Field; New Haven, CT	L 0–11	3,000	
November 18	Vermont	Andrews Field; Providence, RI	W 56–0		
November 25	vs. Dartmouth	Hampden Park; Springfield, MA	L 6–24		
