= 1905 Columbia Blue and White football team =

American college football season

1905 Columbia Blue and White football
- Conference: Independent
- Record: 4–3–2
- Head coach: Bill Morley (4th season)
- Captain: John R. Fisher
- Home stadium: American League Park

1905 Eastern college football independents records
	Conf.			Overall
Team	W	L	T	W		L		T
Yale		–		10	–	0	–	0
Penn		–		12	–	0	–	1
Temple		–		2	–	0	–	1
Dartmouth		–		7	–	1	–	2
Swarthmore		–		7	–	1	–	0
Western U. of Penn.		–		10	–	2	–	0
Princeton		–		8	–	2	–	0
Harvard		–		8	–	2	–	1
Washington & Jefferson		–		10	–	3	–	0
Lafayette		–		7	–	2	–	1
Wesleyan		–		7	–	2	–	1
Carlisle		–		10	–	4	–	0
Penn State		–		8	–	3	–	0
Syracuse		–		8	–	3	–	0
Fordham		–		5	–	2	–	0
Amherst		–		3	–	1	–	2
Holy Cross		–		6	–	3	–	0
Brown		–		7	–	4	–	0
Tufts		–		5	–	3	–	0
Vermont		–		6	–	4	–	1
Cornell		–		6	–	4	–	0
Colgate		–		5	–	4	–	0
Columbia		–		4	–	3	–	2
Army		–		4	–	4	–	1
Bucknell		–		5	–	5	–	0
Dickinson		–		4	–	4	–	0
NYU		–		3	–	3	–	1
Lehigh		–		6	–	7	–	0
Franklin & Marshall		–		4	–	6	–	0
Geneva		–		4	–	6	–	0
New Hampshire		–		2	–	4	–	2
Springfield Training School		–		3	–	5	–	0
Rutgers		–		3	–	6	–	0
Villanova		–		3	–	7	–	0
Drexel		–		1	–	7	–	0

The 1905 Columbia Blue and White football team was an American football team that represented Columbia University as an independent during the 1905 college football season. In its fourth season under head coach Bill Morley, the team compiled a 4–3–2 record and was outscored by a total of 109 to 77. The team's three losses were to undefeated national champion Yale, undefeated Penn, and Princeton. John R. Fisher was the team captain.

Columbia's sports teams were commonly called the "Blue and White" in this era, but had no official nickname. The name "Lions" would not be adopted until 1910.

The team played its home games at the American League Park, a baseball park in the Washington Heights neighborhood of Upper Manhattan in New York City, and also the home field of the New York Yankees.

== Schedule ==
Date	Opponent	Site	Result	Attendance	Source
September 30	Union (NY)	American League Park; New York, NY	W 23–0		
October 4	Seton Hall	American League Park; New York, NY	W 21–0		
October 7	Wesleyan	American League Park; New York, NY	T 0–0		
October 14	Williams	American League Park; New York, NY	W 11–5		
October 21	Amherst	American League Park; New York, NY	T 10–10		
October 28	Princeton	American League Park; New York, NY	L 0–12	10,000	
November 4	Yale	American League Park; New York, NY	L 0–53	10,000	
November 18	at Cornell	Percy Field; Ithaca, NY (rivalry)	W 12–6		
November 25	Penn	American League Park; New York, NY	L 0–23	10,000	
