= 1905 NYU Violets football team =

American college football season

1905 NYU Violets football
- Conference: Independent
- Record: 3–3–1
- Head coach: Marshall Mills (1st season)
- Home stadium: Ohio Field

1905 Eastern college football independents records
| | Conf. | | | Overall |
| Team | W | L | T | W | | L | | T |
|---|---|---|---|---|---|---|---|---|
| Yale | | – | | 10 | – | 0 | – | 0 |
| Penn | | – | | 12 | – | 0 | – | 1 |
| Temple | | – | | 2 | – | 0 | – | 1 |
| Dartmouth | | – | | 7 | – | 1 | – | 2 |
| Swarthmore | | – | | 7 | – | 1 | – | 0 |
| Western U. of Penn. | | – | | 10 | – | 2 | – | 0 |
| Princeton | | – | | 8 | – | 2 | – | 0 |
| Harvard | | – | | 8 | – | 2 | – | 1 |
| Washington & Jefferson | | – | | 10 | – | 3 | – | 0 |
| Lafayette | | – | | 7 | – | 2 | – | 1 |
| Wesleyan | | – | | 7 | – | 2 | – | 1 |
| Carlisle | | – | | 10 | – | 4 | – | 0 |
| Penn State | | – | | 8 | – | 3 | – | 0 |
| Syracuse | | – | | 8 | – | 3 | – | 0 |
| Fordham | | – | | 5 | – | 2 | – | 0 |
| Amherst | | – | | 3 | – | 1 | – | 2 |
| Holy Cross | | – | | 6 | – | 3 | – | 0 |
| Brown | | – | | 7 | – | 4 | – | 0 |
| Tufts | | – | | 5 | – | 3 | – | 0 |
| Vermont | | – | | 6 | – | 4 | – | 1 |
| Cornell | | – | | 6 | – | 4 | – | 0 |
| Colgate | | – | | 5 | – | 4 | – | 0 |
| Columbia | | – | | 4 | – | 3 | – | 2 |
| Army | | – | | 4 | – | 4 | – | 1 |
| Bucknell | | – | | 5 | – | 5 | – | 0 |
| Dickinson | | – | | 4 | – | 4 | – | 0 |
| NYU | | – | | 3 | – | 3 | – | 1 |
| Lehigh | | – | | 6 | – | 7 | – | 0 |
| Franklin & Marshall | | – | | 4 | – | 6 | – | 0 |
| Geneva | | – | | 4 | – | 6 | – | 0 |
| New Hampshire | | – | | 2 | – | 4 | – | 2 |
| Springfield Training School | | – | | 3 | – | 5 | – | 0 |
| Rutgers | | – | | 3 | – | 6 | – | 0 |
| Villanova | | – | | 3 | – | 7 | – | 0 |
| Drexel | | – | | 1 | – | 7 | – | 0 |

The 1905 NYU Violets football team was an American football team that represented New York University as an independent during the 1905 college football season. In their only year under head coach Marshall Mills, the team compiled a 3–3–1 record.

== Schedule ==
| Date | Opponent | Site | Result | Source |
|---|---|---|---|---|
| October 7 | Lehigh | Ohio Field; Bronx, NY | L 2–11 | |
| October 14 | at Trinity (CT) | Trinity Field; Hartford, CT | T 0–0 | |
| October 21 | Wesleyan | Ohio Field; Bronx, NY | L 0–31 | |
| October 28 | Stevens | Ohio Field; Bronx, NY | L 0–23 | |
| November 7 | Rutgers | Ohio Field; Bronx, NY | W 10–7 | |
| November 11 | RPI | Ohio Field; Bronx, NY | W 17–2 | |
| November 25 | Union (NY) | Ohio Field; Bronx, NY | W 11–0 | |
