= 1905 Princeton Tigers football team =

American college football season

1905 Princeton Tigers football
- Conference: Independent
- Record: 8–2
- Head coach: Art Hillebrand (3rd season)
- Captain: James Cooney
- Home stadium: University Field

1905 Eastern college football independents records
	Conf.			Overall
Team	W	L	T	W		L		T
Yale		–		10	–	0	–	0
Penn		–		12	–	0	–	1
Temple		–		2	–	0	–	1
Dartmouth		–		7	–	1	–	2
Swarthmore		–		7	–	1	–	0
Western U. of Penn.		–		10	–	2	–	0
Princeton		–		8	–	2	–	0
Harvard		–		8	–	2	–	1
Washington & Jefferson		–		10	–	3	–	0
Lafayette		–		7	–	2	–	1
Wesleyan		–		7	–	2	–	1
Carlisle		–		10	–	4	–	0
Penn State		–		8	–	3	–	0
Syracuse		–		8	–	3	–	0
Fordham		–		5	–	2	–	0
Amherst		–		3	–	1	–	2
Holy Cross		–		6	–	3	–	0
Brown		–		7	–	4	–	0
Tufts		–		5	–	3	–	0
Vermont		–		6	–	4	–	1
Cornell		–		6	–	4	–	0
Colgate		–		5	–	4	–	0
Columbia		–		4	–	3	–	2
Army		–		4	–	4	–	1
Bucknell		–		5	–	5	–	0
Dickinson		–		4	–	4	–	0
NYU		–		3	–	3	–	1
Lehigh		–		6	–	7	–	0
Frankin & Marshall		–		4	–	6	–	0
Geneva		–		4	–	6	–	0
New Hampshire		–		2	–	4	–	2
Springfield Training School		–		3	–	5	–	0
Rutgers		–		3	–	6	–	0
Villanova		–		3	–	7	–	0
Drexel		–		1	–	7	–	0

The 1905 Princeton Tigers football team represented Princeton University in the 1905 college football season. The team finished with an 8–2 record under third-year head coach Art Hillebrand and outscored its opponents by a total of 229 to 45. Princeton fullback Jim McCormick was selected as a consensus first-team honoree on the 1905 College Football All-America Team. Tackle James Cooney was also selected as a first-team All-American by The New York Times.

== Schedule ==
Date	Opponent	Site	Result	Attendance	Source
September 23	Villanova	University Field; Princeton, NJ	W 41–0		
September 30	Washington & Jefferson	University Field; Princeton, NJ	W 23–0		
October 7	Georgetown	University Field; Princeton, NJ	W 34–0		
October 11	Lehigh	University Field; Princeton, NJ	W 29–6		
October 14	Bucknell	University Field; Princeton, NJ	W 48–0		
October 21	Lafayette	University Field; Princeton, NJ	W 22–4		
October 28	at Columbia	American League Park; New York, NY	W 12–0	10,000	
November 4	Dartmouth	University Field; Princeton, NJ	L 0–6		
November 11	Cornell	University Field; Princeton, NJ	W 16–6		
November 18	at Yale	Yale Field; New Haven, CT (rivalry)	L 4–23	22,000	
