= 1905 Bucknell football team =

American college football season

1905 Bucknell football
- Conference: Independent
- Record: 5–5
- Head coach: George W. Hoskins (7th season)
- Captain: Charles Cooper

1905 Eastern college football independents records
	Conf.			Overall
Team	W	L	T	W		L		T
Yale		–		10	–	0	–	0
Penn		–		12	–	0	–	1
Temple		–		2	–	0	–	1
Dartmouth		–		7	–	1	–	2
Swarthmore		–		7	–	1	–	0
Western U. of Penn.		–		10	–	2	–	0
Princeton		–		8	–	2	–	0
Harvard		–		8	–	2	–	1
Washington & Jefferson		–		10	–	3	–	0
Lafayette		–		7	–	2	–	1
Wesleyan		–		7	–	2	–	1
Carlisle		–		10	–	4	–	0
Penn State		–		8	–	3	–	0
Syracuse		–		8	–	3	–	0
Fordham		–		5	–	2	–	0
Amherst		–		3	–	1	–	2
Holy Cross		–		6	–	3	–	0
Brown		–		7	–	4	–	0
Tufts		–		5	–	3	–	0
Vermont		–		6	–	4	–	1
Cornell		–		6	–	4	–	0
Colgate		–		5	–	4	–	0
Columbia		–		4	–	3	–	2
Army		–		4	–	4	–	1
Bucknell		–		5	–	5	–	0
Dickinson		–		4	–	4	–	0
NYU		–		3	–	3	–	1
Lehigh		–		6	–	7	–	0
Franklin & Marshall		–		4	–	6	–	0
Geneva		–		4	–	6	–	0
New Hampshire		–		2	–	4	–	2
Springfield Training School		–		3	–	5	–	0
Rutgers		–		3	–	6	–	0
Villanova		–		3	–	7	–	0
Drexel		–		1	–	7	–	0

The 1905 Bucknell football team was an American football team that represented Bucknell University as an independent during the 1905 college football season. Led by seventh-year head coach George W. Hoskins, the team compiled a 5–5 record. Charles Cooper was the team captain.

== Schedule ==
Date	Time	Opponent	Site	Result	Attendance	Source
September 23		Lebanon Valley	Lewisburg, PA	W 29–0		
September 30		Mansfield	Lewisburg, PA	W 27–0		
October 7		at Cornell	Percy Field; Ithaca, NY	L 0–24		
October 14		at Princeton	University Field; Princeton, NJ	L 0–48		
October 21		at Virginia	Lafayette Field; Norfolk, VA	L 11–15		
November 1		Medico-Chirurgical	Lewisburg, PA	W 18–5		
November 11		at Navy	Worden Field; Annapolis, MD	L 0–34		
November 18		at Georgetown	Georgetown Field; Washington, DC	W 18–0		
November 25		vs. Villanova	Harrisburg, PA	W 17–9		
November 30		at Lafayette	March Field Easton, PA	L 0–47		
