= 1905 Geneva Covenanters football team =

American college football season

1905 Geneva Covenanters football
- Conference: Independent
- Record: 4–6
- Head coach: Archibald Leech (1st season)

1905 Eastern college football independents records
	Conf.			Overall
Team	W	L	T	W		L		T
Yale		–		10	–	0	–	0
Penn		–		12	–	0	–	1
Temple		–		2	–	0	–	1
Dartmouth		–		7	–	1	–	2
Swarthmore		–		7	–	1	–	0
Western U. of Penn.		–		10	–	2	–	0
Princeton		–		8	–	2	–	0
Harvard		–		8	–	2	–	1
Washington & Jefferson		–		10	–	3	–	0
Lafayette		–		7	–	2	–	1
Wesleyan		–		7	–	2	–	1
Carlisle		–		10	–	4	–	0
Penn State		–		8	–	3	–	0
Syracuse		–		8	–	3	–	0
Fordham		–		5	–	2	–	0
Amherst		–		3	–	1	–	2
Holy Cross		–		6	–	3	–	0
Brown		–		7	–	4	–	0
Tufts		–		5	–	3	–	0
Vermont		–		6	–	4	–	1
Cornell		–		6	–	4	–	0
Colgate		–		5	–	4	–	0
Columbia		–		4	–	3	–	2
Army		–		4	–	4	–	1
Bucknell		–		5	–	5	–	0
Dickinson		–		4	–	4	–	0
NYU		–		3	–	3	–	1
Lehigh		–		6	–	7	–	0
Franklin & Marshall		–		4	–	6	–	0
Geneva		–		4	–	6	–	0
New Hampshire		–		2	–	4	–	2
Springfield Training School		–		3	–	5	–	0
Rutgers		–		3	–	6	–	0
Villanova		–		3	–	7	–	0
Drexel		–		1	–	7	–	0

The 1905 Geneva Covenanters football team was an American football team that represented Geneva College as an independent during the 1905 college football season. In their first season under head coach Archibald Leech, the Covenanters compiled a 4–6 record.

== Schedule ==
Date	Opponent	Site	Result	Attendance	Source
September 30	Alumni	Beaver Falls, PA	W 10–0		
October 7	Allegheny	Beaver Falls, PA	W 11–0		
October 11	at Washington & Jefferson	Washington, PA	L 0–38		
October 14	Grove City	Beaver Falls, PA	W 7–0		
October 21	Westminster (PA)	Beaver Falls, PA	L 0–47		
November 1	at Allegheny	Meadville, PA	L 5–6		
November 4	at Grove City	Grove City, PA	W 5–0		
November 11	at Penn State	Beaver Field; State College, PA	L 0–73		
November 18	at Westminster (PA)	New Wilmington, PA	L 0–17		
November 25	Western University of Pennsylvania	Beaver Falls, PA	L 0–12	1,500	
