= 1905 Western University of Pennsylvania football team =

American college football season

1905 Western University of Pennsylvania football
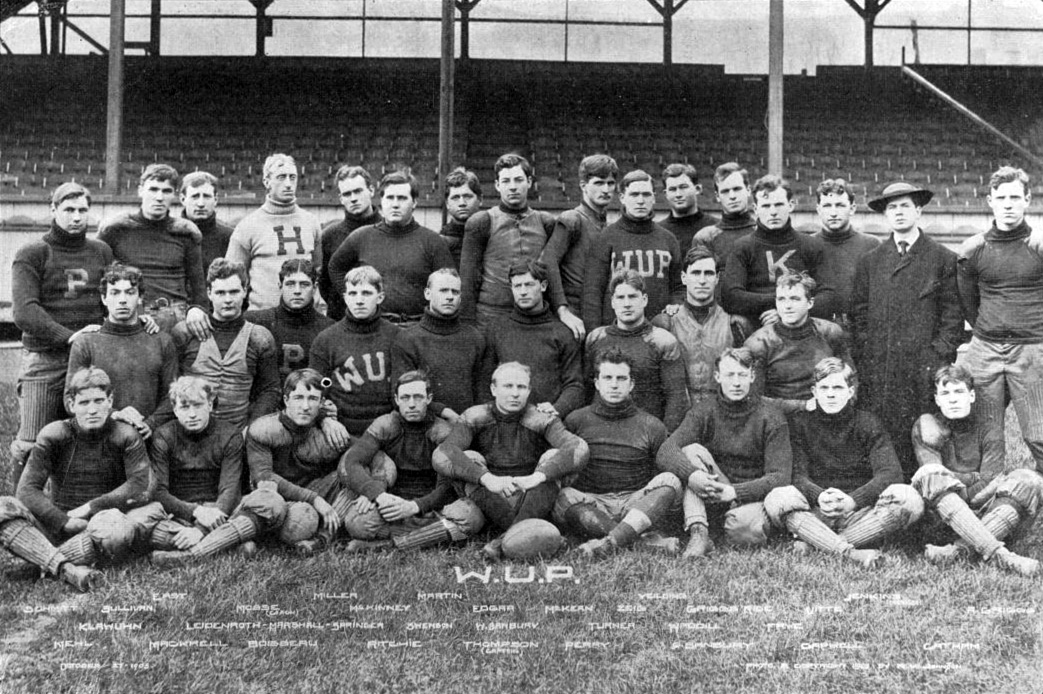
- Conference: Independent
- Record: 11–2
- Head coach: Arthur Mosse (3rd season)
- Captain: Joseph H. Thompson
- Home stadium: Exposition Park

1905 Eastern college football independents records
	Conf.			Overall
Team	W	L	T	W		L		T
Yale		–		10	–	0	–	0
Penn		–		12	–	0	–	1
Temple		–		2	–	0	–	1
Dartmouth		–		7	–	1	–	2
Swarthmore		–		7	–	1	–	0
Western U. of Penn.		–		10	–	2	–	0
Princeton		–		8	–	2	–	0
Harvard		–		8	–	2	–	1
Washington & Jefferson		–		10	–	3	–	0
Lafayette		–		7	–	2	–	1
Wesleyan		–		7	–	2	–	1
Carlisle		–		10	–	4	–	0
Penn State		–		8	–	3	–	0
Syracuse		–		8	–	3	–	0
Fordham		–		5	–	2	–	0
Amherst		–		3	–	1	–	2
Holy Cross		–		6	–	3	–	0
Brown		–		7	–	4	–	0
Tufts		–		5	–	3	–	0
Vermont		–		6	–	4	–	1
Cornell		–		6	–	4	–	0
Colgate		–		5	–	4	–	0
Columbia		–		4	–	3	–	2
Army		–		4	–	4	–	1
Bucknell		–		5	–	5	–	0
Dickinson		–		4	–	4	–	0
NYU		–		3	–	3	–	1
Lehigh		–		6	–	7	–	0
Franklin & Marshall		–		4	–	6	–	0
Geneva		–		4	–	6	–	0
New Hampshire		–		2	–	4	–	2
Springfield Training School		–		3	–	5	–	0
Rutgers		–		3	–	6	–	0
Villanova		–		3	–	7	–	0
Drexel		–		1	–	7	–	0

The 1905 Western University of Pennsylvania football team was an American football team that represented Western University of Pennsylvania (later renamed the University of Pittsburgh) as an independent during the 1905 college football season.

== Schedule ==
Date	Opponent	Site	Result	Attendance	Source
September 30	at Butler YMCA	Butler, PA	W 6–0		
October 7	Westminster (PA)	Exposition Park; Pittsburgh, PA	W 11–0	3,000	
October 11	Butler A.C.	Exposition Park; Pittsburgh, PA	W 97–0	500	
October 14	California State Normal (PA)	Exposition Park; Pittsburgh, PA	W 71–0	2,000	
October 21	at Cornell	Percy Field; Ithaca, NY	L 0–30	2,200+	
October 28	Dickinson	Exposition Park; Pittsburgh, PA	W 24–10	4,000	
November 1	Mount Union	Exposition Park; Pittsburgh, PA	W 57–0	500	
November 4	Bethany (WV)	Exposition Park; Pittsburgh, PA	W 48–0		
November 7	Franklin & Marshall	Exposition Park; Pittsburgh, PA	W 53–0		
November 11	Washington & Jefferson	Exposition Park; Pittsburgh, PA	W 11–0	10,000+	
November 18	Ohio Medical	Exposition Park; Pittsburgh, PA	W 51–0	2,200	
November 25	at Geneva	Beaver Falls, PA	W 12–0	1,500	
November 30	Penn State	Exposition Park; Pittsburgh, PA (rivalry)	L 0–6	8,000	

== Season recap ==
The 1904 football season was a tremendous success both on the field and financially for the Western University of Pennsylvania. Coach Arthur Mosse wrote an in depth article for the December 4 edition of the Pittsburgh Press praising all the people in Pittsburgh who contributed to the team's success. He felt that the Western University athletics would continue to succeed with the foundation he put in place and college sports would become an integral part of the Pittsburgh culture. On December 5 the Athletic Committee met to discuss the state of affairs. They were pleased with the work of and probable retention of coach Mosse for the 1905 season. However, the players demanded that teammate Joe Thompson be given the coaching position. This heated debate spread through the alumni, faculty and student body. The Collegiate and Engineering departments wanted coach Mosse, the Dental and Medical departments were rooting for Joe Thompson. Some faculty and alumni feared the transferring of star players if Thompson left school. No solution was reached at the February 3 meeting of the Athletic Association. Coach Mosse continued working toward the 1905 season by setting up a schedule that was approved at the March 3rd Athletic Association meeting, but the naming of the coach was again put on hold. Chancellor Samuel McCormick and trustee George Clapp decided to intervene for the benefit of the University. At the April 7 Athletic Association meeting the problems were addressed and resolved to the satisfaction of all parties. Coach Arthur Mosse was retained for another year and Joe Thompson was named manager and captain of the team. The team played its home games at Exposition Park in Pittsburgh. In its third season under head coach Arthur Mosse, the team compiled an 11–2 record, shut out ten of its thirteen opponents, and outscored all opponents by a total of 435 to 46. Instead of celebrating another successful season on the gridiron, the players again demanded that Coach Mosse not be retained for the 1906 season or they would transfer. And so came another winter of discontent in the Western University Athletic Association.

== Coaching staff ==
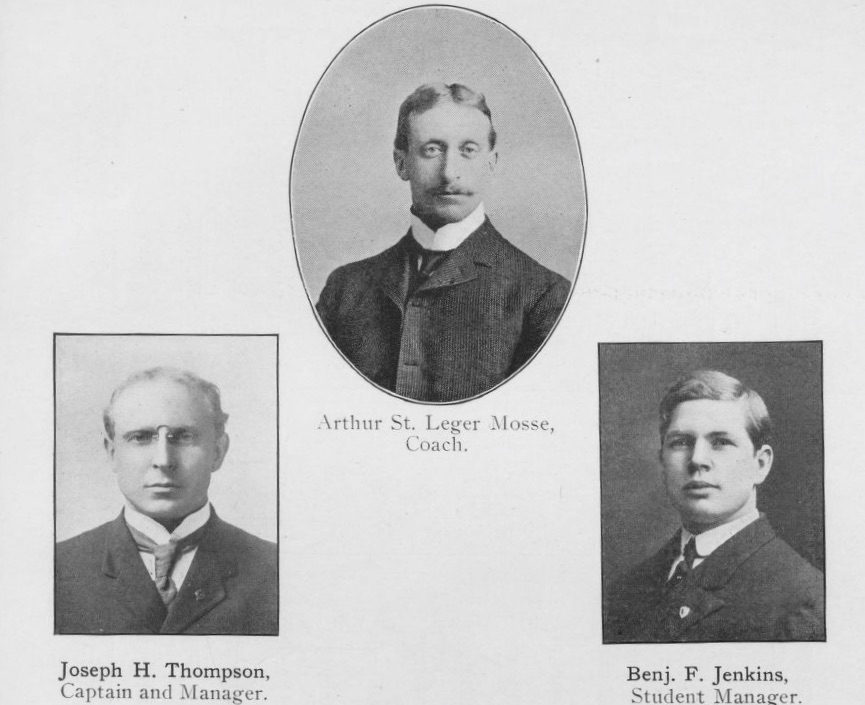
1905 Coaching Staff

1905 WUP football staff
Coaching Staff: Arthur Mosse – Head Coach; Joseph H. Thompson - Manager/Captain	Support Staff: Benjamin F. Jenkins - Assistant Manager

== Roster ==
1905 Western University of Pennsylvania football roster
Player	Position	Games	Height	Weight	Class	Prep School	Degree	Residence
Theodore Perry	end	9	5' 8"	168	1907	Haskell Institute	Associate Dental	Pierre, SD
Quincy Banbury	end	9	5' 7"	155	1908	Salina H.S. (KS)	Doctor of Dental Surgery	Wichita, KS
Gilbert Miller	tackle	9	5' 11"	176	1906	Butler H.S.	Associate Engineering	
Leslie Waddill	tackle	12	6'	178	1907	Warrensburg Normal (MO)	Doctor of Dental Surgery	Pittsburgh, PA
Waldemar Zieg	guard	9	5' 10"	182	1910	Allegheny H. S.	Engineer of Mines	Pittsburgh, PA
C.R. McKinney	guard	6	5' 9"	219	1912	East Liberty Academy	Associate Medical	Dravosburg, PA
Paul Vitte	guard	3	5' 8"	176	1907	Allegheny H.S.	went into business	
Arthur McKean	center	8	6' 1"	175	1905	Geneva College	Bachelor of Arts/ Law School	Beaver Falls, PA
Curt Leidenroth	center	4	5' 11"	180	1906	Allegheny H.S.	Doctor of Dental Surgery	Bellevue, PA
Joseph Edgar	guard	6	6'	178	1908	Geneva College	Doctor of Medicine	Oakmont, PA
Arthur Yielding	guard	12	5' 11"	220	1909	Guthrie H.S. (OK)	Doctor of Medicine	Portland, OR
John Sullivan	guard	4	6'	170	1908	Pittsburg College	Pittsburgh, PA	
Calvin Marshall	tackle	8	6'	187	1908	Gloucester H.S. (MA)	Doctor of Medicine	Mt. Oliver, PA
Jack Turner	tackle	9	5' 8"	189	1908	Salina H.S. (KS)	Associate Law	Gregg, PA
Walter East	end	9	5' 10"	170	1906	Geneva College		
Millard Frye	end	6	5' 7"	168	1908	Carnegie H.S.	Doctor of Dental Surgery	Homer City, PA
Edgar Chatham	end	0	5' 7"	150	1909	Allegheny H.S.	Doctor of Medicine	Pittsburgh, PA
Frank Griggs	quarterback	6	5' 11"	165	1908	Topeka H.S. (KS)	dropped out	Topeka, KS
Arthur Griggs	halfback	10	5' 10"	175	1908	Topeka H.S. (KS)	dropped out	Topeka, KS
Walter Ritchie	quarterback	5	5' 6"	145	1907	Bloomington Prep, (IL)	Doctor of Dental Surgery	Bloomington, IL
Charles Boisseau	quarterback	6	5' 7"	151	1907	Warrensburg Normal (MO)	Doctor of Dental Surgery	
Karl Swenson	quarterback	5	5' 8"	153	1908	Kansas Normal	Doctor of Medicine	Portland, OR
Joe Thompson	halfback	4	5' 8"	178	1908	Geneva College	Bachelor of Arts and Law Degree	Beaver Falls, PA
Charles Springer	halfback	6	5' 10"	168	1908	Dean Academy	Associate Engineering	Pittsburgh, PA
Albert Schmidt	halfback	10	5' 8"	180	1908	Pittsburgh H.S.	Doctor of Medicine	Turtle Creek, PA
Frederick Klawuhn	halfback	7	5' 8"	170	1908	Ridgeway H.S.	Doctor of Dental Surgery	Ridgeway, PA
Winfred Banbury	fullback	11	5' 10"	165	1907	Salina H.S. (KS)	Doctor of Dental Surgery	Pratt, KS
Omar Mehl	fullback	8	5' 7"	163	1908	Topeka H.S. (KS)	Doctor of Medicine	Braddock, PA
Plummer Capwell	fullback	7	5' 10"	170	1907	Franklin H.S.	Associate Pharmacy	Franklin, PA
John Mackrell	fullback	3	5' 8"	150	1909	Pittsburgh Academy	Doctor of Medicine	Pittsburgh, PA
Martin	guard	3						
William Rice	halfback	1						

== Game summaries ==
=== At Butler YMCA ===
WUP at Butler YMCA

Team	1	2	Total
• WUP	6	0	6
Butler YMCA	0	0	0

- Date: October 1, 1905
- Location: Butler Grounds
  Butler, PA
- Referee: Dr. Martin (Allegheny) and Malloy (Butler)

A game was arranged with the Butler YMCA on the Butler Grounds for Saturday, September 30 after Grove City College cancelled their scheduled game with the Western University. A number of starters were recovering from injuries since Coach Mosse worked the team hard the week leading up to this practice game. The Butler YMCA proved to be a formidable opponent. On their first possession the Butler boys gained a couple of first downs and were then forced to punt. The WUP offense marched down the field and Jud Schmidt scored a touchdown from inside the five yard line. Walter Zieg kicked the goal after and the score was 6–0 in favor of WUP. On their next possession the WUP backs, Jud Schmidt and Henry Boisseau, worked the ball deep into Butler territory and then fumbled on the Butler ten yard line. Butler gained some yardage but was again forced to punt. The WUP offense was able to gain yardage and was on the Butler four yard line when the halftime whistle blew. Coach Mosse substituted so every player got some playing time. In the second half Butler objected to coaches Mosse and Thompson giving instructions during plays. A minor skirmish was quickly settled. This action aroused the crowd to get close to the action and disrupt play. Neither team was pleased with the fans behavior. The final score read 6–0 in favor of WUP.

The WUP lineup for the practice game against Butler YMCA was Ted Perry (left end), John Turner (left tackle), Waldy Zieg (left guard), Curt Leidenroth (center), Arthur Yielding (right guard), Calvin Marshall (right tackle), Gilbert Miller (right end), Henry Boisseau (quarterback), Jud Schmidt (right halfback), Art Griggs (left halfback), and Omar Mehl (fullback). Substitutions made during the game were: Arthur McKean replaced Curt Leidenroth at center; Joe Edgar replaced Yielding at right guard; Quince Banbury replaced Ted Perry at left end; Walter Ritchie replaced Henry Boisseau at quarterback; Winfred Banbury replaced Jud Schmidt at right halfback; Plummer Capwell replaced Omar Mehl at fullback; and Bill Rice replaced Plummer Capwell at fullback.

=== Westminster ===
Westminster at WUP

Team	1	2	Total
Westminster	0	6	6
• WUP	0	11	11

- Date: October 7, 1905
- Location: Friendship Park
  Pittsburgh, PA
- Game attendance: 3,000
- Referee: Harry C. Fry Jr. and Mays Edmundson

The home opener for the WUP eleven against the Westminster Titans was played at Friendship Park because the Pirates were still in season. The WUP lineup was missing players who were injured in the Butler game and in practice. Rice, Swenson, W. Banbury, Capwell, Klawuhn and F. Griggs were on the injured list. The Pittsburgh Press estimated the crowd at better than three thousand. The WUP students with their horns and cowbells paraded into the stadium behind the Fourteenth Regiment Band. The game was delayed due to an argument about the umpire and the length of each half. Westminster would not play unless Mays Edmondson, former captain of the Westminster team, was the umpire. They also wanted to play fifteen minute halves. Captain Thompson finally agreed to let Edmondson umpire. There would be one twenty-five minute half and one fifteen minute half.

The lighter Westminster eleven surprised the WUP team with their speed. The Titans advanced the ball to the WUP fifteen yard line but the WUP defense held. The WUP offense then moved the ball five yards at a time to the ten yard line of Westminster. The Titans held the University boys on downs and proceeded to carry the ball back to midfield. Walter Zieg was disqualified for rough play and substitutions were made. The first half ended with Westminster in WUP territory.

Westminster quarterback Milton Scott raced eighty-five yards for a touchdown on their second possession of the second half. Locke was successful on the goal kick and WUP was losing 6–0. Walter Ritchie replaced Frank Griggs at quarterback. Art Griggs received the kickoff and returned it to the thirty yard line. The WUP offense went to work and methodically ran the ball down the field. Jud Schmidt, Winfred Banbury and Theodore Perry did the bulk of the ball carrying with Schmidt finally plunging into the end zone for the touchdown. He also kicked the goal after to tie the score. The WUP defense forced the Titans to punt from deep in their own territory on their next possession. Art Griggs returned the punt to the Titans thirty-five yard line. On the third play from scrimmage Griggs raced thirty yards for the go-ahead touchdown. Schmidt missed the goal after. The game ended forty-five seconds later with the score 11–6 in favor of WUP.

The WUP lineup for the game against Westminster was Ted Perry (left end), John Turner (left tackle), Leslie Waddill (left guard), Curt Leidenroth (center), Arthur Yielding (right guard), Waldy Zieg (right tackle), Gilbert Miller (right end), Frank Griggs (quarterback), Jud Schmidt (right halfback), Joe Thompson (left halfback), and Omar Mehl (fullback). Substitutions made during the game were: Quince Banbury replaced Jud Schmidt at right halfback; Jud Schmidt replaced Waldy Zieg at right tackle; Walter Ritchie replaced Frank Griggs at quarterback; and Art Griggs replaced Joe Thompson at left halfback.

=== Butler A.C. ===
Butler A.C. at WUP

Team	1	2	Total
Butler A.C.	0	0	0
• WUP	54	43	97

- Date: October 11, 1905
- Location: Exposition Park
  Pittsburgh, PA
- Game attendance: 500
- Referee: Dr. John L. Martin

On October 11 a crowd of five hundred students ignored the heavy rain and cheered on the WUP to a lopsided victory over the Butler A.C. at Exposition Park. The WUPs scored eighteen touchdowns. All the starters scored except the center Art McKean. Butler could not stop the WUP offense. Butler never made a first down. Due to injuries to the Butler roster, WUP tackle Martin played the second half for Butler. The only negative for the WUP was the eleven missed goal kicks. The final score read 97–0. This was the largest margin of victory in Pittsburgh football history.

The WUP lineup for the game against Butler A. C. was Quince Banbury (left end), John Turner (left tackle), Waldy Zieg (left guard), Arthur McKean (center), Arthur Yielding (right guard), Leslie Waddill (right tackle), Walter East (right end), Walter Ritchie (quarterback), Jud Schmidt (right halfback), Art Griggs (left halfback), and Winfred Banbury (fullback). Substitutes used in this game were John Sullivan, Fred Klawuhn, Charles Springer, Jay Frye, Karl Swenson, Frank Griggs and Plummer Capwell. This game consisted of one twenty-five minute half and one fifteen minute half.

After the WUP played the practice game in Butler, Joe Thompson wanted to play against the same team back in Pittsburgh. The YMCA manager could not honor his request and declined the offer. Another gentleman approached Mr. Thompson and assured him he could bring a strong team to Pittsburgh on the 11th and compete with the WUP eleven. This was not the same team that played so well against the WUP on September 30.

=== California Normal/YMCA ===
California Normal YMCA at WUP

Team	1	2	Total
California	0	0	0
• WUP	49	22	71

- Date: October 14, 1905
- Location: Exposition Park
  Pittsburgh, PA
- Game attendance: 2,000
- Referee: Ed. P. Young (Cornell)

The California Normal/YMCA football team came to Exposition Park on October 14 and were shellacked by WUP. Close to two thousand spectators watched the WUP backs run through the porous YMCA defense at will. Winfred Banbury scored six touchdowns in the first half, including a 105 yard kickoff return, and WUP led 49–0 at the break. Coach Mosse made wholesale substitutions for the second half, but the WUP offense was still able to score four more touchdowns. The final score was 71–0. Coach Mosse was pleased with team and wrote a paragraph for the Pittsburgh Press:

"I am more than pleased with the showing the boys made today against their heavy opponents, and feel that they are coming back in form. The showing of the additions to our squad, W. Banbury, Griggs and Turner, was particularly gratifying. I wanted to give all the boys a chance to show their worth in today's game, and consequently used nearly all the squad. They all showed up well, and with another week's training I think we will be in good shape to give Cornell a battle royal."

The WUP lineup for the game against California Normal was Quince Banbury (left end), John Turner (left tackle), Waldy Zieg (left guard), Arthur McKean (center), Joe Edgar (right guard), Calvin Marshall (right tackle), Walter East (right end), Walter Ritchie (quarterback), Jud Schmidt (right halfback), Art Griggs (left halfback), and Winfred Banbury (fullback). Substitutions made during the game were: Leslie Waddill replaced Waldy Zieg at left guard; Ted Perry replaced Quince Banbury at left end; Arthur Yielding replaced Joe Edgar at right guard; Frank Miller replaced Walter East at right end; Henry Boisseau replaced Walter Ritchie at quarterback; Omar Mehl replaced Winfred Banbury at fullback; and Winfred Banbury replaced Jud Schmidt at right halfback. The game consisted of one twenty-five minute half and one twenty minute half.

=== At Cornell ===
WUP at Cornell

Team	1	2	Total
WUP	0	0	0
• Cornell	6	24	30

- Date: October 21, 1905
- Location: Percy Field
  Ithaca, NY
- Game attendance: 2,200
- Referee: R. N. Hockenberry (Syracuse)

On October 21 Percy Field in Ithaca N.Y. was the site of the game between the Cornell Big Red and the Western University eleven. The Cornell coach was Glen Scobey "Pop" Warner, who would coach at the University of Pittsburgh from 1915-1923. The Cornell lads outweighed the WUPs by ten to fifteen pounds per man. Coach Mosse was confident his team could compete. The WUP defense held the Big Red to one first half touchdown, but the offense could not sustain a drive. Late in the first half Cornell started a drive from their own forty-five yard line and steadily moved the ball downfield. Cornell halfback Martin scampered the last fifteen yards into the end zone. The goal kick after by Halliday was successful. The halftime score was 6–0 in favor of Cornell.

The WUP eleven produced no offense in the second half and their defense allowed the brawnier Cornell lads to score four more touchdowns. The final score was 30–0.

The Pittsburgh Press had summations from each coach. Coach Warner wrote:

"While we rolled up a rather large score against Mosse's men, the victory was no cinch by any means and had it not been that my boys had the advantage in weight over the Pennsylvanians the score would undoubtedly have been smaller. For a new team, the Smoky City lads showed up remarkably well and they fully lived up to the good word that had preceded their coming. In the first half they played well both offensively and defensively."

Coach Mosse wrote:

"Well, we were defeated by the Ithacans and although the score looks somewhat bad on paper, I can assure the loyal rooters of WUP that our team played valiantly, although outweighed 15 pounds to the man. We showed our real strength in the first half when we held our opponents down nicely but in the second half the weight against us told and were simply battered down. We are not discouraged in the least and the defeat will only spur us on to renewed vigor."

The WUP lineup for the game against Cornell was Ted Perry (left end), John Turner (left tackle), Leslie Waddill (left guard), Arthur McKean (center), Joe Edgar (right guard), Calvin Marshall (right tackle), Walter East (right end), Winfred Banbury (quarterback), Jud Schmidt (right halfback), Art Griggs (left halfback), and Quince Banbury (fullback). Substitutions made during the game were: Omar Mehl replaced Quince Banbury at fullback; Arthur Yielding replaced Joe Edgar at right guard; and after Mr. Yielding got ejected for fighting, Gilbert Miller replaced Arthur Yielding at right guard. This game consisted of thirty-five minute halves.

=== Dickinson ===
Dickinson at WUP

Team	1	2	Total
Dickinson	0	10	10
• WUP	6	18	24

- Date: October 28, 1905
- Location: Exposition Park
  Pittsburgh, PA
- Game attendance: 4,000
- Referee: R. N. Hockenberry (Syracuse)

Four thousand spectators crammed Exposition Park on October 28 to watch the WUP eleven take on the Red and White of Dickinson College from Carlisle, Pennsylvania Dickinson beat Washington & Jefferson the previous Thanksgiving Day, so they had some notoriety. The WUP offense received the opening kickoff and proceeded to sustain an eight minute drive that culminated with a Walter East fifteen yard scamper around left end for a touchdown. Jud Schmidt converted the goal kick after and WUP led 6–0. The rest of the half was a stalemate as both teams were able to move the ball but fumbles, penalties and occasional strong defense prohibited any scoring.

Early in the second half the WUP offense was deep in Red and White territory. Frank Griggs fumbled on the eight yard line. Dickinson halfback McIntire recovered and raced one hundred and two yards for the touchdown. Red and White captain Paul J. Davis kicked the goal after and the score was tied. The WUP offense went on another sustained drive that was aided by two Dickinson penalties. Art Griggs scored the go ahead touchdown and Schmidt was again good on the goal kick. WUP led 12–6. After a change of possessions, the WUP offense continued to gain yardage. Theodore Perry carried the ball the last ten yards for the score. Jud Schmidt was again successful on the goal kick. A few minutes later Dickinson quarterback Simpson fumbled a punt into the end zone. Theodore Perry fell on the ball for the WUP's last touchdown. Schmidt came through with the goal after and WUP led 24–6. With time running short, Davis lined up and kicked a 53-yard field goal (worth 4 points in 1905) to make the final score 24–10.

The WUP lineup for the game with Dickinson was Ted Perry (left end), Miller (left tackle), McKinney (left guard), John Turner (center), Arthur Yielding (right guard), Calvin Marshall (right tackle), Walter East (right end), Frank Griggs (quarterback), Jud Schmidt (right halfback), Art Griggs (left halfback), and Winfred Banbury (fullback). Substitutions made during the game were: Karl Swenson replaced Frank Griggs at quarterback; Omar Mehl replaced Winfred Banbury at fullback; Fred Klawuhn replaced Walter East at right end; Joe Edgar replaced Arthur Yielding at right guard; Arthur Yielding replaced McKinney at left guard; and Leslie Waddill replaced Joe Edgar at right guard. The game consisted of twenty-five minute halves.

=== Mount Union ===
Mount Union at WUP

Team	1	2	Total
Mount Union	0	0	0
• WUP	27	30	57

- Date: November 1, 1905
- Location: Exposition Park
  Pittsburgh, PA
- Game attendance: 500
- Referee: Dr. John L. Martin

On November 1 the Mount Union Purple Raiders from Alliance, Ohio met the WUP eleven at Exposition Park for a practice game. Coach Mosse started the scrub team. The second stringers showed their appreciation by scoring five first half touchdowns. Fullback John Mackrell made his first game appearance special by scoring two touchdowns. In the second half Coach Mosse inserted the first stringers into the lineup. Thirty more points were scored against the outmanned Purple Raiders and the final score read 57–0.

The WUP lineup for the game against Mount Union was Quince Banbury (left end), Leslie Waddill (left tackle), C. McKinney (left guard), Curt Leidenroth (center), Arthur Yielding (right guard), John Turner (right tackle), Jay Frye (right end), Karl Swenson (quarterback), Charles Springer (left halfback), Fred Klawuhn (right halfback), and John Mackrell (fullback). The following players were substituted into the game at halftime: Ted Perry, Gilbert Miller, John Sullivan, Arthur McKean, Calvin Marshall, Walter East, Art Griggs, Plummer Capwell, Jud Schmidt and Winfred Banbury. The game consisted of twenty-five minute halves.

=== Bethany ===
Bethany at WUP

Team	1	2	Total
Bethany	0	0	0
• WUP	42	6	48

- Date: November 4, 1905
- Location: Exposition Park
  Pittsburgh, PA
- Referee: Harry C. Fry Jr. (P.A.C.)

The Bethany Bison were the opponent on November 4. The WUP team expected some fierce competition from the West Virginians to prepare for the upcoming game with Washington & Jefferson. Coach Mosse started the first string and liked the results as they ran up a score of 42–0 in the first half. Walter East scored three touchdowns : two on short plunges and one on a thirty-five yard dash around end. Halfback Jud Schmidt, who had an eighty yard scamper, added two scores. Quincy Banbury scored on a thirty yard dash and Arthur Griggs plunged for a touchdown. The Bethany defense could not slow the WUP offense.

Wholesale substitutions were made at halftime and the WUP second team could only manage one touchdown by Leslie Waddill in the fifteen minute second half. Jud Schmidt was successful on seven goal kicks and John Sullivan converted the last one. The final score was 48–0.

The WUP lineup for the game with Bethany was Quince Banbury (left end), Gilbert Miller (left tackle), Leslie Waddill (left guard), Arthur McKean (center), Arthur Yielding (right guard), John Turner (right tackle), Walter East (right end), Frank Griggs (quarterback), Jud Schmidt (right halfback), Art Griggs (left halfback), and Winfred Banbury (fullback). Substitutions made during the game were: Charles Springer replaced Art Griggs at left halfback; C. McKinney replaced Gilbert Miller at left tackle; Fred Klawuhn replaced Jud Schmidt at right halfback; Plummer Capwell replaced Winfred Banbury at fullback; Curt Leidenroth replaced Arthur McKean at center; Jay Frye replaced Walter East at right end; Henry Boisseau replaced Frank Griggs at quarterback; and John Sullivan replaced Quince Banbury at left end. The game consisted of one twenty minute half and one fifteen minute half.

=== Franklin & Marshall ===
F & M at WUP

Team	1	2	Total
F & M	0	0	0
• WUP	23	30	53

- Date: November 7, 1905
- Location: Exposition Park
  Pittsburgh, PA
- Referee: Dr. W. A. Farrar (U. of Pennsylvania)

On November 7 the final tuneup for the Washington & Jefferson game was scheduled with Franklin & Marshall College of Lancaster, Pa. at Exposition Park. Coach Mosse started a lot of second teamers and substituted often. The WUP offense scored three touchdowns in the first eight minutes of play. The last touchdown of the first half was scored by Quincy Banbury on a 75-yard scamper. The score at halftime was 23–0 in favor of WUP.

The WUP defense only allowed one first down and held the Diplomats scoreless. The WUP offense scored five more touchdowns in the second half to make the final score 53–0.

The WUP lineup for the F & M game was Ted Perry (left end), Leslie Waddill (left tackle), Waldy Zieg (left guard), Arthur McKean (center), Arthur Yielding (right guard), Calvin Marshall (right tackle), Walter East (right end), Henry Boisseau (quarterback), Fred Klawuhn (right halfback), Joe Thompson (left halfback), and Omar Mehl (fullback). Substitutions made during the game were: Plummer Capwell replaced Omar Mehl at fullback; Jay Frye replaced Walter East at right end; Paul Vitte replaced Calvin Marshall at right tackle; C. McKinney replaced Waldy Zieg at left guard; Quince Banbury replaced Ted Perry at left end; and Charles Springer replaced Quince Banbury at left end. The game consisted of one twenty minute half and one fifteen minute half.

=== Washington & Jefferson ===
W & J at WUP

Team	1	2	Total
W & J	0	0	0
• WUP	6	5	11

- Date: November 11, 1905
- Location: Exposition Park
  Pittsburgh, PA
- Game attendance: 10,000
- Referee: O. Keson (Lehigh)

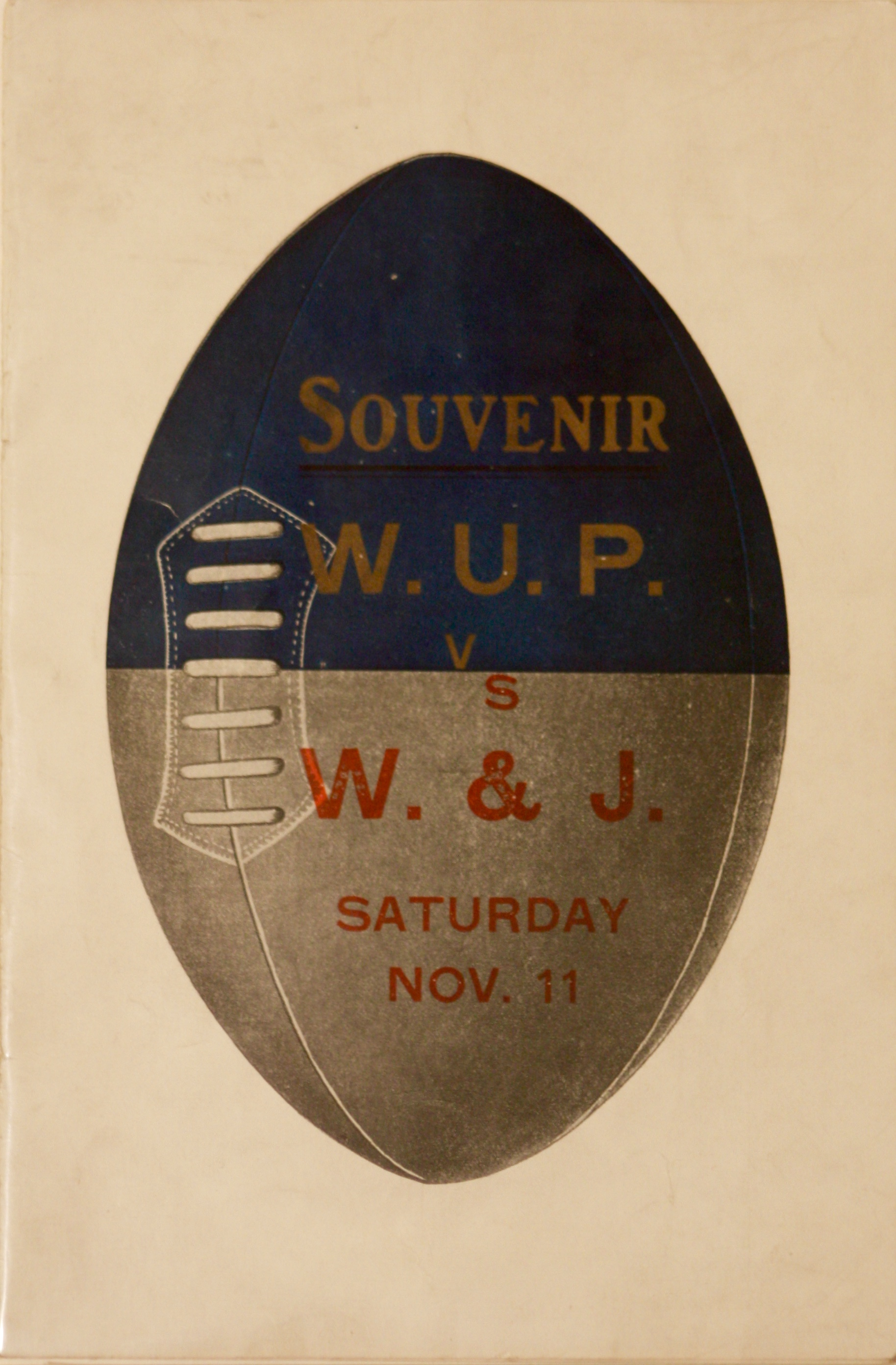
First WUP football program

The football teams of the Western University of Pennsylvania and Washington & Jefferson College played five games from 1890 to 1895. The WUPs were winless in the series and were outscored 130-12. November 11, 1905 was the first time the game was played in Pittsburgh. On Thursday, November 9, Chancellor Samuel B. McCormick held a meeting of students and alumni to thank them for their support of the team and to encourage wholesome participation in cheering and noise making at the football game against the Red and Black.

After the meeting eight hundred eager participants paraded to the practice field and cheered for the team. The Western University of Pennsylvania and Pittsburgh were ready for Saturday. A special scoreboard was erected to keep the fans informed of the score, down and time remaining. Bleachers were added to the visitors side of the field in anticipation of the large crowd. The Pittsburgh Post mentioned the availability of a program for sale at this game - “A special feature of the afternoon will be the artistic score cards which will be sold in the stands. The cards, which are intended for souvenirs, will contain the statistics of the two teams, the photographs of the coaches, managers and captains and the line-up.” The newly formed WUP band and drum corps would lead the parade of students from Union Station through downtown and into the stadium.

Both teams were healthy and at full strength. Over ten thousand people crammed Exposition Park for the game. On the WUPs third possession, Art Griggs returned a punt to the W & J seven yard line. Jud Schmidt carried it into the end zone on the next play. He then kicked the goal after and WUP led 6–0. The WUP offense moved the ball against the tough defense of the Red and Black, but penalties kept aborting the drives. The half came to an end with the WUPs on the W&J thirty-five yard line.

Omar Mehl replaced Winfred Banbury at fullback for the second half and did the bulk of the ball carrying. On their first possession of the second half the WUP offense worked the ball to the W&J ten yard line. They were then penalized fifteen yards for holding and turned the ball over to the Red and Black. The staunch WUP defense kept the Red and Black in their territory for the bulk of the second half. On the WUPs next possession they were able to sustain the drive and Omar Mehl carried the ball across the goal for the second touchdown of the game. Schmidt missed the goal kick after. The WUP offense had the ball on the W&J twenty yard line when time was called. The WUPs beat the Red and Black, 11–0.

The WUP lineup for the game against Washington & Jefferson was Ted Perry (left end), Gilbert Miller (left tackle), Waldy Zieg (left guard), Arthur McKean (center), Joe Edgar (right guard), Calvin Marshall (right tackle), Walter East (right end), Frank Griggs (quarterback), Jud Schmidt(right halfback), Art Griggs (left halfback), and Winfred Banbury (fullback). Substitutions made during the game were: Leslie Waddill replaced Waldy Zieg at left guard; John Sullivan replaced Art Griggs at left halfback; Joe Thompson replaced John Sullivan at left halfback; Omar Mehl replaced Winfred Banbury at fullback; Quince Banbury replaced Walter east at right end; and Fred Klawuhn replaced Jud Schmidt at right halfback. The game consisted of thirty-five minute halves

=== Ohio Medical ===
Ohio Med. at WUP

Team	1	2	Total
Ohio Med	4	0	4
• WUP	17	34	51

- Date: November 18, 1905
- Location: Exposition Park
  Pittsburgh, PA
- Game attendance: 2,200
- Referee: Harry C. Fry Jr. (P.A.C.)

The Ohio Medical University from Columbus, Ohio was the November 18 opponent. An added incentive for the fans was a scoreboard giving a play by play account of the Yale versus Princeton game. More than two thousand fans attended and the students were led into the stadium by the eighteen-piece school band conducted by Oliver Fulton (Class of 1906).

The WUP offense scored in the first five minutes on a 75-yard scamper by Joe Thompson and the rout was on. The final score was 51–4. The Medics had no answer for the powerful WUP offense. The highlight for the Ohioans was the field goal kicked by halfback Means late in the first half. Walter East, Karl Swenson and Plummer Capwell each scored two touchdowns. Joe Thompson, John Turner and Fred Klawuhn added one each. Coach Mosse substituted frequently and the entire squad finished the game injury free.

The WUP lineup for the game against Ohio Medical U. was Karl Swenson (left end), Gilbert Miller (left tackle), John Turner (left guard), Curt Leidenroth (center), Joe Edgar (right guard), Calvin Marshall (right tackle), Walter East (right end), Henry Boisseau (quarterback), Fred Klawuhn (right halfback), Joe Thompson (left halfback), and Winfred Banbury (fullback). Substitutions made during the game were: Walter Richie replaced Henry Boisseau at quarterback; Plummer Capwell replaced Winfred Banbury at fullback; Jay Frye replaced Walter East at right end; C. McKinney replaced Gilbert Miller at left tackle; and Ted Perry replaced Karl Swenson at left end. The game consisted of thirty-five minute halves.

=== At Geneva ===
WUP at Geneva

Team	1	2	Total
• WUP	6	6	12
Geneva	0	0	0

- Date: November 25, 1905
- Location: Geneva Field
  Beaver Falls, PA
- Game attendance: 1,500
- Referee: Harry C. Fry Jr. (P.A.C.)

On Saturday, November 25, the WUP football team took their second road trip of the season. Their destination was Beaver Falls, Pa. to battle the Geneva Covenanters. A special car was attached to the Beaver Falls Express train to accommodate all the students and band members wanting to attend the game.

WUP received the opening kickoff and marched down the field. Winfred Banbury carried the ball into the end zone from the three yard line four minutes into the game. Plummer Capwell kicked the goal after. After an exchange of punts, the WUP offense worked the ball to the three yard line again but were unable to score. After another exchange of punts, the WUP offense moved the ball downfield and were on the four yard line when the half ended with the score 6–0 in favor of WUP.

The second half mirrored the first as the WUP offense scored on their first possession. Karl Swenson raced into the end zone from eight yards out for the touchdown. Capwell was again successful on the goal kick after and the WUP lead was 12–0. The Geneva offense could not penetrate WUP territory. The WUP offense was able to reach the Geneva fifteen yard line but fumbled to thwart the drive. The game ended with the WUP eleven on the Geneva thirty yard line.

The WUP lineup for the game against Geneva was Karl Swenson (left end), Leslie Waddill (left tackle), Arthur Yielding (left guard), Waldy Zieg (center), C. McKinney (right guard), Paul Vitte (right tackle), Jay Frye (right end), Henry Boisseau (quarterback), Plummer Capwell (right halfback), Charles Springer (left halfback), and Winfred Banbury (fullback). Substitutions made during the game were: John Mackrell replaced Karl Swenson at left end; Andrew Martin replaced Arthur Yielding at left guard; and Walter Ritchie replaced Henry Boisseau at quarterback. The game consisted of one twenty-five minute half and one twenty minute half.

=== Penn State ===
Penn State at WUP

Team	1	2	Total
• Penn State	6	0	6
WUP	0	0	0

- Date: November 30, 1905
- Location: Exposition Park
  Pittsburgh, PA
- Game attendance: 10,000
- Referee: Ed. P. Young (Cornell)

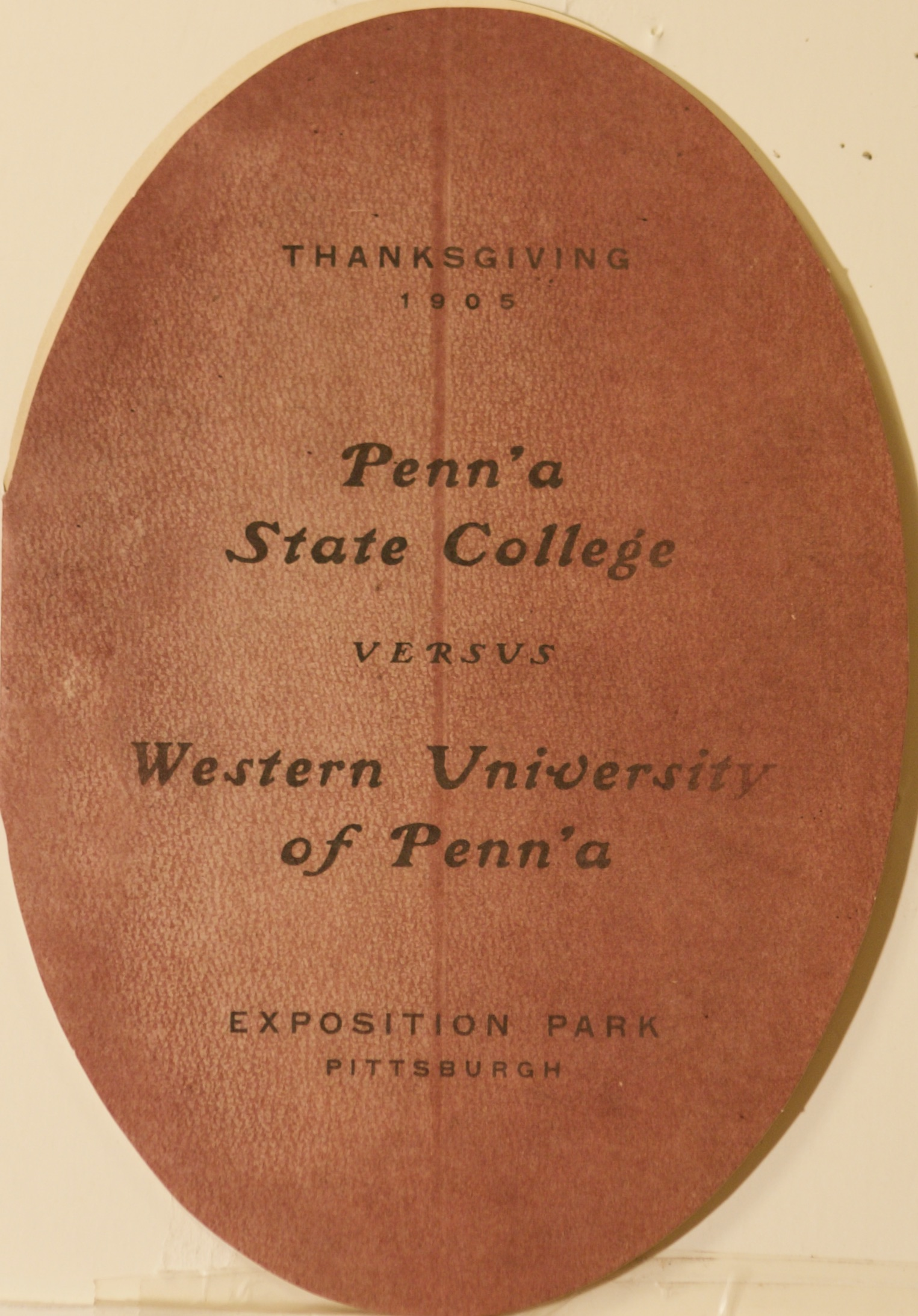
1905 WUP versus Penn State Scorecard

Almost ten thousand fans crammed into Exposition Park on a frigid Thanksgiving Day for the WUP versus State College game. The heavy rainfall earlier in the week caused drainage pipes to back up from the Allegheny River and flood the east end of the field from the twenty yard line to the end zone. The sight resembled an ice covered pond. The State College eleven was determined to avenge the previous year's loss to the WUP.

The first half was a fierce struggle between two evenly matched teams. Late in the half State College had the ball on the WUP twenty yard line next to the pond. The officials decided to move the ball to the other end of the field for safety reasons. With six seconds left in the half Irish McIlveen plunged into the end zone for the only touchdown of the game. George Yeckley was successful on the goal kick after and State led 6–0.

The WUP offense could not penetrate the State defense in the second half and lost for the second time in 1905. WUP finished the season 11–2.

The WUP lineup for the game against Penn State was Ted Perry (left end), Gilbert Miller (left tackle), Arthur Yielding (left guard), John Turner (center), Joe Edgar (right guard), Calvin Marshall (right tackle), Walter East (right end), Frank Griggs (quarterback), Jud Schmidt (right halfback), Art Griggs (left halfback), and Omar Mehl (fullback). Substitutions made during the game were: Leslie Waddill replaced Arthur Yielding at left guard; Winfred Banbury replaced Omar Mehl at fullback; Joe Thompson replaced Art Griggs at left halfback; Quince Banbury replaced Ted Perry at left end; Fred Klawuhn replaced Jud Schmidt at right halfback; and Waldy Zieg replaced Leslie Waddill at left guard. The game consisted of one thirty minute half and one twenty-five minute half.

== Scoring summary ==
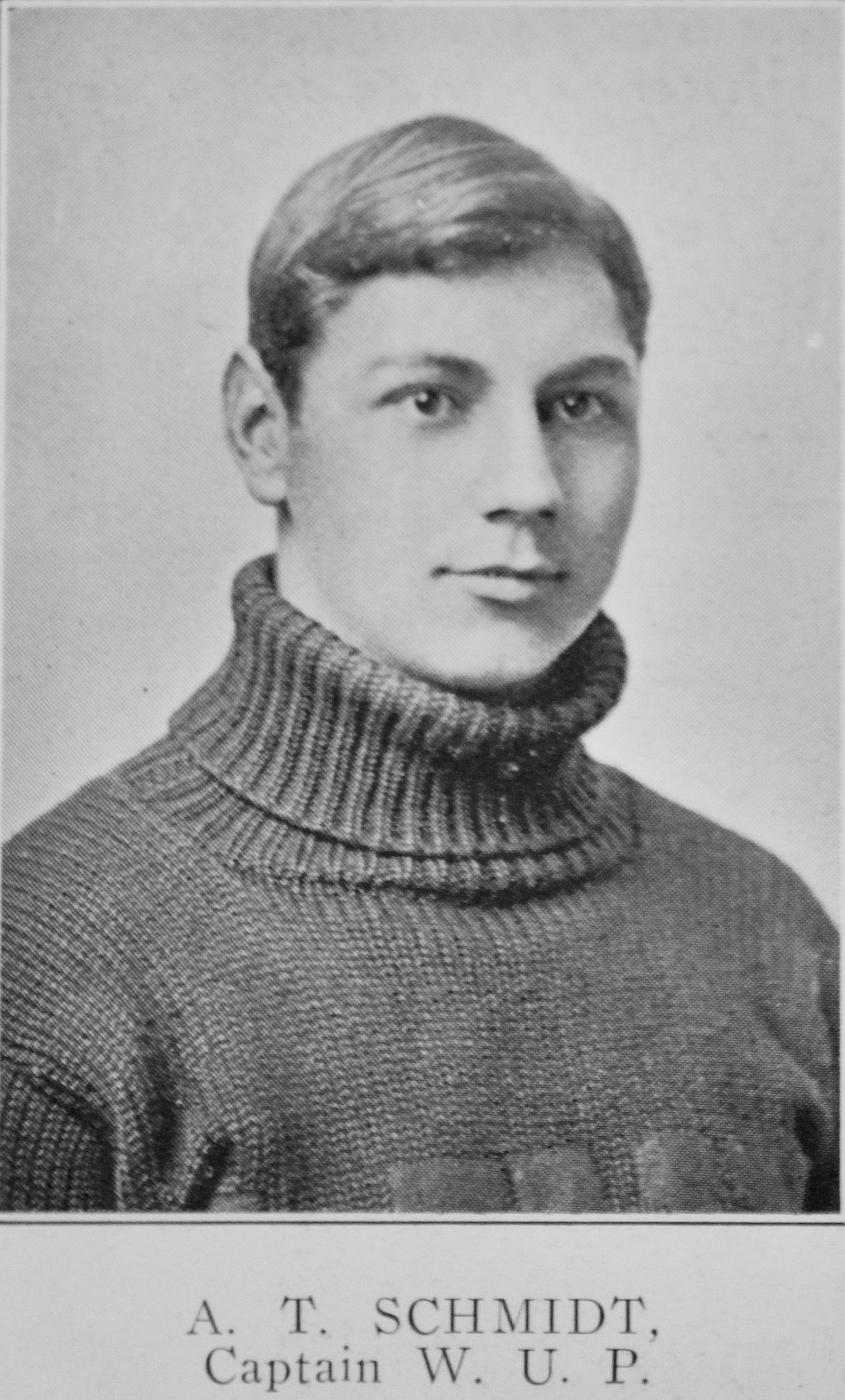
Albert "Jud" Schmidt

1905 Western University of Pennsylvania scoring summary
Player	Touchdowns	Extra points	Safety	Points
Jud Schmidt	7	28	0	63
Walter East	11	0	2	57
Winfred Banbury	10	0	0	50
Art Griggs	8	2	0	42
Quince Banbury	7	0	0	35
Plummer Capwell	4	7	0	27
Waldemar Zieg	1	9	0	26
Karl Swenson	4	0	0	20
Leslie Waddill	4	0	0	20
Omar Mehl	3	0	0	15
Joseph Thompson	3	0	0	15
Jack Turner	2	2	0	12
Theodore Perry	2	1		11
Fred Klawuhn	2	0	0	10
Charles Springer	2	0	0	10
John Mackrell	2	0	0	10
Jay Frye	2	0	0	10
Arthur Yeilding	1	0	0	5
Frank Griggs	1	0	0	5
Calvin Marshall	1	0	0	5
Joe Edgar	0	4	0	4
Curt Leidenroth	0	1	0	1
John Sullivan	0	1	0	1
Totals	77	53	1	441
