= 1905 Penn State football team =

American college football season

1905 Penn State football
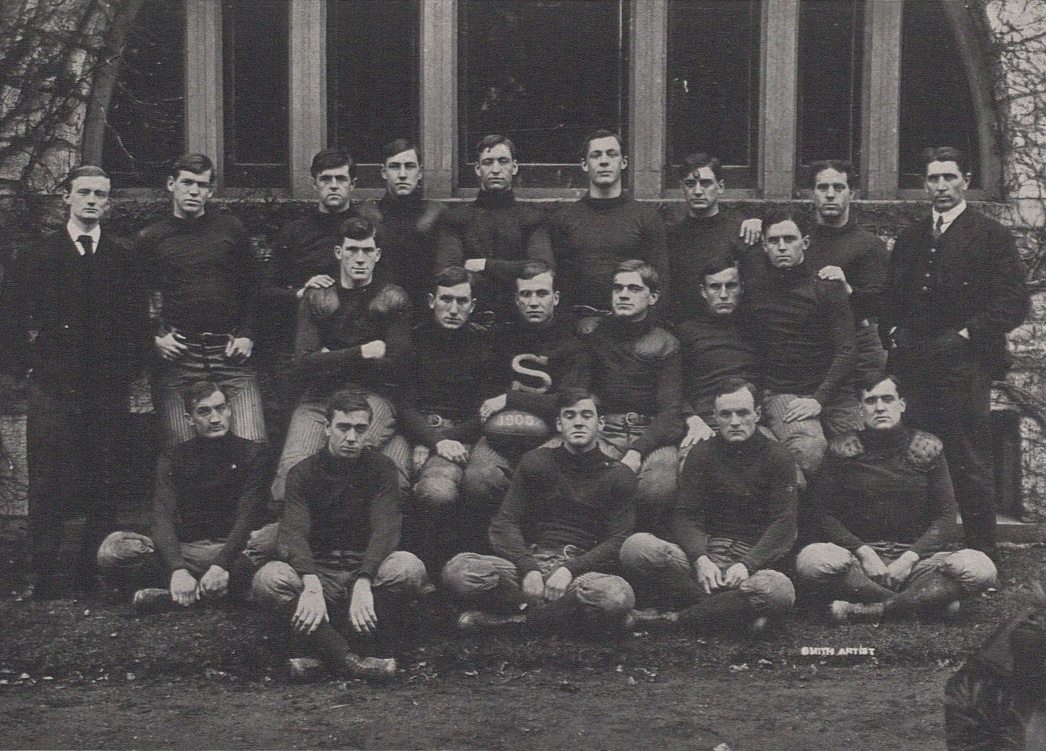
- Conference: Independent
- Record: 8–3
- Head coach: Tom Fennell (2nd season)
- Captain: Ed Yeckley
- Home stadium: Beaver Field

1905 Eastern college football independents records
	Conf.			Overall
Team	W	L	T	W		L		T
Yale		–		10	–	0	–	0
Penn		–		12	–	0	–	1
Temple		–		2	–	0	–	1
Dartmouth		–		7	–	1	–	2
Swarthmore		–		7	–	1	–	0
Western U. of Penn.		–		10	–	2	–	0
Princeton		–		8	–	2	–	0
Harvard		–		8	–	2	–	1
Washington & Jefferson		–		10	–	3	–	0
Lafayette		–		7	–	2	–	1
Wesleyan		–		7	–	2	–	1
Carlisle		–		10	–	4	–	0
Penn State		–		8	–	3	–	0
Syracuse		–		8	–	3	–	0
Fordham		–		5	–	2	–	0
Amherst		–		3	–	1	–	2
Holy Cross		–		6	–	3	–	0
Brown		–		7	–	4	–	0
Tufts		–		5	–	3	–	0
Vermont		–		6	–	4	–	1
Cornell		–		6	–	4	–	0
Colgate		–		5	–	4	–	0
Columbia		–		4	–	3	–	2
Army		–		4	–	4	–	1
Bucknell		–		5	–	5	–	0
Dickinson		–		4	–	4	–	0
NYU		–		3	–	3	–	1
Lehigh		–		6	–	7	–	0
Franklin & Marshall		–		4	–	6	–	0
Geneva		–		4	–	6	–	0
New Hampshire		–		2	–	4	–	2
Springfield Training School		–		3	–	5	–	0
Rutgers		–		3	–	6	–	0
Villanova		–		3	–	7	–	0
Drexel		–		1	–	7	–	0

The 1905 Penn State football team was an American football team that represented Pennsylvania State College—now known as Pennsylvania State University–as an independent during the 1905 college football season. The team was coached by Tom Fennell and played its home games on Beaver Field in State College, Pennsylvania.

== Schedule ==
Date	Opponent	Site	Result	Attendance	Source
September 16	Lebanon Valley	Beaver Field; State College, PA	W 23–0		
September 30	California (PA)	Beaver Field; State College, PA	W 29–0		
October 7	vs. Carlisle	Harrisburg Athletic Grounds; Harrisburg, PA	L 0–11	10,000	
October 14	at Gettysburg	Beaver Field; State College, PA	W 18–0		
October 21	at Yale	Yale Field; New Haven, CT	L 0–12	2,000	
October 28	Villanova	Beaver Field; State College, PA	W 29–0		
November 4	at Navy	Worden Field; Annapolis, MD	L 5–11		
November 11	Geneva	Beaver Field; State College, PA	W 73–0		
November 18	vs. Dickinson	Williamsport, PA	W 6–0	8,000	
November 24	West Virginia	Beaver Field; State College, PA (rivalry)	W 6–0		
November 30	at Western University of Pennsylvania	Exposition Park; Pittsburgh, PA (rivalry)	W 6–0	8,000	
