= 1905 Dartmouth football team =

American college football season

1905 Dartmouth football
- Conference: Independent
- Record: 7–1–2
- Head coach: Fred Folsom (3rd season)
- Captain: David Main

1905 Eastern college football independents records
	Conf.			Overall
Team	W	L	T	W		L		T
Yale		–		10	–	0	–	0
Penn		–		12	–	0	–	1
Temple		–		2	–	0	–	1
Dartmouth		–		7	–	1	–	2
Swarthmore		–		7	–	1	–	0
Western U. of Penn.		–		10	–	2	–	0
Princeton		–		8	–	2	–	0
Harvard		–		8	–	2	–	1
Washington & Jefferson		–		10	–	3	–	0
Lafayette		–		7	–	2	–	1
Wesleyan		–		7	–	2	–	1
Carlisle		–		10	–	4	–	0
Penn State		–		8	–	3	–	0
Syracuse		–		8	–	3	–	0
Fordham		–		5	–	2	–	0
Amherst		–		3	–	1	–	2
Holy Cross		–		6	–	3	–	0
Brown		–		7	–	4	–	0
Tufts		–		5	–	3	–	0
Vermont		–		6	–	4	–	1
Cornell		–		6	–	4	–	0
Colgate		–		5	–	4	–	0
Columbia		–		4	–	3	–	2
Army		–		4	–	4	–	1
Bucknell		–		5	–	5	–	0
Dickinson		–		4	–	4	–	0
NYU		–		3	–	3	–	1
Lehigh		–		6	–	7	–	0
Franklin & Marshall		–		4	–	6	–	0
Geneva		–		4	–	6	–	0
New Hampshire		–		2	–	4	–	2
Springfield Training School		–		3	–	5	–	0
Rutgers		–		3	–	6	–	0
Villanova		–		3	–	7	–	0
Drexel		–		1	–	7	–	0

The 1905 Dartmouth football team was an American football team that represented Dartmouth College as an independent during the 1905 college football season. In its third season under head coach Fred Folsom, the team compiled a 7–1–2 record, shut out six of ten opponents, and outscored opponents by a total of 150 to 34. David Main was the team captain. The team played its home games at Alumni Oval in Hanover, New Hampshire.

== Schedule ==
Date	Opponent	Site	Result	Source
September 27	Norwich	Alumni Oval; Hanover, NH	W 34–0	
September 30	Massachusetts	Alumni Oval; Hanover, NH	W 18–0	
October 4	Vermont	Alumni Oval; Hanover, NH	W 12–0	
October 7	Holy Cross	Alumni Oval; Hanover, NH	W 16–6	
October 14	Colgate	Alumni Oval; Hanover, NH	L 10–16	
October 21	Williams	Alumni Oval; Hanover, NH	W 24–0	
November 4	at Princeton	University Field; Princeton, NJ	W 6–0	
November 11	at Amherst	Pratt Field; Amherst, MA	T 0–0	
November 18	at Harvard	Harvard Stadium; Boston, MA (rivalry)	T 6–6	
November 25	vs. Brown	Hampden Park; Springfield, MA	W 24–6	
