= 1905 Drexel Dragons football team =

American college football season

1905 Drexel Dragons football
- Conference: Independent
- Record: 1–7
- Head coach: ? Smith
- Captain: J.H. Fenton

1905 Eastern college football independents records
	Conf.			Overall
Team	W	L	T	W		L		T
Yale		–		10	–	0	–	0
Penn		–		12	–	0	–	1
Temple		–		2	–	0	–	1
Dartmouth		–		7	–	1	–	2
Swarthmore		–		7	–	1	–	0
Western U. of Penn.		–		10	–	2	–	0
Princeton		–		8	–	2	–	0
Harvard		–		8	–	2	–	1
Washington & Jefferson		–		10	–	3	–	0
Lafayette		–		7	–	2	–	1
Wesleyan		–		7	–	2	–	1
Carlisle		–		10	–	4	–	0
Penn State		–		8	–	3	–	0
Syracuse		–		8	–	3	–	0
Fordham		–		5	–	2	–	0
Amherst		–		3	–	1	–	2
Holy Cross		–		6	–	3	–	0
Brown		–		7	–	4	–	0
Tufts		–		5	–	3	–	0
Vermont		–		6	–	4	–	1
Cornell		–		6	–	4	–	0
Colgate		–		5	–	4	–	0
Columbia		–		4	–	3	–	2
Army		–		4	–	4	–	1
Bucknell		–		5	–	5	–	0
Dickinson		–		4	–	4	–	0
NYU		–		3	–	3	–	1
Lehigh		–		6	–	7	–	0
Franklin & Marshall		–		4	–	6	–	0
Geneva		–		4	–	6	–	0
New Hampshire		–		2	–	4	–	2
Springfield Training School		–		3	–	5	–	0
Rutgers		–		3	–	6	–	0
Villanova		–		3	–	7	–	0
Drexel		–		1	–	7	–	0

The 1905 Drexel Dragons football team did not have a head coach.

Drexel earned its first win of the season against Delancey (PA).

== Schedule ==
Date	Opponent	Site	Result
October 6	William Penn Charter School		L 0–34
October 10	Central High School		L 0–17
October 14	at Bordentown Military Institute		L 0–6
October 20	at Germantown	(Cancelled due to lack of field)	C
October 27	at Radnor High School		L 0–6
November 3	Northeast Manual Training School		L 0–12
November 14	at Central Manual Training School	Columbia Ball Park; Philadelphia, PA	L 5–18
November 16	DeLancey School (PA)	Stenton Field; Philadelphia, PA	W 12–6
November 25	at National Farm School	Doylestown, PA	L 0–12
November	at South Jersey Institute	Bridgeton, NJ	

== Roster ==
1905 Drexel Dragons football team roster
Players
Coaches
Offense

Pos.	#	Name	Class
LT		Wollison
FB		Remington
HB		Storms
G		Buckingham
RT		Laird
TE		Sheppard
HB		J.H. Fenton (C)

Defense

Pos.	#	Name	Class

Special teams

Pos.	#	Name	Class

Head coach

Coordinators/assistant coaches

Legend

- (C) Team captain
- (S) Suspended
- (I) Ineligible
- Injured
- Redshirt
