= 1905 Syracuse Orangemen football team =

American college football season

1905 Syracuse Orangemen football
- Conference: Independent
- Record: 8–3
- Head coach: Charles P. Hutchins (2nd season)
- Captain: David Tucker
- Home stadium: Old Oval

1905 Eastern college football independents records
	Conf.			Overall
Team	W	L	T	W		L		T
Yale		–		10	–	0	–	0
Penn		–		12	–	0	–	1
Temple		–		2	–	0	–	1
Dartmouth		–		7	–	1	–	2
Swarthmore		–		7	–	1	–	0
Western U. of Penn.		–		10	–	2	–	0
Princeton		–		8	–	2	–	0
Harvard		–		8	–	2	–	1
Washington & Jefferson		–		10	–	3	–	0
Lafayette		–		7	–	2	–	1
Wesleyan		–		7	–	2	–	1
Carlisle		–		10	–	4	–	0
Penn State		–		8	–	3	–	0
Syracuse		–		8	–	3	–	0
Fordham		–		5	–	2	–	0
Amherst		–		3	–	1	–	2
Holy Cross		–		6	–	3	–	0
Brown		–		7	–	4	–	0
Tufts		–		5	–	3	–	0
Vermont		–		6	–	4	–	1
Cornell		–		6	–	4	–	0
Colgate		–		5	–	4	–	0
Columbia		–		4	–	3	–	2
Army		–		4	–	4	–	1
Bucknell		–		5	–	5	–	0
Dickinson		–		4	–	4	–	0
NYU		–		3	–	3	–	1
Lehigh		–		6	–	7	–	0
Franklin & Marshall		–		4	–	6	–	0
Geneva		–		4	–	6	–	0
New Hampshire		–		2	–	4	–	2
Springfield Training School		–		3	–	5	–	0
Rutgers		–		3	–	6	–	0
Villanova		–		3	–	7	–	0
Drexel		–		1	–	7	–	0

The 1905 Syracuse Orangemen football team represented Syracuse University as an independent during the 1905 college football season. The head coach was Charles P. Hutchins, coaching his second season with the Orangemen.

== Schedule ==
Date	Opponent	Site	Result	Attendance	Source
September 22	Alfred	Syracuse, NY	W 52–0	1,500	
September 27	Hobart	Syracuse, NY	W 24–0	1,200	
September 30	Rochester	Syracuse, NY	W 16–0		
October 7	at Yale	Yale Field; New Haven, CT	L 0–16		
October 14	at Hamilton	Clinton, NY	W 27–0		
October 21	Colgate	Syracuse, NY (rivalry)	W 11–5	8,000	
October 28	Lehigh	Syracuse, NY	W 17–0	3,000	
November 4	at Brown	Providence, RI	L 0–27		
November 11	at Holy Cross	Syracuse, NY	W 16–4		
November 18	RPI	Syracuse, NY	W 62–0		
November 25	at Army	The Plain; West Point, NY	L 0–17		
