= 1905 Washington & Jefferson Red and Black football team =

American college football season

1905 Washington & Jefferson Red and Black football
- Conference: Independent
- Record: 9–3
- Head coach: Frank Piekarski (1st season)

1905 Eastern college football independents records
	Conf.			Overall
Team	W	L	T	W		L		T
Yale		–		10	–	0	–	0
Penn		–		12	–	0	–	1
Temple		–		2	–	0	–	1
Dartmouth		–		7	–	1	–	2
Swarthmore		–		7	–	1	–	0
Western U. of Penn.		–		10	–	2	–	0
Princeton		–		8	–	2	–	0
Harvard		–		8	–	2	–	1
Washington & Jefferson		–		10	–	3	–	0
Lafayette		–		7	–	2	–	1
Wesleyan		–		7	–	2	–	1
Carlisle		–		10	–	4	–	0
Penn State		–		8	–	3	–	0
Syracuse		–		8	–	3	–	0
Fordham		–		5	–	2	–	0
Amherst		–		3	–	1	–	2
Holy Cross		–		6	–	3	–	0
Brown		–		7	–	4	–	0
Tufts		–		5	–	3	–	0
Vermont		–		6	–	4	–	1
Cornell		–		6	–	4	–	0
Colgate		–		5	–	4	–	0
Columbia		–		4	–	3	–	2
Army		–		4	–	4	–	1
Bucknell		–		5	–	5	–	0
Dickinson		–		4	–	4	–	0
NYU		–		3	–	3	–	1
Lehigh		–		6	–	7	–	0
Franklin & Marshall		–		4	–	6	–	0
Geneva		–		4	–	6	–	0
New Hampshire		–		2	–	4	–	2
Springfield Training School		–		3	–	5	–	0
Rutgers		–		3	–	6	–	0
Villanova		–		3	–	7	–	0
Drexel		–		1	–	7	–	0

The 1905 Washington & Jefferson Red and Black football team represented Washington & Jefferson College during the 1905 college football season. The team compiled a 9–3 record. Frank Piekarski was the team's coach.

== Schedule ==
Date	Opponent	Site	Result	Attendance	Source
September 23	Bethany (WV)	Cameron Stadium; Washington, PA	W 45–0		
September 27	Westminster (PA)	Cameron Stadium; Washington, PA	W 23–0		
September 30	at Princeton	University Field; Princeton, NJ	L 0–23		
October 7	Ohio	Cameron Stadium; Washington, PA	W 57–0		
October 11	Geneva	Cameron Stadium; Washington, PA	W 38–0		
October 14	Pittsburgh Lyceum	Cameron Stadium; Washington, PA	W 28–0	1,000	
October 21	at Allegheny	Meadville, PA	W 23–6		
October 28	vs. Georgetown	Friendship Park; Pittsburgh, PA	W 27–0		
November 4	Ohio Medical	Cameron Stadium; Washington, PA	W 18–5		
November 11	at Western University of Pennsylvania	Exposition Park; Pittsburgh, PA	L 0–11	10,000+	
November 18	at California Normal (PA)	California, PA	W 18–0		
November 25	vs. Carlisle	Exposition Park; Pittsburgh, PA	L 0–11	4,500	
November 30	Lehigh	Cameron Stadium; Washington, PA	W 24–0	2,500	
