= 1905 Lafayette football team =

American college football season

1905 Lafayette football
- Conference: Independent
- Record: 7–2–1
- Head coach: Alfred E. Bull (3rd season)
- Captain: Frank Newberry
- Home stadium: March Field

1905 Eastern college football independents records
	Conf.			Overall
Team	W	L	T	W		L		T
Yale		–		10	–	0	–	0
Penn		–		12	–	0	–	1
Temple		–		2	–	0	–	1
Dartmouth		–		7	–	1	–	2
Swarthmore		–		7	–	1	–	0
Western U. of Penn.		–		10	–	2	–	0
Princeton		–		8	–	2	–	0
Harvard		–		8	–	2	–	1
Washington & Jefferson		–		10	–	3	–	0
Lafayette		–		7	–	2	–	1
Wesleyan		–		7	–	2	–	1
Carlisle		–		10	–	4	–	0
Penn State		–		8	–	3	–	0
Syracuse		–		8	–	3	–	0
Fordham		–		5	–	2	–	0
Amherst		–		3	–	1	–	2
Holy Cross		–		6	–	3	–	0
Brown		–		7	–	4	–	0
Tufts		–		5	–	3	–	0
Vermont		–		6	–	4	–	1
Cornell		–		6	–	4	–	0
Colgate		–		5	–	4	–	0
Columbia		–		4	–	3	–	2
Army		–		4	–	4	–	1
Bucknell		–		5	–	5	–	0
Dickinson		–		4	–	4	–	0
NYU		–		3	–	3	–	1
Lehigh		–		6	–	7	–	0
Franklin & Marshall		–		4	–	6	–	0
Geneva		–		4	–	6	–	0
New Hampshire		–		2	–	4	–	2
Springfield Training School		–		3	–	5	–	0
Rutgers		–		3	–	6	–	0
Villanova		–		3	–	7	–	0
Drexel		–		1	–	7	–	0

The 1905 Lafayette football team was an American football team that represented Lafayette College as an independent during the 1905 college football season. In its third season under head coach Alfred E. Bull, the team compiled a 7–2–1 record, shut out seven opponents, and outscored all opponents by a total of 313 to 55. Frank Newberry was the team captain. The team played its home games at March Field in Easton, Pennsylvania.

== Schedule ==
Date	Opponent	Site	Result	Source
September 30	Wyoming Seminary	March Field; Easton, PA	W 23–0	
October 7	Ursinus	March Field; Easton, PA	W 18–0	
October 11	Medico-Chirurgical	March Field; Easton, PA	W 35–0	
October 14	Jefferson Medical	March Field; Easton, PA	W 48–0	
October 21	at Princeton	University Field; Princeton, NJ	L 4–22	
October 28	Lebanon Valley	March Field; Easton, PA	W 79–0	
November 4	at Penn	Franklin Field; Philadelphia, PA	T 6–6	
November 15	at Swarthmore	Whittier Field; Swarthmore, PA	L 0–27	
November 25	at Lehigh	Lehigh Field; Bethlehem, PA (rivalry)	W 53–0	
November 30	Bucknell	March Field; Easton, PA	W 47–0	
