= 1905 Lehigh Brown and White football team =

American college football season

1905 Lehigh Brown and White football
- Conference: Independent
- Record: 6–7
- Head coach: Samuel B. Newton (4th season)
- Home stadium: Lehigh Field

1905 Eastern college football independents records
	Conf.			Overall
Team	W	L	T	W		L		T
Yale		–		10	–	0	–	0
Penn		–		12	–	0	–	1
Temple		–		2	–	0	–	1
Dartmouth		–		7	–	1	–	2
Swarthmore		–		7	–	1	–	0
Western U. of Penn.		–		10	–	2	–	0
Princeton		–		8	–	2	–	0
Harvard		–		8	–	2	–	1
Washington & Jefferson		–		10	–	3	–	0
Lafayette		–		7	–	2	–	1
Wesleyan		–		7	–	2	–	1
Carlisle		–		10	–	4	–	0
Penn State		–		8	–	3	–	0
Syracuse		–		8	–	3	–	0
Fordham		–		5	–	2	–	0
Amherst		–		3	–	1	–	2
Holy Cross		–		6	–	3	–	0
Brown		–		7	–	4	–	0
Tufts		–		5	–	3	–	0
Vermont		–		6	–	4	–	1
Cornell		–		6	–	4	–	0
Colgate		–		5	–	4	–	0
Columbia		–		4	–	3	–	2
Army		–		4	–	4	–	1
Bucknell		–		5	–	5	–	0
Dickinson		–		4	–	4	–	0
NYU		–		3	–	3	–	1
Lehigh		–		6	–	7	–	0
Franklin & Marshall		–		4	–	6	–	0
Geneva		–		4	–	6	–	0
New Hampshire		–		2	–	4	–	2
Springfield Training School		–		3	–	5	–	0
Rutgers		–		3	–	6	–	0
Villanova		–		3	–	7	–	0
Drexel		–		1	–	7	–	0

The 1905 Lehigh Brown and White football team was an American football team that represented Lehigh University as an independent during the 1905 college football season. In its fourth season under head coach Samuel B. Newton, the team compiled a 6–7 record and was outscored by a total of 201 to 154. Lehigh played home games at Lehigh Field in Bethlehem, Pennsylvania.

== Schedule ==
Date	Opponent	Site	Result	Attendance	Source
September 23	Albright	Lehigh Field; Bethlehem, PA	W 29–0		
September 27	Maryland Medical College	Lehigh Field; Bethlehem, PA	Postponed		
September 30	at Penn	Franklin Field; Philadelphia, PA	L 0–35		
October 1	Gallaudet	Lehigh Field; Bethlehem, PA	W 56–0		
October 4	Medico-Chirurgical	Lehigh Field; Bethlehem, PA	W 23–0		
October 7	at NYU	Ohio Field; New York, NY	W 11–2		
October 11	at Princeton	University Field; Princeton, NJ	L 6–29		
October 14	at Haverford	Haverford, PA	W 6–5		
October 21	Franklin & Marshall	Lehigh Field; Bethlehem, PA	W 23–6		
October 28	at Syracuse	Syracuse, NY	L 0–17		
November 11	at Dickinson	Carlisle, PA	L 0–18		
November 18	at Ursinus	Collegeville, PA	L 0–12		
November 25	Lafayette	Lehigh Field; Bethlehem, PA (rivalry)	L 0–53		
November 30	at Washington & Jefferson	Washington, PA	L 0–24	2,500	
