= 1905 Wesleyan Methodists football team =

American college football season

1905 Wesleyan Methodists football
- Conference: Independent
- Record: 7–2–1
- Head coach: Howard R. Reiter (3rd season)
- Home stadium: Andrus Field

1905 Eastern college football independents records
	Conf.			Overall
Team	W	L	T	W		L		T
Yale		–		10	–	0	–	0
Penn		–		12	–	0	–	1
Temple		–		2	–	0	–	1
Dartmouth		–		7	–	1	–	2
Swarthmore		–		7	–	1	–	0
Western U. of Penn.		–		10	–	2	–	0
Princeton		–		8	–	2	–	0
Harvard		–		8	–	2	–	1
Washington & Jefferson		–		10	–	3	–	0
Lafayette		–		7	–	2	–	1
Wesleyan		–		7	–	2	–	1
Carlisle		–		10	–	4	–	0
Penn State		–		8	–	3	–	0
Syracuse		–		8	–	3	–	0
Fordham		–		5	–	2	–	0
Amherst		–		3	–	1	–	2
Holy Cross		–		6	–	3	–	0
Brown		–		7	–	4	–	0
Tufts		–		5	–	3	–	0
Vermont		–		6	–	4	–	1
Cornell		–		6	–	4	–	0
Colgate		–		5	–	4	–	0
Columbia		–		4	–	3	–	2
Army		–		4	–	4	–	1
Bucknell		–		5	–	5	–	0
Dickinson		–		4	–	4	–	0
NYU		–		3	–	3	–	1
Lehigh		–		6	–	7	–	0
Franklin & Marshall		–		4	–	6	–	0
Geneva		–		4	–	6	–	0
New Hampshire		–		2	–	4	–	2
Springfield Training School		–		3	–	5	–	0
Rutgers		–		3	–	6	–	0
Villanova		–		3	–	7	–	0
Drexel		–		1	–	7	–	0

The 1905 Wesleyan Methodists football team represented Wesleyan University during the 1905 college football season. The team was led by Howard R. Reiter and posted a 7–2–1 record, losing only to national champion Yale in the first official week of play, before losing to Swarthmore in the final week of play. The game were played at Andrus Field, the oldest continuously used American football field in the world. The team's quarterback was Hall of Famer Harry Van Surdam.

== Schedule ==
Date	Opponent	Site	Result	Attendance	Source
September 30	Connecticut	Andrus Field; Middletown, CT	W 38–0		
October 4	at Yale	Yale Field; New Haven, CT	L 0–27		
October 7	at Columbia	American League Park; New York, NY	T 0–0		
October 14	Vermont	Andrus Field; Middletown, CT	W 19–11		
October 21	at NYU	Ohio Field; Bronx, NY	W 31–0		
October 28	Union (NY)	Andrus Field; Middletown, CT	W 26–5		
November 4	Tufts	Andrus Field; Middletown, CT	W 27–5		
November 11	Williams	Andrus Field; Middletown, CT	W 18–0	3,000	
November 18	Susquehanna	Andrus Field; Middletown, CT	W 23–0		
November 25	at Swarthmore	Whittier Field; Swarthmore, PA	L 6–50		
