= 1905 Yale Bulldogs football team =

American college football season

1905 Yale Bulldogs football

National champion (Davis, Whitney)
- Conference: Independent
- Record: 10–0
- Head coach: Jack Owsley (1st season)
- Captain: Tom Shevlin
- Home stadium: Yale Field

1905 Eastern college football independents records
	Conf.			Overall
Team	W	L	T	W		L		T
Yale		–		10	–	0	–	0
Penn		–		12	–	0	–	1
Temple		–		2	–	0	–	1
Dartmouth		–		7	–	1	–	2
Swarthmore		–		7	–	1	–	0
Western U. of Penn.		–		10	–	2	–	0
Princeton		–		8	–	2	–	0
Harvard		–		8	–	2	–	1
Washington & Jefferson		–		10	–	3	–	0
Lafayette		–		7	–	2	–	1
Wesleyan		–		7	–	2	–	1
Carlisle		–		10	–	4	–	0
Penn State		–		8	–	3	–	0
Syracuse		–		8	–	3	–	0
Fordham		–		5	–	2	–	0
Amherst		–		3	–	1	–	2
Holy Cross		–		6	–	3	–	0
Brown		–		7	–	4	–	0
Tufts		–		5	–	3	–	0
Vermont		–		6	–	4	–	1
Cornell		–		6	–	4	–	0
Colgate		–		5	–	4	–	0
Columbia		–		4	–	3	–	2
Army		–		4	–	4	–	1
Bucknell		–		5	–	5	–	0
Dickinson		–		4	–	4	–	0
NYU		–		3	–	3	–	1
Lehigh		–		6	–	7	–	0
Franklin & Marshall		–		4	–	6	–	0
Geneva		–		4	–	6	–	0
New Hampshire		–		2	–	4	–	2
Springfield Training School		–		3	–	5	–	0
Rutgers		–		3	–	6	–	0
Villanova		–		3	–	7	–	0
Drexel		–		1	–	7	–	0

The 1905 Yale Bulldogs football team was an American football that represented Yale University as an independent during the 1905 college football season. The team finished with a 10–0 record, shut out nine of ten opponents, and outscored all opponents by a total of 227 to 4. Jack Owsley was the head coach, and Tom Shevlin was the team captain.

There was no contemporaneous system in 1905 for determining a national champion. However, Yale was retroactively named as the national champion by Caspar Whitney and Parke H. Davis.

Four Yale players were selected as consensus first-team players on the 1905 All-America team. The team's consensus All-Americans were: quarterback Guy Hutchinson, halfback Howard Roome, end Tom Shevlin, and guard Roswell Tripp. Other key players included halfback Samuel F. B. Morse and tackles Robert Forbes and Lucius Horatio Biglow.

== Schedule ==
Date	Opponent	Site	Result	Attendance	Source
October 4	Wesleyan	Yale Field; New Haven, CT	W 27–0		
October 7	Syracuse	Yale Field; New Haven, CT	W 16–0		
October 11	Springfield Training School	Yale Field; New Haven, CT	W 29–0		
October 14	Holy Cross	Yale Field; New Haven, CT	W 29–0	2,000	
October 21	Penn State	Yale Field; New Haven, CT	W 12–0	2,000	
October 28	at Army	The Plain; West Point, NY	W 20–0	4,000	
November 4	at Columbia	Polo Grounds; New York, NY	W 53–0		
November 11	Brown	Yale Field; New Haven, CT	W 11–0	3,000	
November 18	Princeton	Yale Field; New Haven, CT (rivalry)	W 23–4	22,000	
November 25	at Harvard	Harvard Stadium; Boston, MA (rivalry)	W 6–0	43,000	

== Roster ==
- Leon H. Andrews, G
- Roderick Beebe, E
- Lucius Horatio Biglow, T
- Boggs, G
- John M. Cates, E
- Edward C. Congdon, E
- Dynes, QB
- Arthur G. Erwin, G
- Carl S. Flanders, C
- A. Rex Flinn, FB
- Robert Forbes, T
- Gillis, G
- Hayes, E
- Clarence Hockenberger, G
- Lydig Hoyt, HB
- Guy Hutchinson, QB
- Howard Jones, QB
- Tad Jones, QB
- William F. Knox
- Lasley, E
- John Nathan Levine, FB
- Howard Linn, HB
- Donald F. MacKay, G
- Samuel Finley Brown Morse, HB
- Peyton, T
- James John Quill, FB
- Howard Roome, HB
- Tom Shevlin, FB
- Philip C. Smith, G
- John A. Stevenson, HB
- Charles B. Stuart, E
- Roswell Tripp, G
- Spencer Turner, T
- Paul Veeder, HB
- Frank E. Werneken, FB
- Edward A. G. Wylie, HB
