= 1905 Colgate football team =

American college football season

1905 Colgate football
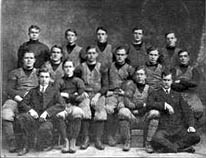
- Conference: Independent
- Record: 5–4
- Head coach: Frank "Buck" O'Neill (3rd season)
- Captain: Walter Runge
- Home stadium: Whitnall Field

1905 Eastern college football independents records
	Conf.			Overall
Team	W	L	T	W		L		T
Yale		–		10	–	0	–	0
Penn		–		12	–	0	–	1
Temple		–		2	–	0	–	1
Dartmouth		–		7	–	1	–	2
Swarthmore		–		7	–	1	–	0
Western U. of Penn.		–		10	–	2	–	0
Princeton		–		8	–	2	–	0
Harvard		–		8	–	2	–	1
Washington & Jefferson		–		10	–	3	–	0
Lafayette		–		7	–	2	–	1
Wesleyan		–		7	–	2	–	1
Carlisle		–		10	–	4	–	0
Penn State		–		8	–	3	–	0
Syracuse		–		8	–	3	–	0
Fordham		–		5	–	2	–	0
Amherst		–		3	–	1	–	2
Holy Cross		–		6	–	3	–	0
Brown		–		7	–	4	–	0
Tufts		–		5	–	3	–	0
Vermont		–		6	–	4	–	1
Cornell		–		6	–	4	–	0
Colgate		–		5	–	4	–	0
Columbia		–		4	–	3	–	2
Army		–		4	–	4	–	1
Bucknell		–		5	–	5	–	0
Dickinson		–		4	–	4	–	0
NYU		–		3	–	3	–	1
Lehigh		–		6	–	7	–	0
Frankin & Marshall		–		4	–	6	–	0
Geneva		–		4	–	6	–	0
New Hampshire		–		2	–	4	–	2
Springfield Training School		–		3	–	5	–	0
Rutgers		–		3	–	6	–	0
Villanova		–		3	–	7	–	0
Drexel		–		1	–	7	–	0

The 1905 Colgate football team was an American football team that represented Colgate University as an independent during the 1905 college football season. In its third season under head coach Buck O'Neill, the team compiled a 5–4 record. Walter Runge was the team captain. The team played its home games on Whitnall Field in Hamilton, New York.

After the 1905 season, Buck O'Neill left Colgate to become head football coach at Syracuse. He was later inducted into the College Football Hall of Fame.

== Schedule ==
Date	Opponent	Site	Result	Attendance	Source
September 23	Cortland	Whitnall Field; Hamilton, NY	W 59–0		
September 30	at Cornell	Percy Field; Ithaca, NY (rivalry)	L 11–12		
October 5	St. Lawrence	Whitnall Field; Hamilton, NY	W 50–0		
October 7	at Army	The Plain; West Point, NY	L 6–18		
October 14	at Dartmouth	Hanover, NH	W 16–10		
October 21	at Syracuse	Syracuse, NY (rivalry)	L 5–11	8,000	
November 4	Rochester	Whitnall Field; Hamilton, NY	W 53–12		
November 11	vs. Williams	Albany, NY	L 0–5		
November 18	Hamilton	Whitnall Field; Hamilton, NY	W 17–15		

The 1905 Colgate starting eleven.
