= 1905 Army Cadets football team =

American college football season

1905 Army Cadets football
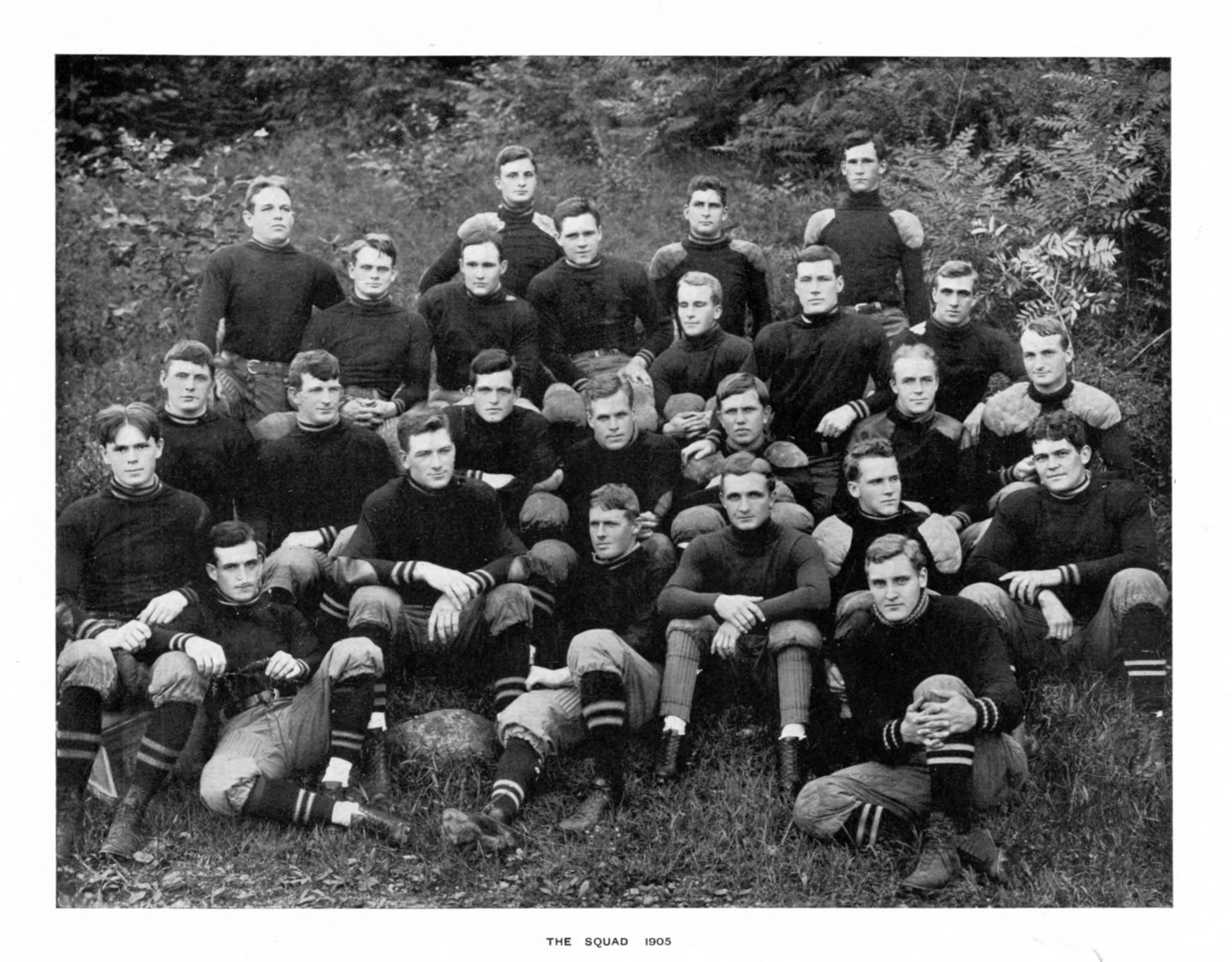
- Conference: Independent
- Record: 4–4–1
- Head coach: Robert Boyers (2nd season)
- Captain: Alexander Garfield Gillespie
- Home stadium: The Plain

1905 Eastern college football independents records
	Conf.			Overall
Team	W	L	T	W		L		T
Yale		–		10	–	0	–	0
Penn		–		12	–	0	–	1
Temple		–		2	–	0	–	1
Dartmouth		–		7	–	1	–	2
Swarthmore		–		7	–	1	–	0
Western U. of Penn.		–		10	–	2	–	0
Princeton		–		8	–	2	–	0
Harvard		–		8	–	2	–	1
Washington & Jefferson		–		10	–	3	–	0
Lafayette		–		7	–	2	–	1
Wesleyan		–		7	–	2	–	1
Carlisle		–		10	–	4	–	0
Penn State		–		8	–	3	–	0
Syracuse		–		8	–	3	–	0
Fordham		–		5	–	2	–	0
Amherst		–		3	–	1	–	2
Holy Cross		–		6	–	3	–	0
Brown		–		7	–	4	–	0
Tufts		–		5	–	3	–	0
Vermont		–		6	–	4	–	1
Cornell		–		6	–	4	–	0
Colgate		–		5	–	4	–	0
Columbia		–		4	–	3	–	2
Army		–		4	–	4	–	1
Bucknell		–		5	–	5	–	0
Dickinson		–		4	–	4	–	0
NYU		–		3	–	3	–	1
Lehigh		–		6	–	7	–	0
Franklin & Marshall		–		4	–	6	–	0
Geneva		–		4	–	6	–	0
New Hampshire		–		2	–	4	–	2
Springfield Training School		–		3	–	5	–	0
Rutgers		–		3	–	6	–	0
Villanova		–		3	–	7	–	0
Drexel		–		1	–	7	–	0

The 1905 Army Cadets football team represented the United States Military Academy as an independent during the 1905 college football season. In their second and final season under head coach Robert Boyers, the Cadets compiled a 4–4–1 record, shut out three opponents, and outscored all opponents by a combined total of 104 to 60.

Army's losses were to Virginia Tech, Harvard, Yale, and the Carlisle Indians. In the annual Army–Navy Game, the Cadets and Midshipmen tied at six. Halfback Henry Torney was honored as a consensus first-team player on the All-America team.

== Schedule ==
Date	Opponent	Site	Result	Attendance	Source
September 30	Tufts	The Plain; West Point, NY	W 18–0		
October 7	Colgate	The Plain; West Point, NY	W 18–6		
October 14	VPI	The Plain; West Point, NY	L 6–16		
October 21	Harvard	The Plain; West Point, NY	L 0–6		
October 28	Yale	The Plain; West Point, NY	L 0–20	4,000	
November 11	Carlisle	The Plain; West Point, NY	L 5–6		
November 18	Trinity (CT)	The Plain; West Point, NY	W 34–0		
November 25	Syracuse	The Plain; West Point, NY	W 17–0		
December 2	vs. Navy	University Field; Princeton, NJ (Army–Navy Game)	T 6–6		
