= 1905 Carlisle Indians football team =

American college football season

1905 Carlisle Indians football
- Conference: Independent
- Record: 10–4
- Head coach: George Washington Woodruff (1st season)
- Captain: Nicholas Bowen

1905 Eastern college football independents records
	Conf.			Overall
Team	W	L	T	W		L		T
Yale		–		10	–	0	–	0
Penn		–		12	–	0	–	1
Temple		–		2	–	0	–	1
Dartmouth		–		7	–	1	–	2
Swarthmore		–		7	–	1	–	0
Western U. of Penn.		–		10	–	2	–	0
Princeton		–		8	–	2	–	0
Harvard		–		8	–	2	–	1
Washington & Jefferson		–		10	–	3	–	0
Lafayette		–		7	–	2	–	1
Wesleyan		–		7	–	2	–	1
Carlisle		–		10	–	4	–	0
Penn State		–		8	–	3	–	0
Syracuse		–		8	–	3	–	0
Fordham		–		5	–	2	–	0
Amherst		–		3	–	1	–	2
Holy Cross		–		6	–	3	–	0
Brown		–		7	–	4	–	0
Tufts		–		5	–	3	–	0
Vermont		–		6	–	4	–	1
Cornell		–		6	–	4	–	0
Colgate		–		5	–	4	–	0
Columbia		–		4	–	3	–	2
Army		–		4	–	4	–	1
Bucknell		–		5	–	5	–	0
Dickinson		–		4	–	4	–	0
NYU		–		3	–	3	–	1
Lehigh		–		6	–	7	–	0
Franklin & Marshall		–		4	–	6	–	0
Geneva		–		4	–	6	–	0
New Hampshire		–		2	–	4	–	2
Springfield Training School		–		3	–	5	–	0
Rutgers		–		3	–	6	–	0
Villanova		–		3	–	7	–	0
Drexel		–		1	–	7	–	0

The 1905 Carlisle Indians football team represented the Carlisle Indian Industrial School as an independent during the 1905 college football season. Led by George Washington Woodruff in his first and only season as head coach, the Indians compiled a record of 10–4 and outscored opponents 354 to 44. Nicholas Bowen was the team captain.

== Schedule ==
Date	Time	Opponent	Site	Result	Attendance	Source
September 23		Pennsylvania Railroad Y.M.C.A. of Columbia	Carlisle, PA	W 71–0		
September 30		Villanova	Carlisle, PA	W 35–0		
October 4		Susquehanna	Carlisle, PA	W 47–0		
October 7		vs. Penn State	Harrisburg Athletic Grounds; Harrisburg, PA	W 11–0	10,000	
October 14		vs. Virginia	Broad Street Park; Richmond, VA	W 12–0	8,000	
October 21		vs. Dickinson	Harrisburg, PA	W 36–0		
October 28		at Penn	Franklin Field; Philadelphia, PA	L 0–6	20,000	
November 4		at Harvard	Soldiers Field; Boston, MA	L 11–23	20,000	
November 11		at Army	The Plain; West Point, NY	W 6–5	~10,000	
November 15		vs. Massillon Tigers	Case Field; Cleveland, Ohio	L 4–8		
November 18	2:30 p.m.	at Cincinnati	League Park; Cincinnati, OH	W 34–5	5,000	
November 22		at Canton Athletic Club	Canton, OH	L 0–8		
November 25		vs. Washington & Jefferson	Exposition Park; Pittsburgh, PA	W 11–0	4,500	
November 30		at Georgetown	National Park; Washington, DC	W 76–0	5,000	
