= 1905 Cornell Big Red football team =

American college football season

1905 Cornell Big Red football
- Conference: Independent
- Record: 6–4
- Head coach: Pop Warner (4th season)
- Captain: James Costello
- Home stadium: Percy Field

1905 Eastern college football independents records
	Conf.			Overall
Team	W	L	T	W		L		T
Yale		–		10	–	0	–	0
Penn		–		12	–	0	–	1
Temple		–		2	–	0	–	1
Dartmouth		–		7	–	1	–	2
Swarthmore		–		7	–	1	–	0
Western U. of Penn.		–		10	–	2	–	0
Princeton		–		8	–	2	–	0
Harvard		–		8	–	2	–	1
Washington & Jefferson		–		10	–	3	–	0
Lafayette		–		7	–	2	–	1
Wesleyan		–		7	–	2	–	1
Carlisle		–		10	–	4	–	0
Penn State		–		8	–	3	–	0
Syracuse		–		8	–	3	–	0
Fordham		–		5	–	2	–	0
Amherst		–		3	–	1	–	2
Holy Cross		–		6	–	3	–	0
Brown		–		7	–	4	–	0
Tufts		–		5	–	3	–	0
Vermont		–		6	–	4	–	1
Cornell		–		6	–	4	–	0
Colgate		–		5	–	4	–	0
Columbia		–		4	–	3	–	2
Army		–		4	–	4	–	1
Bucknell		–		5	–	5	–	0
Dickinson		–		4	–	4	–	0
NYU		–		3	–	3	–	1
Lehigh		–		6	–	7	–	0
Franklin & Marshall		–		4	–	6	–	0
Geneva		–		4	–	6	–	0
New Hampshire		–		2	–	4	–	2
Springfield Training School		–		3	–	5	–	0
Rutgers		–		3	–	6	–	0
Villanova		–		3	–	7	–	0
Drexel		–		1	–	7	–	0

The 1905 Cornell Big Red football team was an American football team that represented Cornell University during the 1905 college football season. In their fourth, non-consecutive season under head coach Pop Warner, the Big Red compiled a 6–4 record and outscored all opponents by a combined total of 173 to 59. Two Cornell players received honors on the 1905 College Football All-America Team: guard Elmer Thompson (Walter Camp, 2nd team); and George Walder (New York Globe).

== Schedule ==
Date	Opponent	Site	Result	Attendance	Source
September 27	Hamilton	Percy Field; Ithaca, NY	W 5–0		
September 30	Colgate	Percy Field; Ithaca, NY (rivalry)	W 12–11		
October 4	Hobart	Percy Field; Ithaca, NY	W 28–0		
October 7	Bucknell	Percy Field; Ithaca, NY	W 24–0		
October 21	Western University of Pennsylvania	Percy Field; Ithaca, NY	W 30–0	2,200+	
October 28	Haverford	Percy Field; Ithaca, NY	W 57–0		
November 4	Swarthmore	Percy Field; Ithaca, NY	L 0–14	30,000	
November 11	at Princeton	University Field; Princeton, NJ	L 6–16		
November 18	Columbia	Percy Field; Ithaca, NY (rivalry)	L 6–12		
November 30	at Penn	Franklin Field; Philadelphia, PA (rivalry)	L 5–6		
