= 1905 Fordham football team =

American college football season

1905 Fordham football
- Conference: Independent
- Record: 12–3–1 / 5–2
- Head coach: Eugene F. McGee (1st season)
- Captain: Howard Gargan
- Home stadium: Fordham Field, Polo Grounds

1905 Eastern college football independents records
| | Conf. | | | Overall |
| Team | W | L | T | W | | L | | T |
|---|---|---|---|---|---|---|---|---|
| Yale | | – | | 10 | – | 0 | – | 0 |
| Penn | | – | | 12 | – | 0 | – | 1 |
| Temple | | – | | 2 | – | 0 | – | 1 |
| Dartmouth | | – | | 7 | – | 1 | – | 2 |
| Swarthmore | | – | | 7 | – | 1 | – | 0 |
| Western U. of Penn. | | – | | 10 | – | 2 | – | 0 |
| Princeton | | – | | 8 | – | 2 | – | 0 |
| Harvard | | – | | 8 | – | 2 | – | 1 |
| Washington & Jefferson | | – | | 10 | – | 3 | – | 0 |
| Lafayette | | – | | 7 | – | 2 | – | 1 |
| Wesleyan | | – | | 7 | – | 2 | – | 1 |
| Carlisle | | – | | 10 | – | 4 | – | 0 |
| Penn State | | – | | 8 | – | 3 | – | 0 |
| Syracuse | | – | | 8 | – | 3 | – | 0 |
| Fordham | | – | | 5 | – | 2 | – | 0 |
| Amherst | | – | | 3 | – | 1 | – | 2 |
| Holy Cross | | – | | 6 | – | 3 | – | 0 |
| Brown | | – | | 7 | – | 4 | – | 0 |
| Tufts | | – | | 5 | – | 3 | – | 0 |
| Vermont | | – | | 6 | – | 4 | – | 1 |
| Cornell | | – | | 6 | – | 4 | – | 0 |
| Colgate | | – | | 5 | – | 4 | – | 0 |
| Columbia | | – | | 4 | – | 3 | – | 2 |
| Army | | – | | 4 | – | 4 | – | 1 |
| Bucknell | | – | | 5 | – | 5 | – | 0 |
| Dickinson | | – | | 4 | – | 4 | – | 0 |
| NYU | | – | | 3 | – | 3 | – | 1 |
| Lehigh | | – | | 6 | – | 7 | – | 0 |
| Franklin & Marshall | | – | | 4 | – | 6 | – | 0 |
| Geneva | | – | | 4 | – | 6 | – | 0 |
| New Hampshire | | – | | 2 | – | 4 | – | 2 |
| Springfield Training School | | – | | 3 | – | 5 | – | 0 |
| Rutgers | | – | | 3 | – | 6 | – | 0 |
| Villanova | | – | | 3 | – | 7 | – | 0 |
| Drexel | | – | | 1 | – | 7 | – | 0 |

The 1905 Fordham football team was an American football team that represented Fordham University as an independent during the 1905 college football season. Fordham claims a 12–3–1 record, though College Football Data Warehouse (CFDW) lists the team's record as 5–2.

Eugene F. McGee, a former Fordham tackle who graduated in 1902, was hired in September 1905 as the team's coach following the resignation of Fred Smith. Quarterback Howard Gargan was the team captain from 1905 to 1907 and took over as head coach in 1908. The team played its home games at Fordham Field in The Bronx.

== Schedule ==
The following seven games are reported in Fordham's media guide, CFDW, and contemporaneous press coverage.

| Date | Opponent | Site | Result | Source |
|---|---|---|---|---|
| October 21 | RPI | | W 5–0 | |
| November 4 | at Villanova | Philadelphia, PA | L 5–34 | |
| November 8 | University of Maryland, Baltimore | Fordham Field; Bronx, NY | W 16–0 | |
| November 11 | St. Francis (NY) | Fordham Field; Bronx, NY | W 22–0 | |
| November 18 | Delaware | Fordham Field; Bronx, NY | W 4–0 | |
| November 25 | at Rutgers | Neilson Field; New Brunswick, NJ | W 17–6 | |
| November 30 | Holy Cross | Fordham Field; Bronx, NY | L 5–27 | |

The following are additional games reported in the Fordham media guide.

| Date | Opponent | Site | Result |
|---|---|---|---|
| | Stevens | | T 0–0 |
| | Nutley Athletic Club | | W 17–6 |
| | Medico | | W 27–0 |
| | Resolute Athletic Club | | L 0–10 |
| | Betts Academy | | W 21–0 |
| | Murray Hill Athletic Club | | W 16–6 |
| | Webster Academy | | W 31–0 |
| | Middlebury | | W |
| | NYU | | W 16–6 |
