= 1905 New Hampshire football team =

American college football season

1905 New Hampshire football
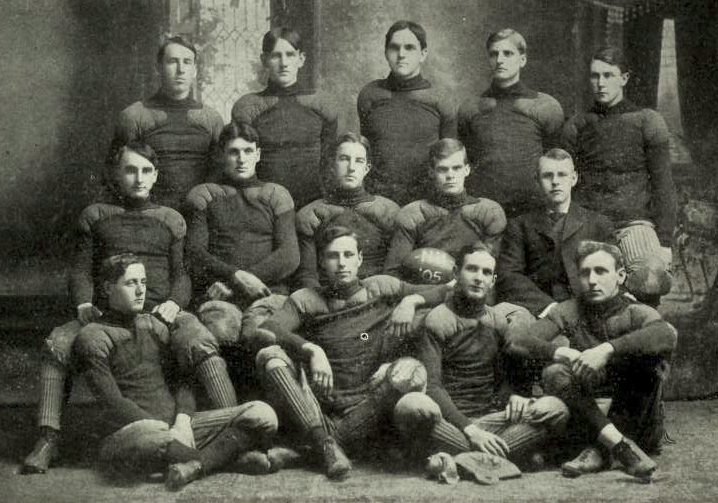
- Team captain Hardy is in the middle row, second from right, holding football
- Conference: Independent
- Record: 2–4–2
- Head coach: unknown
- Captain: Edwin D. Hardy
- Home stadium: Central Park, Dover, NH

1905 Eastern college football independents records
	Conf.			Overall
Team	W	L	T	W		L		T
Yale		–		10	–	0	–	0
Penn		–		12	–	0	–	1
Temple		–		2	–	0	–	1
Dartmouth		–		7	–	1	–	2
Swarthmore		–		7	–	1	–	0
Western U. of Penn.		–		10	–	2	–	0
Princeton		–		8	–	2	–	0
Harvard		–		8	–	2	–	1
Washington & Jefferson		–		10	–	3	–	0
Lafayette		–		7	–	2	–	1
Wesleyan		–		7	–	2	–	1
Carlisle		–		10	–	4	–	0
Penn State		–		8	–	3	–	0
Syracuse		–		8	–	3	–	0
Fordham		–		5	–	2	–	0
Amherst		–		3	–	1	–	2
Holy Cross		–		6	–	3	–	0
Brown		–		7	–	4	–	0
Tufts		–		5	–	3	–	0
Vermont		–		6	–	4	–	1
Cornell		–		6	–	4	–	0
Colgate		–		5	–	4	–	0
Columbia		–		4	–	3	–	2
Army		–		4	–	4	–	1
Bucknell		–		5	–	5	–	0
Dickinson		–		4	–	4	–	0
NYU		–		3	–	3	–	1
Lehigh		–		6	–	7	–	0
Franklin & Marshall		–		4	–	6	–	0
Geneva		–		4	–	6	–	0
New Hampshire		–		2	–	4	–	2
Springfield Training School		–		3	–	5	–	0
Rutgers		–		3	–	6	–	0
Villanova		–		3	–	7	–	0
Drexel		–		1	–	7	–	0

The 1905 New Hampshire football team (Note: The school did not adopt the Wildcats nickname until February 1926; before then, they were generally referred to as "the blue and white".) was an American football team that represented New Hampshire College of Agriculture and the Mechanic Arts (Note: The school was often referred to as New Hampshire College or New Hampshire State College in newspapers of the era.) during the 1905 college football season—the school became the University of New Hampshire in 1923. The team finished with a record of 2–4–2.

It is unclear if the team had a head coach. The New Hampshire College Monthly made several references to the team's captain and the team's student manager, but did not mention any coach. An article in The Burlington Free Press mentions "Coach Lord, who has charge of their team this year, was [the] star Yale end of 1902." This looks to be an errant (Note: Yale's list of all-time football lettermen does not include anyone with surname Lord.) and outdated reference to G. B. Ward, who coached New Hampshire's 1904 team and then began practicing law in Connecticut in 1905. New Hampshire's media guide lists Edward Herr as coach of the 1905 through 1907 teams. However, he was a student at Dartmouth College during the 1905–06 academic year, and upon his hiring to coach Vermont football for the 1908 season, it was noted that he had been coach at New Hampshire for the prior two years (1906 and 1907). Herr was first mentioned in the October 1906 edition of the College Monthly.

== Schedule ==
Scoring during this era awarded five points for a touchdown, one point for a conversion kick (extra point), and four points for a field goal. Teams played in the one-platoon system and the forward pass was not yet legal. Games were played in two halves rather than four quarters.

Date	Opponent	Site	Result	Attendance	Source
September 23	Rhode Island	Central Park; Dover, NH	W 6–0		
September 27	Bates	Central Park; Dover, NH	T 0–0		
September 30	at Brown	Andrews Field; Providence, RI	L 5–16	300	
October 7	at Tufts	Tufts Oval; Medford, MA	L 0–13		
October 14	at Massachusetts	Amherst, MA (rivalry)	L 0–15		
October 20	at Middlebury	Middlebury, VT	W 6–0		
October 21	at Vermont	Centennial Field; Burlington, VT	T 0–0		
October 28	at Maine	Orono, ME (rivalry)	L 0–16		

This was the first season that the team played a schedule where all of its opponents were other college teams; since the program started in 1893, each season's schedule had included some high school, prep school, or athletic association teams.

The September 30 game was the first meeting between the New Hampshire and Brown football programs.

The October 28 game was the fourth meeting of the New Hampshire and Maine football programs. The score is listed as 16–0 in the New Hampshire football media guide and in contemporary news reports of 1905; College Football Data Warehouse and the Maine football media guide list it as 12–0.

New Hampshire's second team (reserves) lost to Brewster Academy in Wolfeboro, New Hampshire, 15–0; lost to Lowell Textile (Note: Lowell Textile is now University of Massachusetts Lowell.) in Durham, 5–0; and lost a rematch with Brewster Academy in Durham, 15–10. On November 18, the varsity defeated a team of alumni, 12–5.

== Roster ==
The team photo consists of all 13 lettermen, plus the student team manager. The College Monthly noted that the average weight of players on the team was 156.5 pounds (71.0 kg).

Name	Position	Class	Team photo location
Arthur M. Batchelder	Quarterback	1908	Front row, far left
Willis C. Campbell	Right guard	1906	Back row, far left
John D. Clark	Team manager	1906	Middle row, far right
Charles F. Cone	Right halfback	1908	Back row, second from left
Neil S. Franklin	Left end	1906	Middle row, far left
Carl T. Fuller	Right tackle	1906	Front row, second from left
Frank H. Godfrey	Left end	1909	Back row, far right
Edwin D. Hardy	Right end	1906	Middle row, second from right
Merritt C. Huse	Left guard	1908	Back row, center
Harry E. Ingham (Note: First name given incorrectly as Henry in the College Monthly list of lettermen.)	Left tackle	1907	Back row, second from right
Cyrus F. Jenness	Guard/center	1906	Middle row, second from left
Bernard C. Noyes	Center	1907	Front row, far right
Franklin E. Stockwell	Fullback	1907	Middle row, center
Carroll B. Wilkins	Left halfback	1909	Front row, second from right
