= 1905 Harvard Crimson football team =

American college football season

1905 Harvard Crimson football
- Conference: Independent
- Record: 8–2–1
- Head coach: Bill Reid (2nd season)
- Captain: Daniel Hurley
- Home stadium: Harvard Stadium

1905 Eastern college football independents records
	Conf.			Overall
Team	W	L	T	W		L		T
Yale		–		10	–	0	–	0
Penn		–		12	–	0	–	1
Temple		–		2	–	0	–	1
Dartmouth		–		7	–	1	–	2
Swarthmore		–		7	–	1	–	0
Western U. of Penn.		–		10	–	2	–	0
Princeton		–		8	–	2	–	0
Harvard		–		8	–	2	–	1
Washington & Jefferson		–		10	–	3	–	0
Lafayette		–		7	–	2	–	1
Wesleyan		–		7	–	2	–	1
Carlisle		–		10	–	4	–	0
Penn State		–		8	–	3	–	0
Syracuse		–		8	–	3	–	0
Fordham		–		5	–	2	–	0
Amherst		–		3	–	1	–	2
Holy Cross		–		6	–	3	–	0
Brown		–		7	–	4	–	0
Tufts		–		5	–	3	–	0
Vermont		–		6	–	4	–	1
Cornell		–		6	–	4	–	0
Colgate		–		5	–	4	–	0
Columbia		–		4	–	3	–	2
Army		–		4	–	4	–	1
Bucknell		–		5	–	5	–	0
Dickinson		–		4	–	4	–	0
NYU		–		3	–	3	–	1
Lehigh		–		6	–	7	–	0
Frankin & Marshall		–		4	–	6	–	0
Geneva		–		4	–	6	–	0
New Hampshire		–		2	–	4	–	2
Springfield Training School		–		3	–	5	–	0
Rutgers		–		3	–	6	–	0
Villanova		–		3	–	7	–	0
Drexel		–		1	–	7	–	0

The 1905 Harvard Crimson football team represented Harvard University in the 1905 college football season. The Crimson finished with an 8–2–1 record under head coach Bill Reid, who had coached Harvard in 1901. Walter Camp selected two Harvard players (tackle Beaton Squires and guard Francis Burr) as first-team players on his 1905 College Football All-America Team. Caspar Whitney selected three Harvard players as first-team members of his All-America team: Burr, tackle Karl Brill and halfback Daniel Hurley.

== Schedule ==
Date	Time	Opponent	Site	Result	Attendance	Source
September 30		Williams	Harvard Stadium; Boston, MA	W 12–0		
October 3		Bowdoin	Harvard Stadium; Boston, MA	W 16–0		
October 7		Maine	Harvard Stadium; Boston, MA	W 22–0		
October 10		Bates	Harvard Stadium; Boston, MA	W 34–6		
October 14	3:00 p.m.	Springfield Training School	Harvard Stadium; Boston, MA	W 12–0	6,000	
October 21		at Army	The Plain; West Point, NY	W 6–0		
October 28		Brown	Harvard Stadium; Boston, MA	W 10–0		
November 4		Carlisle	Soldiers Field; Boston, MA	W 23–11	20,000	
November 11		at Penn	Franklin Field; Philadelphia, PA (rivalry)	L 6–12		
November 18		Dartmouth	Harvard Stadium; Boston, MA (rivalry)	T 6–6		
November 25		Yale	Harvard Stadium; Boston, MA (rivalry)	L 0–6	43,000	
