= 1905 Holy Cross football team =

American college football season

1905 Holy Cross football
- Conference: Independent
- Record: 6–3
- Head coach: Frank Cavanaugh (3rd season)
- Captain: George S.L. Connor
- Home stadium: Fitton Field

1905 Eastern college football independents records
	Conf.			Overall
Team	W	L	T	W		L		T
Yale		–		10	–	0	–	0
Penn		–		12	–	0	–	1
Temple		–		2	–	0	–	1
Dartmouth		–		7	–	1	–	2
Swarthmore		–		7	–	1	–	0
Western U. of Penn.		–		10	–	2	–	0
Princeton		–		8	–	2	–	0
Harvard		–		8	–	2	–	1
Washington & Jefferson		–		10	–	3	–	0
Lafayette		–		7	–	2	–	1
Wesleyan		–		7	–	2	–	1
Carlisle		–		10	–	4	–	0
Penn State		–		8	–	3	–	0
Syracuse		–		8	–	3	–	0
Fordham		–		5	–	2	–	0
Amherst		–		3	–	1	–	2
Holy Cross		–		6	–	3	–	0
Brown		–		7	–	4	–	0
Tufts		–		5	–	3	–	0
Vermont		–		6	–	4	–	1
Cornell		–		6	–	4	–	0
Colgate		–		5	–	4	–	0
Columbia		–		4	–	3	–	2
Army		–		4	–	4	–	1
Bucknell		–		5	–	5	–	0
Dickinson		–		4	–	4	–	0
NYU		–		3	–	3	–	1
Lehigh		–		6	–	7	–	0
Frankin & Marshall		–		4	–	6	–	0
Geneva		–		4	–	6	–	0
New Hampshire		–		2	–	4	–	2
Springfield Training School		–		3	–	5	–	0
Rutgers		–		3	–	6	–	0
Villanova		–		3	–	7	–	0
Drexel		–		1	–	7	–	0

The 1905 Holy Cross football team was an American football team that represented the College of the Holy Cross as an independent in the 1905 college football season.

In their third year under head coach Frank Cavanaugh, the team compiled a 2–5–2 record. George S.L. Connor was the team captain.

According to college records, Holy Cross played all of its home games at the newly renamed Fitton Field baseball stadium on the college campus in Worcester, Massachusetts. Contemporary reports suggest that one of the home games, the crosstown rivalry game with WPI, was played at the team's former home stadium off campus, the Worcester Oval.

== Schedule ==
Date	Opponent	Site	Result	Attendance	Source
September 23	Massachusetts	Fitton Field; Worcester, MA	W 17–0		
October 7	at Dartmouth	Alumni Oval; Hanover, NH	L 0–16		
October 14	at Yale	Yale Field; New Haven, CT	L 0–17	2,000	
October 21	Worcester Tech	Worcester Oval; Worcester, MA	W 12–6		
October 28	at Springfield Training School	Springfield, MA	W 32–0		
November 4	Amherst	Fitton Field; Worcester, MA	W 9–0	600	
November 11	at Syracuse	The Oval; Syracuse, NY	L 4–15		
November 18	Tufts	Fitton Field; Worcester, MA	W 34–0	800	
November 30	at Fordham	Fordham Field; Bronx, NY	W 27–5	1,000	
