= 1905 Villanova Wildcats football team =

American college football season

1905 Villanova Wildcats football
- Conference: Independent
- Record: 3–7
- Head coach: Fred Crolius (2nd season)
- Captain: William Moore

1905 Eastern college football independents records
	Conf.			Overall
Team	W	L	T	W		L		T
Yale		–		10	–	0	–	0
Penn		–		12	–	0	–	1
Temple		–		2	–	0	–	1
Dartmouth		–		7	–	1	–	2
Swarthmore		–		7	–	1	–	0
Western U. of Penn.		–		10	–	2	–	0
Princeton		–		8	–	2	–	0
Harvard		–		8	–	2	–	1
Washington & Jefferson		–		10	–	3	–	0
Lafayette		–		7	–	2	–	1
Wesleyan		–		7	–	2	–	1
Carlisle		–		10	–	4	–	0
Penn State		–		8	–	3	–	0
Syracuse		–		8	–	3	–	0
Fordham		–		5	–	2	–	0
Amherst		–		3	–	1	–	2
Holy Cross		–		6	–	3	–	0
Brown		–		7	–	4	–	0
Tufts		–		5	–	3	–	0
Vermont		–		6	–	4	–	1
Cornell		–		6	–	4	–	0
Colgate		–		5	–	4	–	0
Columbia		–		4	–	3	–	2
Army		–		4	–	4	–	1
Bucknell		–		5	–	5	–	0
Dickinson		–		4	–	4	–	0
NYU		–		3	–	3	–	1
Lehigh		–		6	–	7	–	0
Franklin & Marshall		–		4	–	6	–	0
Geneva		–		4	–	6	–	0
New Hampshire		–		2	–	4	–	2
Springfield Training School		–		3	–	5	–	0
Rutgers		–		3	–	6	–	0
Villanova		–		3	–	7	–	0
Drexel		–		1	–	7	–	0

The 1905 Villanova Wildcats football team represented the Villanova University during the 1905 college football season. Led by second-year head coach Fred Crolius, Villanova compiled a record of 3–7. The team's captain was William Moore.

== Schedule ==
Date	Opponent	Site	Result	Source
September 23	at Princeton	University Field; Princeton, NJ	L 0–41	
September 30	at Carlisle	Carlisle, PA	L 0–35	
October 7	at Steelton YMCA	Steelton, PA	L 0–6	
October 14	at Georgetown	Georgetown Field; Washington, DC	W 6–0	
October 21	at Pittsburgh Lyceum	Pittsburgh, PA	W 21–0	
October 28	at Penn State	Beaver Field; State College, PA	L 0–29	
November 4	vs. Fordham	Philadelphia, PA	W 34–5	
November 11	at Maryland AC	Baltimore, MD	L 0–10	
November 18	at Penn	Franklin Field; Philadelphia, PA	L 0–42	
November 25	vs. Bucknell	Harrisburg, PA	L 9–17	
