= List of Notre Dame Fighting Irish football seasons =

This is a list of Notre Dame Fighting Irish football season records. The Notre Dame Fighting Irish football team with a total of 25 National Championships, is the football team of the University of Notre Dame, Indiana, United States. The team competes as an Independent at the NCAA Football Bowl Subdivision level.

Notre Dame has the most consensus national championships and has produced more All-Americans than any other Football Bowl Subdivision school. Additionally, seven Fighting Irish football players have won the Heisman Trophy.

Notre Dame is one of only two Catholic universities that field a team in the Football Bowl Subdivision, the other being Boston College, and one of a handful of programs independent of a football conference. The team plays its home games on Notre Dame's campus at Notre Dame Stadium, also known as the "House that Rockne Built," which has a capacity of 80,795.

Notre Dame claims national championships in an additional three seasons, for a total of 11 consensus national championships. Notre Dame, however, is often credited with 13 national championships in total. The 1919 and 1964 seasons are the reason for the discrepancy: both are recognized as full championships by the NCAA but not claimed by the school.

The 1938 and 1953 seasons are also two strong unclaimed championships. In 1938, 8–1 Notre Dame was awarded the national championship by the then widely recognized Dickinson System which awarded the Knute Rockne Memorial Trophy to Notre Dame, symbolizing a national championship, while Texas Christian (which finished 11–0) was awarded the championship by the Associated Press. In the 1953 season, an undefeated Notre Dame team (9–0–1) was named national champion by every major selector except the AP and UPI (Coaches) polls, where the Irish finished second in both to 10–1 Maryland. As Notre Dame has a policy of only recognizing AP and Coaches Poll national championships post-1936, the school does not officially recognize the 1938 and 1953 national championships.

== Seasons ==
The following is a list of Notre Dame's all-time season records.

Year	Coach	Overall	Conference	Standing	Bowl/playoffs	Coaches^{#}	AP^{°}
Independent (1887–1893)
1887	No coach	0–3					
1888	No coach	1–0					
1889	No coach	1–0					
1892	No coach	1–0–1					
1893	No coach	4–1					
J.L. Morison (Independent) (1894)
1894	J.L. Morison	3–1–1					
H.G. Hadden (Independent) (1895)
1895	H.G. Hadden	3–1					
Frank E. Hering (Independent) (1896–1898)
1896	Frank E. Hering	4–3					
1897	Frank E. Hering	4–1–1					
1898	Frank E. Hering	4–2					
James McWeeney (Independent) (1899)
1899	James McWeeney	6–3–1					
Pat O'Dea (Independent) (1900–1901)
1900	Pat O'Dea	6–3–1					
1901	Pat O'Dea	8–1–1					
James Farragher (Independent) (1902–1903)
1902	James Farragher	6–2–1					
1903	James Farragher	8–0–1					
Louis Salmon (Independent) (1904)
1904	Louis Salmon	5–3					
Henry J. McGlew (Independent) (1905)
1905	Henry J. McGlew	5–4					
Thomas Barry (Independent) (1906–1907)
1906	Thomas Barry	6–1					
1907	Thomas Barry	6–0–1					
Victor M. Place (Independent) (1908)
1908	Victor M. Place	8–1					
Frank Longman (Independent) (1909–1910)
1909	Frank Longman	7–0–1					
1910	Frank Longman	4–1–1					
John L. Marks (Independent) (1911–1912)
1911	John L. Marks	6–0–2					
1912	John L. Marks	7–0					
Jesse Harper (Independent) (1913–1917)
1913	Jesse Harper	7–0					
1914	Jesse Harper	6–2					
1915	Jesse Harper	7–1					
1916	Jesse Harper	8–1					
1917	Jesse Harper	6–1–1					
Knute Rockne (Independent) (1918–1930)
1918	Knute Rockne	3–1–2					
1919	Knute Rockne	9–0					
1920	Knute Rockne	9–0					
1921	Knute Rockne	10–1					
1922	Knute Rockne	8–1–1					
1923	Knute Rockne	9–1					
1924	Knute Rockne	10–0			W Rose		
1925	Knute Rockne	7–2–1					
1926	Knute Rockne	9–1					
1927	Knute Rockne	7–1–1					
1928	Knute Rockne	5–4					
1929	Knute Rockne	9–0					
1930	Knute Rockne	10–0					
Hunk Anderson (Independent) (1931–1933)
1931	Hunk Anderson	6–2–1					
1932	Hunk Anderson	7–2					
1933	Hunk Anderson	3–5–1					
Elmer Layden (Independent) (1934–1940)
1934	Elmer Layden	6–3					
1935	Elmer Layden	7–1–1					
1936	Elmer Layden	6–2–1					8
1937	Elmer Layden	6–2–1					9
1938	Elmer Layden	8–1					5
1939	Elmer Layden	7–2					13
1940	Elmer Layden	7–2					
Frank Leahy (Independent) (1941–1943)
1941	Frank Leahy	8–0–1					3
1942	Frank Leahy	7–2–2					6
1943	Frank Leahy	9–1					1
Edward McKeever (Independent) (1944)
1944	Edward McKeever	8–2					9
Hugh Devore (Independent) (1945)
1945	Hugh Devore	7–2–1					9
Frank Leahy (Independent) (1946–1953)
1946	Frank Leahy	8–0–1					1
1947	Frank Leahy	9–0					1
1948	Frank Leahy	9–0–1					2
1949	Frank Leahy	10–0					1
1950	Frank Leahy	4–4–1					
1951	Frank Leahy	7–2–1				13	
1952	Frank Leahy	7–2–1				13	3
1953	Frank Leahy	9–0–1				2	2
Terry Brennan (Independent) (1954–1958)
1954	Terry Brennan	9–1				4	4
1955	Terry Brennan	8–2				10	9
1956	Terry Brennan	2–8					
1957	Terry Brennan	7–3				9	10
1958	Terry Brennan	6–4				14	17
Joe Kuharich (Independent) (1959–1962)
1959	Joe Kuharich	5–5				18	17
1960	Joe Kuharich	2–8					
1961	Joe Kuharich	5–5					
1962	Joe Kuharich	5–5					
Hugh Devore (Independent) (1963)
1963	Hugh Devore	2–7					
Ara Parseghian (Independent) (1964–1974)
1964	Ara Parseghian	9–1				3	3
1965	Ara Parseghian	7–2–1				8	9
1966	Ara Parseghian	9–0–1				1	1
1967	Ara Parseghian	8–2				4	5
1968	Ara Parseghian	7–2–1				8	5
1969	Ara Parseghian	8–2–1			L Cotton	9	5
1970	Ara Parseghian	10–1			W Cotton	5	2
1971	Ara Parseghian	8–2				15	13
1972	Ara Parseghian	8–3			L Orange	12	14
1973	Ara Parseghian	11–0			W Sugar	4	1
1974	Ara Parseghian	10–2			W Orange	4	6
Dan Devine (Independent) (1975–1980)
1975	Dan Devine	8–3				17	
1976	Dan Devine	9–3			W Gator	12	12
1977	Dan Devine	11–1			W Cotton	1	1
1978	Dan Devine	9–3			W Cotton	6	7
1979	Dan Devine	7–4					
1980	Dan Devine	9–2–1			L Sugar	10	9
Gerry Faust (Independent) (1981–1985)
1981	Gerry Faust	5–6					
1982	Gerry Faust	6–4–1					
1983	Gerry Faust	7–5			W Liberty		
1984	Gerry Faust	7–5			L Aloha		
1985	Gerry Faust	5–6					
Lou Holtz (Independent) (1986–1996)
1986	Lou Holtz	5–6					
1987	Lou Holtz	8–4			L Cotton		17
1988	Lou Holtz	12–0			W Fiesta	1	1
1989	Lou Holtz	12–1			W Orange	3	2
1990	Lou Holtz	9–3			L Orange	6	6
1991	Lou Holtz	10–3			W Sugar	12	13
1992	Lou Holtz	10–1–1			W Cotton^{†}	4	4
1993	Lou Holtz	11–1			W Cotton^{†}	2	2
1994	Lou Holtz	6–5–1			L Fiesta^{†}		
1995	Lou Holtz	9–3			L Orange^{†}	13	11
1996	Lou Holtz	8–3				21	19
Bob Davie (Independent) (1997–2001)
1997	Bob Davie	7–6			L Independence		
1998	Bob Davie	9–3			L Gator	22	22
1999	Bob Davie	5–7					
2000	Bob Davie	9–3			L Fiesta^{†}	16	15
2001	Bob Davie	5–6					
Tyrone Willingham (Independent) (2002–2004)
2002	Tyrone Willingham	10–3			L Gator	17	17
2003	Tyrone Willingham	5–7					
2004	Tyrone Willingham (Note: On December 1, 2004, Notre Dame defensive coordinator Kent Baer was named interim head coach after head coach Willingham was fired following the regular season. Baer coached the bowl game in Willingham's stead, a 38–21 loss to Oregon State.)	6–6			L Insight		
Charlie Weis (Independent) (2005–2009)
2005	Charlie Weis	9–3			L Fiesta^{†}	11	9
2006	Charlie Weis	10–3			L Sugar^{†}	19	17
2007	Charlie Weis	3–9					
2008	Charlie Weis	7–6			W Hawaii		
2009	Charlie Weis	6–6					
Brian Kelly (Independent) (2010–2019)
2010	Brian Kelly	8–5			W Sun		
2011	Brian Kelly	8–5			L Champs Sports		
2012	Brian Kelly	12–1 (Note: On November 22, 2016, Notre Dame was forced to vacate all 12 wins and their appearance in the 2013 BCS National Championship Game from the 2012 season, and all 9 wins from the 2013 season, including their victory in the Pinstripe Bowl. The NCAA rejected their appeal on February 13, 2018.)			L BCS NCG^{†}	3	4
2013	Brian Kelly	9–4			W Pinstripe	24	20
2014	Brian Kelly	8–5			W Music City		
2015	Brian Kelly	10–3			L Fiesta^{†}	12	11
2016	Brian Kelly	4–8					
2017	Brian Kelly	10–3			W Citrus	11	11
2018	Brian Kelly	12–1			L Cotton^{†} (CFP Semifinal)	5	5
2019	Brian Kelly	11–2			W Camping World	11	12
Brian Kelly (Atlantic Coast Conference) (2020)
2020	Brian Kelly	10–2	9–0	1st	L Rose^{†} (CFP Semifinal)	5	5
Brian Kelly (Independent) (2021)
2021	Brian Kelly (Note: On November 29, Kelly resigned to become the head coach at LSU. He finished at Notre Dame with a 12-year record of 113–40 on the field, and an official record of 92–40 due to games vacated by the National Collegiate Athletic Association (NCAA). Marcus Freeman was named the program's new head coach and led the Irish in the Fiesta Bowl.)	11–2			L Fiesta^{†}	8	8
Marcus Freeman (Independent) (2022–present)
2022	Marcus Freeman	9–4			W Gator	18	18
2023	Marcus Freeman	10–3			W Sun	14	14
2024	Marcus Freeman	14–2			W CFP First Round^{†} W Sugar^{†} (CFP Quarterfinal); W Orange^{†} (CFP Semifinal); L CFP NCG^{†}	2	2
2025	Marcus Freeman	10–2			(Note: Notre Dame was invited to the Pop-Tarts Bowl, but declined to participate in a bowl game due to not being included in the College Football Playoff.)	11	10
Total:		992–346–42					
National championship Conference title Conference division title or championship game berth
^{†}Indicates Bowl Coalition, Bowl Alliance, BCS, or CFP / New Years' Six bowl.; ^{#}Rankings from final Coaches Poll.
