= List of Dayton Flyers football seasons =

Dayton Flyers Logo

The University of Dayton first fielded a football team in 1905. They remained independent of athletic conferences for most of their history, including the period from 1977 to 1992 when they joined Division III of the NCAA. Beginning in 1993 they joined the Pioneer Football League in Division I-AA/FCS play as a founding member.

The Flyers have amassed a 718–400–25 (.639) record since 1905 and have won 2 National Championships as a member of Division III. UD has won 12 Conference Championships.

== Seasons ==
National champions †	Conference champions *	Postseason Appearance ‡	Bowl Game Berth ^

Season	Head coach	Conference Affiliation	Season results					Playoff or Bowl result	Final ranking	
Season	Head coach	Conference Affiliation	Conference finish	Division finish	Wins	Losses	Ties	Playoff or Bowl result	STATS Poll	Coaches Poll
Dayton Flyers
1905	William Schoen	Independent	—	—	0	3	0			
NCAA (1906 – 1955)
1906	Dr. J.G. Freshour	Independent	—	—	5	1	0			
1907	Dr. J.G. Freshour	Independent	—	—	0	4	0			
1908	Matthew Hill	Independent	—	—	7	0	1			
1909	George Binlein	Independent	—	—	4	3	0			
1910	Orville Smith	Independent	—	—	5	1	0			
1911	Roland Bevan	Independent	—	—	3	3	1			
1912	Roland Bevan	Independent	—	—	4	2	0			
1913	Louis Clark	Independent	—	—	4	1	1			
1914	Alfred McCray	Independent	—	—	2	2	0			
1915	Alfred McCray	Independent	—	—	3	2	0			
1916	Alfred McCray	Independent	—	—	4	3	0			
1917	Louis Clark	Independent	—	—	7	2	0			
1918	Louis Clark	Independent	—	—	1	1	0			
1919	Harry Solimano	Independent	—	—	2	2	0			
1920	Bud Talbott	Independent	—	—	2	4	0			
1921	Charley Way/Bud Talbott	Independent	—	—	1	7	1			
1922	Van F. Hill	Independent	—	—	6	3	0			
1923	Harry Baujan	Independent	—	—	4	5	0			
1924	Harry Baujan	Independent	—	—	7	3	0			
1925	Harry Baujan	Independent	—	—	7	2	0			
1926	Harry Baujan	Ohio Athletic	—	—	8	2	0			
1927	Harry Baujan	Ohio Athletic	—	—	6	3	0			
1928	Harry Baujan	Ohio Athletic	—	—	6	3	0			
1929	Harry Baujan	Ohio Athletic	—	—	4	5	0			
1930	Harry Baujan	Ohio Athletic	—	—	4	3	2			
1931	Harry Baujan	Ohio Athletic	—	—	5	3	2			
1932	Harry Baujan	Ohio Athletic	—	—	9	2	0			
1933	Harry Baujan	Ohio Athletic	—	—	7	2	1			
1934	Harry Baujan	Ohio Athletic	—	—	4	3	1			
1935	Harry Baujan	Buckeye Athletic	—	—	4	4	1			
1936	Harry Baujan	Buckeye Athletic	—	—	4	5	0			
1937	Harry Baujan	Buckeye Athletic	—	—	7	2	0			
1938	Harry Baujan	Buckeye Athletic	—	—	7	2	0			
1939	Harry Baujan	Independent	—	—	4	4	1			
1940	Harry Baujan	Independent	—	—	6	3	0			
1941	Harry Baujan	Independent	—	—	7	3	0			
1942	Harry Baujan	Independent	—	—	8	2	0			
1946	Harry Baujan	Independent	—	—	6	3	0			
1947	Joseph Gavin	Independent	—	—	6	3	0			
1948	Joseph Gavin	Independent	—	—	7	2	1			
1949	Joseph Gavin	Independent	—	—	6	3	0			
1950	Joseph Gavin	Independent	—	—	4	6	0			
1951 ^	Joseph Gavin	Independent	—	—	7	2	0	L Salad		
1952	Joseph Gavin	Independent	—	—	6	5	0			
1953	Joseph Gavin	Independent	—	—	3	5	1			
1954	Hugh Devore	Independent	—	—	5	5	0			
1955	Hugh Devore	Independent	—	—	3	6	1			
NCAA University Division (1956-1972)
1956	Bud Kerr	Independent	—	—	4	6	0			
1957	Bud Kerr	Independent	—	—	6	3	1			
1958	Bud Kerr	Independent	—	—	2	8	0			
1959	Bud Kerr	Independent	—	—	3	7	0			
1960	Stan Zajdel	Independent	—	—	1	9	0			
1961	Stan Zajdel	Independent	—	—	2	8	0			
1962	Stan Zajdel	Independent	—	—	2	8	0			
1963	Pete Ankney	Independent	—	—	1	7	2			
1964	Pete Ankney	Independent	—	—	3	7	0			
1965	John McVay	Independent	—	—	1	8	1			
1966	John McVay	Independent	—	—	8	2	0			
1967	John McVay	Independent	—	—	6	3	1			
1968	John McVay	Independent	—	—	5	5	0			
1969	John McVay	Independent	—	—	3	7	0			
1970	John McVay	Independent	—	—	5	4	1			
1971	John McVay	Independent	—	—	5	6	0			
1972	John McVay	Independent	—	—	4	6	1			
NCAA Division I (1973-1976)
1973	Ron Marciniak	Independent	—	—	5	5	1			
1974	Ron Marciniak	Independent	—	—	3	8	0			
1975	Ron Marciniak	Independent	—	—	5	6	0			
1976	Ron Marciniak	Independent	—	—	4	7	0			
NCAA Division III (1977-1992)
1977	Rick E. Carter	Independent	—	—	8	3	0			
1978‡	Rick E. Carter	Independent	—	—	9	2	1	L Division III Quarterfinals		
1979	Rick E. Carter	Independent	—	—	8	2	1			
1980†	Rick E. Carter	Independent	—	—	14	0	0	W Division III Championship		
1981‡	Mike Kelly	Independent	—	—	12	2	0	L Division III Championship		
1982	Mike Kelly	Independent	—	—	6	4	0			
1983	Mike Kelly	Independent	—	—	7	3	0			
1984‡	Mike Kelly	Independent	—	—	10	1	0	L Division III Quarterfinals		
1985	Mike Kelly	Independent	—	—	7	3	0			
1986‡	Mike Kelly	Independent	—	—	10	1	0	L Division III First Round		
1987‡	Mike Kelly	Independent	—	—	11	3	0	L Division III Championship		
1988‡	Mike Kelly	Independent	—	—	9	2	0	L Division III First Round		
1989†	Mike Kelly	Independent	—	—	13	0	0	W Division III Championship		
1990‡	Mike Kelly	Independent	—	—	11	1	0	L Division III Quarterfinals		
1991‡	Mike Kelly	Independent	—	—	13	1	0	L Division III Championship		
1992‡	Mike Kelly	Independent	—	—	10	1	0	L Division III Regionals		
NCAA Division I-AA/FCS (1993–present)
1993*	Mike Kelly	Pioneer	1st*	—	9	1	0			
1994*	Mike Kelly	Pioneer	T-1st*	—	8	2	0			
1995	Mike Kelly	Pioneer	2nd	—	9	2	0			
1996*	Mike Kelly	Pioneer	1st*	—	11	0	0			
1997*	Mike Kelly	Pioneer	1st*	—	9	1	—			
1998	Mike Kelly	Pioneer	2nd	—	6	4	—			
1999*	Mike Kelly	Pioneer	1st*	—	6	4	—			
2000*	Mike Kelly	Pioneer	T-1st*	—	8	3	—			
2001*	Mike Kelly	Pioneer	1st*	1st (North)	10	1	—	W PFL Championship		
2002*	Mike Kelly	Pioneer	1st*	1st (North)	11	1	—	W PFL Championship	Cup	
2003	Mike Kelly	Pioneer	—	3rd (North)	9	2	—			
2004	Mike Kelly	Pioneer	—	3rd (North)	7	3	—			
2005	Mike Kelly	Pioneer	—	2nd (North)	9	1	—			
2006	Mike Kelly	Pioneer	T-7th	—	4	6	—			
2007 ^*	Mike Kelly	Pioneer	T-1st*	—	11	1	—	W Gridiron Classic	Cup	
2008	Rick Chamberlin	Pioneer	T-2nd	—	9	3	—			
2009*	Rick Chamberlin	Pioneer	T-1st*	—	9	2	—			
2010*	Rick Chamberlin	Pioneer	T-1st*	—	10	1	—		25	25
2011	Rick Chamberlin	Pioneer	5th	—	6	5	—			
2012	Rick Chamberlin	Pioneer	T-4th	—	6	5	—			
2013	Rick Chamberlin	Pioneer	T-4th	—	7	4	—			
2014	Rick Chamberlin	Pioneer	T-3rd	—	8	3	—			
2015‡*	Rick Chamberlin	Pioneer	T-1st*	—	10	2	—	L FCS First Round		
2016	Rick Chamberlin	Pioneer	2nd	—	9	2	—			
2017	Rick Chamberlin	Pioneer	T-6th	—	5	6	—			
2018	Rick Chamberlin	Pioneer	T-4th	—	6	5	—			
2019	Rick Chamberlin	Pioneer	T-2nd	—	8	3	—			
2020	No team (Note: Due to COVID-19, the Pioneer Football League suspended the fall 2020 football season. Dayton opted out of the spring season.)									
2021	Rick Chamberlin	Pioneer	T-5th	—	6	4	—			
2022	Rick Chamberlin	Pioneer	3rd	—	8	3	—			
2023	Trevor Andrews	Pioneer	T–8th	—	4	7	—			
2024	Trevor Andrews	Pioneer	T–6th	—	6	5	—			
2025	Trevor Andrews	Pioneer	T–5th	—	7	4	—			
Total
Total					1	1	(.500)	(Bowl Games)		
Total					16	9	(.640)	(D-III Playoffs) 1977-1992		
Total					0	1	(.000)	(D-I FCS Playoffs) 1993-Present		
Total					718	400	25 (.639)	(all games)		

Pre-2006 data taken from

== Postseason facts ==
- Years in Postseason: 12
- DIII Post-Season Record: 16-9 (.640)
- DI Post-Season Record: 0-1 (.000)
- OVERALL PLAYOFF RECORD: 16-10 (.615)

=== Championships ===
- National Championships: 2 (1980, 1989)
- National Runner-Up: 3 (1981, 1987, 1991)
