= 1905 DePauw football team =

American college football season

1905 DePauw football
- Conference: Independent
- Record: 3–6
- Head coach: Ottmar H. Luck (1st season)

1905 Midwestern college football independents records
	Conf.			Overall
Team	W	L	T	W		L		T
Lincoln (MO)		–		3	–	0	–	0
Detroit College		–		1	–	0	–	0
Kansas		–		10	–	1	–	0
Central Michigan		–		7	–	1	–	0
Doane		–		5	–	1	–	0
Nebraska		–		9	–	2	–	0
Saint Louis		–		7	–	2	–	0
Butler		–		7	–	2	–	1
Kansas State		–		6	–	2	–	0
Northern Illinois State		–		3	–	1	–	1
Carthage		–		4	–	2	–	0
Western Illinois		–		4	–	2	–	0
Iowa State		–		6	–	3	–	0
Washington University		–		7	–	3	–	2
Wittenberg		–		7	–	4	–	0
Heidelberg		–		6	–	4	–	0
Iowa State Normal		–		5	–	3	–	2
Cincinnati		–		5	–	3	–	0
Miami (OH)		–		4	–	3	–	0
Missouri		–		5	–	4	–	0
Notre Dame		–		5	–	4	–	0
Fairmount		–		5	–	4	–	1
Haskell		–		5	–	4	–	1
Lake Forest		–		6	–	5	–	0
Wabash		–		6	–	5	–	0
Drake		–		4	–	4	–	0
Michigan State Normal		–		4	–	4	–	0
Marquette		–		3	–	4	–	0
South Dakota State		–		2	–	3	–	0
Ohio		–		2	–	5	–	2
DePauw		–		3	–	6	–	0
Mount Union		–		2	–	6	–	0
North Dakota Agricultural		–		1	–	4	–	1
Baldwin–Wallace		–		0	–	1	–	0
Chicago P&S		–		0	–	1	–	0
St. Mary's (OH)		–		0	–	3	–	0

The 1905 DePauw football team was an American football team that represented the DePauw University as an independent during the 1905 college football season. Led by first-year head coach Ottmar H. Luck, DePauw compiled a record of 3–6.

== Schedule ==
Date	Time	Opponent	Site	Result	Source
September 23		Rose Polytechnic	Greencastle, IN	L 0–5	
September 30		Indiana State Normal	Greencastle, IN	W 33–0	
October 7	3:00 p.m.	Cincinnati	Burnet Woods; Cincinnati, OH	L 0–17	
October 14		Franklin (IN)	Greencastle, IN	W 69–0	
October 21		Ohio State	Ohio Field; Columbus, OH	L 6–32	
October 27		Earlham	Greencastle, IN	W 14–5	
November 4		Notre Dame	Cartier Field; Notre Dame, IN	L 0–71	
November 18		at Butler	Washington Park; Indianapolis, IN	L 17–18	
November 25		Wabash	Crawfordsville, IN	L 0–52	
