= 1905 Cincinnati football team =

American college football season

1905 Cincinnati football
- Conference: Independent
- Record: 5–3
- Head coach: Amos Foster (2nd season)
- Captain: William Foley
- Home stadium: Burnet Woods, League Park

1905 Midwestern college football independents records
| | Conf. | | | Overall |
| Team | W | L | T | W | | L | | T |
|---|---|---|---|---|---|---|---|---|
| Lincoln (MO) | | – | | 3 | – | 0 | – | 0 |
| Detroit College | | – | | 1 | – | 0 | – | 0 |
| Kansas | | – | | 10 | – | 1 | – | 0 |
| Central Michigan | | – | | 7 | – | 1 | – | 0 |
| Doane | | – | | 5 | – | 1 | – | 0 |
| Nebraska | | – | | 9 | – | 2 | – | 0 |
| Saint Louis | | – | | 7 | – | 2 | – | 0 |
| Butler | | – | | 7 | – | 2 | – | 1 |
| Kansas State | | – | | 6 | – | 2 | – | 0 |
| Northern Illinois State | | – | | 3 | – | 1 | – | 1 |
| Carthage | | – | | 4 | – | 2 | – | 0 |
| Western Illinois | | – | | 4 | – | 2 | – | 0 |
| Iowa State | | – | | 6 | – | 3 | – | 0 |
| Washington University | | – | | 7 | – | 3 | – | 2 |
| Wittenberg | | – | | 7 | – | 4 | – | 0 |
| Heidelberg | | – | | 6 | – | 4 | – | 0 |
| Iowa State Normal | | – | | 5 | – | 3 | – | 2 |
| Cincinnati | | – | | 5 | – | 3 | – | 0 |
| Miami (OH) | | – | | 4 | – | 3 | – | 0 |
| Missouri | | – | | 5 | – | 4 | – | 0 |
| Notre Dame | | – | | 5 | – | 4 | – | 0 |
| Fairmount | | – | | 5 | – | 4 | – | 1 |
| Haskell | | – | | 5 | – | 4 | – | 1 |
| Lake Forest | | – | | 6 | – | 5 | – | 0 |
| Wabash | | – | | 6 | – | 5 | – | 0 |
| Drake | | – | | 4 | – | 4 | – | 0 |
| Michigan State Normal | | – | | 4 | – | 4 | – | 0 |
| Marquette | | – | | 3 | – | 4 | – | 0 |
| South Dakota State | | – | | 2 | – | 3 | – | 0 |
| Ohio | | – | | 2 | – | 5 | – | 2 |
| DePauw | | – | | 3 | – | 6 | – | 0 |
| Mount Union | | – | | 2 | – | 6 | – | 0 |
| North Dakota Agricultural | | – | | 1 | – | 4 | – | 1 |
| Baldwin–Wallace | | – | | 0 | – | 1 | – | 0 |
| Chicago P&S | | – | | 0 | – | 1 | – | 0 |
| St. Mary's (OH) | | – | | 0 | – | 3 | – | 0 |

The 1905 Cincinnati football team was an American football team that represented the University of Cincinnati as an independent during the 1905 college football season. Led by Amos Foster in his second and final season as head coach, Cincinnati compiled a record of 5–3. William Foley was the team captain. The team played home games at Burnet Woods and League Park in Cincinnati.

== Schedule ==
| Date | Time | Opponent | Site | Result | Attendance | Source |
|---|---|---|---|---|---|---|
| October 7 | 3:00 p.m. | DePauw | Burnet Woods; Cincinnati, OH | W 17–0 | | |
| October 14 | | Earlham | League Park; Cincinnati, OH | W 12–0 | | |
| October 21 | | Marietta | League Park; Cincinnati, OH | L 2–4 (0–6 forfeit) | | |
| October 28 | 2:30 p.m. | Spalding | Burnet Woods; Cincinnati, OH | W 5–0 | | |
| November 4 | | at Indiana | Jordan Field; Bloomington, IN | L 6–47 | 1,000 | |
| November 11 | | Ohio Wesleyan | League Park; Cincinnati, OH | W 24–0 | | |
| November 18 | 2:30 p.m. | Carlisle | League Park; Cincinnati, OH | L 5–34 | 5,000 | |
| November 30 | 2:15 p.m. | Kenyon | League Park; Cincinnati, OH | W 23–4 | 3,000 | |
