= Willis Bates =

American football and basketball coach (1880–1939)

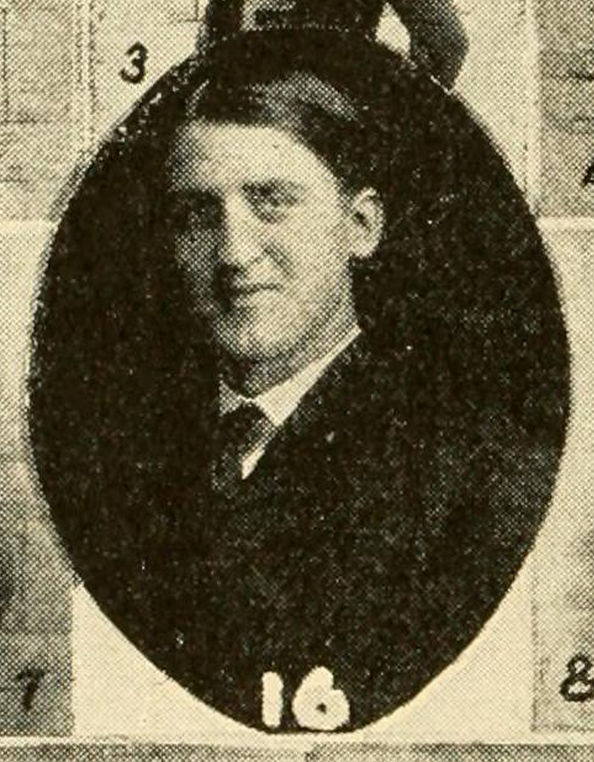
- Bates, c. 1907, at Fairmount

Biographical details
- Born: January 26, 1880; Ohio, U.S.
- Died: May 13, 1939 (aged 59); Long Beach, California, U.S.

Coaching career (HC unless noted)

Football
- 1905–1908: Fairmount
- 1909: Oklahoma Christian
- 1914–1925: Southwestern (KS)

Basketball
- 1905–1908: Fairmount
- 1913–1914: Fairmount
- 1914–1926: Southwestern (KS)

Head coaching record
- Overall: 81–49–12 (football); 179–79 (basketball)

Willis Sherman "Bill" Bates (January 26, 1880 – May 13, 1939) was an American college football and college basketball coach. He served as the head football coach at Fairmount College—now known as Wichita State University—from 1905 to 1908 and at Southwestern College in Winfield, Kansas from 1914 to 1925, compiling a career college football head coaching record of 81–49–12. He also coached basketball at Fairmount (1905–1908, 1913–1914) and Southwestern (1914–1926), tallying a career college basketball head coaching mark of 179–79.

== Coaching career ==
=== Fairmount ===
Bates was the sixth head football coach for Fairmount College, now Wichita State University, located in Wichita, Kansas and he held that position for four seasons, from 1905 until 1908. His overall coaching record at Fairmount was 28–8–3. This ranks him second at Fairmont/Wichita State in terms of total wins and third at Wichita State in terms of winning percentage.

==== Night game ====
Bates was the head coach for the 1905 Cooper vs. Fairmount football game played on October 6, 1905 at Association Field in Wichita The game was played at night under gas lamps as a demonstration by the Coleman Company and was the first night football game played west of the Mississippi River. Fairmount won by a score of 24–0.

==== Experimental game ====
Bates was the head coach for Fairmount in the 1905 Washburn vs. Fairmount football game that took place on December 25, 1905. The game was played against the Washburn Ichabods using a set of experimental rules and was officiated by then-Washburn head coach John H. Outland. The experimental rule requiring a first down be achieved in three downs rather than four was regarded as a failure and a primary reason for the game to have ended in a scoreless tie; however the rule allowing the ball to be thrown forward under certain conditions was retained in the overall recodification and revision undertaken when the National Collegiate Athletic Association was formed early the next year.

=== Southwestern ===
Bates was the sixth head football coach at Southwestern College in Winfield, Kansas, serving for 12 years, from 1914 to 1925, and compiling record of 52–36–9. He is the longest-tenured coach in Southwestern's football history having served as head coach for 102 games and was mentor for future Southwestern coach Art Kahler.

Bates also served as the head basketball coach at Southwestern for 12 seasons, from 1914 until 1926, where the Moundbuilders were considered one of the best basketball teams in the nation at the time. His basketball teams amassed a record of 164–59 (.735).

== Head coaching record ==
=== Football ===
Year	Team	Overall	Conference	Standing	Bowl/playoffs
Fairmount Wheatshockers (Independent) (1905–1908)
1905	Fairmount	5–4–1			
1906	Fairmount	7–1–2			
1907	Fairmount	8–2			
1908	Fairmount	8–1			
Fairmount:		28–8–3			
Southwestern Moundbuilders (Kansas Collegiate Athletic Conference) (1914–1925)
1914	Southwestern	3–6			
1915	Southwestern	5–4–1	3–3–1	T–6th	
1916	Southwestern	6–3	6–2	T–3rd	
1917	Southwestern	6–3	6–3	T–4th	
1918	Southwestern	3–0			
1919	Southwestern	7–3	6–3	4th	
1920	Southwestern	2–5–2	2–5–1	11th	
1921	Southwestern	5–4	4–4	T–8th	
1922	Southwestern	5–3–2	5–2–2	T–4th	
1923	Southwestern	2–5–2	1–5–2	14th	
1924	Southwestern	4–2–2	2–2–2	T–7th	
1925	Southwestern	5–3	4–3	7th	
Southwestern:		53–41–9			
Total:		81–49–12			
