= 1905 Haskell Indians football team =

American college football season

1905 Haskell Indians football
- Conference: Independent
- Record: 5–4–1
- Head coach: Boyd Hill (1st season)

1905 Midwestern college football independents records
	Conf.			Overall
Team	W	L	T	W		L		T
Lincoln (MO)		–		3	–	0	–	0
Detroit College		–		1	–	0	–	0
Kansas		–		10	–	1	–	0
Central Michigan		–		7	–	1	–	0
Doane		–		5	–	1	–	0
Nebraska		–		9	–	2	–	0
Saint Louis		–		7	–	2	–	0
Butler		–		7	–	2	–	1
Kansas State		–		6	–	2	–	0
Northern Illinois State		–		3	–	1	–	1
Carthage		–		4	–	2	–	0
Western Illinois		–		4	–	2	–	0
Iowa State		–		6	–	3	–	0
Washington University		–		7	–	3	–	2
Wittenberg		–		7	–	4	–	0
Heidelberg		–		6	–	4	–	0
Iowa State Normal		–		5	–	3	–	2
Cincinnati		–		5	–	3	–	0
Miami (OH)		–		4	–	3	–	0
Missouri		–		5	–	4	–	0
Notre Dame		–		5	–	4	–	0
Fairmount		–		5	–	4	–	1
Haskell		–		5	–	4	–	1
Lake Forest		–		6	–	5	–	0
Wabash		–		6	–	5	–	0
Drake		–		4	–	4	–	0
Michigan State Normal		–		4	–	4	–	0
Marquette		–		3	–	4	–	0
South Dakota State		–		2	–	3	–	0
Ohio		–		2	–	5	–	2
DePauw		–		3	–	6	–	0
Mount Union		–		2	–	6	–	0
North Dakota Agricultural		–		1	–	4	–	1
Baldwin–Wallace		–		0	–	1	–	0
Chicago P&S		–		0	–	1	–	0
St. Mary's (OH)		–		0	–	3	–	0

The 1905 Haskell Indians football team was an American football team that represented the Haskell Indian Institute (now known as Haskell Indian Nations University) as an independent during the 1905 college football season. In its first and only season under head coach Boyd Hill, Haskell compiled a 5–4–1 record and outscored opponents by a total of 102 to 78.

== Schedule ==
Date	Opponent	Site	Result	Source
September 30	Buckner Business College	Lawrence, KS	W 22–0	
October 6	at Hays Normal	Hays, KS	W 12–0	
October 13	at Texas	Clark Field; Austin, TX	W 18–0	
October 16	at Oklahoma	Boyd Field; Norman, Oklahoma Territory	L 12–18	
October 21	at Missouri	Rollins Field; Columbia, MO	L 0–6	
October 27	at Fairmount	Wichita, KS	W 16–0	
November 3	at Kansas State Normal	Emporia, KS	W 16–5	
November 11	at Drake	Des Moines, IA	L 6–10	
November 25	at Kansas City A.C.	Kansas City, MO	T 0–0	
November 30	vs. Colorado	Broadway Park; Denver, CO	L 0–39	
