= 1905 Iowa State Cyclones football team =

American college football season

1905 Iowa State Cyclones football
- Conference: Independent
- Record: 6–3
- Head coach: A. W. Ristine (4th season)
- Captain: Don Stoufer
- Home stadium: State Field

1905 Midwestern college football independents records
	Conf.			Overall
Team	W	L	T	W		L		T
Lincoln (MO)		–		3	–	0	–	0
Detroit College		–		1	–	0	–	0
Kansas		–		10	–	1	–	0
Central Michigan		–		7	–	1	–	0
Doane		–		5	–	1	–	0
Nebraska		–		9	–	2	–	0
Saint Louis		–		7	–	2	–	0
Butler		–		7	–	2	–	1
Kansas State		–		6	–	2	–	0
Northern Illinois State		–		3	–	1	–	1
Carthage		–		4	–	2	–	0
Western Illinois		–		4	–	2	–	0
Iowa State		–		6	–	3	–	0
Washington University		–		7	–	3	–	2
Wittenberg		–		7	–	4	–	0
Heidelberg		–		6	–	4	–	0
Iowa State Normal		–		5	–	3	–	2
Cincinnati		–		5	–	3	–	0
Miami (OH)		–		4	–	3	–	0
Missouri		–		5	–	4	–	0
Notre Dame		–		5	–	4	–	0
Fairmount		–		5	–	4	–	1
Haskell		–		5	–	4	–	1
Lake Forest		–		6	–	5	–	0
Wabash		–		6	–	5	–	0
Drake		–		4	–	4	–	0
Michigan State Normal		–		4	–	4	–	0
Marquette		–		3	–	4	–	0
South Dakota State		–		2	–	3	–	0
Ohio		–		2	–	5	–	2
DePauw		–		3	–	6	–	0
Mount Union		–		2	–	6	–	0
North Dakota Agricultural		–		1	–	4	–	1
Baldwin–Wallace		–		0	–	1	–	0
Chicago P&S		–		0	–	1	–	0
St. Mary's (OH)		–		0	–	3	–	0

The 1905 Iowa State Cyclones football team represented Iowa State College of Agricultural and Mechanic Arts (later renamed Iowa State University) as an independent during the 1905 college football season. In their fourth season under head coach A. W. Ristine, the Cyclones compiled a 6–3 record, and outscored all opponents by a combined total of 203 to 93. Preston Daniels was the team captain. Don Stoufer was the team captain.

Between 1892 and 1913, the football team played on a field that later became the site of the university's Parks Library. The field was known as State Field; when the new field opened in 1914, it became known as "New State Field".

== Schedule ==
Date	Opponent	Site	Result	Source
September 30	Coe	State Field; Ames, IA	W 29–0	
October 7	Iowa State Normal*	State Field; Ames, IA	W 28–0	
October 14	at Minnesota	Northrop Field; Minneapolis, MN	L 0–42	
October 21	Simpson	State Field; Ames, IA	W 63–0	
November 4	at Nebraska	Antelope Field; Lincoln, NE (rivalry)	L 0–21	
November 11	at Grinnell	Ward Field; Grinnell, IA	W 38–4	
November 18	Coe	State Field; Ames, IA	W 28–6	
November 24	at Iowa	Iowa Field; Iowa City, IA (rivalry)	L 0–8	
November 30	at Drake	Haskins Field; Des Moines, IA	W 17–12	
*Non-conference game
