= 1905 Saint Louis Blue and White football team =

American college football season

1905 Saint Louis Blue and White football
- Conference: Independent
- Record: 7–2
- Head coach: Tommy Dowd (1st season)
- Home stadium: Sportsman's Park

1905 Midwestern college football independents records
	Conf.			Overall
Team	W	L	T	W		L		T
Lincoln (MO)		–		3	–	0	–	0
Detroit College		–		1	–	0	–	0
Kansas		–		10	–	1	–	0
Central Michigan		–		7	–	1	–	0
Doane		–		5	–	1	–	0
Nebraska		–		9	–	2	–	0
Saint Louis		–		7	–	2	–	0
Butler		–		7	–	2	–	1
Kansas State		–		6	–	2	–	0
Northern Illinois State		–		3	–	1	–	1
Carthage		–		4	–	2	–	0
Western Illinois		–		4	–	2	–	0
Iowa State		–		6	–	3	–	0
Washington University		–		7	–	3	–	2
Wittenberg		–		7	–	4	–	0
Heidelberg		–		6	–	4	–	0
Iowa State Normal		–		5	–	3	–	2
Cincinnati		–		5	–	3	–	0
Miami (OH)		–		4	–	3	–	0
Missouri		–		5	–	4	–	0
Notre Dame		–		5	–	4	–	0
Fairmount		–		5	–	4	–	1
Haskell		–		5	–	4	–	1
Lake Forest		–		6	–	5	–	0
Wabash		–		6	–	5	–	0
Drake		–		4	–	4	–	0
Michigan State Normal		–		4	–	4	–	0
Marquette		–		3	–	4	–	0
South Dakota State		–		2	–	3	–	0
Ohio		–		2	–	5	–	2
DePauw		–		3	–	6	–	0
Mount Union		–		2	–	6	–	0
North Dakota Agricultural		–		1	–	4	–	1
Baldwin–Wallace		–		0	–	1	–	0
Chicago P&S		–		0	–	1	–	0
St. Mary's (OH)		–		0	–	3	–	0

The 1905 Saint Louis Blue and White football team was an American football team that represented Saint Louis University as an independent during the 1905 college football season. In their first and only season under head coach Tommy Dowd, the team compiled a 7–2 record and outscored opponents by a total of 267 to 43.

== Schedule ==
Date	Time	Opponent	Site	Result	Source
October 7		at Illinois College	Jacksonville, IL	W 18–0	
October 14		at Illinois	Illinois Field; Champaign, IL	L 6–12	
October 21		Alumni	Sportsman's Park; St. Louis, MO	W 20–0	
October 28	3:30 p.m.	Battery A	Sportsman's Park; St. Louis, MO	W 60–0	
November 4		Drury	Sportsman's Park; St. Louis, MO	W 17–0	
November 11		at Missouri	Rollins Field; Columbia, MO	W 17–0	
November 18		Kentucky State College	Sportsman's Park; St. Louis, MO	W 82–0	
November 25		Cape Girardeau Normal	Sportsman's Park; St. Louis, MO	W 47–0	
November 30	2:30 p.m.	Iowa	Sportsman's Park; St. Louis, MO	L 0–31	
