= 1905 Washington University football team =

American college football season

1905 Washington University football
- Conference: Independent
- Record: 7–3–2
- Head coach: Charles A. Fairweather (1st season)
- Captain: Fritz Lehman
- Home stadium: Washington University Stadium

1905 Midwestern college football independents records
	Conf.			Overall
Team	W	L	T	W		L		T
Lincoln (MO)		–		3	–	0	–	0
Detroit College		–		1	–	0	–	0
Kansas		–		10	–	1	–	0
Central Michigan		–		7	–	1	–	0
Doane		–		5	–	1	–	0
Nebraska		–		9	–	2	–	0
Saint Louis		–		7	–	2	–	0
Butler		–		7	–	2	–	1
Kansas State		–		6	–	2	–	0
Northern Illinois State		–		3	–	1	–	1
Carthage		–		4	–	2	–	0
Western Illinois		–		4	–	2	–	0
Iowa State		–		6	–	3	–	0
Washington University		–		7	–	3	–	2
Wittenberg		–		7	–	4	–	0
Heidelberg		–		6	–	4	–	0
Iowa State Normal		–		5	–	3	–	2
Cincinnati		–		5	–	3	–	0
Miami (OH)		–		4	–	3	–	0
Missouri		–		5	–	4	–	0
Notre Dame		–		5	–	4	–	0
Fairmount		–		5	–	4	–	1
Haskell		–		5	–	4	–	1
Lake Forest		–		6	–	5	–	0
Wabash		–		6	–	5	–	0
Drake		–		4	–	4	–	0
Michigan State Normal		–		4	–	4	–	0
Marquette		–		3	–	4	–	0
South Dakota State		–		2	–	3	–	0
Ohio		–		2	–	5	–	2
DePauw		–		3	–	6	–	0
Mount Union		–		2	–	6	–	0
North Dakota Agricultural		–		1	–	4	–	1
Baldwin–Wallace		–		0	–	1	–	0
Chicago P&S		–		0	–	1	–	0
St. Mary's (OH)		–		0	–	3	–	0

The 1905 Washington University football team represented Washington University in St. Louis as an independent during the 1905 college football season. In its first and only season under head coach Charles A. Fairweather, the team compiled a 7–3–2 record and outscored opponents by a total of 175 to 88. The team played its home games at Washington University Stadium, which opened in 1904 as World's Fair Stadium and is now known as Francis Olympic Field.

== Schedule ==
Date	Time	Opponent	Site	Result	Source
September 30	3:00 p.m.	Battery A	Washington University Stadium; St. Louis, MO	W 16–0	
October 4		Westminster (MO)	Washington University Stadium; St. Louis, MO	W 59–0	
October 7		Rose Polytechnic	Washington University Stadium; St. Louis, MO	T 0–0	
October 11	3:00 p.m.	St. Charles Military College	Washington University Stadium; St. Louis, MO	T 0–0	
October 14	3:00 p.m.	Arkansas	Washington University Stadium; St. Louis, MO	W 6–0	
October 21		at Indiana	Jordan Field; Bloomington, IN	L 0–39	
October 28	3:30 p.m.	Illinois College	Washington University Stadium; St. Louis, MO	W 35–0	
November 4		at Kansas	McCook Field; Lawrence, KS	L 0–21	
November 11	3:00 p.m.	Drury	Washington University Stadium; St. Louis, MO	L 5–6	
November 18		Missouri	Washington University Stadium; St. Louis, MO	W 14–10	
November 25		Missouri Mines	Washington University Stadium; St. Louis, MO	W 23–6	
November 30	2:30 p.m.	Knox (IL)	Washington University Stadium; St. Louis, MO	W 17–6	
