= Notre Dame Fighting Irish football under Tyrone Willingham =

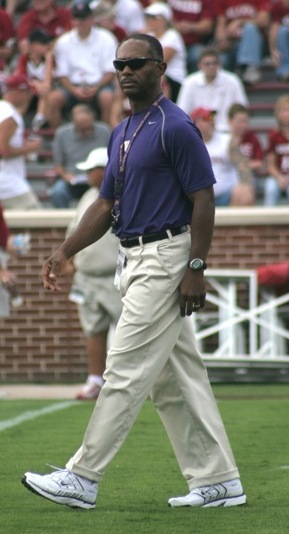
Willingham in September 2006

The Notre Dame Fighting Irish were led by Tyrone Willingham and represented the University of Notre Dame in NCAA Division I college football from 2002 to 2004. The team was an independent and played their home games in Notre Dame Stadium. Throughout the three seasons, the Irish were 21–16 (21–15 before Willingham was fired) and were invited to two bowl games, both of which they lost.

After the 2001 season, fifth-year head coach Bob Davie was fired. His immediate replacement, George O'Leary, was forced to resign under some controversy for discrepancies on his resume, and Willingham was chosen to replace him. Willingham made immediate changes to the program and won his first eight games. Although his team floundered at the end of the season and lost their bowl game, he led the team to 10 wins and was named "Coach of the Year" by two different publications. His second year began with the signing of a top-5 recruiting class to replace a number of players who graduated. Although the team began the season with a win, they lost their next two games, and freshman quarterback Brady Quinn became the starter. Quinn led the Irish to four more wins that season, and the team finished a 5–7 record.

Willingham's third season started with a loss, but three straight wins brought the team back into national prominence. The team went on to win six games, but their fifth loss of the season, a blowout to the University of Southern California (USC) Trojans, was Willingham's final game at Notre Dame. Although the Irish were invited to a bowl game at the end of the season, Willingham was fired. The eventual hiring of Charlie Weis as Willingham's replacement was called a good move, but Willingham's firing remained a controversial subject for years following his tenure.

== Before Willingham ==
In the 2001 season, the Fighting Irish, led by fifth-year head coach Bob Davie, had a record of five wins and six losses. A day after the season ended, athletic director Kevin White announced to the media that Davie would not be retained as head coach of Notre Dame. A week after the firing of Davie, George O'Leary, seven-year head coach of Georgia Tech, was hired by Notre Dame for the head coaching position. Despite being a controversial choice criticized by some in the media, and Notre Dame being criticized for making a premature decision, O'Leary was happy to accept what was called his dream job. Five days after being hired, however, O'Leary resigned from the position. It was later revealed that O'Leary had lied on his résumé about receiving a varsity letter and a master's degree while in school. While O'Leary was criticized for lying, some in the media said that his resignation gave Notre Dame a chance to make a better decision. Two weeks after O'Leary resigned, Notre Dame signed Tyrone Willingham, the seventh-year coach of Stanford, to a six-year contract. Willingham became the school's first African American head coach in any sport. He immediately made changes to the Irish program, including changing the long used Irish offense from an option attack to a West Coast type. He also made his first-year Fighting Irish team only the second in Notre Dame history to pick captains on a game-by-game basis.

== 2002 season ==
=== Season overview ===
The 2002 season became known as a "Return to Glory" for the Irish. This phrase appeared on a student shirt that created a "Sea of Green" in the Irish stands. It was picked up by many in the media and was used on the front cover of Sports Illustrated. Despite not scoring an offensive touchdown in their first two games, the Irish won both, and in the process made Willingham the 24th Notre Dame head coach to win his opener in his first season. The team went on to win its next six games, including wins over Willingham's alma mater, Michigan State, and Stanford, his former team.

The team was initially led throughout the season by quarterback Carlyle Holiday, former quarterback and wide receiver Arnaz Battle, and on defense, Shane Walton. Running back Ryan Grant, who had to replace Julius Jones who was out for academic reasons, also played an important role. During the Michigan State game, however, Holiday was injured and replaced by backup Pat Dillingham. Dillingham led the Irish to a comeback win on a screen pass to Battle in that game, and he continued the winning streak until Holiday returned for the Florida State game. In that game, Holiday he threw a 65-yard touchdown on his first play to Battle that helped the Irish win the game.

The first Irish loss of the season came against the Boston College Eagles, mirroring the 1993 season when Notre Dame narrowly lost a chance to participate in the national championship game due to a loss to Boston College. Willingham, wanting the team to be a part of the "Sea of Green" in the stands, decided that the team should wear green for the game. In 1985, the last time the Irish wore green at home, they came out after halftime against USC and won the game 37–3. The ploy, however, did not work this time, as, after an injured Holiday was replaced by Dillingham, and the Eagles defense returned an interception that sealed the loss for the Irish.

The Fighting Irish won their next two games, including their 39th straight victory over Navy and a 42–0 blowout victory over struggling Rutgers. This gave Notre Dame a legitimate shot at a Bowl Championship Series (BCS) bowl game if they could win against perennial rival USC. The Irish were ranked higher than the Trojans, but USC quarterback Carson Palmer, who cited the game as the reason he went on to win the Heisman Trophy, threw for 425 yards in the Trojans' 31 point win. The Irish won 10 games but were not invited to a BCS bowl game, and they accepted a bid to play North Carolina State in the Gator Bowl instead. With both an offense and defense that outmatched the Irish, the Wolfpack won the game 28–6, giving the Irish their sixth consecutive bowl loss. Despite the loss, the Irish ended the season ranked in both the Associated Press (AP) and Coaches Polls.

After the season, some Irish were honored with post-season awards. Battle was named by one foundation as their sportsman of the year, while Walton was named as a Consensus All-American. Finally, Willingham was honored with two Coach of the Year awards, was named by Sporting News as "Sportsman of the Year", and was the only coach listed by Sporting News as one of their "Most Powerful People in Sports".

== 2003 season ==
=== Season overview ===
The 2003 season began with the Irish losing a number of key players to graduation, including Arnaz Battle and center Jeff Faine. They were boosted, however, by the return of running back, Julius Jones, who was reinstated to the team after a year of academic ineligibility. In Willingham's first full year of recruiting, he signed a top-5 class. Of the 20 recruits signed, 12 were four-star recruits (high school recruits are rated on a star scale, with one star indicating a low-quality recruit and five stars indicating the highest-quality recruit). These new recruits included future stars Victor Abiamiri, Chinedum Ndukwe, Brady Quinn, Jeff Samardzija, and Tom Zbikowski.

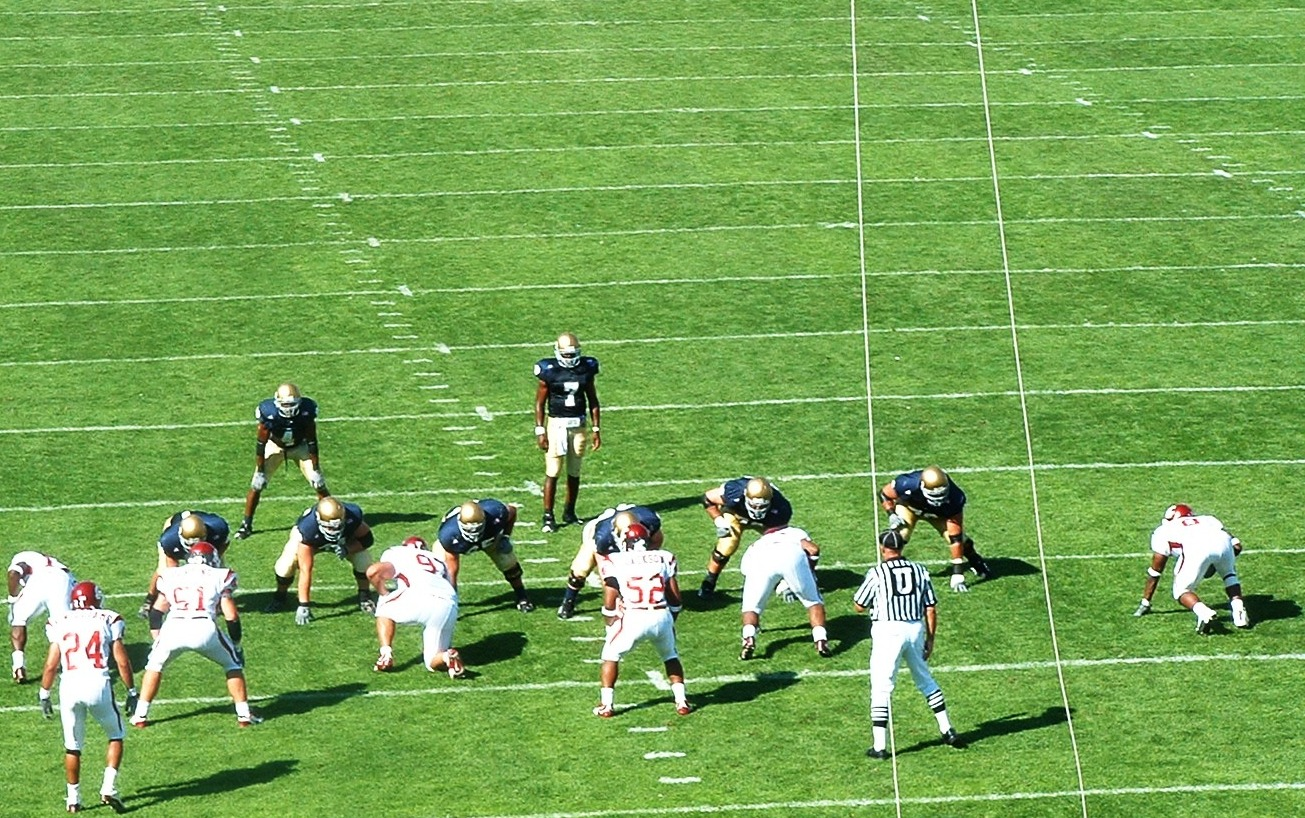
Carlyle Holiday and Ryan Grant in the back field versus Washington State

The Irish began their season ranked 19th and facing the hardest schedule in the nation. They opened against the Washington State Cougars, playing the team for the first time in the history of the program. The Irish came back from being down by 19 points to win in overtime, but Carlyle Holiday struggled as quarterback. In the next game against rival Michigan, the Wolverines avenged their 2002 loss by beating the Irish by a score of 38–0 in the first shutout in the series in 100 years and the largest margin of victory ever between the two teams. After another loss to Michigan State, many Irish fans were calling for Holiday to be taken out of the game in favor of freshman Brady Quinn, who saw his first collegiate action in the fourth quarter of the Michigan rout. Holiday was replaced as starter for the next game against Purdue.

In Quinn's first start, the Irish were bolstered with Quinn's 297 passing yards on 59 attempts. However, Purdue's defense intercepted four of Quinn's passes and sacked him five times en route to a 23–10 Boilermaker victory. Quinn remained as the starter and, with Willingham's acknowledgment that the running game needed to take more of a role in the next game, got his first win against Pittsburgh. He was helped by Julius Jones' school-record 262 rushing yards. Notre Dame lost their next three games, including Willingham's second straight 31 point loss to USC, a last minute loss to Boston College, and their first home shutout since 1978 to Florida State. The Irish players began to call the season disappointing, as the team needed to win their last four games to make a bowl game. They looked to have a chance of becoming bowl eligible, as their next three games were a last minute win that improved their streak to 40 games over Navy, a win on senior day over the Brigham Young University (BYU) Cougars, and a win over Stanford that saw the Irish offense finally connect in the season. Notre Dame lost their final game to Syracuse, however. With a 5–7 record, the Irish finished with the twelfth losing season in the history of the Notre Dame football program.

== 2004 season ==
=== Season overview ===
The 2004 season began with doubts and criticism for the Irish. With Julius Jones graduating as fourth-leading rusher in Notre Dame history, the Irish hoped to replace him with a talented recruiting class. However, Willingham struggled in his second full year of recruiting and the new class was ranked 30th in the nation. Despite signing highly sought after recruit Darius Walker, the 17 man class only included three four-star recruits.

The season began poorly for the Irish with a loss at BYU. Despite Brady Quinn improving at the quarterback position and completing over 50 percent of his passes for 265 yards, the Irish only managed to gain 11 yards rushing. They next faced a highly ranked Michigan team at home and Willingham stated that an improved running game would be important if the Irish were to be able to beat the Wolverines. Darius Walker answered Willingham in his first collegiate game, gaining 115 yards and scoring two late touchdowns to lead the Irish in the upset. The Irish were rejuvenated with this win, and they rallied to move to 3–1 on the season with wins over Michigan State and Washington. Some in the media began comparing Willingham to some of Notre Dame's legendary coaches and said the team would win seven or eight games in the season and be back in national championship contention by 2005.

With renewed expectations, the Irish hoped to continue their streak and beat 15th ranked Purdue, who had not won at Notre Dame in 30 years. The Boilermakers' quarterback, Kyle Orton, outplayed the Irish defense, handing them a 25-point loss to end the rally. The Irish got back on track and beat Stanford, making Notre Dame the second school to reach 800 wins. They also beat Navy for the 41st straight time, which moved Notre Dame into the rankings for the first time since their 2003 loss to Michigan.

The Irish did not stay ranked for long, as Boston College once again beat the Irish on a late score. The Irish had three games left and needed one win to become bowl eligible, their next game was against the 9th ranked Tennessee Volunteers in Knoxville. The Irish defense stepped up and, after knocking out quarterback Erik Ainge on a sack, returned an interception for a touchdown to upset the Volunteers and become bowl eligible. Once again ranked, the Irish returned home for their final home game against Pittsburgh. Losing on a late score, the team allowed five passing touchdowns by an opponent for the first time ever at home. Visiting USC for the final regular season game, the Irish again lost to the Trojans by 31 points. The Irish accepted a bowl bid to play in the Insight Bowl. In a highly criticized move, Willingham was fired two days later. Defensive coordinator Kent Baer led the Irish, hoping to "win one for Ty." However, the Oregon State Beavers, led by four touchdown passes from Derek Anderson, beat the Irish in Notre Dame's seventh consecutive bowl loss. The Irish ended 2004 with a 6–6 record and in need of a coach.

== Aftermath of the Willingham firing ==
In firing Willingham, the Notre Dame athletic department cited a relatively poor record of 21–15, a weak recruiting class, and three losses, each by 31 points, to rival USC. However, the Irish also hoped to entice Urban Meyer, the head coach of the Utah Utes, to lead Notre Dame. Meyer had just led the Utes to an undefeated season and he had a clause in his contract that stated he could leave Utah without a penalty to coach for the Irish. When Meyer instead took the head coaching position at Florida, the Irish were ridiculed in the media with claims that the Notre Dame coaching position was no longer as prestigious as it was in the past. After over a week without a coach, the Irish hired New England Patriots' offensive coordinator Charlie Weis as head coach. Weis was an alumnus of Notre Dame, and he became the first alumnus to coach the team since 1963. At least one sports writer stated that Weis was a choice that made sense for the program. Willingham, meanwhile, accepted a position as head coach of the University of Washington Huskies football team.

== See also ==
- Notre Dame Fighting Irish football under Bob Davie
- Notre Dame football yearly totals
