= 1905 Northern Illinois State Normal football team =

American college football season

1905 Northern Illinois State Normal football
- Conference: Independent
- Record: 3–1–1
- Head coach: Harry Sauthoff (1st season)
- Home stadium: Glidden Field

1905 Midwestern college football independents records
	Conf.			Overall
Team	W	L	T	W		L		T
Lincoln (MO)		–		3	–	0	–	0
Detroit College		–		1	–	0	–	0
Kansas		–		10	–	1	–	0
Central Michigan		–		7	–	1	–	0
Doane		–		5	–	1	–	0
Nebraska		–		9	–	2	–	0
Saint Louis		–		7	–	2	–	0
Butler		–		7	–	2	–	1
Kansas State		–		6	–	2	–	0
Northern Illinois State		–		3	–	1	–	1
Carthage		–		4	–	2	–	0
Western Illinois		–		4	–	2	–	0
Iowa State		–		6	–	3	–	0
Washington University		–		7	–	3	–	2
Wittenberg		–		7	–	4	–	0
Heidelberg		–		6	–	4	–	0
Iowa State Normal		–		5	–	3	–	2
Cincinnati		–		5	–	3	–	0
Miami (OH)		–		4	–	3	–	0
Missouri		–		5	–	4	–	0
Notre Dame		–		5	–	4	–	0
Fairmount		–		5	–	4	–	1
Haskell		–		5	–	4	–	1
Lake Forest		–		6	–	5	–	0
Wabash		–		6	–	5	–	0
Drake		–		4	–	4	–	0
Michigan State Normal		–		4	–	4	–	0
Marquette		–		3	–	4	–	0
South Dakota State		–		2	–	3	–	0
Ohio		–		2	–	5	–	2
DePauw		–		3	–	6	–	0
Mount Union		–		2	–	6	–	0
North Dakota Agricultural		–		1	–	4	–	1
Baldwin–Wallace		–		0	–	1	–	0
Chicago P&S		–		0	–	1	–	0
St. Mary's (OH)		–		0	–	3	–	0

The 1905 Northern Illinois State Normal football team represented Northern Illinois State Normal College as an independent in the 1905 college football season. They were led by first-year head coach Harry Sauthoff and played their home games at Glidden Field, located on the east end of campus. The team finished the season with a 3–1–1 record.

== Schedule ==
Date	Opponent	Site	Result	Source
October 7	Alumni	Glidden Field; DeKalb, IL	W 5–0	
October 14	Sterling Business College	Glidden Field; DeKalb, IL	W 15–0	
October 28	at Platteville Normal	Platteville, WI	L 0–12	
November 4	at Plano High School	Plano, IL	W 5–0	
November 18	DeKalb High School	Glidden Field; DeKalb, IL	T 0–0	
