= 1905 Drake Bulldogs football team =

American college football season

1905 Drake Bulldogs football
- Conference: Independent
- Record: 4–4
- Head coach: Willie Heston (1st season)
- Home stadium: Haskins Field

1905 Midwestern college football independents records
	Conf.			Overall
Team	W	L	T	W		L		T
Lincoln (MO)		–		3	–	0	–	0
Detroit College		–		1	–	0	–	0
Kansas		–		10	–	1	–	0
Central Michigan		–		7	–	1	–	0
Doane		–		5	–	1	–	0
Nebraska		–		9	–	2	–	0
Saint Louis		–		7	–	2	–	0
Butler		–		7	–	2	–	1
Kansas State		–		6	–	2	–	0
Northern Illinois State		–		3	–	1	–	1
Carthage		–		4	–	2	–	0
Western Illinois		–		4	–	2	–	0
Iowa State		–		6	–	3	–	0
Washington University		–		7	–	3	–	2
Wittenberg		–		7	–	4	–	0
Heidelberg		–		6	–	4	–	0
Iowa State Normal		–		5	–	3	–	2
Cincinnati		–		5	–	3	–	0
Miami (OH)		–		4	–	3	–	0
Missouri		–		5	–	4	–	0
Notre Dame		–		5	–	4	–	0
Fairmount		–		5	–	4	–	1
Haskell		–		5	–	4	–	1
Lake Forest		–		6	–	5	–	0
Wabash		–		6	–	5	–	0
Drake		–		4	–	4	–	0
Michigan State Normal		–		4	–	4	–	0
Marquette		–		3	–	4	–	0
South Dakota State		–		2	–	3	–	0
Ohio		–		2	–	5	–	2
DePauw		–		3	–	6	–	0
Mount Union		–		2	–	6	–	0
North Dakota Agricultural		–		1	–	4	–	1
Baldwin–Wallace		–		0	–	1	–	0
Chicago P&S		–		0	–	1	–	0
St. Mary's (OH)		–		0	–	3	–	0

The 1905 Drake Bulldogs football team was an American football team that represented Drake University as an independent during the 1905 college football season. In January 1905, Drake hired Willie Heston, star halfback of Michigan, as its head football coach. Heston coached the Bulldogs for the 1905 season. In their only season under Heston, the Bulldogs compiled a 4–4 record and outscored opponents by a total of 151 to 141.

The team played its home games at Haskins Field in Des Moines, Iowa.

== Schedule ==
Date	Opponent	Site	Result	Attendance	Source
September 30	at Penn (IA)	Haskins Field; Des Moines, IA	W 18–6		
October 7	at Coe	Cedar Rapids, IA	W 32–15		
October 21	Grinnell	Haskins Field; Des Moines, IA	L 4–5		
October 28	at Michigan	Regents Field; Ann Arbor, MI	L 0–48		
November 4	Simpson	Haskins Field; Des Moines, IA	W 75–0	1,800	
November 11	Haskell	Haskins Field; Des Moines, IA	W 10–6		
November 18	at Iowa	Iowa Field; Iowa City, IA	L 0–44		
November 30	Iowa State	Haskins Field; Des Moines, IA	L 12–17		
