= 1905 Michigan State Normal Normalites football team =

American college football season

1905 Michigan State Normal Normalites football
- Conference: Independent
- Record: 4–4
- Head coach: Daniel H. Lawrence (2nd season)
- Captain: William N. Braley

1905 Midwestern college football independents records
	Conf.			Overall
Team	W	L	T	W		L		T
Lincoln (MO)		–		3	–	0	–	0
Detroit College		–		1	–	0	–	0
Kansas		–		10	–	1	–	0
Central Michigan		–		7	–	1	–	0
Doane		–		5	–	1	–	0
Nebraska		–		9	–	2	–	0
Saint Louis		–		7	–	2	–	0
Butler		–		7	–	2	–	1
Kansas State		–		6	–	2	–	0
Northern Illinois State		–		3	–	1	–	1
Carthage		–		4	–	2	–	0
Western Illinois		–		4	–	2	–	0
Iowa State		–		6	–	3	–	0
Washington University		–		7	–	3	–	2
Wittenberg		–		7	–	4	–	0
Heidelberg		–		6	–	4	–	0
Iowa State Normal		–		5	–	3	–	2
Cincinnati		–		5	–	3	–	0
Miami (OH)		–		4	–	3	–	0
Missouri		–		5	–	4	–	0
Notre Dame		–		5	–	4	–	0
Fairmount		–		5	–	4	–	1
Haskell		–		5	–	4	–	1
Lake Forest		–		6	–	5	–	0
Wabash		–		6	–	5	–	0
Drake		–		4	–	4	–	0
Michigan State Normal		–		4	–	4	–	0
Marquette		–		3	–	4	–	0
South Dakota State		–		2	–	3	–	0
Ohio		–		2	–	5	–	2
DePauw		–		3	–	6	–	0
Mount Union		–		2	–	6	–	0
North Dakota Agricultural		–		1	–	4	–	1
Baldwin–Wallace		–		0	–	1	–	0
Chicago P&S		–		0	–	1	–	0
St. Mary's (OH)		–		0	–	3	–	0

The 1905 Michigan State Normal Normalites football team represented Michigan State Normal College (later renamed Eastern Michigan University) as an independent during the 1905 college football season. In their second and final season under head coach Daniel H. Lawrence, the Normalites compiled a record of 4–4 and were outscored by their opponents by a combined total of 157 to 81. The team lost to Olivet College by a 69 to 0 score. William N. Braley was the team captain.

== Schedule ==
Date	Opponent	Site	Result	Source
September 30	Michigan freshmen	Ypsilanti, MI	L 0–30	
October 7	Detroit Business University		W 30–0	
October 14	at Michigan Military Academy	Ypsilanti, MI	W 17–12	
October 21	Alumni		W 16–0	
October 28	at Olivet	Olivet, MI	L 0–69	
November 4	at Michigan School for the Deaf	Flint, MI	W 6–5	
November 17	at Central Michigan	Mount Pleasant, MI (rivalry)	L 0–13	
November 29	at Hillsdale	Hillsdale, MI	L 12–38	
