= 1905 Missouri Tigers football team =

American college football season

1905 Missouri Tigers football
- Conference: Independent
- Record: 5–4
- Head coach: John McLean (3rd season)
- Captain: Harvey W. Anderson
- Home stadium: Rollins Field

1905 Midwestern college football independents records
	Conf.			Overall
Team	W	L	T	W		L		T
Lincoln (MO)		–		3	–	0	–	0
Detroit College		–		1	–	0	–	0
Kansas		–		10	–	1	–	0
Central Michigan		–		7	–	1	–	0
Doane		–		5	–	1	–	0
Nebraska		–		9	–	2	–	0
Saint Louis		–		7	–	2	–	0
Butler		–		7	–	2	–	1
Kansas State		–		6	–	2	–	0
Northern Illinois State		–		3	–	1	–	1
Carthage		–		4	–	2	–	0
Western Illinois		–		4	–	2	–	0
Iowa State		–		6	–	3	–	0
Washington University		–		7	–	3	–	2
Wittenberg		–		7	–	4	–	0
Heidelberg		–		6	–	4	–	0
Iowa State Normal		–		5	–	3	–	2
Cincinnati		–		5	–	3	–	0
Miami (OH)		–		4	–	3	–	0
Missouri		–		5	–	4	–	0
Notre Dame		–		5	–	4	–	0
Fairmount		–		5	–	4	–	1
Haskell		–		5	–	4	–	1
Lake Forest		–		6	–	5	–	0
Wabash		–		6	–	5	–	0
Drake		–		4	–	4	–	0
Michigan State Normal		–		4	–	4	–	0
Marquette		–		3	–	4	–	0
South Dakota State		–		2	–	3	–	0
Ohio		–		2	–	5	–	2
DePauw		–		3	–	6	–	0
Mount Union		–		2	–	6	–	0
North Dakota Agricultural		–		1	–	4	–	1
Baldwin–Wallace		–		0	–	1	–	0
Chicago P&S		–		0	–	1	–	0
St. Mary's (OH)		–		0	–	3	–	0

The 1905 Missouri Tigers football team was an American football team that represented the University of Missouri as an independent during the 1905 college football season. The team compiled a 5–4 record and outscored its opponents by a combined total of 94 to 79. John McLean was the head coach for the third of three seasons. The team played its home games at Rollins Field in Columbia, Missouri.

== Schedule ==
Date	Time	Opponent	Site	Result	Attendance	Source
September 30		Kirksville Normal	Rollins Field; Columbia, MO	W 6–0		
October 6		Simpson	Rollins Field; Columbia, MO	W 26–0		
October 14		Missouri Mines	Rollins Field; Columbia, MO	W 28–0		
October 21		Haskell	Rollins Field; Columbia, MO	W 6–0		
October 28		Tarkio	Rollins Field; Columbia, MO	W 18–0		
November 4		at Purdue	Stuart Field; West Lafayette, IN	L 0–24	2,500	
November 11		Saint Louis	Rollins Field; Columbia, MO	L 0–17		
November 18		at Washington University	Washington University Stadium; St. Louis, MO	L 10–14		
November 30	2:00 p.m.	vs. Kansas	Association Park; Kansas City, MO (rivalry)	L 0–24	8,000	
