= 1905 Lincoln Tigers football team =

American college football season

1905 Lincoln Tigers football

Missouri (region) (contested)
- Conference: Independent
- Record: 3–0
- Head coach: Romeo West (1st season)

1905 Midwestern college football independents records
| | Conf. | | | Overall |
| Team | W | L | T | W | | L | | T |
|---|---|---|---|---|---|---|---|---|
| Lincoln (MO) | | – | | 3 | – | 0 | – | 0 |
| Detroit College | | – | | 1 | – | 0 | – | 0 |
| Kansas | | – | | 10 | – | 1 | – | 0 |
| Central Michigan | | – | | 7 | – | 1 | – | 0 |
| Doane | | – | | 5 | – | 1 | – | 0 |
| Nebraska | | – | | 9 | – | 2 | – | 0 |
| Saint Louis | | – | | 7 | – | 2 | – | 0 |
| Butler | | – | | 7 | – | 2 | – | 1 |
| Kansas State | | – | | 6 | – | 2 | – | 0 |
| Northern Illinois State | | – | | 3 | – | 1 | – | 1 |
| Carthage | | – | | 4 | – | 2 | – | 0 |
| Western Illinois | | – | | 4 | – | 2 | – | 0 |
| Iowa State | | – | | 6 | – | 3 | – | 0 |
| Washington University | | – | | 7 | – | 3 | – | 2 |
| Wittenberg | | – | | 7 | – | 4 | – | 0 |
| Heidelberg | | – | | 6 | – | 4 | – | 0 |
| Iowa State Normal | | – | | 5 | – | 3 | – | 2 |
| Cincinnati | | – | | 5 | – | 3 | – | 0 |
| Miami (OH) | | – | | 4 | – | 3 | – | 0 |
| Missouri | | – | | 5 | – | 4 | – | 0 |
| Notre Dame | | – | | 5 | – | 4 | – | 0 |
| Fairmount | | – | | 5 | – | 4 | – | 1 |
| Haskell | | – | | 5 | – | 4 | – | 1 |
| Lake Forest | | – | | 6 | – | 5 | – | 0 |
| Wabash | | – | | 6 | – | 5 | – | 0 |
| Drake | | – | | 4 | – | 4 | – | 0 |
| Michigan State Normal | | – | | 4 | – | 4 | – | 0 |
| Marquette | | – | | 3 | – | 4 | – | 0 |
| South Dakota State | | – | | 2 | – | 3 | – | 0 |
| Ohio | | – | | 2 | – | 5 | – | 2 |
| DePauw | | – | | 3 | – | 6 | – | 0 |
| Mount Union | | – | | 2 | – | 6 | – | 0 |
| North Dakota Agricultural | | – | | 1 | – | 4 | – | 1 |
| Baldwin–Wallace | | – | | 0 | – | 1 | – | 0 |
| Chicago P&S | | – | | 0 | – | 1 | – | 0 |
| St. Mary's (OH) | | – | | 0 | – | 3 | – | 0 |

The 1905 Lincoln Tigers football team represented Lincoln Institute—now known as Lincoln University—in Jefferson City, Missouri as an independent during the 1905 college football season. The Lincoln football team finished the season with a perfect record of 3–0, outscoring opponents 37 to 11 on the season. The game in Kansas City was played in the recently constructed Sportsman's Park. These grounds were previously home to the Kansas City Blue Stockings. The team was coached by Romeo West, secretary and librarian at Lincoln Institute.

== Schedule ==
| Date | Time | Opponent | Site | Result | Source |
|---|---|---|---|---|---|
| November 3 | 2:40 p.m. | Western University (KS) | Jefferson City, MO | W 15–5 | |
| November 18 | | at University of Kansas colored team | Sportsman's Park; Kansas City, MO | W 11–0 | |
| November 30 | | at Chicago Maroons | St. Louis, MO | W 11–6 | |
