= 1905 Butler Christians football team =

American college football season

1905 Butler Christians football
- Conference: Independent
- Record: 7–2–1
- Head coach: Edgar Wingard (2nd season)
- Captain: Kingsbury
- Home stadium: Irwin Field, Washington Park

1905 Midwestern college football independents records
	Conf.			Overall
Team	W	L	T	W		L		T
Lincoln (MO)		–		3	–	0	–	0
Detroit College		–		1	–	0	–	0
Kansas		–		10	–	1	–	0
Central Michigan		–		7	–	1	–	0
Doane		–		5	–	1	–	0
Nebraska		–		9	–	2	–	0
Saint Louis		–		7	–	2	–	0
Butler		–		7	–	2	–	1
Kansas State		–		6	–	2	–	0
Northern Illinois State		–		3	–	1	–	1
Carthage		–		4	–	2	–	0
Western Illinois		–		4	–	2	–	0
Iowa State		–		6	–	3	–	0
Washington University		–		7	–	3	–	2
Wittenberg		–		7	–	4	–	0
Heidelberg		–		6	–	4	–	0
Iowa State Normal		–		5	–	3	–	2
Cincinnati		–		5	–	3	–	0
Miami (OH)		–		4	–	3	–	0
Missouri		–		5	–	4	–	0
Notre Dame		–		5	–	4	–	0
Fairmount		–		5	–	4	–	1
Haskell		–		5	–	4	–	1
Lake Forest		–		6	–	5	–	0
Wabash		–		6	–	5	–	0
Drake		–		4	–	4	–	0
Michigan State Normal		–		4	–	4	–	0
Marquette		–		3	–	4	–	0
South Dakota State		–		2	–	3	–	0
Ohio		–		2	–	5	–	2
DePauw		–		3	–	6	–	0
Mount Union		–		2	–	6	–	0
North Dakota Agricultural		–		1	–	4	–	1
Baldwin–Wallace		–		0	–	1	–	0
Chicago P&S		–		0	–	1	–	0
St. Mary's (OH)		–		0	–	3	–	0

The 1905 Butler Christians football team represented Butler University as an independent during the 1905 college football season. Led by Edgar Wingard in his second and final season as head coach, the Christians compiled a record of 7–2–1.

== Schedule ==
Date	Opponent	Site	Result	Source
September 23	Shortridge High School	Irwin Field; Indianapolis, IN	W 17–0	
September 25	at Wabash Athletic Association	Wabash, IN	W 6–0	
September 30	at Indiana	Jordan Field; Bloomington, IN	L 0–31	
October 11	Winona Tech (IN)	Irwin Field; Indianapolis, IN	W 31–0	
October 13	at Shelbyville Business College	Shelbyville, IN	W 47–0	
October 21	at Rose Polytechnic	Terre Haute, IN	T 6–6	
October 28	at Wittenberg	Springfield, OH	L 10–12	
November 1	Miami (OH)	Irwin Field; Indianapolis, IN	W 17–0	
November 11	Franklin (IN)	Irwin Field; Indianapolis, IN	W 64–0	
November 18	DePauw	Washington Park; Indianapolis, IN	W 18–17	
