= 1905 Miami Redskins football team =

American college football season

1905 Miami Redskins football
- Conference: Independent
- Record: 4–3
- Head coach: None
- Home stadium: Miami Field

1905 Midwestern college football independents records
	Conf.			Overall
Team	W	L	T	W		L		T
Lincoln (MO)		–		3	–	0	–	0
Detroit College		–		1	–	0	–	0
Kansas		–		10	–	1	–	0
Central Michigan		–		7	–	1	–	0
Doane		–		5	–	1	–	0
Nebraska		–		9	–	2	–	0
Saint Louis		–		7	–	2	–	0
Butler		–		7	–	2	–	1
Kansas State		–		6	–	2	–	0
Northern Illinois State		–		3	–	1	–	1
Carthage		–		4	–	2	–	0
Western Illinois		–		4	–	2	–	0
Iowa State		–		6	–	3	–	0
Washington University		–		7	–	3	–	2
Wittenberg		–		7	–	4	–	0
Heidelberg		–		6	–	4	–	0
Iowa State Normal		–		5	–	3	–	2
Cincinnati		–		5	–	3	–	0
Miami (OH)		–		4	–	3	–	0
Missouri		–		5	–	4	–	0
Notre Dame		–		5	–	4	–	0
Fairmount		–		5	–	4	–	1
Haskell		–		5	–	4	–	1
Lake Forest		–		6	–	5	–	0
Wabash		–		6	–	5	–	0
Drake		–		4	–	4	–	0
Michigan State Normal		–		4	–	4	–	0
Marquette		–		3	–	4	–	0
South Dakota State		–		2	–	3	–	0
Ohio		–		2	–	5	–	2
DePauw		–		3	–	6	–	0
Mount Union		–		2	–	6	–	0
North Dakota Agricultural		–		1	–	4	–	1
Baldwin–Wallace		–		0	–	1	–	0
Chicago P&S		–		0	–	1	–	0
St. Mary's (OH)		–		0	–	3	–	0

The 1905 Miami Redskins football team was an American football team that represented Miami University during the 1905 college football season. Miami compiled a 4–3 record during the season. Every game of the season is listed by Miami to be a shutout.

== Schedule ==
Date	Opponent	Site	Result	Source
September 30	Hamilton A.C.	Miami Field; Oxford, OH	W 52–0	
October 7	Antioch	Miami Field; Oxford, OH	W 9–0	
October 14	at Centre	Danville, KY	L 0–24	
November 1	at Butler	Irwin Field; Indianapolis, IN	L 0–17	
November 11	Georgetown (KY)	Miami Field; Oxford, OH	W 42–0	
November 18	at Wittenberg	Springfield, OH	L 0–35 (Note: Miami University lists the score to be 0–35, College Football Data Warehouse lists 18–35)	
November 30	at Marshall	Huntington, WV (Note: Marshall lists the game to be in Oxford, OH)	W 35–0 (Note: Marshall University lists the score to be 35–5)	
