= 1905 Ohio Green and White football team =

American college football season

1905 Ohio Green and White football
- Conference: Independent
- Record: 2–5–2
- Head coach: Joseph Railsback (1st season)

1905 Midwestern college football independents records
	Conf.			Overall
Team	W	L	T	W		L		T
Lincoln (MO)		–		3	–	0	–	0
Detroit College		–		1	–	0	–	0
Kansas		–		10	–	1	–	0
Central Michigan		–		7	–	1	–	0
Doane		–		5	–	1	–	0
Nebraska		–		9	–	2	–	0
Saint Louis		–		7	–	2	–	0
Butler		–		7	–	2	–	1
Kansas State		–		6	–	2	–	0
Northern Illinois State		–		3	–	1	–	1
Carthage		–		4	–	2	–	0
Western Illinois		–		4	–	2	–	0
Iowa State		–		6	–	3	–	0
Washington University		–		7	–	3	–	2
Wittenberg		–		7	–	4	–	0
Heidelberg		–		6	–	4	–	0
Iowa State Normal		–		5	–	3	–	2
Cincinnati		–		5	–	3	–	0
Miami (OH)		–		4	–	3	–	0
Missouri		–		5	–	4	–	0
Notre Dame		–		5	–	4	–	0
Fairmount		–		5	–	4	–	1
Haskell		–		5	–	4	–	1
Lake Forest		–		6	–	5	–	0
Wabash		–		6	–	5	–	0
Drake		–		4	–	4	–	0
Michigan State Normal		–		4	–	4	–	0
Marquette		–		3	–	4	–	0
South Dakota State		–		2	–	3	–	0
Ohio		–		2	–	5	–	2
DePauw		–		3	–	6	–	0
Mount Union		–		2	–	6	–	0
North Dakota Agricultural		–		1	–	4	–	1
Baldwin–Wallace		–		0	–	1	–	0
Chicago P&S		–		0	–	1	–	0
St. Mary's (OH)		–		0	–	3	–	0

The 1905 Ohio Green and White football team represented Ohio University in the 1905 college football season as an independent. Led by Joseph Railsback in his first only year as head coach, the Green and White compiled a record of 2–5–2, being outscored 48–141.

== Schedule ==
Date	Opponent	Site	Result	Source
	Marietta		T 0–0	
October 7	at Washington & Jefferson	Washington, PA	L 0–57	
October 14	at West Virginia	Morgantown, WV	L 0–28	
	Otterbein		L 5–6	
	Ohio Northern		L 0–44	
	Muskingum		T 0–0	
November 11	Marshall	Central Field; Huntington, WV (rivalry)	L 5–6	
	Marietta		W 6–0	
	Muskingum		W 32–0	
