= 1905 Kansas Jayhawks football team =

American college football season

1905 Kansas Jayhawks football
- Conference: Independent
- Record: 10–1
- Head coach: A. R. Kennedy (2nd season)
- Captain: Arthur Pooler
- Home stadium: McCook Field

1905 Midwestern college football independents records
	Conf.			Overall
Team	W	L	T	W		L		T
Lincoln (MO)		–		3	–	0	–	0
Detroit College		–		1	–	0	–	0
Kansas		–		10	–	1	–	0
Central Michigan		–		7	–	1	–	0
Doane		–		5	–	1	–	0
Nebraska		–		9	–	2	–	0
Saint Louis		–		7	–	2	–	0
Butler		–		7	–	2	–	1
Kansas State		–		6	–	2	–	0
Northern Illinois State		–		3	–	1	–	1
Carthage		–		4	–	2	–	0
Western Illinois		–		4	–	2	–	0
Iowa State		–		6	–	3	–	0
Washington University		–		7	–	3	–	2
Wittenberg		–		7	–	4	–	0
Heidelberg		–		6	–	4	–	0
Iowa State Normal		–		5	–	3	–	2
Cincinnati		–		5	–	3	–	0
Miami (OH)		–		4	–	3	–	0
Missouri		–		5	–	4	–	0
Notre Dame		–		5	–	4	–	0
Fairmount		–		5	–	4	–	1
Haskell		–		5	–	4	–	1
Lake Forest		–		6	–	5	–	0
Wabash		–		6	–	5	–	0
Drake		–		4	–	4	–	0
Michigan State Normal		–		4	–	4	–	0
Marquette		–		3	–	4	–	0
South Dakota State		–		2	–	3	–	0
Ohio		–		2	–	5	–	2
DePauw		–		3	–	6	–	0
Mount Union		–		2	–	6	–	0
North Dakota Agricultural		–		1	–	4	–	1
Baldwin–Wallace		–		0	–	1	–	0
Chicago P&S		–		0	–	1	–	0
St. Mary's (OH)		–		0	–	3	–	0

The 1905 Kansas Jayhawks football team represented the University of Kansas as an independent during the 1905 college football season. In their second season under head coach A. R. Kennedy, the Jayhawks compiled a 10–1 record and outscored opponents by a combined total of 250 to 26. The Jayhawks played home games at McCook Field in Lawrence, Kansas. Arthur Pooler was the team captain.

== Schedule ==
Date	Time	Opponent	Site	Result	Attendance	Source
September 23		William Jewell	McCook Field; Lawrence, KS	W 23–0		
October 4		College of Emporia	McCook Field; Lawrence, KS	W 45–0		
October 7		at Arkansas	The Hill; Fayetteville, AR	W 6–0		
October 9		at Drury	Springfield, MO	W 11–0		
October 14		at Kansas State Normal	Emporia, KS	W 32–0		
October 21		Oklahoma	McCook Field; Lawrence, KS	W 34–0	1,500	
October 28		at Colorado	Broadway Park; Denver, CO	L 0–15		
November 4		Washington University	McCook Field; Lawrence, KS	W 21–0		
November 11		at Washburn	Topeka, KS	W 18–11		
November 25		Kansas State	McCook Field; Lawrence, KS (rivalry)	W 28–0		
November 30	2:00 p.m.	vs. Missouri	Association Park; Kansas City, MO (rivalry)	W 24–0	8,000	
