= 1905 Nebraska Cornhuskers football team =

American college football season

1905 Nebraska Cornhuskers football

Nebraska state champion
- Conference: Independent
- Record: 8–2
- Head coach: Walter C. Booth (6th season)
- Home stadium: Antelope Field

1905 Midwestern college football independents records
	Conf.			Overall
Team	W	L	T	W		L		T
Lincoln (MO)		–		3	–	0	–	0
Detroit College		–		1	–	0	–	0
Kansas		–		10	–	1	–	0
Central Michigan		–		7	–	1	–	0
Doane		–		5	–	1	–	0
Nebraska		–		9	–	2	–	0
Saint Louis		–		7	–	2	–	0
Butler		–		7	–	2	–	1
Kansas State		–		6	–	2	–	0
Northern Illinois State		–		3	–	1	–	1
Carthage		–		4	–	2	–	0
Western Illinois		–		4	–	2	–	0
Iowa State		–		6	–	3	–	0
Washington University		–		7	–	3	–	2
Wittenberg		–		7	–	4	–	0
Heidelberg		–		6	–	4	–	0
Iowa State Normal		–		5	–	3	–	2
Cincinnati		–		5	–	3	–	0
Miami (OH)		–		4	–	3	–	0
Missouri		–		5	–	4	–	0
Notre Dame		–		5	–	4	–	0
Fairmount		–		5	–	4	–	1
Haskell		–		5	–	4	–	1
Lake Forest		–		6	–	5	–	0
Wabash		–		6	–	5	–	0
Drake		–		4	–	4	–	0
Michigan State Normal		–		4	–	4	–	0
Marquette		–		3	–	4	–	0
South Dakota State		–		2	–	3	–	0
Ohio		–		2	–	5	–	2
DePauw		–		3	–	6	–	0
Mount Union		–		2	–	6	–	0
North Dakota Agricultural		–		1	–	4	–	1
Baldwin–Wallace		–		0	–	1	–	0
Chicago P&S		–		0	–	1	–	0
St. Mary's (OH)		–		0	–	3	–	0

The 1905 Nebraska Cornhuskers football team represented the University of Nebraska as an independent during the 1905 college football season. Led by Walter C. Booth in his sixth and final season as head coach, the Cornhuskers compiled a record of 8–2, excluding one exhibition game. Nebraska played home games at Antelope Field in Lincoln, Nebraska.

Booth retired from coaching following the 1905 season, departing Nebraska with a 46–8–1 record. His 46 wins were a school record until 1966, when he was passed by Bob Devaney.

== Schedule ==
Date	Time	Opponent	Site	Result	Attendance	Source
September 23		Grand Island	Antelope Field; Lincoln, NE	W 30–0		
September 30		Lincoln High School	Antelope Field; Lincoln, NE	W 20–0 (exhibition)		
October 7		South Dakota	Antelope Field; Lincoln, NE	W 42–6		
October 14	3:00 p.m.	Knox	Antelope Field; Lincoln, NE	W 16–0		
October 21		at Michigan	Regents Field; Ann Arbor, MI	L 0–31	5,000	
October 28	3:00 p.m.	at Creighton	Vinton Park; Omaha, NE	W 102–0		
November 4	3:00 p.m.	Iowa State	Antelope Field; Lincoln, NE (rivalry)	W 21–0		
November 11		Colorado	Antelope Field; Lincoln, NE (rivalry)	W 18–0	4,012–7,000	
November 18		at Minnesota	Northrop Field; Minneapolis, MN (rivalry)	L 0–35	10,000	
November 25		Doane	Antelope Field; Lincoln, NE	W 43–5		
November 30		Illinois	Antelope Field; Lincoln, NE	W 24–6		

== Coaching staff ==
Coach	Position	First year	Alma mater
Walter C. Booth	Head coach	1900	Princeton
John Westover	Assistant coach	1904	Nebraska
Jack Best	Trainer	1890	Nebraska

== Roster ==
Barta, Frank G
Barwick, Leonard QB
Bender, Johnny HB
Benedict, Maurice QB
Borg, Charles C
Burns, Donald T
Cotton, Charles RG
Craig, Hugh HB
Denslow, Lloyd E
Eager, Earl HB
Graves, Elliot HB
Hunter, Fred RG
Johnson, William E
Lundin, Alford T
Mason, Cyrus LT
Mason, John FB
McDonald, Gil E
Mills, Leslie QB
Morse, C.L. QB
Nelson, Thomas G
Ringer, John LG
Schmidt, Francis HB
Taylor, Robert RG
Weller, John HB
Wenstrand, Ralph G
Wilson, Harry HB

== Game summaries ==
=== Grand Island ===
Grand Island at Nebraska

Team	1	2	Total
Grand Island			0
• Nebraska			30

- Date: September 23
- Location: Antelope Field, Lincoln, NE

Booth missed Nebraska's season-opening win with an illness. This was the final meeting between Grand Island and Nebraska.

=== Lincoln High ===
Lincoln High at Nebraska

Team	1	2	Total
Lincoln High			0
• Nebraska			20

- Date: September 30
- Location: Antelope Field, Lincoln, NE

This was the eighth and final exhibition game between Lincoln High and Nebraska.

=== South Dakota ===
South Dakota at Nebraska

Team	1	2	Total
South Dakota			6
• Nebraska			42

- Date: October 7
- Location: Antelope Field, Lincoln, NE

South Dakota's only points came after returning a fumble for a touchdown. Nebraska dominated the remainder of the game to win 42–6.

=== Knox ===
Knox at Nebraska

Team	1	2	Total
Knox			0
• Nebraska			16

- Date: October 14
- Location: Antelope Field, Lincoln, NE

Nebraska defeated Knox 16–0 in what was described as "another early season walk through warm up game."

=== At Michigan ===
Nebraska at Michigan

Team	1	2	Total
Nebraska	0	0	0
• Michigan	0	31	31

- Date: October 21
- Location: Regents Field, Ann Arbor, MI

Nebraska met Michigan for the first time in 1905, the final season Michigan played at Regents Field. The Wolverines were led by Fielding H. Yost, marking the first time NU had played one of its past head coaches. Michigan pulled away after a scoreless first half to win 31–0.

=== At Creighton ===
Nebraska at Creighton

Team	1	2	Total
• Nebraska	40	62	102
Creighton	0	0	0

- Date: October 28
- Location: Omaha, NE

A week after a humbling loss at Michigan, Nebraska set new program records for points scored and margin of victory in a 102–0 win over Creighton in Omaha. NU scored more points in the second half than in the first despite an enormous lead.

=== Iowa State ===
Iowa State at Nebraska

Team	1	2	Total
Iowa State			0
• Nebraska			21

- Date: November 4
- Location: Antelope Field, Lincoln, NE
- Game weather: Rain

After a three-year hiatus, Nebraska renewed its series with Iowa State. NU shut out the Cyclones 21–0 in heavy rain.

=== Colorado ===
Colorado at Nebraska

Team	1	2	Total
Colorado	0	0	0
• Nebraska	6	12	18

- Date: November 11
- Location: Antelope Field, Lincoln, NE
- Game attendance: 4,012

Nebraska shut out Coloraso in front of 4,012 fans, a school record for a non-Thanksgiving Day crowd.

=== At Minnesota ===
Nebraska at Minnesota

Team	1	2	Total
Nebraska			0
• Minnesota			35

- Date: November 18
- Location: Northrop Field, Minneapolis, MN

=== Doane ===
Doane at Nebraska

Team	1	2	Total
Doane	0	5	5
• Nebraska	37	6	43

- Date: November 25
- Location: Antelope Field, Lincoln, NE

Nebraska claimed a sixth state championship with a 43–5 victory over Doane.

=== Illinois ===
Illinois at Nebraska

Team	1	2	Total
Illinois	6	0	6
• Nebraska	12	12	24

- Date: November 30
- Location: Antelope Field, Lincoln, NE
