= Frank Cayou =

American football player and sports coach (1878–1948)

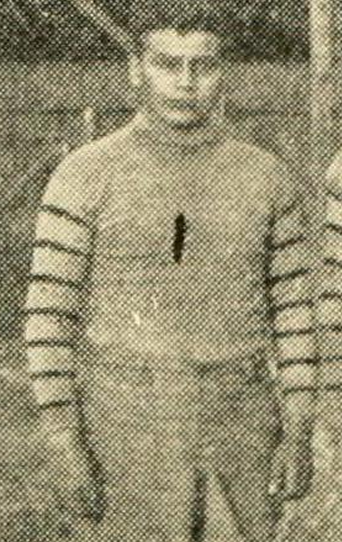
- Cayou at Wabash, c. 1907

Biographical details
- Born: March 7, 1878; Decatur, Nebraska, U.S.
- Died: May 7, 1948 (aged 70); Hominy, Oklahoma, U.S.

Playing career

Football
- 1895–1898: Carlisle
- 1898: Dickinson
- 1899–1901: Illinois

Track and field
- 1896–1898: Carlisle
- 1899: Dickinson
- 1900–1902: Illinois
- Positions: Quarterback, running back

Coaching career (HC unless noted)

Football
- 1902: Champaign Central HS (IL)
- 1904–1907: Wabash
- 1908–1912: Washington University
- 1921–1922: Great Lakes Naval Station

Basketball
- 1908–1910: Washington University
- 1911–1913: Washington University

Baseball
- 1905: Wabash

Track
- 1902–1904: Arcola Fire Department (IL)
- 1918–1921: Illinois Athletic Club
- 1921–1923: Great Lakes Navy

Head coaching record
- Overall: 38–30–4 (college football); 25–23 (college basketball); 18–5 (college baseball)

Francis Mitchell Cayou (March 7, 1878 – May 7, 1948) an American football player and coach of football, basketball, and baseball. He served as the head football coach at Wabash College from 1904 to 1907 and at Washington University in St. Louis from 1908 to 1912, compiling a career college football coaching record of 38–30–4. He also coached basketball at Washington University from 1908 to 1910 and again from 1911 to 1913, tallying a mark of 25–23. Cayou was a member of the Omaha tribe and attended the Carlisle Indian Industrial School and then Dickinson College. He played football as a quarterback for the Carlisle Indians. After the close of Carlisle's 1898 season, Cayou and Eddie Rogers played for Dickinson College, where they were enrolled in law school, in their Thanksgiving Day loss versus Penn State. He also played quarterback and running back for Illinois Fighting Illini and was noted for his speed that was displayed on a 95-yard kickoff return versus Purdue. Cayou also set the Illinois Fighting Illini track record in the 220-yard dash, clocking in at 22 3/5 sec, before bettering it with a 22 sec run. Cayou served as captain of the Illinois track team in 1902 when elected captain, O.C. Bell, fell ill.

Cayou, known as Standing Elk, also served as chief of the Omaha tribe.

== Coaching career ==
Cayou was the 16th head football coach at Wabash College, serving from 1904 to 1907, and compiling a record of 20–12–1. In 1905, Cayou led Wabash to one of its most impressive upsets when it defeated Notre Dame, 5–0, at South Bend. It proved to be the Fighting Irish's only home-field loss in 125 games between 1899 and 1928.

On January 6, 1918, Cayou became the athletic director of the Illinois Athletic Club, where he served until 1921. Cayou also served as the athletic director of the Naval Station Great Lakes in Illinois from 1921 to 1923.

== Head coaching record ==
=== College football ===
Year	Team	Overall	Conference	Standing	Bowl/playoffs
Wabash Little Giants (Independent) (1904–1907)
1904	Wabash	4–4			
1905	Wabash	6–5			
1906	Wabash	5–1–1			
1907	Wabash	5–2			
Wabash:		20–12–1			
Washington University Pikers (Missouri Valley Conference) (1908–1912)
1908	Washington University	4–4–1	0–2	6th	
1909	Washington University	3–4	0–2	7th	
1910	Washington University	3–4	0–2	6th	
1911	Washington University	4–2–2	0–0–2	T–3rd	
1912	Washington University	4–4	0–2	6th	
Washington University:		18–18–3	0–8–2		
Total:		38–30–4			
