= 1905 Kansas State Aggies football team =

American college football season

1905 Kansas State Aggies football
- Conference: Independent
- Record: 6–2
- Head coach: Mike Ahearn (1st season)

1905 Midwestern college football independents records
	Conf.			Overall
Team	W	L	T	W		L		T
Lincoln (MO)		–		3	–	0	–	0
Detroit College		–		1	–	0	–	0
Kansas		–		10	–	1	–	0
Central Michigan		–		7	–	1	–	0
Doane		–		5	–	1	–	0
Nebraska		–		9	–	2	–	0
Saint Louis		–		7	–	2	–	0
Butler		–		7	–	2	–	1
Kansas State		–		6	–	2	–	0
Northern Illinois State		–		3	–	1	–	1
Carthage		–		4	–	2	–	0
Western Illinois		–		4	–	2	–	0
Iowa State		–		6	–	3	–	0
Washington University		–		7	–	3	–	2
Wittenberg		–		7	–	4	–	0
Heidelberg		–		6	–	4	–	0
Iowa State Normal		–		5	–	3	–	2
Cincinnati		–		5	–	3	–	0
Miami (OH)		–		4	–	3	–	0
Missouri		–		5	–	4	–	0
Notre Dame		–		5	–	4	–	0
Fairmount		–		5	–	4	–	1
Haskell		–		5	–	4	–	1
Lake Forest		–		6	–	5	–	0
Wabash		–		6	–	5	–	0
Drake		–		4	–	4	–	0
Michigan State Normal		–		4	–	4	–	0
Marquette		–		3	–	4	–	0
South Dakota State		–		2	–	3	–	0
Ohio		–		2	–	5	–	2
DePauw		–		3	–	6	–	0
Mount Union		–		2	–	6	–	0
North Dakota Agricultural		–		1	–	4	–	1
Baldwin–Wallace		–		0	–	1	–	0
Chicago P&S		–		0	–	1	–	0
St. Mary's (OH)		–		0	–	3	–	0

The 1905 Kansas State Aggies football team represented Kansas State Agricultural College—now known as Kansas State University—as an independent during the 1905 college football season. Led by first-year head coach Mike Ahearn, the Aggies compiled a record of 6–2.

The Aggies were defeated 28–0 in their rivalry game against Kansas.

== Schedule ==
Date	Opponent	Site	Result	Source
October 7	Ottawa	Manhattan, KS	W 29–0	
October 14	Washburn	Manhattan, KS	L 5–12	
October 21	at Kansas Wesleyan	Salina, KS	W 24–0	
October 23	Saint Mary (KS)	Manhattan, KS	W 10–5	
October 31	Fairmount	Manhattan, KS	W 11–6	
November 18	Haskell second team	Manhattan, KS	W 60–0	
November 25	at Kansas	McCook Field; Lawrence, KS (rivalry)	L 0–28	
November 30	Kansas State Normal	Manhattan, KS	W 10–0	
