= 1905 Wabash Little Giants football team =

American college football season

1905 Wabash Little Giants football
- Conference: Independent
- Record: 6–5
- Head coach: Frank Cayou (2nd season)

1905 Midwestern college football independents records
	Conf.			Overall
Team	W	L	T	W		L		T
Lincoln (MO)		–		3	–	0	–	0
Detroit College		–		1	–	0	–	0
Kansas		–		10	–	1	–	0
Central Michigan		–		7	–	1	–	0
Doane		–		5	–	1	–	0
Nebraska		–		9	–	2	–	0
Saint Louis		–		7	–	2	–	0
Butler		–		7	–	2	–	1
Kansas State		–		6	–	2	–	0
Northern Illinois State		–		3	–	1	–	1
Carthage		–		4	–	2	–	0
Western Illinois		–		4	–	2	–	0
Iowa State		–		6	–	3	–	0
Washington University		–		7	–	3	–	2
Wittenberg		–		7	–	4	–	0
Heidelberg		–		6	–	4	–	0
Iowa State Normal		–		5	–	3	–	2
Cincinnati		–		5	–	3	–	0
Miami (OH)		–		4	–	3	–	0
Missouri		–		5	–	4	–	0
Notre Dame		–		5	–	4	–	0
Fairmount		–		5	–	4	–	1
Haskell		–		5	–	4	–	1
Lake Forest		–		6	–	5	–	0
Wabash		–		6	–	5	–	0
Drake		–		4	–	4	–	0
Michigan State Normal		–		4	–	4	–	0
Marquette		–		3	–	4	–	0
South Dakota State		–		2	–	3	–	0
Ohio		–		2	–	5	–	2
DePauw		–		3	–	6	–	0
Mount Union		–		2	–	6	–	0
North Dakota Agricultural		–		1	–	4	–	1
Baldwin–Wallace		–		0	–	1	–	0
Chicago P&S		–		0	–	1	–	0
St. Mary's (OH)		–		0	–	3	–	0

The 1905 Wabash Little Giants football team represented Wabash College as an independent during the 1905 college football season. Led by second-year head coach Frank Cayou, the Little Giants compiled a record of 6–5. The team managed one of its most impressive upsets when it defeated Notre Dame, 5–0, on October 21, at South Bend. It proved to be the Fighting Irish's only home-field loss in 125 games between 1899 and 1928. Notre Dame had originally considered the game a "practice game" and expected to win easily when the game was scheduled the previous year, but began to take the team more seriously as the 1905 season developed.

== Schedule ==
Date	Opponent	Site	Result	Source
September 23	Sheridan High School (IN)	Crawfordsville, IN	W 80–0	
September 30	at Chicago	Marshall Field; Chicago, IL	L 0–15	
October 4	at Illinois	Illinois Field; Champaign, IL	L 0–6	
October 7	at Northwestern	Northwestern Field; Evanston, IL	L 0–5	
October 14	at Purdue	Stuart Field; West Lafayette, IN	L 0–12	
October 21	at Notre Dame	Cartier Field; Notre Dame, IN	W 5–0	
October 27	Franklin (IN)	Crawfordsville, IN	W (forfeit)	
November 4	Lake Forest	Crawfordsville, IN	W 53–0	
November 11	Knox (IL)	Crawfordsville, IN	W 57–0	
November 18	at Indiana	Bloomington, IN	L 0–40	
November 25	DePauw	Crawfordsville, IN	W 52–0	
November 30	Earlham	Crawfordsville, IN	Cancelled	

== Roster ==
- Shank, Right end
- Knudsen, Right tackle
- Hess, Right guard
- Brown, Center
- Sprow, Center
- Sutherland, Left guard
- Williams, Left tackle
- Frurip, Left end
- Miller, Quarterback
- Myers, Right halfback
- Harp, Left back
- Spaulding, Left halfback and team captain
