= 1905 Washburn Ichabods football team =

American college football season

1905 Washburn Ichabods football

Third Down Experiment, T 0–0 at Fairmount
- Conference: Kansas College Athletic Conference
- Record: 7–3 ( KCAC)
- Head coach: John H. Outland (2nd season)

The 1905 Washburn Ichabods football team represented Washburn College—now known as Washburn University— as a member of the Kansas College Athletic Conference (KCAC) during the 1905 college football season. Led by second year head coach John H. Outland, the Ichabods compiled an overall record of 7–3.

== Schedule ==
| Date | Opponent | Site | Result | Attendance | Source |
|---|---|---|---|---|---|
| September 30 | College of Emporia | Topeka, KS | W 39–0 | | |
| October 7 | Kansas State Normal | Topeka, KS | W 29–6 | | |
| October 14 | at Kansas State | Manhattan, KS | W 12–5 | | |
| October 21 | Ottawa | Topeka, KS | W 16–6 | | |
| October 30 | Oklahoma | Topeka, KS | W 9–6 | 1,200–1,500 | |
| November 4 | Fairmount | Topeka, KS | W 10–6 | | |
| November 11 | Kansas | Topeka, KS | L 11–18 | | |
| November 18 | at Colorado | Gamble Field; Boulder, CO | L 5–30 | | |
| November 25 | at Denver | University Park; Denver, CO | W 6–0 | | |
| November 30 | at Colorado College | Colorado Springs, CO | L 0–6 | | |
| December 25 | at Fairmount | Wichita, KS (experimental) | T 0–0 | | |
