= 1905 Washburn vs. Fairmount football game =

- First experiment with the forward pass and with the ten-yard requirement for first downs
Washburn Ichabods	Fairmount Wheatshockers
0	0
Head coach: John H. Outland	Head coach: Willis Bates
	1	2	3	4	Total
Washburn	0	0	0	0	0
Fairmount	0	0	0	0	0
- Date: December 25, 1905
- Season: 1905
- Location: Wichita, Kansas

The 1905 Washburn vs. Fairmount football game was a college football game between Fairmount College (now called Wichita State University) and the Washburn Ichabods played on December 25, 1905, in Wichita, Kansas. It marked the first experiment with the forward pass and with the ten-yard requirement for first downs. Despite the game's Christmas Day playing date, It is unclear if the game was considered "regular season", "post season", or "exhibition" in classification.

== Game play ==
Fairmount College was coached by Willis Bates. The head coach for Washburn that season was John H. Outland, but because he was officiating, it is likely that the coaching duties fell to assistant coach (and next year's head coach) Garfield Weede. The game ended in a 0–0 tie.

The conditions for the game were excellent, but neither side was able to approach the other team's goal except by a punt. Only seven first downs were made the entire game—four by Washburn and three by Fairmount. Most of the game was played in the middle of the field, to the disappointment of the fans.

== New rule test ==
=== Safer but not "conducive" ===
Both teams had played a previous game that same season. What made this second game unique was that it was a test of a proposed rule of play. During the game, each team's offense was required to gain ten yards instead of five yards in three downs to earn a new first down.

The experiment was considered a failure. Football legend John H. Outland officiated the game and commented, "It seems to me that the distance required in three downs would almost eliminate touchdowns, except through fakes or flukes." The Los Angeles Times reported that there was much kicking and that the game was considered much safer than regular play, but that the new rule was not "conducive to the sport."

=== Impact ===
Three days later, 62 schools met in New York City to discuss rule changes to make the game safer. As a result of that meeting, the Intercollegiate Athletic Association of the United States, later named the National Collegiate Athletic Association (NCAA), was formed and several other rule changes were made to improve safety for players, including the addition of the forward pass.

=== First forward pass ===
In his history of the sport of football, David M. Nelson concluded that "the first forward passes were thrown at the end of the 1905 season in a game between Fairmount and Washburn colleges in Kansas." According to Nelson, Washburn completed three passes, and Fairmount completed two. Credit for the first pass goes to Fairmount's Bill Davis, who completed a pass to Art Solter.

== See also ==
- History of American football
- Timeline of college football in Kansas
