= Henry J. McGlew =

American football player and coach

Biographical details
- Born: September 26, 1882; Ireland
- Died: February 16, 1926 (aged 43); Los Angeles, California, U.S.

Playing career
- 1901–1903: Notre Dame
- Positions: Quarterback, end

Coaching career (HC unless noted)
- 1904: Notre Dame (Asst.)
- 1905: Notre Dame

Head coaching record
- Overall: 5–4

Henry J. "Fuzzy" McGlew (September 26, 1882 – February 16, 1926) was an Irish-born American quarterback and head coach of the Notre Dame college football program.

== Playing ==
McGlew was born in Ireland and entered Notre Dame from Chelsea, Massachusetts.

In his two years as Notre Dame's starting quarterback from 1901 to 1902, the team achieved a combined record of 14–3–2. His best game came against the American College of Medicine and Surgery in 1902, when he made runs of 80, 65 and 40 yards and scored one touchdown. In 1903, he moved to left end, and helped the team to achieve their first undefeated season. McGlew never once fumbled the ball during his playing career.

== Coaching ==
McGlew was an assistant to Red Salmon in 1904. On January 1, 1905, he became Notre Dame's manager of athletics. When Salmon graduated that June, McGlew succeeded him as head coach. On October 21, 1905, Notre Dame was upset by the Wabash Little Giants 5–0. It was Fighting Irish's only home-field loss in 125 games between 1899 and 1928. The next week, Notre Dame scored its most points in game ever, against American Medical, winning 142 to 0. In November, two of Notre Dame's best linemen left the team, reportedly due to issues with McGlew. Notre Dame finished with a 5–4 record and McGlew did not return for the following season. He died in February 1926.

== Head coaching record ==
Year	Team	Overall	Bowl/playoffs
Notre Dame (Independent) (1905)
1905	Notre Dame	5–4	
Notre Dame:		5–4	
Total:		5–4	
