= Gerry Faust =

American football coach (1935–2024)

Biographical details
- Born: May 21, 1935; Dayton, Ohio, U.S.
- Died: November 11, 2024 (aged 89)

Playing career
- 1955–1957: Dayton
- Position: Quarterback

Coaching career (HC unless noted)
- 1962–1980: Moeller HS (OH)
- 1981–1985: Notre Dame
- 1986–1994: Akron

Head coaching record
- Overall: 73–79–4 (college); 178–23–2 (high school)
- Bowls: 1–1

Gerard Anthony Faust (May 21, 1935 – November 11, 2024) was an American high school and college football coach. He served as the head coach at the University of Notre Dame from 1981 to 1985 and at the University of Akron from 1986 to 1994, compiling a career collegiate record of 73–79–4. From 1962 to 1980, Faust was the head coach at Moeller High School in Cincinnati, Ohio, where he tallied a mark of 178–23–2 and won four High School Football National Championships. Before coaching, Faust enjoyed a successful stint playing as a quarterback at the University of Dayton under former Notre Dame coach Hugh Devore. Faust was offered a partial scholarship to Notre Dame, but enrolled at Dayton, where he graduated in 1958. On June 8, 2024, Faust was inducted into the National High School Football Hall of Fame.

== Coaching career ==
=== Moeller High School ===
Faust had a highly successful run at Moeller High School in Cincinnati, Ohio, from 1962 to 1980, where he built the program from scratch. The Crusaders under Faust had a 178–23–2 record and included seven unbeaten seasons, four national prep titles, and five Ohio state titles in his last six seasons. One of Faust's linebackers at Moeller was John Boehner, who later became a United States Congressman and the 61st Speaker of the United States House of Representatives.

Faust was inducted into the National Federation of State High School Associations Hall of Fame in 2004.

=== Notre Dame ===
It was his high school record, sound ethics and the quality football players from Moeller who later played at Notre Dame, that led Notre Dame officials to take a calculated risk and hire him when Dan Devine stepped down after the 1980 season. For Faust, a devout Roman Catholic, it was a dream come true. He had coveted the head coaching job at Notre Dame for years and said all along that he would never leave Moeller for anything else. Faust inherited a strong squad that included nine of his former players from Moeller. He switched the team's home jerseys from green back to blue, although initially it was a lighter Madonna blue shade than the navy blue that had been previously worn (and returned to in 1984), and kept the players' names on the backs. Faust claimed to have visions of winning more games and national championships and coaching at Notre Dame longer than anyone else. Then when he saw Notre Dame's schedule, he was quoted as saying, "I hope my lifelong dream doesn't end in a nightmare." It proved to be a prophetic statement and his era at Notre Dame, initially referred to as "The Bold Experiment", fell far short of expectations.

Faust's Notre Dame tenure started on a high note with a 27–9 victory over LSU in the 1981 season opener, one of the most widely anticipated games in school history. After top-ranked Michigan lost to Wisconsin on the same day, Notre Dame was voted No. 1 in the polls. The success was short-lived, however, as Michigan defeated Notre Dame the following week, 25–7. It was all downhill after that as the Irish finished 5–6 that year, their first losing season since 1963. Faust ended his stint at Notre Dame with a 30–26–1 record, never winning more than seven games in one season and never contending for a national title. This included four consecutive losses against Air Force, whom the Irish had never lost to prior to 1982. Despite his mediocre record and growing discontent among Irish fans (exemplified in chants of "Oust Faust!"), Faust was allowed to remain at Notre Dame for the entire duration of his five-year contract.

The highlights of Faust's tenure at Notre Dame included a 1983 Liberty Bowl victory over Boston College and an appearance in the 1984 Aloha Bowl. His 1982 squad defeated Michigan by a score of 23–17 and upset the then top-ranked, Dan Marino-led Pittsburgh Panthers, 31–16. In 1983, the Irish opened the season with a 52–6 win over Purdue while his 1984 team defeated Colorado by a score of 55–14 and posted a 44–7 rout over Penn State.

In exactly half of Notre Dame's losses under Faust, the opposition scored the winning points late in the game. The Fighting Irish lost their last three regular season games in 1982, 1983 and 1985 and their last two games in 1981. Only in 1984 did they finish strongly, winning their last four games after three consecutive home losses; the last time that had happened was in 1956.

Going into the 1985 season, hopes were high that things would turn around. With the team at 5–5 and the program rapidly unraveling after a 10–7 loss to LSU in the tenth game, Faust, who said he would never quit, announced his resignation effective at the end of the season and spared the university from having to fire him. His final game was against a Jimmy Johnson-coached Miami team, a humiliating 58–7 loss at the Orange Bowl. It was one of the worst defeats in school history and the second-highest point total ever given up in one game by the Irish; Army rang up 59 points in 1944 while Wisconsin matched Miami's 58 points in 1904. Faust was succeeded by University of Minnesota head coach Lou Holtz.

=== Akron ===
In 1986, Faust was hired by the University of Akron after the school fired head coach Jim Dennison. Dennison, who is the Akron career wins leader for football, was forced out by university president, William Muse and athletic director, Dave Adams. Adams and Muse felt that Faust was more prepared to lead the Zips as they transitioned into a I-A institution. Faust struggled to get acclimated to the small budget school, compiling a record of 25–23–2 in his first five seasons with the Zips. In nine seasons (1986–1994), he achieved a record of 43–53–3. As was the case at Notre Dame, his Zips teams never won more than seven games in one season. Following a 1–10 finish in 1994, he was relieved of his coaching duties and became a fundraiser for the university. Faust's 43 wins placed him 3rd in Akron career wins leaders.

== Later life ==
Despite his unsuccessful coaching tenure at Notre Dame, Faust's love for the school never wavered and he regularly attended Irish home football games. He said, "I had only 26 miserable days at Notre Dame; that's when we lost. Other than that, I was the happiest guy in the world. I loved walking on the campus, loved being there, loved being a part of Notre Dame."

== Personal life and death ==
On April 4, 1964, Faust married Marlene Agruso. They were parents of three children and had six grandchildren. Their son, Steve, is a Notre Dame graduate. Faust lived in Fairlawn, Ohio, a suburb of Akron. He also worked as a motivational speaker.

Faust died on November 11, 2024, at the age of 89.

== Head coaching record ==
=== High school ===
Year	Team	Overall	Conference	Standing	Bowl/playoffs
Archbishop Moeller High School (Greater Catholic League) (1962–1980)
1962	Archbishop Moeller	4–6	2–4	5th	
1963	Archbishop Moeller	9–1	5–1	2nd	
1964	Archbishop Moeller	8–2	4–2	3rd	
1965	Archbishop Moeller	10–0	6–0	1st	
1966	Archbishop Moeller	7–3	6–1	1st	
1967	Archbishop Moeller	8–2	5–2	3rd	
1968	Archbishop Moeller	6–2–2	4–2–1	3rd	
1969	Archbishop Moeller	10–0	7–0	1st	
1970	Archbishop Moeller	9–1	5–1	2nd	
1971	Archbishop Moeller	9–1	4–1	1st	
1972	Archbishop Moeller	8–2	4–1	2nd	
1973	Archbishop Moeller	10–1	5–0	1st	L 34–7 first round playoffs
1974	Archbishop Moeller	10–1	5–0	1st	L 20–10 first round playoffs
1975	Archbishop Moeller	12–0	5–0	1st	W 14–12 Ohio AAA State Championship
1976	Archbishop Moeller	12–0	5–0	1st	W 43–5 Ohio AAA State Championship
1977	Archbishop Moeller	12–0	5–0	1st	W 14–2 Ohio AAA State Championship
1978	Archbishop Moeller	9–1	5–0	1st	
1979	Archbishop Moeller	12–0	4–0	1st	W 41–7 Ohio AAA State Championship
1980	Archbishop Moeller	13–0	4–0	1st	W 30–7 Ohio Division I State Championship
Archbishop Moeller:		178–23–2	90–15–1		
Total:		178–23–2			
National championship Conference title Conference division title or championship game berth

=== College ===
Year	Team	Overall	Conference	Standing	Bowl/playoffs
Notre Dame Fighting Irish (NCAA Division I-A independent) (1981–1985)
1981	Notre Dame	5–6			
1982	Notre Dame	6–4–1			
1983	Notre Dame	7–5			W Liberty
1984	Notre Dame	7–5			L Aloha
1985	Notre Dame	5–6			
Notre Dame:		30–26–1			
Akron Zips (Ohio Valley Conference) (1986)
1986	Akron	7–4	4–3	T–3rd	
Akron Zips (NCAA Division I-A independent) (1987–1991)
1987	Akron	4–7			
1988	Akron	5–6			
1989	Akron	6–4–1			
1990	Akron	3–7–1			
1991	Akron	5–6			
Akron Zips (Mid-American Conference) (1992–1994)
1992	Akron	7–3–1	5–3	T–3rd	
1993	Akron	5–6	4–4	5th	
1994	Akron	1–10	1–8	9th	
Akron:		43–53–3	14–18		
Total:		73–79–4			
