= 1905 Notre Dame football team =

American college football season

1905 Notre Dame football
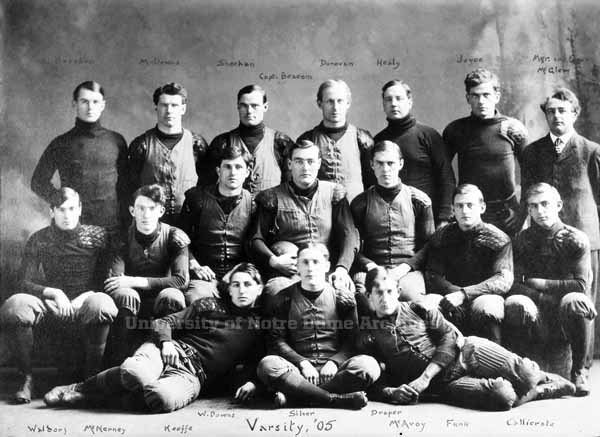
- Conference: Independent
- Record: 5–4
- Head coach: Henry J. McGlew (1st season)
- Captain: Pat Beacom
- Home stadium: Cartier Field

1905 Midwestern college football independents records
	Conf.			Overall
Team	W	L	T	W		L		T
Lincoln (MO)		–		3	–	0	–	0
Detroit College		–		1	–	0	–	0
Kansas		–		10	–	1	–	0
Central Michigan		–		7	–	1	–	0
Doane		–		5	–	1	–	0
Nebraska		–		9	–	2	–	0
Saint Louis		–		7	–	2	–	0
Butler		–		7	–	2	–	1
Kansas State		–		6	–	2	–	0
Northern Illinois State		–		3	–	1	–	1
Carthage		–		4	–	2	–	0
Western Illinois		–		4	–	2	–	0
Iowa State		–		6	–	3	–	0
Washington University		–		7	–	3	–	2
Wittenberg		–		7	–	4	–	0
Heidelberg		–		6	–	4	–	0
Iowa State Normal		–		5	–	3	–	2
Cincinnati		–		5	–	3	–	0
Miami (OH)		–		4	–	3	–	0
Missouri		–		5	–	4	–	0
Notre Dame		–		5	–	4	–	0
Fairmount		–		5	–	4	–	1
Haskell		–		5	–	4	–	1
Lake Forest		–		6	–	5	–	0
Wabash		–		6	–	5	–	0
Drake		–		4	–	4	–	0
Michigan State Normal		–		4	–	4	–	0
Marquette		–		3	–	4	–	0
South Dakota State		–		2	–	3	–	0
Ohio		–		2	–	5	–	2
DePauw		–		3	–	6	–	0
Mount Union		–		2	–	6	–	0
North Dakota Agricultural		–		1	–	4	–	1
Baldwin–Wallace		–		0	–	1	–	0
Chicago P&S		–		0	–	1	–	0
St. Mary's (OH)		–		0	–	3	–	0

The 1905 Notre Dame football team was an American football team that represented the University of Notre Dame as an independent during the 1905 college football season. In its first and only season under head coach Henry J. McGlew, the team compiled a 5–4 record and outscored its opponents by a combined total of 312 to 80.

The Wabash Little Giants traveled to South Bend on October 21 and defeated Notre Dame, 5–0. The upset was Notre Dame's only home-field loss in 125 games between 1899 and 1928. The next week, Notre Dame scored its highest points ever, defeating American Medical, 142 to 0.

The team played its home games at Cartier Field in Notre Dame, Indiana.

== Schedule ==
Date	Opponent	Site	Result	Source
September 30	North Division High School	Cartier Field; Notre Dame, IN	W 44–0	
October 7	Michigan Agricultural	Cartier Field; Notre Dame, IN (rivalry)	W 28–0	
October 14	vs. Wisconsin	Milwaukee, WI	L 0–21	
October 21	Wabash	Cartier Field; Notre Dame, IN	L 0–5	
October 28	American Medical	Cartier Field; Notre Dame, IN	W 142–0	
November 4	DePauw	Cartier Field; Notre Dame, IN	W 71–0	
November 11	at Indiana	Jordan Field; Bloomington, IN	L 5–22	
November 18	Bennett Medical	Cartier Field; Notre Dame, IN	W 22–0	
November 24	at Purdue	Stuart Field; West Lafayette, IN (rivalry)	L 0–32	

== Game summaries ==
=== North Division High School ===
North Division at Notre Dame

Team	1	2	Total
North Division High School	0	0	0
• Notre Dame	21	23	44

- Date: September 30, 1905
- Location: Cartier Field
  Notre Dame, IN
- Elapsed time: 30 minutes

=== Michigan Agricultural ===
MAC at Notre Dame

Team	1	2	Total
Michigan Agricultural college	0	0	0
• Notre Dame	10	15	25

- Date: October 7, 1905
- Location: Cartier Field
  Notre Dame, IN

Footnote= 3 touchdown conversions were made, to make the score 28-0 in ND's favor. But the knowledge on which touchdowns these extra points were completed on is a mystery.

=== Wisconsin ===
Notre Dame at Wisconsin

Team	1	2	Total
Notre Dame	0	0	0
• Wisconsin	16	12	28

- Date: October 14, 1905
- Location: Milwaukee, WI
- Elapsed time: 39 minutes (30 and 9)

=== Wabash ===
Wabash at Notre Dame

Team	1	2	Total
• Wabash	5	0	5
Notre Dame	0	0	0

- Date: October 21, 1905
- Location: Cartier Field
  Notre Dame, IN
- Elapsed time: 55 minutes (30 and 25)

=== American Medical ===
American Medical at Notre Dame

Team	1	2	Total
AMC	0	0	0
• Notre Dame	111	31	142

- Date: October 28, 1905
- Location: Cartier Field
  Notre Dame, IN
- Elapsed time: 33 minutes

=== DePauw ===
DePauw at Notre Dame

Team	1	2	Total
Depauw	0	0	0
• Notre Dame	32	39	71

- Date: November 4, 1905
- Location: Cartier Field
  Notre Dame IN
- Elapsed time: 60 minutes (30 and 30)
- Referee: Kilpatrick

=== Indiana ===
Notre Dame at Indiana

Team	1	2	Total
Notre Dame	5	0	5
• Indiana	6	16	22

- Date: November 11, 1905
- Location: Jordan Field
  Bloomington, IN
- Elapsed time: 60 minutes (30 and 30)

=== Bennett Medical ===
Bennett Medical at Notre Dame

Team	1	2	Total
Benett Medical	0	0	0
• Notre Dame	22	0	22

- Date: November 18, 1905
- Location: Cartier Field
  Notre Dame, IN
- Elapsed time: 32 minutes (25 and 7)
- Referee: McDonald

=== Purdue ===
Notre Dame at Purdue

Team	1	2	Total
Notre Dame	5	0	5
• Purdue	21	11	32

- Date: November 24, 1905
- Location: Stuart Field
  west lafayette, IN
- Elapsed time: 50 minutes (30 and 20)
- Game attendance: 3200
- Referee: Lieutenant Hackett

== Personnel ==
=== Players ===
- Patrick A. Beacom, captain and guard, 6'2", 230 pounds
- Dom Callicrate, end, 5'10-1/2", 160 pounds
- Richard W. "Smush" Donovan, guard, 6', 190 pounds
- Maurice M. Downs, tackle, 5'10", 190 pounds
- William E. Downs, fullback, 5'11", 195 pounds
- William A. Draper, halfback and end, 6'2", 172 pounds
- Arthur Funk, tackle, 5'9", 165 pounds
- Frank T. "Pertoot" Healy, 5'11", 210 pounds
- Thomas Joyce, line, 6'2", 175 pounds
- Barlow McAvoy, end, 5'11", 174 pounds
- Lawrence McNerny, quarterback, 6'2", 172 pounds
- Frank Munson, tackle, 5'10", 185 pounds
- Clarence J. Sheehan, center, 5'11", 190 pounds
- Nathaniel Silver, quarterback, 5'7", 156 pounds
- Rufus "Bumper" Waldorf, fullback, 6', 160 pounds

=== Coaching staff ===
- Head coach: Henry J. McGlew
