= John H. Outland =

American football player and coach (1871–1947)

Biographical details
- Born: March 17, 1871; Hesper, Kansas, U.S.
- Died: March 24, 1947 (aged 76); Laguna Beach, California, U.S.

Playing career

Football
- 1891–1892: Penn (IA)
- 1895–1896: Kansas
- 1897–1899: Penn
- Positions: Tackle, halfback

Coaching career (HC unless noted)

Football
- 1900: Franklin & Marshall
- 1901: Kansas
- 1902: Haskell
- 1904–1905: Washburn
- 1906: Haskell

Baseball
- 1901: Franklin & Marshall

Administrative career (AD unless noted)
- 1904–1905: Washburn

Head coaching record
- Overall: 31–22–3 (football); 2–11 (baseball)

Accomplishments and honors

Awards
- 2× Consensus All-American (1897, 1898); Kansas Sports Hall of Fame (1974)
- College Football Hall of Fame; Inducted in 2001 (profile)

John Henry Outland (March 17, 1871 – March 24, 1947) was an American college football player and coach. He played football at Penn College in Oskaloosa, Iowa, the University of Kansas, and the University of Pennsylvania. He was twice named an All-American while playing for the Penn Quakers, in 1897 as a tackle and in 1898 as a halfback. After playing, Outland coached at Franklin & Marshall College in 1900, the University of Kansas in 1901, Haskell Institute in 1902 and 1906, and Washburn University from 1904 to 1905, compiling a career college football head coaching record of 31–22–3. He is the namesake of the Outland Trophy, an annual award established in 1946 and given to the best interior lineman in college football. Outland was inducted into the College Football Hall of Fame as a player in 2001.

== Early life and playing career ==
Outland was born in Hesper, Kansas to Thomas Outland and Mahala Outland (née Kemp) into a Quaker family who settled in Kansas from Indiana around 1860 during the Bleeding Kansas period as part of a larger Quaker immigration to Kansas in support of the Free State cause. He grew up mostly in Johnson County, Kansas in the towns of Lexington, Kansas (present day DeSoto, Kansas) and Edgerton, Kansas though. He was a member of the first football team at Penn College in Oskaloosa, Iowa in 1891. Outland captained the team in 1892, scoring 32 of the team's 36 points. After starring in football and baseball at the University of Kansas in 1895 and 1896, Outland went to Philadelphia to complete his medical education at the University of Pennsylvania Medical School. There he became one of the few men ever to win All-American football honors as both lineman and the backfield player. He was picked by Walter Camp as a first-team All-American in 1897, as a tackle. In 1898, he was selected again, this time as a halfback. He was captain of the 1898 Pennsylvania team and was voted "Most Popular Man" at the University of Pennsylvania.

Outland worked his way through college and spent his last two summers as a companion to rich young men who were alcoholics. To keep them away from alcohol, Outland took them on camping trips in the Wyoming mountains.

== Coaching career ==
=== Franklin and Marshall ===
In 1900, Outland coached the football team at Franklin & Marshall College in Lancaster, Pennsylvania for one season. His team produced a record of 4–5.

=== Kansas ===
Outland was the eighth head football coach for the University of Kansas Jayhawks located in Lawrence, Kansas and he held that position for the 1901 season. His overall coaching record at Kansas was 3–5–2.

=== Haskell ===
In February 1902, Outland was selected as the football coach at Haskell Institute—now known as Haskell Indian Nations University—in Lawrence. The 1902 Haskell Indians football team compiled a record 8–2–1 with victories over Missouri, Texas, and Kansas. After the victory over Missouri, Outland said his team could "beat Carlisle and some of the Eastern colleges also."

=== Washburn ===
Outland also coached at Washburn University in Topeka, Kansas. He was the ninth head football coach for Washburn and he held that position for two seasons, from 1904 until 1905. His overall coaching record at Washburn was 14–5.

Outland's 1905 season ended with an experimental game with Fairmount, where a new rule forcing the offense to earn a first down in three plays instead of four was in effect. The experiment was considered a failure.

=== Return to Haskell ===
In 1906, Outland returned as head coach of the Haskell Indian Nations football team in Lawrence. The team ended its season with a record of 2 wins and 5 losses, being outscored by a total of 96 to 53. Outland's overall coaching record at Haskell was 10–7–1.

== Later life ==
After receiving his medical degree, Outland returned to Kansas in 1900 where he set up his medical practice first in Lawrence, Kansas which led to his hiring as the head football coach of the University of Kansas. On January 28, 1902 Outland married Ethel Arnett Grimes in her hometown of Dana, Indiana. He then moved his practice to Topeka, Kansas in 1904 in order to coach the Washburn University football team. In 1906 Outland moved his family to Kansas City, Kansas where he joined the very first staff of the brand new Trinity-Lutheran hospital in Kansas City, Missouri as a general practicing surgeon. Later, in about 1916, while still on staff with Trinity-Lutheran hospital he moved his family across state lines to Kansas City, Missouri where he lived until his retirement. During his time as a practicing surgeon he extensively used his own plane, often flying with famous Kansas City early aviation pioneer pilot John Kerr "Tex" LaGrone, to visit patients in rural areas and far flung towns, being the first doctor in the Kansas City area to do so. While practicing medicine in the Kansas City region, Dr. Outland served for many years on the athletic board of the University of Kansas alongside other notable KU alumni, Dr. James Naismith and Dr. Forrest "Phog" Allen amongst others. Dr. Outland also served as a referee for college football games, including the 1907 Iowa State - Nebraska game in which he rendered the decision that negated an Iowa State field goal and preserved a 10-9 Nebraska victory. Upon his retirement he moved to Laguna Beach, California. He also served as a major in the United States Army Medical Corps during World War I.

=== Kansas Relays ===
Outland was the founder of the Kansas Relays, having obtained the inspiration for that event at Penn, when as a student, he saw the Penn Relays just getting under way. For many years he held the post of honorary referee of the Kansas events.

=== Outland Trophy ===
Outland conceived the idea of the Outland Trophy because of his belief that interior lineman were not given enough recognition in college football. The trophy is the third oldest college football trophy. Selection of the winner is made by the Football Writers Association of America.

=== Death ===
Outland suffered a stroke in March 1947 and died at his home in Laguna Beach, California two weeks later on March 24, 1947. He was survived by his wife, Ethel, daughter Mrs. Mary McDougall of New Orleans, Louisiana, and son John Grimes Outland of Dallas, Texas. Outland was laid to rest in Maple Grove Cemetery in Wichita, Kansas near his parents' graves.

== Head coaching record ==
Year	Team	Overall	Conference	Standing	Bowl/playoffs
Franklin & Marshall (Independent) (1900)
1900	Franklin & Marshall	4–5			
Franklin & Marshall:		4–5			
Kansas Jayhawks (Independent) (1901)
1901	Kansas	3–5–2			
Kansas:		3–5–2			
Haskell Indians (Independent) (1902)
1902	Haskell	8–2–1			
Washburn Ichabods (Kansas Collegiate Athletic Conference) (1904–1905)
1904	Washburn	7–2			
1905	Washburn	7–3			
Washburn:		14–5			
Haskell Indians (Independent) (1906)
1906	Haskell	2–5			
Haskell:		10–7–1			
Total:		31–22–3			
