= 1983 Liberty Bowl =

- 25th Liberty Bowl
Boston College Eagles	Notre Dame Fighting Irish
(9–2)	(6–5)
Independent	Independent
18	19
Head coach: Jack Bicknell	Head coach: Gerry Faust
AP / Coaches; 13 / 12
	1	2	3	4	Total
Boston College	6	6	6	0	18
Notre Dame	7	12	0	0	19
- Date: December 29, 1983
- Season: 1983
- Stadium: Liberty Bowl Memorial Stadium
- Location: Memphis, Tennessee
- MVP: QB Doug Flutie (Boston College)
- Referee: Richard Burleson (SEC)
- Attendance: 47,071

United States TV coverage
- Network: Katz Sports
- Announcers: Curt Gowdy, Bud Wilkinson, and Dave Diles

The 1983 Liberty Bowl was a college football postseason bowl game played on December 29, 1983, at Liberty Bowl Memorial Stadium in Memphis, Tennessee. The 25th edition of the Liberty Bowl pitted the Boston College Eagles and the Notre Dame Fighting Irish.

== Background ==
Notre Dame started the season ranked #5 in the polls, rising one spot after beating Purdue to begin the season. Losses to Michigan State and Miami made them fall out of the polls, but the Irish would win their next five games. But they lost their last three games of the season to finish at 6–5, but they were invited to a bowl game for the first time since 1980.

The Eagles began the season 3–0, with victories over Morgan State, Clemson, and Rutgers, which made them get into the AP rankings at #19. However, a loss to #12 West Virginia made them fall back out. They promptly won four straight games over Temple, Yale, Penn State, and Army, while getting back into the rankings at #13 before a loss to Syracuse. A win over Holy Cross and #13 Alabama finished a season where they were invited to their second straight bowl game.

== Game summary ==
Boston College would take the early lead three minutes into the game after a 63-yard drive (on seven plays) ended with a Brian Brennan touchdown catch of a Doug Flutie pass. Brian Waldron's extra point was no good, keeping it 6–0. The Irish responded with an 87-yard drive culminating with an Alan Pinkett touchdown plunge to make it 7–6. A John Mihalik punt was blocked by Mike Golic, and the Irish took advantage four players later with a Blair Kiel touchdown pass to Alvin Miller from 13 yards out. A blocked extra point kept it at 13–6. A 53-yard drive on the next Notre Dame drive ended with a Pinkett score from three yards out to make it 19–6, after another blocked PAT. Boston College responded quickly, with a Flutie pass to Bob Biestek going for 42 yards. Gerald Phelan would catch a pass from 28 yards out for a touchdown to narrow the lead. A failed two-point conversion kept the halftime score at 19–12. The second half was mostly about defense, though Boston College did score once more to get closer, with Flutie hitting Scott Gieselman for a three-yard score midway in the fourth quarter. However, Flutie's pass on the conversion attempt to take the lead was batted away, making the score 19–18. The Eagles would get one more try, as they drove to the 35 of the Irish with 1:08 to go. But Notre Dame would get a turnover on downs and they would hang on to win the game. Flutie was named MVP after throwing for 287 yards on 16-of-37, with 3 touchdowns and 2 interceptions. There were 12 combined punts in the game, with the average being roughly 28 yards. Kiel went 11-of-19 for 151 yards for the Irish. Notre Dame had 19 first downs 225 rushing yards, 151 passing yards, and two turnovers. The Eagles had 15 first downs, 93 rushing yards, 287 passing yards, and two turnovers.

== Aftermath ==
The Irish would return to a bowl game the following year, though they have not returned to the Liberty Bowl since this game. The Eagles also returned to a bowl game the following year, winning the 1985 Cotton Bowl Classic under now Heisman Trophy winner Doug Flutie for their first bowl win since 1941.
