= J. G. Freshour =

American doctor and football coach

Biographical details
- Born: August 15, 1876; Piqua, Ohio, U.S.
- Died: August 18, 1946 (aged 70); Covington, Ohio, U.S.

Playing career
- 1897: Wittenberg
- Position: Halfback

Coaching career (HC unless noted)
- 1906–1907: St. Mary's (OH)

Head coaching record
- Overall: 5–5

James Gladden Freshour (August 15, 1876 – August 18, 1946) was an American medical doctor and a college football coach.

Freshour was born in Miami County, Ohio, to civil war veteran and banker William Freshour and Emma (Shellenberger) Freshour. He had one younger brother, William. He graduated from Wittenberg University with a B. A. degree in 1898, and a M. D. degree at Miami Medical College, Cincinnati, in 1901, the same year his master's degree was conferred upon him at Wittenberg. He married Elizabeth Rayner on November 26, 1902, in Piqua, Ohio. Freshour opened an office in Dayton, Ohio, in 1902 and practiced medicine there until 1909.

Freshour served as the head football coach at St. Mary's College—now known as the University of Dayton—for two seasons, leading the team to a record of 5–1 in 1906 an 0–4 in 1907.

In 1909 Freshour accepted the position as physician and surgeon with the Rio Tinto Copper company, Terrasas, Mexico. He later accepted a similar position at Chihuahuas, Mexico, for LA Republica Mining company, and served on the staff of the Copper Queen Mining company at Bisbee, Arizona.

Elizabeth was granted a divorce in Reno, Nevada in 1911, citing his failure to provide for her despite a lavish lifestyle for himself. At the time of the divorce, she claimed to have not seen him since 1909, when he had taken the position in Mexico.

During World War I, Freshour served as a captain in the 148th Infantry. He was wounded in the Meuse-Argonne Offensive, received the Purple Heart and was cited for the French Medal of Honor and Crois de Guerre.

On May 12, 1925, Freshour married Eva Gaskins Lee. He continued to practice medicine in Piqua after his return from World War I until his retirement in 1936, when he moved to Covington, Ohio. He died August 18, 1946, from a heart ailment, and is buried in Forest Hill Cemetery, Piqua, Ohio.

== Head coaching record ==
Year	Team	Overall	Conference	Standing	Bowl/playoffs
St. Mary's (Ohio) (Independent) (1906–1907)
1906	St. Mary's	5–1			
1907	St. Mary's	0–4			
St. Mary's:		5–5			
Total:		5–5			
