= George Binlein =

American football player and coach (1879–1954)

Biographical details
- Born: 1879; Pittsburgh, Pennsylvania, U.S.
- Died: January 4, 1954 (aged 74–75); Pittsburgh, Pennsylvania, U.S.

Playing career
- 1906–1909: St. Mary's (OH)

Coaching career (HC unless noted)
- 1909: St. Mary's (OH)

Head coaching record
- Overall: 4–3

George B. Binlein (1879 – January 4, 1954) was an American college football player and coach. He served as the head football coach at St. Mary's College—now known as the University of Dayton—in 1909, compiling a record of 4–3. After graduating from Dayton, Binlein served as an instructor at Duquesne University in Pittsburgh, Pennsylvania.

== Head coaching record ==
Year	Team	Overall	Conference	Standing	Bowl/playoffs
St. Mary's (Ohio) (Independent) (1909)
1909	St. Mary's	4–3			
St. Mary's:		4–3			
Total:		4–3			
