= St. Mary's (Ohio) football, 1905–1909 =

American college football seasons

The St. Mary's (Ohio) football program from 1905 to 1909 represented St. Mary's College (later renamed the University of Dayton) in its first five years of intercollegiate football. The team during these early years was led by four head coaches: William Schoen was the head coach in 1905 and compiled a 0–3 record; J. G. Freshour was the head coach from 1906 to 1907, compiling a 5–5 record; Matthew Hill was the head coach in 1908 and compiled a 7–0–1 record; and George Binlein was the head coach in 1909 and compiled a 4–3 record.

== 1905 ==
1905 St. Mary's (Ohio) football
- Conference: Independent
- Record: 0–3
- Head coach: William Schoen (1st season)
- Captain: William Schoen

The 1905 St. Mary's (Ohio) football team represented St. Mary's College as an independent during the 1905 college football season. In its first season of college football, the team compiled a 0–3 record. William Schoen was the head coach.

=== Schedule ===
Date	Opponent	Site	Result
	Riverdale		L 5–6
	Tippecanoe		L 0–11
	Tippecanoe		L 5–36

== 1906 ==
1906 St. Mary's (Ohio) football
- Conference: Independent
- Record: 5–1
- Head coach: J. G. Freshour (1st season)
- Captain: William Schoen

The 1906 St. Mary's (Ohio) football team represented St. Mary's College as an independent during the 1906 college football season. In its first season under head coach J. G. Freshour, the team compiled a 5–1 record.

=== Schedule ===
Date	Opponent	Site	Result
	Germantown		W 29–0
	Oakwood		L 2–11
	Dayton YMCA		W 43–0
	Dayton Varsity		W 28–0
	Wittenberg		W 36–0
	Hamilton		W 42–0

== 1907 ==
1907 St. Mary's (Ohio) football
- Conference: Independent
- Record: 0–4
- Head coach: J. G. Freshour (2nd season)
- Captain: Matthias Wagner

The 1907 St. Mary's (Ohio) football team represented St. Mary's College as an independent during the 1907 college football season. In its second and final season under head coach J. G. Freshour, the team compiled a 0–4 record.

=== Schedule ===
Date	Opponent	Site	Result
	Lebanon		L 0–6
	Deaf Mutes		L 0–10
	Wittenberg		L 0–65
	Xavier		L 5–17

== 1908 ==
1908 St. Mary's (Ohio) football
- Conference: Independent
- Record: 7–0–1
- Head coach: Matthew Hill (1st season)
- Captain: Clarence Frederick

The 1908 St. Mary's (Ohio) football team represented St. Mary's College as an independent during the 1908 college football season. In its first and only season under head coach Matthew Hill, the team compiled a 7–0–1 record and shut out six of eight opponents.

=== Schedule ===
Date	Opponent	Site	Result
	Franklin		W 12–2
	Miamisburg Athletic Club		T 0–0
	Nelson College		W 16–0
	Cedarville		W 24–0
	West Carrollton		W 6–0
	Mercantile Athletic Club		W 12–5
	Miamisburg Athletic Club		W 4–0
	Xavier		W 6–0

== 1909 ==
1909 St. Mary's (Ohio) football
- Conference: Independent
- Record: 4–3
- Head coach: George Binlein (1st season)
- Captain: Leo Carolan

The 1909 St. Mary's (Ohio) football team represented St. Mary's College as an independent during the 1909 college football season. In its first and only season under head coach George Binlein, the team compiled a 4–3 record.

=== Schedule ===
Date	Opponent	Site	Result
	Central Athletic Club		L 5–6
	Cedarville		W 25–6
	Steele		L 11–18
	Deaf Mutes		W 11–6
	Earlham		L 0–55
	St. Patrick's		W 6–2
	Xavier		W 12–0
