= 1905 Virginia Orange and Blue football team =

American college football season

1905 Virginia Orange and Blue football
- Conference: Independent
- Record: 6–4
- Head coach: William C. "King" Cole (1st season)
- Captain: Merritt Cooke Jr.
- Home stadium: Madison Hall Field

1905 Southern college football independents records
	Conf.			Overall
Team	W	L	T	W		L		T
Tusculum		–		1	–	0	–	0
Stetson		–		4	–	0	–	1
VPI		–		9	–	1	–	0
Navy		–		10	–	1	–	1
Grant		–		6	–	1	–	0
Kentucky University		–		7	–	0	–	3
Oklahoma		–		7	–	2	–	0
Washington and Lee		–		7	–	2	–	0
Texas A&M		–		7	–	2	–	0
Marshall		–		6	–	2	–	0
North Carolina A&M		–		4	–	1	–	1
West Virginia		–		6	–	3	–	0
Kentucky State College		–		6	–	3	–	1
South Carolina		–		4	–	2	–	1
Maryland		–		6	–	4	–	0
Central State Normal		–		4	–	3	–	1
North Carolina		–		4	–	3	–	1
Virginia		–		5	–	4	–	0
Catholic University		–		0	–	0	–	1
TCU		–		4	–	4	–	0
Delaware		–		3	–	4	–	1
The Citadel		–		2	–	3	–	1
Richmond		–		3	–	5	–	2
George Washington		–		3	–	4	–	2
Davidson		–		3	–	4	–	0
Howard (AL)		–		1	–	2	–	1
VMI		–		2	–	5	–	1
Oklahoma A&M		–		1	–	4	–	2
Arkansas		–		2	–	6	–	0
Kendall		–		1	–	3	–	0
Georgetown		–		2	–	7	–	0
Goldey College		–		1	–	4	–	0
Baylor		–		1	–	6	–	0
Louisiana Industrial		–		0	–	1	–	0

The 1905 Virginia Orange and Blue football team represented the University of Virginia as an independent during the 1905 college football season. Led by first-year head coach William C. "King" Cole, the Orange and Blue compiled a record of 6–4.

== Schedule ==
Date	Time	Opponent	Site	Result	Attendance	Source
September 27		Randolph–Macon	Madison Hall Field; Charlottesville, VA	W 59–0		
September 30		St. John's (MD)	Madison Hall Field; Charlottesville, VA	W 30–5		
October 7		North Carolina A&M	Madison Hall Field; Charlottesville, VA	W 10–0		
October 14		vs. Carlisle	Broad Street Park; Richmond, VA	L 0–12	8,000	
October 21	3:00 p.m.	vs. Bucknell	Lafayette Field; Norfolk, VA	W 15–11	2,500	
October 27		Davidson	Madison Hall Field; Charlottesville, VA	W 11–0		
November 4	3:00 p.m.	VPI	Madison Hall Field; Charlottesville, VA (rivalry)	L 0–11		
November 11		at George Washington	American League Park; Washington, DC	W 55–0		
November 18		at Navy	Worden Field; Annapolis, MD	L 0–22		
November 30	2:30 p.m.	vs. North Carolina	Lafayette Field; Norfolk, VA (South's Oldest Rivalry)	L 0–17	12,000	
