= 1905 VPI football team =

American college football season

1905 VPI football

Southern champion
- Conference: Independent
- Record: 9–1
- Head coach: Sally Miles (1st season)
- Captain: Thomas Walker Lewis
- Home stadium: Gibboney Field

1905 Southern college football independents records
	Conf.			Overall
Team	W	L	T	W		L		T
Tusculum		–		1	–	0	–	0
Stetson		–		4	–	0	–	1
VPI		–		9	–	1	–	0
Navy		–		10	–	1	–	1
Grant		–		6	–	1	–	0
Kentucky University		–		7	–	0	–	3
Oklahoma		–		7	–	2	–	0
Washington and Lee		–		7	–	2	–	0
Texas A&M		–		7	–	2	–	0
Marshall		–		6	–	2	–	0
North Carolina A&M		–		4	–	1	–	1
West Virginia		–		6	–	3	–	0
Kentucky State College		–		6	–	3	–	1
South Carolina		–		4	–	2	–	1
Maryland		–		6	–	4	–	0
Central State Normal		–		4	–	3	–	1
North Carolina		–		4	–	3	–	1
Virginia		–		5	–	4	–	0
Catholic University		–		0	–	0	–	1
TCU		–		4	–	4	–	0
Delaware		–		3	–	4	–	1
The Citadel		–		2	–	3	–	1
Richmond		–		3	–	5	–	2
George Washington		–		3	–	4	–	2
Davidson		–		3	–	4	–	0
Howard (AL)		–		1	–	2	–	1
VMI		–		2	–	5	–	1
Oklahoma A&M		–		1	–	4	–	2
Arkansas		–		2	–	6	–	0
Kendall		–		1	–	3	–	0
Georgetown		–		2	–	7	–	0
Goldey College		–		1	–	4	–	0
Baylor		–		1	–	6	–	0
Louisiana Industrial		–		0	–	1	–	0

The 1905 VPI football team represented the Virginia Polytechnic Institute in the 1905 college football season. Led by first-year head coach Sally Miles, the team went 9–1 and claims a Southern championship. The team had the most wins in a Virginia Tech season for many years to come, and defeated rival Virginia for the first time. Tech outscored its opponents 305 to 24. Hunter Carpenter scored 82 of those points.

== Schedule ==
Date	Time	Opponent	Site	Result	Attendance	Source
September 30		Roanoke	Gibboney Field; Blacksburg, VA	W 86–0		
October 6	5:10 p.m.	Cumberland (TN)	Gibboney Field; Blacksburg, VA	W 12–0		
October 14		at Army	The Plain; West Point, NY	W 16–6		
October 21	2:40 p.m.	Gallaudet	Gibboney Field; Blacksburg, VA	W 56–0		
October 28	3:00 p.m.	vs. North Carolina	Broad Street Park; Richmond, VA	W 35–6	4,500	
November 4	3:00 p.m.	at Virginia	Madison Hall Field; Charlottesville, VA (rivalry)	W 11–0	2,000	
November 11		Washington and Lee	Gibboney Field; Blacksburg, VA	W 15–0		
November 18	3:30 p.m.	vs. South Carolina	Fair Grounds; Roanoke, VA	W 34–0	1,200-2,000	
November 25		at Navy	Worden Field; Annapolis, MD	L 6–12		
November 30		vs. VMI	Richmond, VA (rivalry)	W 34–0	5,000	

== Before the season ==
The team reported for practice on September 1. "Never in the history of the school have prospects for a winning team been so bright."

== Game summaries ==
=== Roanoke ===
Roanoke vs. VPI

Team	1	2	Total
Roanoke	0	0	0
• VPI	52	34	86

- Date: September 30, 1905
- Location: Gibboney Field
  Blacksburg, VA
- Referee: Vawter

The season opened with an 86–0 defeat of Roanoke.

The starting lineup for VPI was: Shuey (left end), Stickling (left tackle), Cunningham (left guard), Johnson (center), Walker (right guard), Lewis (right tackle), Squires (right end), Harris (quarterback), Treadwell (left halfback), Connor (right halfback), Harlan (fullback). The substitutes were: Adams, Branch, Cahill, Diffendal, Furstein, Grant, Hanvey, Hildebrand, Noland, Rogers, Sanfort, Stiles and Varner.

The starting lineup for Roanoke was: Moss (left end), Shannon (left tackle), John Link (left guard), Arthur Obenschain (center), W. Engleby (right guard), Cale (right tackle), Kelley (right end), F. M. Darnell (quarterback), Frank Hansbarger (left halfback), Steele (right halfback), Charles Grove (fullback). The substitutes were: W. H. Cline.

=== Cumberland ===
Cumberland vs. VPI

Team	1	2	Total
Cumberland	0	0	0
• VPI	6	6	12

- Date: October 6, 1905
- Location: Gibboney Field
  Blacksburg, VA
- Game start: 5:10 p.m.
- Referee: Miles

After their victory over Roanoke, VPI played Cumberland University at Gibboney Field.

The starting lineup for VPI was: Shuey (left end), Willson (left tackle), Cunningham (left guard), Stiles (center), Stickling (right guard), Lewis (right tackle), Squires (right end), Harris (quarterback), Treadwell (left halfback), Hanvey (right halfback), Harlan (fullback).

The starting lineup for Cumberland was: Gill (left end), B. L. Rice (left tackle), Denston (left guard), Red Smith (center), Smith (right guard), D. P. Wimberley (right tackle), Roma G. White (right end), Stewart (quarterback), J .C. Anderson (left halfback), Miller (right halfback), E. L. Minton (fullback).

=== Army ===
VPI at Army

Team	1	2	Total
• VPI	16	0	16
Army	0	6	6

- Date: October 14, 1905
- Location: The Plain
  West Point, NY

The upset of the week was VPI's 16–6 win over Army. Carpenter was the star of the game, and made a kick from placement.

The starting lineup for VPI was: Webber (left end), Willson (left tackle), Diffendal (left guard), Stiles (center), Stickling (right guard), Hines (right tackle), Lewis (right end), Nutter (quarterback), Treadwell (left halfback), Carpenter (right halfback), Harlan (fullback). The substitutes were: Harris and Varner.

The starting lineup for Army was: Ellis (left end), Wallace Philoon (left tackle), Moss (left guard), Clyde Abraham (center), William Christy (right guard), Charles Mettler (right tackle), Alexander Garfield Gillespie (right end), Enoch Garey (quarterback), Edwin Greble (left halfback), Hill (right halfback), Henry Torney (fullback). The substitutes were: Martyn Shute.

=== Gallaudet ===
Gallaudet at VPI

Team	1	2	Total
Gallaudet	0	0	0
• VPI	41	15	56

- Date: October 22, 1905
- Location: Gibboney Field
  Blacksburg, VA
- Game start: 2:40 p.m.

VPI "had no trouble" in beating Gallaudet 56–0.

The starting lineup for VPI was: Webber (left end), Wilson (left tackle), Cunningham (left guard), Stiles (center), Stickling (right guard), Hynes (right tackle), Lewis (right end), Harris (quarterback), Nutter (left halfback), Carpenter (right halfback), Harlan (fullback). The substitutes were: Branch, Cox, Diffendal, Grant, Hanvey, Johnson, Shuey, Squires, Varner and Walker.

The starting lineup for Gallaudet was: Dan Reichard (left end), Sharp (left tackle), Odie Underhill (left guard), Busch (center), John Chandler (right guard), Frank Mikesell (right tackle), Russell (right end), Arthur Hinch (quarterback), Frank Horton (left halfback), Majure (right halfback), John McCandless (fullback). The substitutes were: Philip Caldwell, Early Elder, Chester Erwin and Alvin Kutzleb.

=== North Carolina ===
North Carolina vs. VPI

Team	1	2	Total
UNC	6	0	6
• VPI	11	24	35

- Date: October 5, 1905
- Location: Broad Street Park
  Richmond, VA
- Game start: 3:00 p.m.
- Game attendance: 4,500
- Game weather: "good"
- Referee: Williams (UVA)

VPI defeated North Carolina 35–6. Carpenter made "several sensational runs." During the second half VPI "scored almost at will."

The starting lineup for VPI was: Webber (left end), Willson (left tackle), Cunningham (left guard), Stiles (center), Stickling (right guard), Hynes (right tackle), Lewis (right end), Harris (quarterback), Nutter (left halfback), Carpenter (right halfback), Harlan (fullback). The substitutes were: Cox, Diffendal and Hanvey.

The starting lineup for North Carolina was: Newman Townsend (left end), Meadows (left tackle), Williams (left guard), Edgar Snipes (center), Perry Seagle (right guard), Romy Story (right tackle), Ferdinand Whitaker (right end), Foy Roberson (quarterback), Harvey Snipes (left halfback), Robert Reynolds (right halfback), LeRoy Abernethy (fullback). The substitutes were: Lucius Dunlap, Wiley Pittman, Thompson, John Winborne and Wright.

=== Virginia ===
VPI at Virginia

Team	1	2	Total
• VPI	6	5	11
Virginia	0	0	0

- Date: November 4, 1905
- Location: Madison Hall Field
  Charlottesville, VA
- Game start: 3:00 p. m.
- Game attendance: 2,000
- Referee: Gresham Poe

Hunter Carpenter had returned to VPI in 1905 for a last shot at beating Virginia in his eighth year of college football. Going into the game, UVA was 8–0 against VPI by a cumulative score of 170–5. The Cavalier Daily ran a story outlining Carpenter's motives and move from VPI to UNC and back to VPI over the preceding eight years. Virginia accused Carpenter of being a professional player, as he had played college football already for nearly a decade. Carpenter signed an affidavit that he had not received payment to play against UVA and played against a backdrop of recrimination.

Hunter Carpenter

Virginia fumbled at midfield, and as a result Carpenter eventually got away for a 30-yard gain around left end. Virginia held VPI on downs at the 3-yard line. Virginia's punt had to go high and short to avoid hitting the goal post. Carpenter called a fair catch in order for a free kick, but was tackled anyway, and the penalty brought the ball back to Virginia's 3-yard line. On third down, Murray Harlan skirted end for a touchdown, and Carpenter added the extra point.

"The second half was even more hotly contested than the first." Carpenter "finally" got off a long punt, down to Virginia's 5-yard line. VPI blocked Virginia's ensuing punt, and on third down Carpenter dashed through left tackle for the final score. Carpenter was later ejected for throwing the ball at the face of a Virginia defender, but stayed on the sidelines to watch as neither team was able to score against each other. Carpenter left immediately after the game and moved to Middleton, New York, never to return to the Commonwealth. Carpenter retired 1–7 against UVA, but Virginia still refused to play VPI again until 1923.

The starting lineup for VPI was: Webber (left end), Willson (left tackle), Cunningham (left guard), Stiles (center), Stickling (right guard), Hynes (right tackle), Lewis (right end), Nutter (quarterback), Treadwell (left halfback), Carpenter (right halfback), Harlan (fullback). The substitutes were: Diffendal, Hanvey and Harris.

The starting lineup for Virginia was: Edward Dodson (left end), Charles Haskell (left tackle), Alexander Garnett (left guard), George Kite (center), Terrence Murphy (right guard), Merritt Cooke Jr. (right tackle), James E. Barry (right end), Oscar Randolph (quarterback), Joseph Waples (left halfback), Edward Johnson (right halfback), Henry Maddux (fullback). The substitutes were: Burke, Crebs, Dangerfield and Hopkins.

=== Washington and Lee ===
Washington & Lee vs. VPI

Team	1	2	Total
W&L	0	0	0
• VPI	9	6	15

- Date: November 11, 1905
- Location: Gibboney Field
  Blacksburg, VA
- Referee: Miles

The starting lineup for VPI was: Webber (left end), Diffendal (left tackle), Cunningham (left guard), Johnson (center), Stickling (right guard), Hynes (right tackle), Lewis (right end), Nutter (quarterback), Treadwell (left halfback), Hanvey (right halfback), Harlan (fullback). The substitutes were: Cox and Harris.

The starting lineup for Washington & Lee was: E. L. Alderson (left end), Emmett Rankin (left tackle), H. M. White (left guard), A. I. Miller (center), H. M. Dow (right guard), H. W. Withers (right tackle), Oliver (right end), M. Rasin (quarterback), Thomas Bagley (left halfback), J. L. Anderson (right halfback), H. M. Moomaw (fullback). The substitutes were: J. W. Russell.

=== South Carolina ===
South Carolina vs. VPI

Team	1	2	Total
South Carolina	0	0	0
• VPI	28	6	34

- Date: November 18, 1905
- Location: Fair Grounds
  Roanoke, VA
- Game start: 3:30 p.m.
- Game attendance: 1,200-2,000
- Referee: Conner (Roanoke)

VPI beat South Carolina 34–0. Captain Lewis asked for the game to be called after eight minutes' play in the second half, as the crowd surged on the field and play was impossible. South Carolina did not earn a single first down. Carpenter had one run of 68 yards.

The starting lineup for VPI was: Webber (left end), Willson (left tackle), Cunningham (left guard), Tomson (center), Stickling (right guard), Hynes (right tackle), Lewis (right end), Harris (quarterback), Nutter (left halfback), Carpenter (right halfback), Hanvey (fullback). The substitutes were: Cox, Fuenstein, Hildebrand and Varner.

The starting lineup for South Carolina was: Ralph Foster (left end), S. H. Wilds (left tackle), Paul Moore (left guard), William Fendley (center), Thomas Sligh (right guard), Edward Croft (right tackle), Douglas McKay (right end), Homer Holmes (quarterback), Gene Oliver (left halfback), John Wilds (right halfback), Tristam Hyde (fullback).

=== Navy ===
VPI at Navy

Team	1	2	Total
VPI	0	6	6
• Navy	6	6	12

- Date: November 25, 1905
- Location: Worden Field
  Annapolis, MD
- Referee: Gresham Poe

VPI suffered its sole loss of the season against Navy, getting revenge for when Carpenter and VPI won in 1903. VPI scored when Carpenter returned the second-half kickoff 95 yards, after a hand-off from Murray Harlan who caught the kick.

The starting lineup for VPI was: Webber (left end), Willson (left tackle), Cunningham (left guard), Stiles (center), Stickling (right guard), Hynes (right tackle), Lewis (right end), Harris (quarterback), Nutter (left halfback), Carpenter (right halfback), Harlan (fullback). The substitutes were: Diffendal and Hanvey.

The starting lineup for Navy was: Douglas Howard (left end), Percy Northcroft (left tackle), Joseph O'Brien (left guard), Lewis Causey (center), John Shafroth (right guard), Ronan Grady (right tackle), Edwin Woodworth (right end), Walter Decker (quarterback), Herbert Spencer (left halfback), Stephen Doherty (right halfback), Robert Ghormley (fullback). The substitutes were: A. H. Douglas, Homer Norton and Leo Welch.

=== VMI ===
VMI vs. VPI

Team	1	2	Total
VMI	0	0	0
• VPI	22	12	34

- Date: November 30, 1905
- Location: Richmond, VA
- Game attendance: 5,000
- Game weather: "chill blasts of a nor'wester"
- Referee: Gresham Poe

The season closed with a 34–0 win over old rival VMI. "The story of the contest may be summed up in the statement that the Lexington boys were outclassed." The crowd did not exceed 5,000 due to the cold weather. Byrd, Fraser, Harlan, and Beckner were all injured. Nutter, Cox, Harvey, and Harlan starred.

The starting lineup for VPI was: Webber (left end), Diffendal (left tackle), Cunningham (left guard), Stiles (center), Stickling (right guard), Hynes (right tackle), Lewis (right end), Nutter (quarterback), Cox (left halfback), Hanvey (right halfback), Harlan (fullback).

The starting lineup for VMI was: Alexander Fraser (left end), Oscar Thraves (left tackle), William Montgomery (left guard), Edward Hancock (center), Alphonse Stude (right guard), William Riley (right tackle), William Poague (right end), Byrd (quarterback), Mahlon Caffee (left halfback), William Beckner (right halfback), Robert Massie (fullback).

== Postseason ==
Six players made W&L coach R. R. Brown's All-Southern team.

== Players ==
The following players were members of the 1905 football team according to the roster published in the 1906 edition of The Bugle, the Virginia Tech yearbook.

VPI 1905 roster
Quarterback: James Arthur Nutter; Guards: George Hamilton Cunningham; Frank Henry Stickling; Tackles: Bernard Daxon Hynes; George Cralle Willson; Center: Joseph Clay Stiles	Ends: Thomas Walker Lewis (Capt.); W. S. Webber; Halfbacks: Hunter Carpenter; Harry A. Treadwell; Fullback: Murray Valentine Harlan	Substitutes: William Lewis Branch; Leonard Ballard Cox; Charles Edward Diffendal; William Heyser Feuerstein; Albert Weston Grant; Conner V. Hanvey; Edwin Rollins Harris; Clarence K. Hildebrand; Allen Burnley Johnson; Ewing Waters Lawson; Philip McGregor Shuey; Squires; Tomson; Harry Varner; Walker

== Coaching and training staff ==
- Head coach: Sally Miles
- Manager: Alpheus Daniel Williams
- Assistant manager: Edgar Seymour Sheppard
