= 1905 Maryland Aggies football team =

American college football season

1905 Maryland Aggies football
- Conference: Independent
- Record: 6–4
- Head coach: Fred K. Nielsen (1st season)
- Home stadium: Maryland Agricultural College Field

1905 Southern college football independents records
	Conf.			Overall
Team	W	L	T	W		L		T
Tusculum		–		1	–	0	–	0
Stetson		–		4	–	0	–	1
VPI		–		9	–	1	–	0
Navy		–		10	–	1	–	1
Grant		–		6	–	1	–	0
Kentucky University		–		7	–	0	–	3
Oklahoma		–		7	–	2	–	0
Washington and Lee		–		7	–	2	–	0
Texas A&M		–		7	–	2	–	0
Marshall		–		6	–	2	–	0
North Carolina A&M		–		4	–	1	–	1
West Virginia		–		6	–	3	–	0
Kentucky State College		–		6	–	3	–	1
South Carolina		–		4	–	2	–	1
Maryland		–		6	–	4	–	0
Central State Normal		–		4	–	3	–	1
North Carolina		–		4	–	3	–	1
Virginia		–		5	–	4	–	0
Catholic University		–		0	–	0	–	1
TCU		–		4	–	4	–	0
Delaware		–		3	–	4	–	1
The Citadel		–		2	–	3	–	1
Richmond		–		3	–	5	–	2
George Washington		–		3	–	4	–	2
Davidson		–		3	–	4	–	0
Howard (AL)		–		1	–	2	–	1
VMI		–		2	–	5	–	1
Oklahoma A&M		–		1	–	4	–	2
Arkansas		–		2	–	6	–	0
Kendall		–		1	–	3	–	0
Georgetown		–		2	–	7	–	0
Goldey College		–		1	–	4	–	0
Baylor		–		1	–	6	–	0
Louisiana Industrial		–		0	–	1	–	0

The 1905 Maryland Aggies football team represented Maryland Agricultural College (later part of the University of Maryland) in the 1905 college football season. In their first season under head coach Fred K. Nielsen, the Aggies compiled a 6–4 record and were outscored by all opponents, 131 to 66. Coach Nielsen had a full-time job with the State Department while coaching football. Curley Byrd, who went on to be Maryland's head coach from 1911 to 1934 and its university president from 1936 to 1954, played on the 1905 team.

== Schedule ==
Date	Opponent	Site	Result	Source
October 7	Baltimore Polytechnic Institute	College Park, MD	W 20–0	
October 14	Gallaudet	College Park, MD	W 16–0	
October 21	Western Maryland	College Park, MD	L 0–10	
October 25	at Navy	Worden Field; Annapolis, MD	L 0–17	
October 28	Mount St. Joseph's (MD)	College Park, MD	W 28–0	
November 4	at William & Mary	Williamsburg, VA	W 17–0	
November 11	St. John's (MD)	College Park, MD	W 27–5	
November 18	at Washington College	Chestertown, MD	L 0–17	
November 25	University of Maryland, Baltimore	College Park, MD	W 23–5	
November 30	at Delaware	Athletic Field; Newark, DE	L 0–12	
