= 1905 Arkansas Cardinals football team =

American college football season

1905 Arkansas Cardinals football
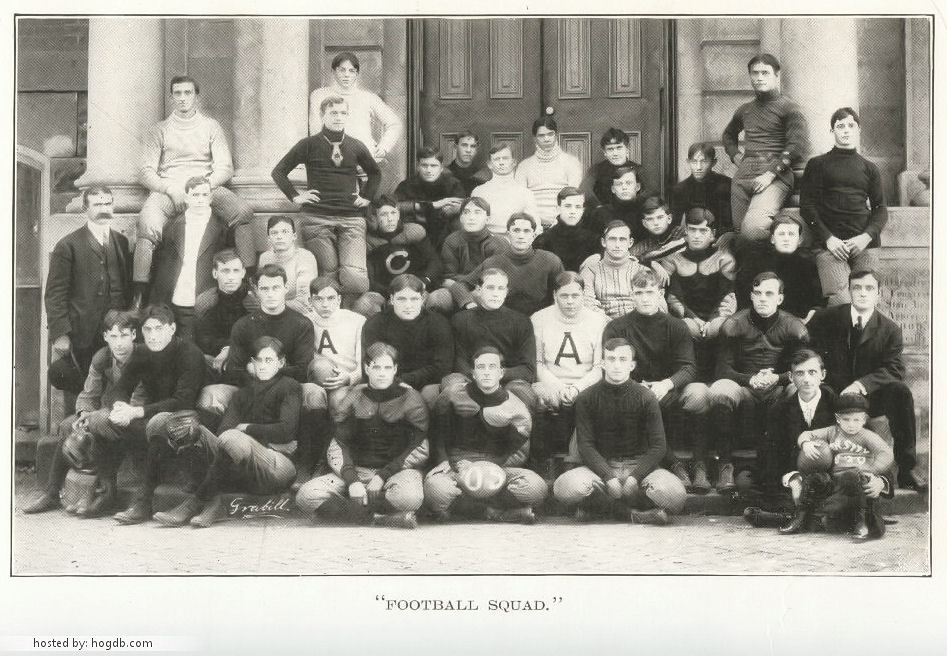
- 1905 Arkansas Cardinals team photo
- Conference: Independent
- Record: 2–6
- Head coach: Ancil D. Brown (2nd season)
- Captain: William Jett
- Home stadium: The Hill

1905 Southern college football independents records
	Conf.			Overall
Team	W	L	T	W		L		T
Tusculum		–		1	–	0	–	0
Stetson		–		4	–	0	–	1
VPI		–		9	–	1	–	0
Navy		–		10	–	1	–	1
Grant		–		6	–	1	–	0
Kentucky University		–		7	–	0	–	3
Oklahoma		–		7	–	2	–	0
Washington and Lee		–		7	–	2	–	0
Texas A&M		–		7	–	2	–	0
Marshall		–		6	–	2	–	0
North Carolina A&M		–		4	–	1	–	1
West Virginia		–		6	–	3	–	0
Kentucky State College		–		6	–	3	–	1
South Carolina		–		4	–	2	–	1
Maryland		–		6	–	4	–	0
Central State Normal		–		4	–	3	–	1
North Carolina		–		4	–	3	–	1
Virginia		–		5	–	4	–	0
Catholic University		–		0	–	0	–	1
TCU		–		4	–	4	–	0
Delaware		–		3	–	4	–	1
The Citadel		–		2	–	3	–	1
Richmond		–		3	–	5	–	2
George Washington		–		3	–	4	–	2
Davidson		–		3	–	4	–	0
Howard (AL)		–		1	–	2	–	1
VMI		–		2	–	5	–	1
Oklahoma A&M		–		1	–	4	–	2
Arkansas		–		2	–	6	–	0
Kendall		–		1	–	3	–	0
Georgetown		–		2	–	7	–	0
Goldey College		–		1	–	4	–	0
Baylor		–		1	–	6	–	0
Louisiana Industrial		–		0	–	1	–	0

The 1905 Arkansas Cardinals football team represented the University of Arkansas during the 1905 college football season. In their second and final season under head coach Ancil D. Brown, the Razorbacks compiled a 2–6 record and were outscored by their opponents by a combined total of 50 to 32.

At the outset, the University of Arkansas being known as the "Arkansas Cardinals" is in all likelihood a misnomer. The "cardinal" referred to the color cardinal and not the red bird. Moreover, as early as the first game of the 1905 season, news media reports specifically refer to the University of Arkansas football team as the "Razorbacks", pre-dating the University of Arkansas' official statement regarding how the University of Arkansas became the Razorbacks.

== Schedule ==
Date	Time	Opponent	Site	Result	Attendance	Source
October 7		Kansas	The Hill; Fayetteville, AR	L 0–6		
October 14	3:00 p.m.	at Washington University	Washington University Stadium; St. Louis, MO	L 0–6		
October 16		at Drury	Springfield, MO	L 0–12		
October 25		Chilocco	The Hill; Fayetteville, AR	W 6–0		
October 31		Texas	The Hill; Fayetteville, AR (rivalry)	L 0–4		
November 13		Kentucky University	The Hill; Fayetteville, AR	L 0–6	1,000	
November 18		at Missouri Mines	Athletic Park; Rolla, MO	L 0–16		
November 30		Kansas City Medics	The Hill; Fayetteville, AR	W 26–0		
