= 1905 Davidson football team =

American college football season

1905 Davidson football
- Conference: Independent
- Record: 3–4
- Head coach: Bob Williams (2nd season)
- Home stadium: Sprunt Athletic Field

1905 Southern college football independents records
	Conf.			Overall
Team	W	L	T	W		L		T
Tusculum		–		1	–	0	–	0
Stetson		–		4	–	0	–	1
VPI		–		9	–	1	–	0
Navy		–		10	–	1	–	1
Grant		–		6	–	1	–	0
Kentucky University		–		7	–	0	–	3
Oklahoma		–		7	–	2	–	0
Washington and Lee		–		7	–	2	–	0
Texas A&M		–		7	–	2	–	0
Marshall		–		6	–	2	–	0
North Carolina A&M		–		4	–	1	–	1
West Virginia		–		6	–	3	–	0
Kentucky State College		–		6	–	3	–	1
South Carolina		–		4	–	2	–	1
Maryland		–		6	–	4	–	0
Central State Normal		–		4	–	3	–	1
North Carolina		–		4	–	3	–	1
Virginia		–		5	–	4	–	0
Catholic University		–		0	–	0	–	1
TCU		–		4	–	4	–	0
Delaware		–		3	–	4	–	1
The Citadel		–		2	–	3	–	1
Richmond		–		3	–	5	–	2
George Washington		–		3	–	4	–	2
Davidson		–		3	–	4	–	0
Howard (AL)		–		1	–	2	–	1
VMI		–		2	–	5	–	1
Oklahoma A&M		–		1	–	4	–	2
Arkansas		–		2	–	6	–	0
Kendall		–		1	–	3	–	0
Georgetown		–		2	–	7	–	0
Goldey College		–		1	–	4	–	0
Baylor		–		1	–	6	–	0
Louisiana Industrial		–		0	–	1	–	0

The 1905 Davidson football team was an American football team that represented the Davidson College as an independent during the 1905 college football season. In their second year, under head coach Bob Williams, the team compiled a 3–4 record.

== Schedule ==
Date	Opponent	Site	Result	Attendance	Source
October 7	vs. North Carolina	Mecklenburg Fair Grounds; Charlotte, NC	L 0–6	1,000	
October 16	Oak Ridge Institute	Sprunt Athletic Field; Davidson, NC	W 75–0		
October 20	at Auburn	West End Park; Birmingham, AL	W 6–0		
October 27	at Virginia	Madison Hall Field; Charlottesville, VA	L 0–11		
November 4	vs. South Carolina	Mecklenburg Fair Grounds; Charlotte, NC	L 5–7		
November 10	at VMI	Lexington, VA	W 8–6		
November 30	vs. North Carolina A&M	Fairview Park; Winston-Salem, NC	L 0–10		
