= 1905 Georgetown Blue and Gray football team =

American college football season

1905 Georgetown Blue and Gray football
- Conference: Independent
- Record: 2–7
- Head coach: Joe Reilly (2nd season)
- Captain: Leo Fitzpatrick
- Home stadium: Georgetown Field

1905 Southern college football independents records
	Conf.			Overall
Team	W	L	T	W		L		T
Tusculum		–		1	–	0	–	0
Stetson		–		4	–	0	–	1
VPI		–		9	–	1	–	0
Navy		–		10	–	1	–	1
Grant		–		6	–	1	–	0
Kentucky University		–		7	–	0	–	3
Oklahoma		–		7	–	2	–	0
Washington and Lee		–		7	–	2	–	0
Texas A&M		–		7	–	2	–	0
Marshall		–		6	–	2	–	0
North Carolina A&M		–		4	–	1	–	1
West Virginia		–		6	–	3	–	0
Kentucky State College		–		6	–	3	–	1
South Carolina		–		4	–	2	–	1
Maryland		–		6	–	4	–	0
Central State Normal		–		4	–	3	–	1
North Carolina		–		4	–	3	–	1
Virginia		–		5	–	4	–	0
Catholic University		–		0	–	0	–	1
TCU		–		4	–	4	–	0
Delaware		–		3	–	4	–	1
The Citadel		–		2	–	3	–	1
Richmond		–		3	–	5	–	2
George Washington		–		3	–	4	–	2
Davidson		–		3	–	4	–	0
Howard (AL)		–		1	–	2	–	1
VMI		–		2	–	5	–	1
Oklahoma A&M		–		1	–	4	–	2
Arkansas		–		2	–	6	–	0
Kendall		–		1	–	3	–	0
Georgetown		–		2	–	7	–	0
Goldey College		–		1	–	4	–	0
Baylor		–		1	–	6	–	0
Louisiana Industrial		–		0	–	1	–	0

The 1905 Georgetown Blue and Gray football team represented Georgetown University during the 1905 college football season. Led by Joe Reilly in his second year as head coach, the team went 2–7.

== Schedule ==
Date	Time	Opponent	Site	Result	Attendance	Source
September 30		Gallaudet	Georgetown Field; Washington, DC	W 10–0		
October 7		at Princeton	University Field; Princeton, NJ	L 0–34		
October 14		Villanova	Georgetown Field; Washington, DC	L 0–6		
October 21		Swarthmore	Georgetown Field; Washington, DC	L 0–28		
October 28		vs. Washington & Jefferson	Friendship Park; Pittsburgh, PA	L 0–27		
November 4	3:00 p.m.	vs. North Carolina	Broad Street Park; Richmond, VA	L 0–36		
November 18		Bucknell	Georgetown Field; Washington, DC	L 0–18		
November 25		George Washington	Georgetown Field; Washington, DC	W 12–6	4,000	
November 30	2:30 p.m.	Carlisle	National Park; Washington, DC	L 0–76	5,000	
