= 1905 William & Mary Orange and White football team =

American college football season

1905 William & Mary Orange and White football
- Conference: Eastern Virginia Intercollegiate Athletic Association
- Record: 2–4–1 (0–2 EVIAA)
- Head coach: J. Merrill Blanchard (2nd season)
- Captain: C. E. Johnson

The 1905 William & Mary Orange and White football team was an American football team that represented the College of William & Mary as a member of the Eastern Virginia Intercollegiate Athletic Association (EVIAA) during the 1905 college football season. Led by J. Merrill Blanchard in his second and final season as head coach, the Orange and White compiled an overall record of 2–4–1.

== Schedule ==
Date	Time	Opponent	Site	Result	Source
September 30		Hampton Athletic Club*	Williamsburg, VA	W 6–0	
October 11	3:30 p.m.	at Richmond*	Broad Street Park; Richmond, VA (rivalry)	T 0–0	
October 21		at Richmond*	Broad Street Park; Richmond, VA	W 4–0	
October 28		at VMI*	Lexington, VA (rivalry)	L 0–23	
November 4		Maryland*	Williamsburg, VA	L 0–17	
November 11	3:30 p.m.	at Richmond	Broad Street Park; Richmond, VA	L 5–23	
November 18	3:30 p.m.	vs. Randolph–Macon	Broad Street Park; Richmond, VA	L 0–27	
*Non-conference game
