= 1905 North Carolina A&M Aggies football team =

American college football season

1905 North Carolina A&M Aggies football
- Conference: Independent
- Record: 4–1–1
- Head coach: George S. Whitney (1st season)

1905 Southern college football independents records
	Conf.			Overall
Team	W	L	T	W		L		T
Tusculum		–		1	–	0	–	0
Stetson		–		4	–	0	–	1
VPI		–		9	–	1	–	0
Navy		–		10	–	1	–	1
Grant		–		6	–	1	–	0
Kentucky University		–		7	–	0	–	3
Oklahoma		–		7	–	2	–	0
Washington and Lee		–		7	–	2	–	0
Texas A&M		–		7	–	2	–	0
Marshall		–		6	–	2	–	0
North Carolina A&M		–		4	–	1	–	1
West Virginia		–		6	–	3	–	0
Kentucky State College		–		6	–	3	–	1
South Carolina		–		4	–	2	–	1
Maryland		–		6	–	4	–	0
Central State Normal		–		4	–	3	–	1
North Carolina		–		4	–	3	–	1
Virginia		–		5	–	4	–	0
Catholic University		–		0	–	0	–	1
TCU		–		4	–	4	–	0
Delaware		–		3	–	4	–	1
The Citadel		–		2	–	3	–	1
Richmond		–		3	–	5	–	2
George Washington		–		3	–	4	–	2
Davidson		–		3	–	4	–	0
Howard (AL)		–		1	–	2	–	1
VMI		–		2	–	5	–	1
Oklahoma A&M		–		1	–	4	–	2
Arkansas		–		2	–	6	–	0
Kendall		–		1	–	3	–	0
Georgetown		–		2	–	7	–	0
Goldey College		–		1	–	4	–	0
Baylor		–		1	–	6	–	0
Louisiana Industrial		–		0	–	1	–	0

The 1905 North Carolina A&M Aggies football team represented the North Carolina College of Agriculture and Mechanic Arts (now known as North Carolina State University) as an independent during the 1905 college football season. In George S. Whitney's first and only season as head coach, the Aggies compiled a record of 4–1–1. They tied North Carolina, the third consecutive draw in the rivalry, and outscored their opponents 66 to 10 .

== Schedule ==
Date	Opponent	Site	Result	Attendance	Source
September 29	at VMI	Lexington, VA	W 5–0		
October 7	at Virginia	Madison Hall Field; Charlottesville, VA	L 0–10		
October 26	at South Carolina	Columbia, SC	W 29–0		
November 11	North Carolina	Raleigh, NC (rivalry)	T 0–0	5,000	
November 18	Washington and Lee	Raleigh, NC	W 22–0		
November 30	vs. Davidson	Fairview Park; Winston-Salem, NC	W 10–0		
