= 1905 North Carolina Tar Heels football team =

American college football season

1905 North Carolina Tar Heels football
- Conference: Independent
- Record: 4–3–1
- Head coach: Bill Warner (1st season)
- Captain: Foy Roberson
- Home stadium: Campus Athletic Field (II)

1905 Southern college football independents records
	Conf.			Overall
Team	W	L	T	W		L		T
Tusculum		–		1	–	0	–	0
Stetson		–		4	–	0	–	1
VPI		–		9	–	1	–	0
Navy		–		10	–	1	–	1
Grant		–		6	–	1	–	0
Kentucky University		–		7	–	0	–	3
Oklahoma		–		7	–	2	–	0
Washington and Lee		–		7	–	2	–	0
Texas A&M		–		7	–	2	–	0
Marshall		–		6	–	2	–	0
North Carolina A&M		–		4	–	1	–	1
West Virginia		–		6	–	3	–	0
Kentucky State College		–		6	–	3	–	1
South Carolina		–		4	–	2	–	1
Maryland		–		6	–	4	–	0
Central State Normal		–		4	–	3	–	1
North Carolina		–		4	–	3	–	1
Virginia		–		5	–	4	–	0
Catholic University		–		0	–	0	–	1
TCU		–		4	–	4	–	0
Delaware		–		3	–	4	–	1
The Citadel		–		2	–	3	–	1
Richmond		–		3	–	5	–	2
George Washington		–		3	–	4	–	2
Davidson		–		3	–	4	–	0
Howard (AL)		–		1	–	2	–	1
VMI		–		2	–	5	–	1
Oklahoma A&M		–		1	–	4	–	2
Arkansas		–		2	–	6	–	0
Kendall		–		1	–	3	–	0
Georgetown		–		2	–	7	–	0
Goldey College		–		1	–	4	–	0
Baylor		–		1	–	6	–	0
Louisiana Industrial		–		0	–	1	–	0

The 1905 North Carolina Tar Heels football team represented the University of North Carolina at Chapel Hill in the 1905 college football season. The team captain for the 1905 season was Foy Roberson.

== Schedule ==
Date	Time	Opponent	Site	Result	Attendance	Source
October 7	3:45 p.m.	vs. Davidson	Latta Park; Charlotte, NC	W 6–0	1,000	
October 14	3:00 p.m.	at Penn	Franklin Field; Philadelphia, PA	L 0–17		
October 21		at Navy	Worden Field; Annapolis, MD	L 0–38		
October 28	3:06 p.m.	vs. VPI	Broad Street Park (I); Richmond, VA	L 6–35	4,500	
November 4	3:00 p.m.	vs. Georgetown	Broad Street Park (I); Richmond, VA	W 36–0		
November 11	3:20 p.m.	at North Carolina A&M	State Fairgrounds (II); Raleigh, NC (rivalry)	T 0–0	5,000	
November 18	2:30 p.m.	vs. VMI	Fairview Park; Winston-Salem, NC	W 17–0		
November 30	2:30 p.m.	vs. Virginia	Lafayette Field; Norfolk, VA (South's Oldest Rivalry)	W 17–0	12,000	
