= 1905 Oklahoma Sooners football team =

American college football season

1905 Oklahoma Sooners football
- Conference: Independent
- Record: 7–2
- Head coach: Bennie Owen (1st season)
- Captain: Byron McCreary
- Home stadium: Boyd Field

1905 Southern college football independents records
	Conf.			Overall
Team	W	L	T	W		L		T
Tusculum		–		1	–	0	–	0
Stetson		–		4	–	0	–	1
VPI		–		9	–	1	–	0
Navy		–		10	–	1	–	1
Grant		–		6	–	1	–	0
Kentucky University		–		7	–	0	–	3
Oklahoma		–		7	–	2	–	0
Washington and Lee		–		7	–	2	–	0
Texas A&M		–		7	–	2	–	0
Marshall		–		6	–	2	–	0
North Carolina A&M		–		4	–	1	–	1
West Virginia		–		6	–	3	–	0
Kentucky State College		–		6	–	3	–	1
South Carolina		–		4	–	2	–	1
Maryland		–		6	–	4	–	0
Central State Normal		–		4	–	3	–	1
North Carolina		–		4	–	3	–	1
Virginia		–		5	–	4	–	0
Catholic University		–		0	–	0	–	1
TCU		–		4	–	4	–	0
Delaware		–		3	–	4	–	1
The Citadel		–		2	–	3	–	1
Richmond		–		3	–	5	–	2
George Washington		–		3	–	4	–	2
Davidson		–		3	–	4	–	0
Howard (AL)		–		1	–	2	–	1
VMI		–		2	–	5	–	1
Oklahoma A&M		–		1	–	4	–	2
Arkansas		–		2	–	6	–	0
Kendall		–		1	–	3	–	0
Georgetown		–		2	–	7	–	0
Goldey College		–		1	–	4	–	0
Baylor		–		1	–	6	–	0
Louisiana Industrial		–		0	–	1	–	0

The 1905 Oklahoma Sooners football team represented the University of Oklahoma as an independent during the 1905 college football season. In their first year under head coach Bennie Owen, the Sooners compiled a 7–2 record, and outscored their opponents by a combined total of 229 to 59. This was first year that the Sooners defeated the Texas Longhorns.

== Schedule ==
Date	Time	Opponent	Site	Result	Attendance	Source
September 30		Central State Normal	Boyd Field; Norman, Oklahoma Territory	W 28–0		
October 16		Haskell	Boyd Field; Norman, Oklahoma Territory	W 18–12		
October 21		at Kansas	McCook Field; Lawrence, KS	L 0–34	1,500	
October 25		at Kansas City Medics	Association Park; Kansas City, MO	W 33–0		
October 28		at Washburn	Topeka, KS	L 6–9	1,200–1,500	
November 3	3:30 p.m.	vs. Texas	Colcord Park; Oklahoma City, Oklahoma Territory (rivalry)	W 2–0	2,500	
November 11		at Kingfisher	Kingfisher, Oklahoma Territory	W 55–0		
November 18		at Central State (OK)	Edmond, Oklahoma Territory	W 58–0		
November 30		vs. Bethany (KS)	Sportsmans' Park; Oklahoma City, Oklahoma Territory	W 29–0		
