= 1905 Navy Midshipmen football team =

American college football season

1905 Navy Midshipmen football
- Conference: Independent
- Record: 10–1–1
- Head coach: Paul Dashiell (2nd season)
- Captain: Douglas Legate Howard
- Home stadium: Worden Field

1905 Southern college football independents records
	Conf.			Overall
Team	W	L	T	W		L		T
Tusculum		–		1	–	0	–	0
Stetson		–		4	–	0	–	1
VPI		–		9	–	1	–	0
Navy		–		10	–	1	–	1
Grant		–		6	–	1	–	0
Kentucky University		–		7	–	0	–	3
Oklahoma		–		7	–	2	–	0
Washington and Lee		–		7	–	2	–	0
Texas A&M		–		7	–	2	–	0
Marshall		–		6	–	2	–	0
North Carolina A&M		–		4	–	1	–	1
West Virginia		–		6	–	3	–	0
Kentucky State College		–		6	–	3	–	1
South Carolina		–		4	–	2	–	1
Maryland		–		6	–	4	–	0
Central State Normal		–		4	–	3	–	1
North Carolina		–		4	–	3	–	1
Virginia		–		5	–	4	–	0
Catholic University		–		0	–	0	–	1
TCU		–		4	–	4	–	0
Delaware		–		3	–	4	–	1
The Citadel		–		2	–	3	–	1
Richmond		–		3	–	5	–	2
George Washington		–		3	–	4	–	2
Davidson		–		3	–	4	–	0
Howard (AL)		–		1	–	2	–	1
VMI		–		2	–	5	–	1
Oklahoma A&M		–		1	–	4	–	2
Arkansas		–		2	–	6	–	0
Kendall		–		1	–	3	–	0
Georgetown		–		2	–	7	–	0
Goldey College		–		1	–	4	–	0
Baylor		–		1	–	6	–	0
Louisiana Industrial		–		0	–	1	–	0

The 1905 Navy Midshipmen football team represented the United States Naval Academy during the 1905 college football season. In their second season under head coach Paul Dashiell, the Midshipmen compiled a record of 10–1–1, shut out eight opponents, and outscored all opponents by a combined score of 243 to 23.

== Schedule ==
Date	Opponent	Site	Result	Source
October 7	VMI	Worden Field; Annapolis, MD	W 34–0	
October 11	St. John's (MD)	Worden Field; Annapolis, MD	W 29–0	
October 14	Dickinson	Worden Field; Annapolis, MD	W 6–0	
October 18	Western Maryland	Worden Field; Annapolis, MD	W 29–0	
October 21	North Carolina	Worden Field; Annapolis, MD	W 38–0	
October 25	Maryland Agricultural	Worden Field; Annapolis, MD (rivalry)	W 17–0	
October 28	Swarthmore	Worden Field; Annapolis, MD	L 5–6	
November 4	Penn State	Worden Field; Annapolis, MD	W 11–5	
November 11	Bucknell	Worden Field; Annapolis, MD	W 34–0	
November 18	Virginia	Worden Field; Annapolis, MD	W 22–0	
November 25	VPI	Worden Field; Annapolis, MD	W 12–6	
December 2	vs. Army	University Field; Princeton, NJ (Army–Navy Game)	T 6–6	
