= 1905 TCU football team =

American college football season

1905 TCU football
- Conference: Independent
- Record: 4–4
- Head coach: Emory J. Hyde (1st season)
- Captain: H. H. Knight

1905 Southern college football independents records
	Conf.			Overall
Team	W	L	T	W		L		T
Tusculum		–		1	–	0	–	0
Stetson		–		4	–	0	–	1
VPI		–		9	–	1	–	0
Navy		–		10	–	1	–	1
Grant		–		6	–	1	–	0
Kentucky University		–		7	–	0	–	3
Oklahoma		–		7	–	2	–	0
Washington and Lee		–		7	–	2	–	0
Texas A&M		–		7	–	2	–	0
Marshall		–		6	–	2	–	0
North Carolina A&M		–		4	–	1	–	1
West Virginia		–		6	–	3	–	0
Kentucky State College		–		6	–	3	–	1
South Carolina		–		4	–	2	–	1
Maryland		–		6	–	4	–	0
Central State Normal		–		4	–	3	–	1
North Carolina		–		4	–	3	–	1
Virginia		–		5	–	4	–	0
Catholic University		–		0	–	0	–	1
TCU		–		4	–	4	–	0
Delaware		–		3	–	4	–	1
The Citadel		–		2	–	3	–	1
Richmond		–		3	–	5	–	2
George Washington		–		3	–	4	–	2
Davidson		–		3	–	4	–	0
Howard (AL)		–		1	–	2	–	1
VMI		–		2	–	5	–	1
Oklahoma A&M		–		1	–	4	–	2
Arkansas		–		2	–	6	–	0
Kendall		–		1	–	3	–	0
Georgetown		–		2	–	7	–	0
Goldey College		–		1	–	4	–	0
Baylor		–		1	–	6	–	0
Louisiana Industrial		–		0	–	1	–	0

The 1905 TCU football team represented Texas Christian University (TCU) as an independent during the 1905 college football season. Led by first-year head coach, Emory J. Hyde, TCU compiled a record of 4–4. The team's captain was H. H. Knight.

== Schedule ==
Date	Opponent	Site	Result	Attendance	Source
September 30	Baylor	Waco, TX (rivalry)	W 16–0	900	
October 7	at Texas	Clark Field; Austin, TX (rivalry)	L 0–11	2,000	
October 14	at Texas A&M	College Station, TX (rivalry)	L 0–20		
October 28	at Austin	Sherman, TX	W 21–0		
November 4	Texas A&M	Waco, TX	L 11–24		
November 11	Baylor	Waco, TX	L 6–10		
November 16	Trinity (TX)	Waco, TX	W 6–0		
November 30	at Baylor	Carroll Field; Waco, TX	W 17–0		
