= 1905 Delaware football team =

American college football season

1905 Delaware football
- Conference: Independent
- Record: 3–4–1
- Head coach: Nathan Mannakee (3rd season)
- Captain: Paul Pie

1905 Southern college football independents records
	Conf.			Overall
Team	W	L	T	W		L		T
Tusculum		–		1	–	0	–	0
Stetson		–		4	–	0	–	1
VPI		–		9	–	1	–	0
Navy		–		10	–	1	–	1
Grant		–		6	–	1	–	0
Kentucky University		–		7	–	0	–	3
Oklahoma		–		7	–	2	–	0
Washington and Lee		–		7	–	2	–	0
Texas A&M		–		7	–	2	–	0
Marshall		–		6	–	2	–	0
North Carolina A&M		–		4	–	1	–	1
West Virginia		–		6	–	3	–	0
Kentucky State College		–		6	–	3	–	1
South Carolina		–		4	–	2	–	1
Maryland		–		6	–	4	–	0
Central State Normal		–		4	–	3	–	1
North Carolina		–		4	–	3	–	1
Virginia		–		5	–	4	–	0
Catholic University		–		0	–	0	–	1
TCU		–		4	–	4	–	0
Delaware		–		3	–	4	–	1
The Citadel		–		2	–	3	–	1
Richmond		–		3	–	5	–	2
George Washington		–		3	–	4	–	2
Davidson		–		3	–	4	–	0
Howard (AL)		–		1	–	2	–	1
VMI		–		2	–	5	–	1
Oklahoma A&M		–		1	–	4	–	2
Arkansas		–		2	–	6	–	0
Kendall		–		1	–	3	–	0
Georgetown		–		2	–	7	–	0
Goldey College		–		1	–	4	–	0
Baylor		–		1	–	6	–	0
Louisiana Industrial		–		0	–	1	–	0

The 1905 Delaware football team represented Delaware College—now known as the University of Delaware–as an independent during the 1905 college football season. Led by Nathan Mannakee in his third and final year as head coach, Delaware compiled a record of 3–4–1.

== Schedule ==
Date	Opponent	Site	Result	Source
October 7	Williamson	Newark, DE	W 17–0	
October 14	at Johns Hopkins	Baltimore, MD	L 0–11	
October 21	at Washington College	Chestertown, MD	T 6–6	
October 28	Rutgers	Newark, DE	L 0–10	
November 4	Washington College	Newark, DE	W 11–0	
November 8	at Pennsylvania Military	Chester, PA	L 6–12	
November 18	at Fordham	Fordham Field; Bronx, NY	L 0–4	
November 30	Maryland	Newark, DE	W 12–0	
