= 1905 Kendall Orange and Black football team =

American college football season

1905 Kendall Orange and Black football
- Conference: Independent
- Record: 2–3
- Head coach: Applegate (1st season)
- Captain: W. Robertson
- Home stadium: Benson League Park

1905 Southern college football independents records
	Conf.			Overall
Team	W	L	T	W		L		T
Tusculum		–		1	–	0	–	0
Stetson		–		4	–	0	–	1
VPI		–		9	–	1	–	0
Navy		–		10	–	1	–	1
Grant		–		6	–	1	–	0
Kentucky University		–		7	–	0	–	3
Oklahoma		–		7	–	2	–	0
Washington and Lee		–		7	–	2	–	0
Texas A&M		–		7	–	2	–	0
Marshall		–		6	–	2	–	0
North Carolina A&M		–		4	–	1	–	1
West Virginia		–		6	–	3	–	0
Kentucky State College		–		6	–	3	–	1
South Carolina		–		4	–	2	–	1
Maryland		–		6	–	4	–	0
Central State Normal		–		4	–	3	–	1
North Carolina		–		4	–	3	–	1
Virginia		–		5	–	4	–	0
Catholic University		–		0	–	0	–	1
TCU		–		4	–	4	–	0
Delaware		–		3	–	4	–	1
The Citadel		–		2	–	3	–	1
Richmond		–		3	–	5	–	2
George Washington		–		3	–	4	–	2
Davidson		–		3	–	4	–	0
Howard (AL)		–		1	–	2	–	1
VMI		–		2	–	5	–	1
Oklahoma A&M		–		1	–	4	–	2
Arkansas		–		2	–	6	–	0
Kendall		–		1	–	3	–	0
Georgetown		–		2	–	7	–	0
Goldey College		–		1	–	4	–	0
Baylor		–		1	–	6	–	0
Louisiana Industrial		–		0	–	1	–	0

The 1905 Kendall Orange and Black football team represented Henry Kendall College—now known as the University of Tulsa—as an independent during the 1905 college football season. Led by Applegate in his first and only season as head coach, Kendall compiled a record of 2–3.

== Schedule ==
Date	Time	Opponent	Site	Result	Attendance	Source
October 20		at Cherokee Male Seminary	Tahlequah, Indian Territory	L 0–38	1,000	
October 24		at Bacone	Bacone grounds; Muskogee, Indian Territory	W 12–0		
November 3		Cherokee Male Seminary	Benson League Park; Muskogee, Indian Territory	L 5–18	500	
November 11		Fort Smith High School	Benson League Park; Muskogee, Indian Territory	W 5–0	500	
November 30	3:30 p.m.	at Epworth	Benson League Park; Muskogee, Indian Territory	L 0–6	1,200	
All times are in Central time
