= 1905 South Carolina Gamecocks football team =

American college football season

1905 South Carolina Gamecocks football
- Conference: Independent
- Record: 4–2–1
- Head coach: Christie Benet (2nd season)
- Captain: Douglas McKay

1905 Southern college football independents records
	Conf.			Overall
Team	W	L	T	W		L		T
Tusculum		–		1	–	0	–	0
Stetson		–		4	–	0	–	1
VPI		–		9	–	1	–	0
Navy		–		10	–	1	–	1
Grant		–		6	–	1	–	0
Kentucky University		–		7	–	0	–	3
Oklahoma		–		7	–	2	–	0
Washington and Lee		–		7	–	2	–	0
Texas A&M		–		7	–	2	–	0
Marshall		–		6	–	2	–	0
North Carolina A&M		–		4	–	1	–	1
West Virginia		–		6	–	3	–	0
Kentucky State College		–		6	–	3	–	1
South Carolina		–		4	–	2	–	1
Maryland		–		6	–	4	–	0
Central State Normal		–		4	–	3	–	1
North Carolina		–		4	–	3	–	1
Virginia		–		5	–	4	–	0
Catholic University		–		0	–	0	–	1
TCU		–		4	–	4	–	0
Delaware		–		3	–	4	–	1
The Citadel		–		2	–	3	–	1
Richmond		–		3	–	5	–	2
George Washington		–		3	–	4	–	2
Davidson		–		3	–	4	–	0
Howard (AL)		–		1	–	2	–	1
VMI		–		2	–	5	–	1
Oklahoma A&M		–		1	–	4	–	2
Arkansas		–		2	–	6	–	0
Kendall		–		1	–	3	–	0
Georgetown		–		2	–	7	–	0
Goldey College		–		1	–	4	–	0
Baylor		–		1	–	6	–	0
Louisiana Industrial		–		0	–	1	–	0

The 1905 South Carolina Gamecocks football team represented the University of South Carolina as an independent during the 1905 college football season. Led by second-year head coach Christie Benet, South Carolina compiled a record of 4–2–1.

== Schedule ==
Date	Opponent	Site	Result	Source
October 13	Welsh Neck High School	Columbia, SC	W 14–0	
October 20	Bingham School	Columbia, SC	W 19–6	
October 26	North Carolina A&M	Columbia, SC	L 0–29	
November 4	vs. Davidson	Latta Park Baseball Field; Charlotte, NC	W 6–4	
November 11	at Bingham School	Riverside Park; Asheville, NC	T 5–5	
November 18	vs. VPI	Fairgrounds; Roanoke, VA	L 0–34	
November 30	at The Citadel	Hampton Park; Charleston, SC	W 47–0	
