= 1905 Howard Crimson and Blue football team =

American college football season

1905 Howard Crimson and Blue football
- Conference: Independent
- Record: 1–2–1
- Head coach: Davis Stakely (1st season)
- Home stadium: West End Park

1905 Southern college football independents records
	Conf.			Overall
Team	W	L	T	W		L		T
Tusculum		–		1	–	0	–	0
Stetson		–		4	–	0	–	1
VPI		–		9	–	1	–	0
Navy		–		10	–	1	–	1
Grant		–		6	–	1	–	0
Kentucky University		–		7	–	0	–	3
Oklahoma		–		7	–	2	–	0
Washington and Lee		–		7	–	2	–	0
Texas A&M		–		7	–	2	–	0
Marshall		–		6	–	2	–	0
North Carolina A&M		–		4	–	1	–	1
West Virginia		–		6	–	3	–	0
Kentucky State College		–		6	–	3	–	1
South Carolina		–		4	–	2	–	1
Maryland		–		6	–	4	–	0
Central State Normal		–		4	–	3	–	1
North Carolina		–		4	–	3	–	1
Virginia		–		5	–	4	–	0
Catholic University		–		0	–	0	–	1
TCU		–		4	–	4	–	0
Delaware		–		3	–	4	–	1
The Citadel		–		2	–	3	–	1
Richmond		–		3	–	5	–	2
George Washington		–		3	–	4	–	2
Davidson		–		3	–	4	–	0
Howard (AL)		–		1	–	2	–	1
VMI		–		2	–	5	–	1
Oklahoma A&M		–		1	–	4	–	2
Arkansas		–		2	–	6	–	0
Kendall		–		1	–	3	–	0
Georgetown		–		2	–	7	–	0
Goldey College		–		1	–	4	–	0
Baylor		–		1	–	6	–	0
Louisiana Industrial		–		0	–	1	–	0

The 1905 Howard Crimson and Blue football team was an American football team that represented Howard College (now known as the Samford University) as an independent during the 1905 college football season. In their first year under head coach Davis Stakely, the team compiled an 1–2–1 record.

== Schedule ==
Date	Opponent	Site	Result	Source
October 16	Fifth District Agricultural School	West End Park; Birmingham, AL	T 6–6	
November 4	at Jacksonville State	Anniston, AL (rivalry)	W 32–0	
November 11	at Mississippi A&M	Hardy Field; Starkville, MS	L 0–44	
November 30	at Marion	Marion, AL	W 44–10	
