= 1905 Texas A&M Aggies football team =

American college football season

1905 Texas A&M Aggies football
- Conference: Independent
- Record: 7–2
- Head coach: Walter E. Bachman (1st season)
- Home stadium: Kyle Field

1905 Southern college football independents records
	Conf.			Overall
Team	W	L	T	W		L		T
Tusculum		–		1	–	0	–	0
Stetson		–		4	–	0	–	1
VPI		–		9	–	1	–	0
Navy		–		10	–	1	–	1
Grant		–		6	–	1	–	0
Kentucky University		–		7	–	0	–	3
Oklahoma		–		7	–	2	–	0
Washington and Lee		–		7	–	2	–	0
Texas A&M		–		7	–	2	–	0
Marshall		–		6	–	2	–	0
North Carolina A&M		–		4	–	1	–	1
West Virginia		–		6	–	3	–	0
Kentucky State College		–		6	–	3	–	1
South Carolina		–		4	–	2	–	1
Maryland		–		6	–	4	–	0
Central State Normal		–		4	–	3	–	1
North Carolina		–		4	–	3	–	1
Virginia		–		5	–	4	–	0
Catholic University		–		0	–	0	–	1
TCU		–		4	–	4	–	0
Delaware		–		3	–	4	–	1
The Citadel		–		2	–	3	–	1
Richmond		–		3	–	5	–	2
George Washington		–		3	–	4	–	2
Davidson		–		3	–	4	–	0
Howard (AL)		–		1	–	2	–	1
VMI		–		2	–	5	–	1
Oklahoma A&M		–		1	–	4	–	2
Arkansas		–		2	–	6	–	0
Kendall		–		1	–	3	–	0
Georgetown		–		2	–	7	–	0
Goldey College		–		1	–	4	–	0
Baylor		–		1	–	6	–	0
Louisiana Industrial		–		0	–	1	–	0

The 1905 Texas A&M Aggies football team represented the Agricultural and Mechanical College of Texas—now known as Texas A&M University—as an independent during the 1905 college football season. Led by first-year head coach Walter E. Bachman, the Aggies compiled a record of 7–2.

== Schedule ==
Date	Opponent	Site	Result	Source
October 7	Houston YMCA	Kyle Field; College Station, TX	W 29–0	
October 14	TCU	Kyle Field; College Station, TX (rivalry)	W 20–0	
October 19	at Trinity (TX)	Waxahachie, TX	W 23–0	
October 21	at Austin	Sherman, TX	W 18–11	
October 28	at Baylor	Carroll Field; Waco, TX (rivalry)	W 42–0	
November 4	at TCU	Waco, TX	W 24–11	
November 11	Kentucky University	Kyle Field; College Station, TX	L 6–29	
November 18	Baylor	Kyle Field; College Station, TX	W 17–5	
November 30	at Texas	Clark Field; Austin, TX (rivalry)	L 0–27	
