= 1905 The Citadel Bulldogs football team =

American college football season

1905 The Citadel Bulldogs football
- Conference: Independent
- Record: 2–3–1
- Head coach: Sydney Smith (1st season)
- Captain: James Hammond
- Home stadium: Hampton Park

1905 Southern college football independents records
	Conf.			Overall
Team	W	L	T	W		L		T
Tusculum		–		1	–	0	–	0
Stetson		–		4	–	0	–	1
VPI		–		9	–	1	–	0
Navy		–		10	–	1	–	1
Grant		–		6	–	1	–	0
Kentucky University		–		7	–	0	–	3
Oklahoma		–		7	–	2	–	0
Washington and Lee		–		7	–	2	–	0
Texas A&M		–		7	–	2	–	0
Marshall		–		6	–	2	–	0
North Carolina A&M		–		4	–	1	–	1
West Virginia		–		6	–	3	–	0
Kentucky State College		–		6	–	3	–	1
South Carolina		–		4	–	2	–	1
Maryland		–		6	–	4	–	0
Central State Normal		–		4	–	3	–	1
North Carolina		–		4	–	3	–	1
Virginia		–		5	–	4	–	0
Catholic University		–		0	–	0	–	1
TCU		–		4	–	4	–	0
Delaware		–		3	–	4	–	1
The Citadel		–		2	–	3	–	1
Richmond		–		3	–	5	–	2
George Washington		–		3	–	4	–	2
Davidson		–		3	–	4	–	0
Howard (AL)		–		1	–	2	–	1
VMI		–		2	–	5	–	1
Oklahoma A&M		–		1	–	4	–	2
Arkansas		–		2	–	6	–	0
Kendall		–		1	–	3	–	0
Georgetown		–		2	–	7	–	0
Goldey College		–		1	–	4	–	0
Baylor		–		1	–	6	–	0
Louisiana Industrial		–		0	–	1	–	0

The 1905 The Citadel Bulldogs football team represented The Citadel as an independent during the 1905 college football season. This was the first year of intercollegiate football at The Citadel, and the team hired Syd Smith to be the team's first coach. The Board of Visitors would not permit the cadets to travel outside the city of Charleston for games, and all games are believed to have been played at Hampton Park at the site of the old race course.

== Schedule ==
Date	Opponent	Site	Result	Source
October 14	Porter Military Academy	Hampton Park; Charleston, SC	T 0–0	
October 21	Porter Military Academy	Hampton Park; Charleston, SC	W 17–0	
October 28	Porter Military Academy	Hampton Park; Charleston, SC	W 5–0	
November 18	Welsh Neck High School	Hampton Park; Charleston, SC	L 5–6	
November 25	Fort Moultrie	Hampton Park; Charleston, SC	L 0–10	
November 30	South Carolina	Hampton Park; Charleston, SC	L 0–47	
