= 1905 Baylor football team =

American college football season

1905 Baylor football
- Conference: Independent
- Record: 1–6
- Head coach: Archie R. Webb (1st season)
- Captain: C. D. Lester

1905 Southern college football independents records
	Conf.			Overall
Team	W	L	T	W		L		T
Tusculum		–		1	–	0	–	0
Stetson		–		4	–	0	–	1
VPI		–		9	–	1	–	0
Navy		–		10	–	1	–	1
Grant		–		6	–	1	–	0
Kentucky University		–		7	–	0	–	3
Oklahoma		–		7	–	2	–	0
Washington and Lee		–		7	–	2	–	0
Texas A&M		–		7	–	2	–	0
Marshall		–		6	–	2	–	0
North Carolina A&M		–		4	–	1	–	1
West Virginia		–		6	–	3	–	0
Kentucky State College		–		6	–	3	–	1
South Carolina		–		4	–	2	–	1
Maryland		–		6	–	4	–	0
Central State Normal		–		4	–	3	–	1
North Carolina		–		4	–	3	–	1
Virginia		–		5	–	4	–	0
Catholic University		–		0	–	0	–	1
TCU		–		4	–	4	–	0
Delaware		–		3	–	4	–	1
The Citadel		–		2	–	3	–	1
Richmond		–		3	–	5	–	2
George Washington		–		3	–	4	–	2
Davidson		–		3	–	4	–	0
Howard (AL)		–		1	–	2	–	1
VMI		–		2	–	5	–	1
Oklahoma A&M		–		1	–	4	–	2
Arkansas		–		2	–	6	–	0
Kendall		–		1	–	3	–	0
Georgetown		–		2	–	7	–	0
Goldey College		–		1	–	4	–	0
Baylor		–		1	–	6	–	0
Louisiana Industrial		–		0	–	1	–	0

The 1905 Baylor football team was an American football team that represented Baylor University as an independent during the 1905 college football season. In its first season under head coach Archie R. Webb, the team compiled a 1–6 record and was outscored by a total of 159 to 20.

Beginning in 1905, the team's home games were played at Carroll Field, between the Carroll Science Building and Waco Creek.

== Schedule ==
Date	Time	Opponent	Site	Result	Attendance	Source
September 30		at TCU	Waco, TX (rivalry)	L 0–16	900	
October 13	4:20 p.m.	at Trinity (TX)	Waxahachie, TX	L 5–22		
October 21		at Texas	Clark Field; Austin, TX (rivalry)	L 0–39		
October 28		Texas A&M	Waco, TX (rivalry)	L 0–42		
November 11		at TCU	Waco, TX	W 10–0		
November 18		at Texas A&M	College Station, TX	L 5–17		
November 30		TCU	Carroll Field; Waco, TX	L 0–17		

== Game summaries ==
=== Nov. 30 vs. TCU ===
"The game [that] decided the local championship and was witnessed by the largest crowd ever seen on Carroll field" began with a first half that "was the most spectacular ever played on a local gridiron." In that twenty-minute first half, each team's defense held the other's offense scoreless. The game began with TCU receiving the kickoff and advanced from their 20-yard line to Baylor's 15 when the latter recovered a fumble. Baylor's own drive advanced to TCU's 40-yard line, but likewise fumbled. TCU's next possession brought them to the Baylor 2, but they couldn't convert and Baylor got a turnover on downs. Baylor also could not convert and TCU got the ball forty yards back by a punt, but returned it to the Baylor 5 before fumbling again; Baylor again had to punt, as did TCU, and the half ended scoreless. In the 30-minute second half, TCU scored three touchdowns and made the first and third tries, for seventeen points, while Baylor struggled on defense and offense.
