= Archie R. Webb =

American football player and coach (1881–1961)

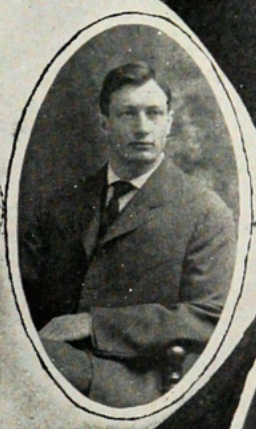
- Webb pictured in The Round-Up 1906, Baylor yearbook

Biographical details
- Born: May 2, 1881; Whitehall, Wisconsin, U.S.
- Died: August 27, 1961 (aged 80); Whitehall, Wisconsin, U.S.

Playing career
- 1901–1904: Brown

Coaching career (HC unless noted)
- 1905: Baylor

Head coaching record
- Overall: 1–6

Archibald Roy Webb (May 2, 1881 – August 27, 1961) was an American college football player and coach. He served as the sixth head football coach at Baylor University, serving for one season, in 1905, and compiling a record of 1–6. Before coaching at Baylor, Webb attended Brown University, captaining the 1903 Brown Bears football team before graduating in 1905.

Webb was born on May 2, 1881, and lived in Whitehall, Wisconsin, for most of his life. He died of a heart attack on August 27, 1961, at the Golden Age Home in Whitehall.

== Head coaching record ==
Year	Team	Overall	Conference	Standing	Bowl/playoffs
Baylor (Independent) (1905)
1905	Baylor	1–6			
Baylor:		1–6			
Total:		1–6			
