= 1905 Kentucky State College Blue and White football team =

American college football season

1905 Kentucky State College Blue and White football
- Conference: Independent
- Record: 6–3–1
- Head coach: Fred Schacht (2nd season)
- Captain: Bill Kemper

1905 Southern college football independents records
| | Conf. | | | Overall |
| Team | W | L | T | W | | L | | T |
|---|---|---|---|---|---|---|---|---|
| Tusculum | | – | | 1 | – | 0 | – | 0 |
| Stetson | | – | | 4 | – | 0 | – | 1 |
| VPI | | – | | 9 | – | 1 | – | 0 |
| Navy | | – | | 10 | – | 1 | – | 1 |
| Grant | | – | | 6 | – | 1 | – | 0 |
| Kentucky University | | – | | 7 | – | 0 | – | 3 |
| Oklahoma | | – | | 7 | – | 2 | – | 0 |
| Washington and Lee | | – | | 7 | – | 2 | – | 0 |
| Texas A&M | | – | | 7 | – | 2 | – | 0 |
| Marshall | | – | | 6 | – | 2 | – | 0 |
| North Carolina A&M | | – | | 4 | – | 1 | – | 1 |
| West Virginia | | – | | 6 | – | 3 | – | 0 |
| Kentucky State College | | – | | 6 | – | 3 | – | 1 |
| South Carolina | | – | | 4 | – | 2 | – | 1 |
| Maryland | | – | | 6 | – | 4 | – | 0 |
| Central State Normal | | – | | 4 | – | 3 | – | 1 |
| North Carolina | | – | | 4 | – | 3 | – | 1 |
| Virginia | | – | | 5 | – | 4 | – | 0 |
| Catholic University | | – | | 0 | – | 0 | – | 1 |
| TCU | | – | | 4 | – | 4 | – | 0 |
| Delaware | | – | | 3 | – | 4 | – | 1 |
| The Citadel | | – | | 2 | – | 3 | – | 1 |
| Richmond | | – | | 3 | – | 5 | – | 2 |
| George Washington | | – | | 3 | – | 4 | – | 2 |
| Davidson | | – | | 3 | – | 4 | – | 0 |
| Howard (AL) | | – | | 1 | – | 2 | – | 1 |
| VMI | | – | | 2 | – | 5 | – | 1 |
| Oklahoma A&M | | – | | 1 | – | 4 | – | 2 |
| Arkansas | | – | | 2 | – | 6 | – | 0 |
| Kendall | | – | | 1 | – | 3 | – | 0 |
| Georgetown | | – | | 2 | – | 7 | – | 0 |
| Goldey College | | – | | 1 | – | 4 | – | 0 |
| Baylor | | – | | 1 | – | 6 | – | 0 |
| Louisiana Industrial | | – | | 0 | – | 1 | – | 0 |

The 1905 Kentucky State College Blue and White football team represented Kentucky State College—now known as the University of Kentucky—as an independent during the 1905 college football season. Led by Fred Schacht in his second and final year as head coach, Kentucky State College compiled a record of 6–3–1.

== Schedule ==
| Date | Time | Opponent | Site | Result | Source |
|---|---|---|---|---|---|
| September 27 | | Cynthiana | Lexington, KY | W 52–0 | |
| September 30 | | Catlettsburg AC | Lexington, KY | W 23–0 | |
| October 7 | | at Indiana | Jordan Field; Bloomington, IN (rivalry) | L 0–29 | |
| October 14 | | Kentucky Military Institute | Lexington, KY | W 12–4 | |
| October 28 | | Berea | Lexington, KY | W 46–0 | |
| November 2 | | at Marshall | Central Field; Huntington, WV | W 53–0 | |
| November 4 | | at West Virginia | Morgantown, WV | L 0–45 | |
| November 11 | | Cumberland (TN) | Lexington, KY | W 6–0 (forfeit) | |
| November 18 | | at Saint Louis | Sportsman's Park; St. Louis, MO | L 0–82 | |
| November 25 | 3:00 p.m. | Central University (KY) | Lexington, KY (rivalry) | T 11–11 | |
All times are in Eastern time
