= 1905 Kentucky University football team =

American college football season

1905 Kentucky University football
- Conference: Independent
- Record: 7–0–3
- Head coach: Curtis Redden (1st season)
- Home stadium: K.U. Athletic Park

1905 Southern college football independents records
	Conf.			Overall
Team	W	L	T	W		L		T
Tusculum		–		1	–	0	–	0
Stetson		–		4	–	0	–	1
VPI		–		9	–	1	–	0
Navy		–		10	–	1	–	1
Grant		–		6	–	1	–	0
Kentucky University		–		7	–	0	–	3
Oklahoma		–		7	–	2	–	0
Washington and Lee		–		7	–	2	–	0
Texas A&M		–		7	–	2	–	0
Marshall		–		6	–	2	–	0
North Carolina A&M		–		4	–	1	–	1
West Virginia		–		6	–	3	–	0
Kentucky State College		–		6	–	3	–	1
South Carolina		–		4	–	2	–	1
Maryland		–		6	–	4	–	0
Central State Normal		–		4	–	3	–	1
North Carolina		–		4	–	3	–	1
Virginia		–		5	–	4	–	0
Catholic University		–		0	–	0	–	1
TCU		–		4	–	4	–	0
Delaware		–		3	–	4	–	1
The Citadel		–		2	–	3	–	1
Richmond		–		3	–	5	–	2
George Washington		–		3	–	4	–	2
Davidson		–		3	–	4	–	0
Howard (AL)		–		1	–	2	–	1
VMI		–		2	–	5	–	1
Oklahoma A&M		–		1	–	4	–	2
Arkansas		–		2	–	6	–	0
Kendall		–		1	–	3	–	0
Georgetown		–		2	–	7	–	0
Goldey College		–		1	–	4	–	0
Baylor		–		1	–	6	–	0
Louisiana Industrial		–		0	–	1	–	0

The 1905 Kentucky University football team was an American football team that represented Kentucky University—now known as Transylvania University—as an independent during the 1905 college football season. Led by Curtis Redden in his first and only season as head coach, Kentucky University compiled a record of 7–0–3.

== Schedule ==
Date	Time	Opponent	Site	Result	Attendance	Source
September 23	3:10 p.m.	Kentucky Military Institute	K.U. Athletic Park; Lexington, KY	T 6–6		
September 30		at Louisville Athletic Club	Eclipse Park; Louisville, KY	W 29–0		
October 6		Marietta	K.U. Athletic Park; Lexington, KY	T 0–0		
October 14		at Berea	Berea, KY	W 27–0		
October 21		at Northwestern	Northwestern Field; Evanston, IL	T 0–0		
November 4		Central University	K.U. Athletic Park; Lexington, KY	W 34–0		
November 10		at Texas	Clark Field; Austin, TX	W 6–0		
November 11		at Texas A&M	College Station, TX	W 29–6		
November 13		at Arkansas	The Hill; Fayetteville, AR	W 6–0	1,000	
November 30		Ohio Wesleyan	K.U. Athletic Park; Lexington, KY	W 40–0		
