= 1905 Oklahoma A&M Aggies football team =

American college football season

1905 Oklahoma A&M Aggies football
- Conference: Independent
- Record: 1–4–2
- Head coach: F. A. McCoy (1st season)

1905 Southern college football independents records
	Conf.			Overall
Team	W	L	T	W		L		T
Tusculum		–		1	–	0	–	0
Stetson		–		4	–	0	–	1
VPI		–		9	–	1	–	0
Navy		–		10	–	1	–	1
Grant		–		6	–	1	–	0
Kentucky University		–		7	–	0	–	3
Oklahoma		–		7	–	2	–	0
Washington and Lee		–		7	–	2	–	0
Texas A&M		–		7	–	2	–	0
Marshall		–		6	–	2	–	0
North Carolina A&M		–		4	–	1	–	1
West Virginia		–		6	–	3	–	0
Kentucky State College		–		6	–	3	–	1
South Carolina		–		4	–	2	–	1
Maryland		–		6	–	4	–	0
Central State Normal		–		4	–	3	–	1
North Carolina		–		4	–	3	–	1
Virginia		–		5	–	4	–	0
Catholic University		–		0	–	0	–	1
TCU		–		4	–	4	–	0
Delaware		–		3	–	4	–	1
The Citadel		–		2	–	3	–	1
Richmond		–		3	–	5	–	2
George Washington		–		3	–	4	–	2
Davidson		–		3	–	4	–	0
Howard (AL)		–		1	–	2	–	1
VMI		–		2	–	5	–	1
Oklahoma A&M		–		1	–	4	–	2
Arkansas		–		2	–	6	–	0
Kendall		–		1	–	3	–	0
Georgetown		–		2	–	7	–	0
Goldey College		–		1	–	4	–	0
Baylor		–		1	–	6	–	0
Louisiana Industrial		–		0	–	1	–	0

The 1905 Oklahoma A&M Aggies football team represented Oklahoma A&M College in the 1905 college football season. This was the fifth year of football at A&M and the team's head coach was F. A. McCoy. The Aggies played their home games in Stillwater, Oklahoma Territory. They finished the season 1–4–2.

== Schedule ==
Date	Opponent	Site	Result
September 30	Chilocco	Stillwater, Oklahoma Territory	T 0–0
October 7	at Chilocco		L 0–34
October 14	at Epworth	Oklahoma City, Oklahoma Territory	T 0–0
October 16	at Central State Normal	Edmond, Oklahoma Territory	L 0–6
October 30	Central State Normal	Stillwater, Oklahoma Territory	W 5–0
November 10	Tulsa Business Men (Tulsa Men's Club)	Stillwater, Oklahoma Territory	L 5–6
November 30	at Logan County High School	Guthrie, Oklahoma Territory	L 11–17
