= 1905 West Virginia Mountaineers football team =

American college football season

1905 West Virginia Mountaineers football
- Conference: Independent
- Record: 6–3
- Head coach: Carl Forkum (1st season)
- Captain: Paul H. Martin

1905 Southern college football independents records
	Conf.			Overall
Team	W	L	T	W		L		T
Tusculum		–		1	–	0	–	0
Stetson		–		4	–	0	–	1
VPI		–		9	–	1	–	0
Navy		–		10	–	1	–	1
Grant		–		6	–	1	–	0
Kentucky University		–		7	–	0	–	3
Oklahoma		–		7	–	2	–	0
Washington and Lee		–		7	–	2	–	0
Texas A&M		–		7	–	2	–	0
Marshall		–		6	–	2	–	0
North Carolina A&M		–		4	–	1	–	1
West Virginia		–		6	–	3	–	0
Kentucky State College		–		6	–	3	–	1
South Carolina		–		4	–	2	–	1
Maryland		–		6	–	4	–	0
Central State Normal		–		4	–	3	–	1
North Carolina		–		4	–	3	–	1
Virginia		–		5	–	4	–	0
Catholic University		–		0	–	0	–	1
TCU		–		4	–	4	–	0
Delaware		–		3	–	4	–	1
The Citadel		–		2	–	3	–	1
Richmond		–		3	–	5	–	2
George Washington		–		3	–	4	–	2
Davidson		–		3	–	4	–	0
Howard (AL)		–		1	–	2	–	1
VMI		–		2	–	5	–	1
Oklahoma A&M		–		1	–	4	–	2
Arkansas		–		2	–	6	–	0
Kendall		–		1	–	3	–	0
Georgetown		–		2	–	7	–	0
Goldey College		–		1	–	4	–	0
Baylor		–		1	–	6	–	0
Louisiana Industrial		–		0	–	1	–	0

The 1905 West Virginia Mountaineers football team was an American football that represented West Virginia University as an independent during the 1905 college football season. In its first season under head coach Carl Forkum, the team compiled a 6–3 record and outscored opponents by a total of 172 to 44. Paul H. Martin was the team captain.

== Schedule ==
Date	Opponent	Site	Result	Attendance	Source
September 30	Westminster (PA)	Morgantown, WV	L 0–15		
October 7	California Normal (PA)	Morgantown, WV	W 12–0		
October 14	Ohio	Morgantown, WV	W 28–0		
October 21	Bethany (WV)	Morgantown, WV	W 46–0		
November 4	Kentucky State College	Morgantown, WV	W 45–0		
November 11	at California Normal (PA)	California, PA	L 0–17		
November 18	vs. Bethany (WV)	Wheeling, WV	W 24–0		
November 24	at Penn State	State College, PA (rivalry)	L 0–6		
November 30	at Marietta	Marietta, OH	W 17–6	4,000	
