= 1905 Marshall Thundering Herd football team =

American college football season

1905 Marshall Thundering Herd football
- Conference: Independent
- Record: 6–2
- Head coach: Alfred McCray (1st season)
- Captain: Lew Wells
- Home stadium: Central Field

1905 Southern college football independents records
	Conf.			Overall
Team	W	L	T	W		L		T
Tusculum		–		1	–	0	–	0
Stetson		–		4	–	0	–	1
VPI		–		9	–	1	–	0
Navy		–		10	–	1	–	1
Grant		–		6	–	1	–	0
Kentucky University		–		7	–	0	–	3
Oklahoma		–		7	–	2	–	0
Washington and Lee		–		7	–	2	–	0
Texas A&M		–		7	–	2	–	0
Marshall		–		6	–	2	–	0
North Carolina A&M		–		4	–	1	–	1
West Virginia		–		6	–	3	–	0
Kentucky State College		–		6	–	3	–	1
South Carolina		–		4	–	2	–	1
Maryland		–		6	–	4	–	0
Central State Normal		–		4	–	3	–	1
North Carolina		–		4	–	3	–	1
Virginia		–		5	–	4	–	0
Catholic University		–		0	–	0	–	1
TCU		–		4	–	4	–	0
Delaware		–		3	–	4	–	1
The Citadel		–		2	–	3	–	1
Richmond		–		3	–	5	–	2
George Washington		–		3	–	4	–	2
Davidson		–		3	–	4	–	0
Howard (AL)		–		1	–	2	–	1
VMI		–		2	–	5	–	1
Oklahoma A&M		–		1	–	4	–	2
Arkansas		–		2	–	6	–	0
Kendall		–		1	–	3	–	0
Georgetown		–		2	–	7	–	0
Goldey College		–		1	–	4	–	0
Baylor		–		1	–	6	–	0
Louisiana Industrial		–		0	–	1	–	0

The 1905 Marshall Thundering Herd football team represented Marshall College (now Marshall University) in the 1905 college football season. Marshall posted a 6–2 record, being outscored by its opposition 43–98. Home games were played on a campus field called "Central Field" which is presently Campus Commons.

== Schedule ==
Date	Opponent	Site	Result
September 30	Ashland HS	Central Field; Huntington, WV	W (forfeit)
October 5	at Kenova	Kenova, WV	W 15–5
October 7	Portsmouth HS	Central Field; Huntington, WV	W 5–0
October 18	Ironton HS	Central Field; Huntington, WV	W 12–0
October 21	Charleston HS	Central Field; Huntington, WV	W (forfeit)
November 2	Kentucky	Central Field; Huntington, WV	L 0–53
November 11	Ohio	Central Field; Huntington, WV	W 6–5
November 30	at Miami (OH)	Miami Field; Oxford, OH	L 5–35
