= Forkum =

Forkum is a surname. Notable people with the surname include:

- Carl Forkum (1882–1934), American football and baseball player and coach
- John Dehner (born John Forkum, 1915–1992), American actor and animator
