= 1905 Goldey College football team =

American college football season

1905 Goldey College football
- Conference: Independent
- Record: 1–4
- Head coach: Unknown
- Captain: Carvin

1905 Southern college football independents records
| | Conf. | | | Overall |
| Team | W | L | T | W | | L | | T |
|---|---|---|---|---|---|---|---|---|
| Tusculum | | – | | 1 | – | 0 | – | 0 |
| Stetson | | – | | 4 | – | 0 | – | 1 |
| VPI | | – | | 9 | – | 1 | – | 0 |
| Navy | | – | | 10 | – | 1 | – | 1 |
| Grant | | – | | 6 | – | 1 | – | 0 |
| Kentucky University | | – | | 7 | – | 0 | – | 3 |
| Oklahoma | | – | | 7 | – | 2 | – | 0 |
| Washington and Lee | | – | | 7 | – | 2 | – | 0 |
| Texas A&M | | – | | 7 | – | 2 | – | 0 |
| Marshall | | – | | 6 | – | 2 | – | 0 |
| North Carolina A&M | | – | | 4 | – | 1 | – | 1 |
| West Virginia | | – | | 6 | – | 3 | – | 0 |
| Kentucky State College | | – | | 6 | – | 3 | – | 1 |
| South Carolina | | – | | 4 | – | 2 | – | 1 |
| Maryland | | – | | 6 | – | 4 | – | 0 |
| Central State Normal | | – | | 4 | – | 3 | – | 1 |
| North Carolina | | – | | 4 | – | 3 | – | 1 |
| Virginia | | – | | 5 | – | 4 | – | 0 |
| Catholic University | | – | | 0 | – | 0 | – | 1 |
| TCU | | – | | 4 | – | 4 | – | 0 |
| Delaware | | – | | 3 | – | 4 | – | 1 |
| The Citadel | | – | | 2 | – | 3 | – | 1 |
| Richmond | | – | | 3 | – | 5 | – | 2 |
| George Washington | | – | | 3 | – | 4 | – | 2 |
| Davidson | | – | | 3 | – | 4 | – | 0 |
| Howard (AL) | | – | | 1 | – | 2 | – | 1 |
| VMI | | – | | 2 | – | 5 | – | 1 |
| Oklahoma A&M | | – | | 1 | – | 4 | – | 2 |
| Arkansas | | – | | 2 | – | 6 | – | 0 |
| Kendall | | – | | 1 | – | 3 | – | 0 |
| Georgetown | | – | | 2 | – | 7 | – | 0 |
| Goldey College | | – | | 1 | – | 4 | – | 0 |
| Baylor | | – | | 1 | – | 6 | – | 0 |
| Louisiana Industrial | | – | | 0 | – | 1 | – | 0 |

The 1905 Goldey College football team represented Goldey College (now known as Goldey–Beacom College) in the 1905 college football season as an independent. They compiled a record of 1–4.

== Schedule ==
| Date | Time | Opponent | Site | Result | Source |
|---|---|---|---|---|---|
| October 14 | | St. Thomas's Cadets | Front & Union Streets | L 0–6 | |
| October 21 | | Delaware reserves | | W 6–5 | |
| October 31 | 3:00 p.m. | Wilmington High School | Front & Union Streets | L 0–16 | |
| c. November 11 | | at Elkton High School | Elkton, MD | L (forfeit) (Note: Goldey College was forced to forfeit after three of their players were injured.) | |
| November 18 | | at New Castle High School | Battery Park; New Castle, PA | L 0–21 | |
