= 1905 Grant football team =

American college football season

1905 Grant football
- Conference: Independent
- Record: 6–1
- Head coach: Walter Hullihen (2nd season)
- Captain: Collis Spencer
- Home stadium: Olympic Park Field

1905 Southern college football independents records
| | Conf. | | | Overall |
| Team | W | L | T | W | | L | | T |
|---|---|---|---|---|---|---|---|---|
| Tusculum | | – | | 1 | – | 0 | – | 0 |
| Stetson | | – | | 4 | – | 0 | – | 1 |
| VPI | | – | | 9 | – | 1 | – | 0 |
| Navy | | – | | 10 | – | 1 | – | 1 |
| Grant | | – | | 6 | – | 1 | – | 0 |
| Kentucky University | | – | | 7 | – | 0 | – | 3 |
| Oklahoma | | – | | 7 | – | 2 | – | 0 |
| Washington and Lee | | – | | 7 | – | 2 | – | 0 |
| Texas A&M | | – | | 7 | – | 2 | – | 0 |
| Marshall | | – | | 6 | – | 2 | – | 0 |
| North Carolina A&M | | – | | 4 | – | 1 | – | 1 |
| West Virginia | | – | | 6 | – | 3 | – | 0 |
| Kentucky State College | | – | | 6 | – | 3 | – | 1 |
| South Carolina | | – | | 4 | – | 2 | – | 1 |
| Maryland | | – | | 6 | – | 4 | – | 0 |
| Central State Normal | | – | | 4 | – | 3 | – | 1 |
| North Carolina | | – | | 4 | – | 3 | – | 1 |
| Virginia | | – | | 5 | – | 4 | – | 0 |
| Catholic University | | – | | 0 | – | 0 | – | 1 |
| TCU | | – | | 4 | – | 4 | – | 0 |
| Delaware | | – | | 3 | – | 4 | – | 1 |
| The Citadel | | – | | 2 | – | 3 | – | 1 |
| Richmond | | – | | 3 | – | 5 | – | 2 |
| George Washington | | – | | 3 | – | 4 | – | 2 |
| Davidson | | – | | 3 | – | 4 | – | 0 |
| Howard (AL) | | – | | 1 | – | 2 | – | 1 |
| VMI | | – | | 2 | – | 5 | – | 1 |
| Oklahoma A&M | | – | | 1 | – | 4 | – | 2 |
| Arkansas | | – | | 2 | – | 6 | – | 0 |
| Kendall | | – | | 1 | – | 3 | – | 0 |
| Georgetown | | – | | 2 | – | 7 | – | 0 |
| Goldey College | | – | | 1 | – | 4 | – | 0 |
| Baylor | | – | | 1 | – | 6 | – | 0 |
| Louisiana Industrial | | – | | 0 | – | 1 | – | 0 |

The 1905 Grant football team was an American football team that represented the Chattanooga campus of U. S. Grant Memorial University (now known as the University of Tennessee at Chattanooga) during the 1905 college football season. In its second year under head coach Walter Hullihen, the team compiled a 6–1 record.

== Schedule ==
| Date | Opponent | Site | Result | Source |
|---|---|---|---|---|
| October 15 | at Dayton High School | Dayton, TN | W 45–0 | |
| October 27 | at Maryville (TN) | Maryville, TN | W 11–4 | |
| October 31 | Cumberland (TN) | Olympic Park Field; Chattanooga, TN | L 6–11 | |
| November 4 | Chattanooga School for the Deaf and Dumb | League Park; Chattanooga, TN | W 26–0 | |
| November 11 | Maryville | League Park; Chattanooga, TN | W 10–0 | |
| November 30 | Southwestern Presbyterian | League Park; Chattanooga, TN | W 41–0 | |
| December 2 | Tennessee | Olympic Park Field; Chattanooga, TN | W 5–0 | |
