= 1905 George Washington Hatchetites football team =

American college football season

1905 George Washington Hatchetites football
- Conference: Independent
- Record: 3–4–2
- Head coach: Charles A. Barnard (1st season)

1905 Southern college football independents records
	Conf.			Overall
Team	W	L	T	W		L		T
Tusculum		–		1	–	0	–	0
Stetson		–		4	–	0	–	1
VPI		–		9	–	1	–	0
Navy		–		10	–	1	–	1
Grant		–		6	–	1	–	0
Kentucky University		–		7	–	0	–	3
Oklahoma		–		7	–	2	–	0
Washington and Lee		–		7	–	2	–	0
Texas A&M		–		7	–	2	–	0
Marshall		–		6	–	2	–	0
North Carolina A&M		–		4	–	1	–	1
West Virginia		–		6	–	3	–	0
Kentucky State College		–		6	–	3	–	1
South Carolina		–		4	–	2	–	1
Maryland		–		6	–	4	–	0
Central State Normal		–		4	–	3	–	1
North Carolina		–		4	–	3	–	1
Virginia		–		5	–	4	–	0
Catholic University		–		0	–	0	–	1
TCU		–		4	–	4	–	0
Delaware		–		3	–	4	–	1
The Citadel		–		2	–	3	–	1
Richmond		–		3	–	5	–	2
George Washington		–		3	–	4	–	2
Davidson		–		3	–	4	–	0
Howard (AL)		–		1	–	2	–	1
VMI		–		2	–	5	–	1
Oklahoma A&M		–		1	–	4	–	2
Arkansas		–		2	–	6	–	0
Kendall		–		1	–	3	–	0
Georgetown		–		2	–	7	–	0
Goldey College		–		1	–	4	–	0
Baylor		–		1	–	6	–	0
Louisiana Industrial		–		0	–	1	–	0

The 1905 George Washington Hatchetites Colonials football team was an American football team that represented George Washington University as an independent during the 1905 college football season. In their first season under head coach Charles A. Barnard, the team compiled a 3–4–2 record.

== Schedule ==
Date	Opponent	Site	Result	Source
October 7	Gallaudet	Association Field; Washington, DC	W 21–0	
October 14	at Swarthmore	Whittier Field; Swarthmore, PA	L 0–30	
October 21	Johns Hopkins	Van Ness Park; Washington, DC	T 0–0	
October 28	University of Maryland, Baltimore	Van Ness Park; Washington, DC	T 0–0	
November 4	at St. John's (MD)	Annapolis, MD	W 12–9	
November 11	Virginia	American League Park; Washington, DC	L 0–55	
November 18	Western Maryland	Van Ness Park; Washington, DC	W 6–5	
November 25	at Georgetown	Georgetown Field; Washington, DC	L 6–12	
November 30	Washington and Lee	Van Ness Park; Washington, DC	L 0–17	
