= 1905 Louisiana Industrial football team =

American college football season

1905 Louisiana Industrial football
- Conference: Independent
- Record: 0–1
- Head coach: J. U. Bragg (1st season)
- Captain: J. P. Pope

1905 Southern college football independents records
	Conf.			Overall
Team	W	L	T	W		L		T
Tusculum		–		1	–	0	–	0
Stetson		–		4	–	0	–	1
VPI		–		9	–	1	–	0
Navy		–		10	–	1	–	1
Grant		–		6	–	1	–	0
Kentucky University		–		7	–	0	–	3
Oklahoma		–		7	–	2	–	0
Washington and Lee		–		7	–	2	–	0
Texas A&M		–		7	–	2	–	0
Marshall		–		6	–	2	–	0
North Carolina A&M		–		4	–	1	–	1
West Virginia		–		6	–	3	–	0
Kentucky State College		–		6	–	3	–	1
South Carolina		–		4	–	2	–	1
Maryland		–		6	–	4	–	0
Central State Normal		–		4	–	3	–	1
North Carolina		–		4	–	3	–	1
Virginia		–		5	–	4	–	0
Catholic University		–		0	–	0	–	1
TCU		–		4	–	4	–	0
Delaware		–		3	–	4	–	1
The Citadel		–		2	–	3	–	1
Richmond		–		3	–	5	–	2
George Washington		–		3	–	4	–	2
Davidson		–		3	–	4	–	0
Howard (AL)		–		1	–	2	–	1
VMI		–		2	–	5	–	1
Oklahoma A&M		–		1	–	4	–	2
Arkansas		–		2	–	6	–	0
Kendall		–		1	–	3	–	0
Georgetown		–		2	–	7	–	0
Goldey College		–		1	–	4	–	0
Baylor		–		1	–	6	–	0
Louisiana Industrial		–		0	–	1	–	0

The 1905 Louisiana Industrial football team was an American football team that represented the Louisiana Industrial Institute—now known as Louisiana Tech University—as an independent during the 1905 college football season. In their first and only season under head coach J. U. Bragg, Louisiana Industrial compiled a 0–1 record, losing their only game to LSU in Baton Rouge, Louisiana. The team's captain was J. P. Pope.

== Schedule ==
Date	Opponent	Site	Result	Source
November 18	at LSU	State Field; Baton Rouge, LA	L 0–16	
