= Ancil D. Brown =

American football player and coach (1873–1960)

Biographical details
- Born: September 19, 1873; Freetown, New York, U.S.
- Died: March 17, 1960 (aged 86); Syracuse, New York, U.S.

Playing career
- 1900–1902: Syracuse

Coaching career (HC unless noted)
- 1903: Syracuse
- 1904–1905: Arkansas

Head coaching record
- Overall: 11–15

Ancil Delos Brown (September 19, 1873 – March 17, 1960) was an American college football player and coach. He served as the co-head football coach with Jason B. Parrish at Syracuse University in 1903 and as the head football coach at the University of Arkansas from 1904 to 1905, compiling a career head coaching record of 11–15. Brown was born in Freetown, New York in 1873.

Brown was an alumnus of the Syracuse University and captained their 1902 football team. He was also a member of the men's crew from 1900 to 1905. He later worked as an attorney and was married to Lillian. He died in 1960 at his home in Syracuse, New York.

== Head coaching record ==
Year	Team	Overall	Conference	Standing	Bowl/playoffs
Syracuse Orangemen (Independent) (1903)
1903	Syracuse	5–4			
Arkansas Cardinals (Independent) (1904–1905)
1904	Arkansas	4–3			
1905	Arkansas	2–6			
Arkansas:		6–9			
Total:		11–13			
