= 1905 Texas Longhorns football team =

American college football season

1905 Texas Longhorns football
- Conference: Southwestern Intercollegiate Athletic Association
- Record: 5–4 (3–1 SWIAA)
- Head coach: Ralph Hutchinson (3rd season)
- Captain: Don Robinson
- Home stadium: Clark Field

The 1905 Texas Longhorns football team was an American football team that represented the University of Texas (now known as the University of Texas at Austin) as a member of the Southwestern Intercollegiate Athletic Association (SWIAA) during the 1905 college football season. In their third year under head coach Ralph Hutchinson, the Longhorns compiled an overall record of 5–4, with a mark of 3–1 in conference play.

== Schedule ==
Date	Time	Opponent	Site	Result	Attendance	Source
October 7		TCU*	Clark Field; Austin, TX (rivalry)	W 11–0	2,000	
October 13		Haskell*	Clark Field; Austin, TX	L 0–17		
October 21		Baylor*	Clark Field; Austin, TX (rivalry)	W 39–0		
October 28		at Vanderbilt	Dudley Field; Nashville, TN	L 0–33		
October 31		at Arkansas*	The Hill; Fayetteville, AR (rivalry)	W 4–0		
November 3	3:30 p.m.	vs. Oklahoma*	Colcord Park; Oklahoma City, Oklahoma Territory (rivalry)	L 0–2	2,500	
November 10		Kentucky University*	Clark Field; Austin, TX	L 0–6		
November 17		Sewanee	Clark Field; Austin, TX	W 17–10		
November 30		Texas A&M	Clark Field; Austin, TX (rivalry)	W 27–0		
*Non-conference game
