= Jason B. Parrish =

American football player and coach (1878–1906)

Biographical details
- Born: September 28, 1878; Canandaigua, New York, U.S.
- Died: October 3, 1906 (aged 28); Flushing, New York, U.S.

Playing career
- 1898–1901: Syracuse

Coaching career (HC unless noted)
- 1902: Hampden–Sydney
- 1903: Syracuse

Jason Basford Parrish (September 28, 1878 – October 3, 1906) was an American football player and coach. He served as the head football coach at Hampden–Sydney College in 1902 and as co-head coach with Ancil D. Brown at Syracuse University in 1903. He was also a member of the Syracuse Orange men's crew in 1901.

Parrish died on October 3, 1906. He was buried at Rose Ridge Cemetery.

== Head coaching record ==
Year	Team	Overall	Conference	Standing	Bowl/playoffs
Hampden–Sydney Tigers (Independent) (1902)
1902	Hampden–Sydney	3–2			
Hampden–Sydney:		3–2			
Syracuse Orangemen (Independent) (1903)
1903	Syracuse	5–4			
Syracuse:		5–4			
Total:		8–6			
