= 1905 Washington and Lee Generals football team =

American college football season

1905 Washington and Lee Generals football
- Conference: Independent
- Record: 7–2
- Head coach: R. R. Brown (1st season)
- Captain: E. Rankin
- Home stadium: Wilson Field

1905 Southern college football independents records
	Conf.			Overall
Team	W	L	T	W		L		T
Tusculum		–		1	–	0	–	0
Stetson		–		4	–	0	–	1
VPI		–		9	–	1	–	0
Navy		–		10	–	1	–	1
Grant		–		6	–	1	–	0
Kentucky University		–		7	–	0	–	3
Oklahoma		–		7	–	2	–	0
Washington and Lee		–		7	–	2	–	0
Texas A&M		–		7	–	2	–	0
Marshall		–		6	–	2	–	0
North Carolina A&M		–		4	–	1	–	1
West Virginia		–		6	–	3	–	0
Kentucky State College		–		6	–	3	–	1
South Carolina		–		4	–	2	–	1
Maryland		–		6	–	4	–	0
Central State Normal		–		4	–	3	–	1
North Carolina		–		4	–	3	–	1
Virginia		–		5	–	4	–	0
Catholic University		–		0	–	0	–	1
TCU		–		4	–	4	–	0
Delaware		–		3	–	4	–	1
The Citadel		–		2	–	3	–	1
Richmond		–		3	–	5	–	2
George Washington		–		3	–	4	–	2
Davidson		–		3	–	4	–	0
Howard (AL)		–		1	–	2	–	1
VMI		–		2	–	5	–	1
Oklahoma A&M		–		1	–	4	–	2
Arkansas		–		2	–	6	–	0
Kendall		–		1	–	3	–	0
Georgetown		–		2	–	7	–	0
Goldey College		–		1	–	4	–	0
Baylor		–		1	–	6	–	0
Louisiana Industrial		–		0	–	1	–	0

The 1905 Washington and Lee Generals football team represented Washington and Lee University as an independent during the 1905 college football season. This was the school's first successful football team, capped by the victory on Thanksgiving over George Washington.

== Schedule ==
Date	Time	Opponent	Site	Result	Source
September 26		Miller's School	Wilson Field; Lexington, VA	W 12–0	
October 3		Richmond	Wilson Field; Lexington, VA	W 34–0	
October 10		Hampden–Sydney	Wilson Field; Lexington, VA	W 18–0	
October 17		Roanoke	Wilson Field; Lexington, VA	W 34–0	
November 1	3:30 p.m.	at Richmond	Broad Street Park; Richmond, VA	W 6–0	
November 4		at Randolph–Macon	Ashland, VA	W 16–0	
November 11		at VPI	Gibboney Field; Blacksburg, VA	L 0–15	
November 18		at North Carolina A&M	Raleigh, NC	L 0–21	
November 30		at George Washington	Van Ness Park; Washington, DC	W 17–0	
