= Carl Forkum =

American athlete and coach (1882–1934)

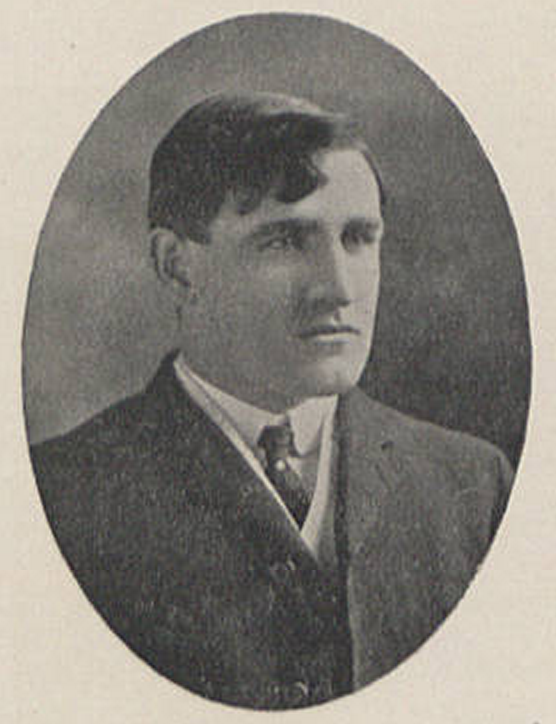
- Forkum pictured in La Vie 1905, Penn State yearbook

Biographical details
- Born: November 23, 1882; Clarion, Pennsylvania, U.S.
- Died: March 19, 1934 (aged 51); Pittsburgh, Pennsylvania, U.S.
- Education: Penn State (1905); Washington & Jefferson

Playing career

Football
- c. 1900: Washington & Jefferson
- 1902–1904: Penn State

Baseball
- 1904–1905: Penn State
- 1905: Sharon Steels

Coaching career (HC unless noted)

Football
- 1905–1906: West Virginia

Baseball
- 1906–1908: West Virginia

Head coaching record
- Overall: 13–6 (football); 59–27–1 (baseball)

Carl Schurz Forkum (November 23, 1882 – March 19, 1934) was an American football and baseball player and coach. He served as the 11th head football coach at West Virginia University and he held that position for two seasons, from 1905 to 1906. His coaching record at West Virginia was 13–6.

Forkum died in 1934 of "complications of diseases" after a month in a hospital. At the time of his death he worked for a steel company and served on the local school board. He was buried in Franklin Cemetery in Franklin, Pennsylvania.

== Head coaching record ==
=== Football ===
Year	Team	Overall	Conference	Standing	Bowl/playoffs
West Virginia Mountaineers (Independent) (1905–1906)
1905	West Virginia	8–1			
1906	West Virginia	5–5			
West Virginia:		13–6			
Total:		13–6			
