= 1905 VMI Keydets football team =

American college football season

1905 VMI Keydets football
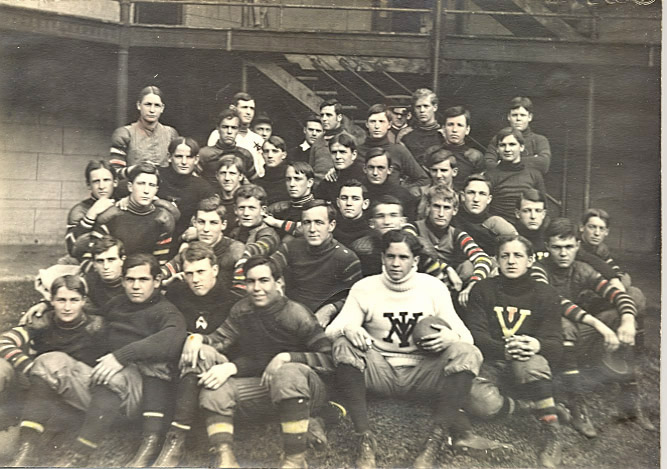
- Conference: Independent
- Record: 2–5–1
- Head coach: Ira Johnson (1st season)

1905 Southern college football independents records
	Conf.			Overall
Team	W	L	T	W		L		T
Tusculum		–		1	–	0	–	0
Stetson		–		4	–	0	–	1
VPI		–		9	–	1	–	0
Navy		–		10	–	1	–	1
Grant		–		6	–	1	–	0
Kentucky University		–		7	–	0	–	3
Oklahoma		–		7	–	2	–	0
Washington and Lee		–		7	–	2	–	0
Texas A&M		–		7	–	2	–	0
Marshall		–		6	–	2	–	0
North Carolina A&M		–		4	–	1	–	1
West Virginia		–		6	–	3	–	0
Kentucky State College		–		6	–	3	–	1
South Carolina		–		4	–	2	–	1
Maryland		–		6	–	4	–	0
Central State Normal		–		4	–	3	–	1
North Carolina		–		4	–	3	–	1
Virginia		–		5	–	4	–	0
Catholic University		–		0	–	0	–	1
TCU		–		4	–	4	–	0
Delaware		–		3	–	4	–	1
The Citadel		–		2	–	3	–	1
Richmond		–		3	–	5	–	2
George Washington		–		3	–	4	–	2
Davidson		–		3	–	4	–	0
Howard (AL)		–		1	–	2	–	1
VMI		–		2	–	5	–	1
Oklahoma A&M		–		1	–	4	–	2
Arkansas		–		2	–	6	–	0
Kendall		–		1	–	3	–	0
Georgetown		–		2	–	7	–	0
Goldey College		–		1	–	4	–	0
Baylor		–		1	–	6	–	0
Louisiana Industrial		–		0	–	1	–	0

The 1905 VMI Keydets football team represented the Virginia Military Institute (VMI) in their 15th season of organized football. VMI had their worst winning percentage in team history, with a 2–5–1 record under coach Ira Johnson.

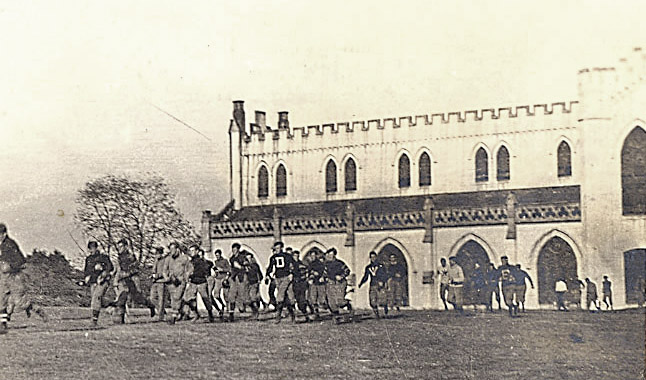
VMI marching on to the Parade Ground for a home game (most likely against Virginia Tech)

== Schedule ==
Date	Opponent	Site	Result	Source
September 29	North Carolina A&M	Lexington, VA	L 0–5	
October 7	at Navy	Worden Field; Annapolis, MD	L 0–29	
October 16	Randolph–Macon	Lexington, VA	T 0–0	
October 28	William & Mary	Lexington, VA (rivalry)	W 23–0	
November 10	Davidson	Lexington, VA	L 6–8	
November 18	vs. North Carolina	Winston-Salem, NC	L 0–17	
November 30	vs. VPI	Richmond, VA (rivalry)	L 0–34	
Unknown	St. John's (MD)	Lexington, VA	W 11–10	
