= 1905 Case football team =

American college football season

1905 Case football
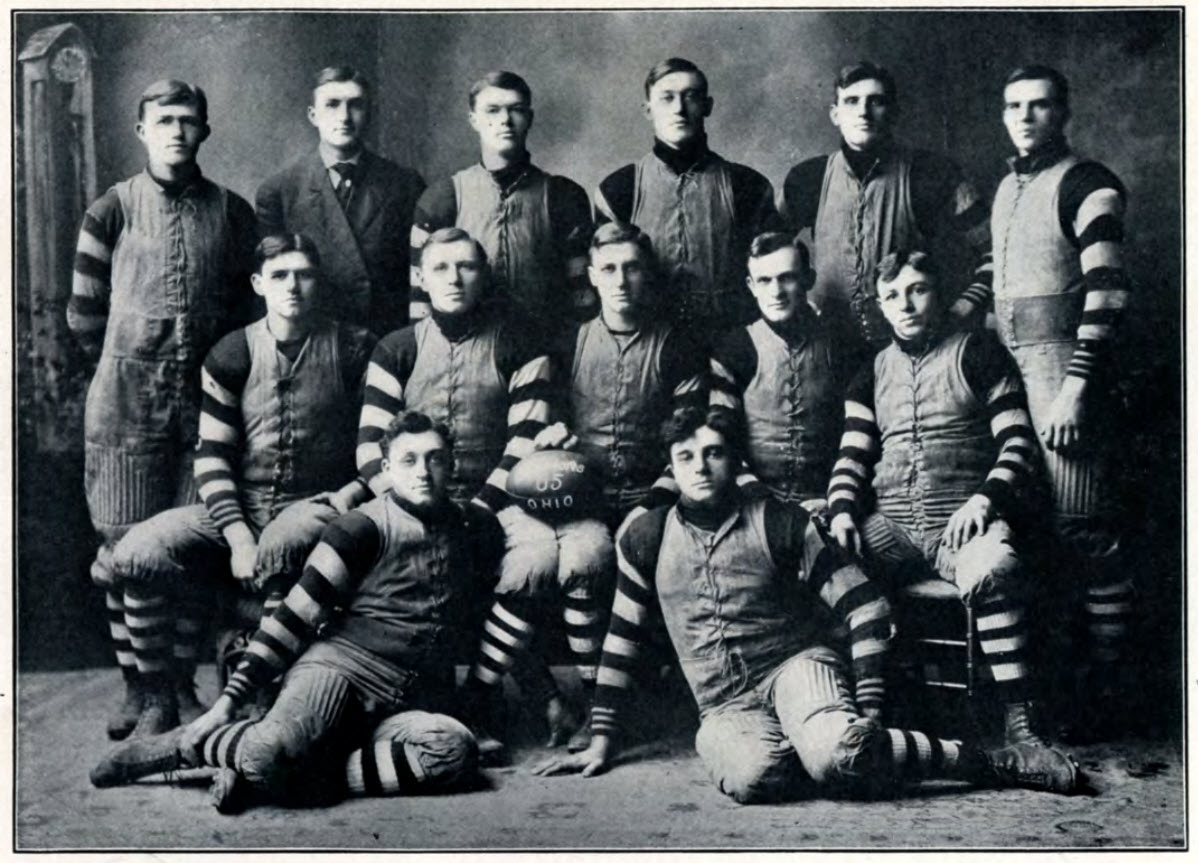

OAC champion
- Conference: Ohio Athletic Conference
- Record: 8–1–1 (4–0–1 OAC)
- Head coach: Joseph Wentworth (4th season)
- Captain: Ira Baker

1905 Ohio Athletic Conference football standings
	Conf.					Overall
Team	W		L		T	W		L		T
Case $	4	–	0	–	1	8	–	1	–	1
Ohio State	2	–	0	–	1	8	–	2	–	2
Oberlin	2	–	3	–	0	3	–	6	–	0
Western Reserve	1	–	2	–	0	6	–	3	–	0
Kenyon	1	–	3	–	0	5	–	5	–	0
Ohio Wesleyan	1	–	3	–	0	4	–	6	–	0
$ – Conference champion

The 1905 Case football team represented the Case School of Applied Science in the American city of Cleveland, Ohio, now a part of Case Western Reserve University, during the 1905 college football season. The team's head coach was Joseph Wentworth. Case won its fourth consecutive Ohio Athletic Conference title.

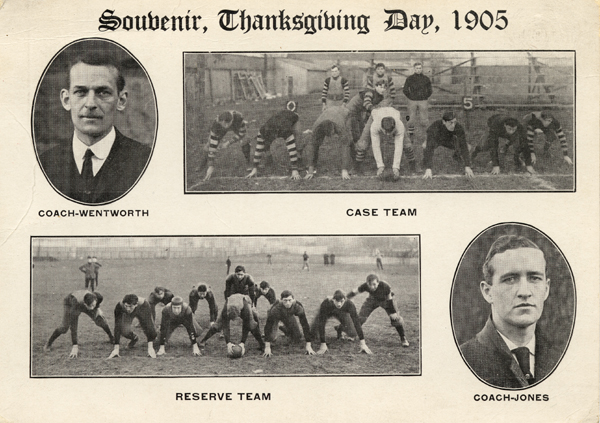
The annual rivalry game featured coaches Joseph Wentworth and Paul Jones

== Schedule ==
Date	Opponent	Site	Result
September 30	at Wooster*	Wooster, OH	W 11–4
October 7	at Michigan*	Regents Field; Ann Arbor, MI	L 0–36
October 14	Mount Union*	Van Horn Field; Cleveland, OH	W 46–0
October 21	Kenyon	Van Horn Field; Cleveland, OH	W 34–12
October 28	at Ohio State	Ohio Field; Columbus, OH	T 0–0
November 4	Denison*	Van Horn Field; Cleveland, OH	W 16–0
November 11	at Oberlin	Oberlin, OH	W 23–0
November 18	Ohio Wesleyan	Van Horn Field; Cleveland, OH	W 35–0
November 25	at Hiram*	Hiram, OH	W 38–0
November 30	Western Reserve	Van Horn Field; Cleveland, OH	W 34–0
*Non-conference game
