= 1905 Ohio State Buckeyes football team =

American college football season

1905 Ohio State Buckeyes football
- Conference: Ohio Athletic Conference
- Record: 8–2–2 (2–0–1 OAC)
- Head coach: Edwin Sweetland (2nd season)
- Home stadium: Ohio Field

1905 Ohio Athletic Conference football standings
	Conf.					Overall
Team	W		L		T	W		L		T
Case $	4	–	0	–	1	8	–	1	–	1
Ohio State	2	–	0	–	1	8	–	2	–	2
Oberlin	2	–	3	–	0	3	–	6	–	0
Western Reserve	1	–	2	–	0	6	–	3	–	0
Kenyon	1	–	3	–	0	5	–	5	–	0
Ohio Wesleyan	1	–	3	–	0	4	–	6	–	0
$ – Conference champion

The 1905 Ohio State Buckeyes football team was an American football team that represented Ohio State University during the 1905 college football season. The Buckeyes compiled an 8–2–2 record and outscored their opponents by a combined total of 197 to 63 in their second season under head coach Edwin Sweetland. Denison forfeited their game on October 14.

== Schedule ==
Date	Opponent	Site	Result	Attendance
September 23	Otterbein*	Ohio Field; Columbus, OH	T 6–6	
September 30	Heidelberg*	Ohio Field; Columbus, OH	W 28–0	
October 4	Muskingum*	Ohio Field; Columbus, OH	W 40–0	
October 7	Wittenberg*	Ohio Field; Columbus, OH	W 17–0	
October 14	Denison*	Ohio Field; Columbus, OH	W 11–0	
October 21	DePauw*	Ohio Field; Columbus, OH	W 32–6	
October 28	Case	Ohio Field; Columbus, OH	T 0–0	
November 4	Kenyon	Ohio Field; Columbus, OH	W 23–0	
November 11	at Michigan*	Regents Field; Ann Arbor, MI (rivalry)	L 0–40	8,000
November 18	Oberlin	Ohio Field; Columbus, OH	W 36–0	
November 25	Wooster*	Ohio Field; Columbus, OH	W 15–0	
November 30	Indiana*	Ohio Field; Columbus, OH	L 0–11	
*Non-conference game
