= Merritt Cooke Jr. =

American football player, coach, engineer, and banker (1884–1967)

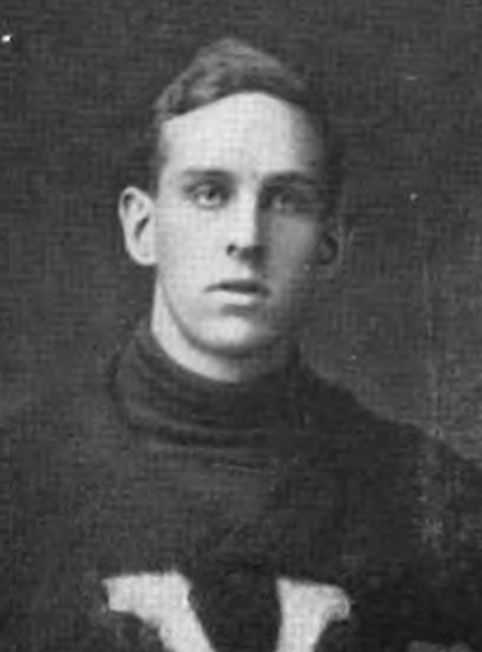
- Cooke pictured in Corks and Curls 1916, Virginia yearbook

Biographical details
- Born: October 24, 1884; Norfolk, Virginia, U.S.
- Died: June 7, 1967 (aged 82); Philadelphia, Pennsylvania, U.S.
- Education: University of Virginia (1906)

Playing career
- 1903–1906: Virginia

Coaching career (HC unless noted)
- 1907: Virginia (assistant)
- 1908: Virginia
- 1909: Virginia (assistant)
- 1919: Virginia (assistant)

Head coaching record
- Overall: 7–0–1

Merritt Todd Cooke Jr. (October 24, 1884 – June 7, 1967) was an American football player, coach, engineer, and banker. He served as the head football coach at the University of Virginia in 1908, compiling a record of 7–0–1. Cooke graduated from the University of Virginia in 1906. He had played on the football team for four years, from 1903 to 1906. In 1910, Cooke was working as an electrical engineer. By 1921, Cooke had moved to Chestnut Hill, Pennsylvania to work as an engineer for Baer, Cooke and Co. He was working as an investment banker in Philadelphia by 1931. Cooke died in 1967 after a long illness.

== Head coaching record ==
Year	Team	Overall	Conference	Standing	Bowl/playoffs
Virginia Orange and Blue (Independent) (1908)
1908	Virginia	7–0–1			
Virginia:		7–0–1			
Total:		7–0–1			
