= 1905 college football season =

American college football season

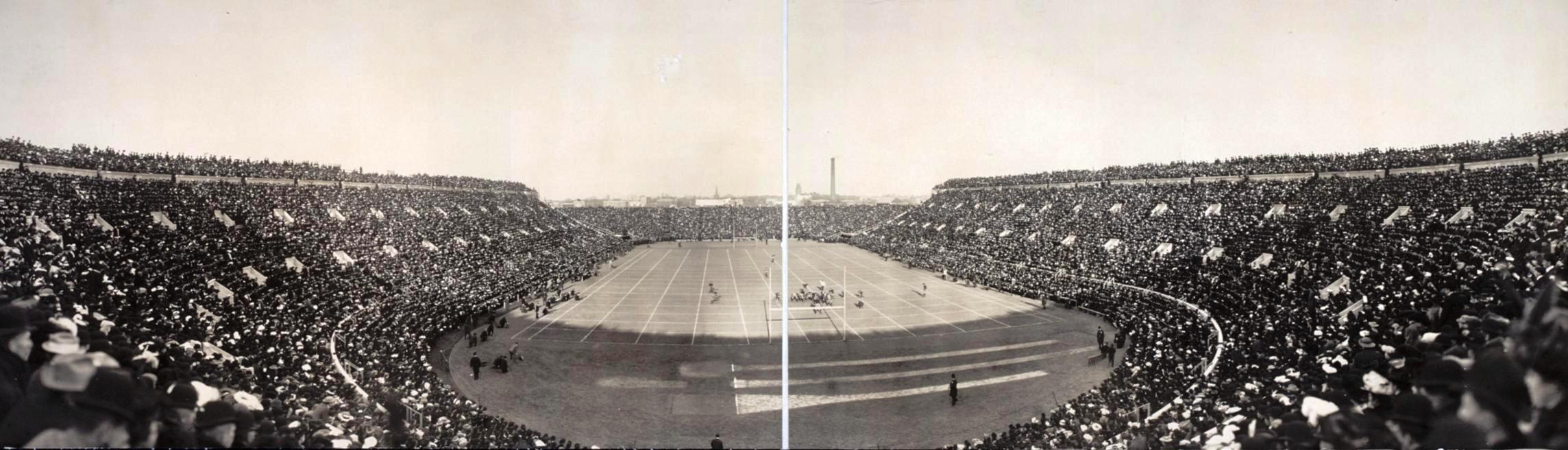
- Harvard–Yale game.
- Total No. of teams: 82
- Regular season: September 16 to December 3
- Champion(s): Chicago; Yale

The 1905 college football season had the Chicago Maroons retroactively named as national champion by the Billingsley Report, the Helms Athletic Foundation, the National Championship Foundation, and the Houlgate System, while Yale was named champion by Parke H. Davis and Caspar Whitney. Chicago finished the season 11–0, while Yale finished 10–0. The Official NCAA Division I Football Records Book listed both Chicago and Yale as having been selected national champions.

== Conference and program changes ==
=== Membership changes ===
School	1904 Conference	1905 Conference
Western State Normal Hilltoppers	Program Established	Independent

== Notable games ==
=== Chicago vs. Michigan game ===
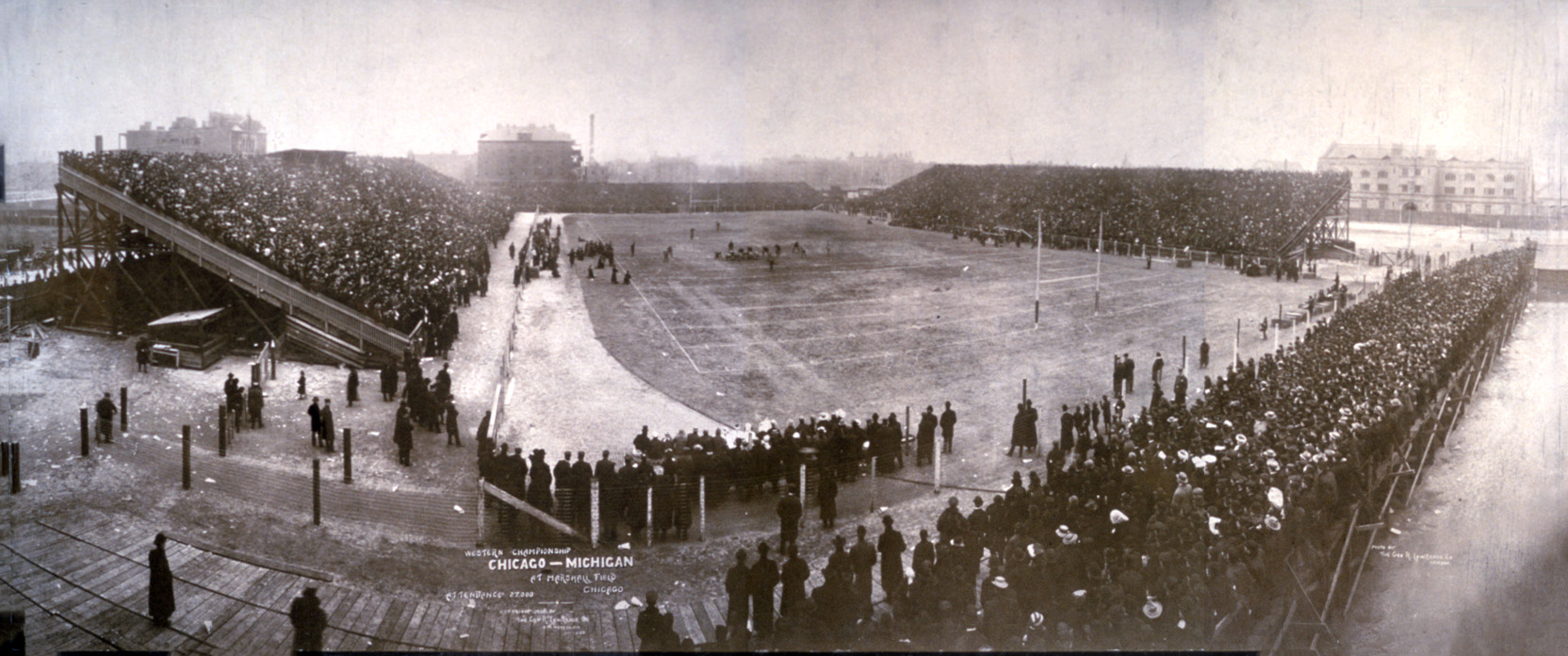

In the final game of the season on November 30, 1905, Amos Alonzo Stagg's Chicago team and Fielding Yost's Michigan squad met in a battle of undefeated Western Conference powerhouses. The teams played at Chicago's Marshall Field in front of 27,000 spectators, at that time the largest crowd to view a football game. Michigan was 12–0 and had a 56-game undefeated streak on the line, while Chicago was 10–0. Chicago had allowed only five points all season, Michigan none.

The game was a punting duel between Chicago's All-American Walter Eckersall and Michigan's John Garrels and was scoreless until early in the third quarter when a Michigan punt and Chicago penalty pinned Chicago inside their own ten-yard line. On third down, as Eckersall attempted to punt, he encountered a fearsome rush, but evaded the Michigan tacklers and was able to scramble to the 22-yard line and a first down. After three more first downs, the drive stalled and Chicago was forced to punt again. Eckersall's booming punt carried into the end zone, where it was caught by Michigan's William Dennison Clark, who attempted to run the ball out. He advanced the ball forward to the one-yard line, but was hit hard by Art Badenoch and then was brought back inside his own end zone by Mark Catlin for a two-point safety. Under the rules of the time, forward progress was not credited, and a ball carrier could be carried backwards or forwards until he was down. The rest of third and fourth quarters continued as a defensive stalemate. Chicago's 2–0 victory snapped Michigan's 56-game unbeaten streak and gave Chicago the consensus national championship for 1905.

As a tragic note to this game, Clark received the blame for the Michigan loss, and in 1932 he shot himself through the heart. In a suicide note to his wife he reportedly expressed the hope that his "final play" would be of some benefit in atoning for his error at Marshall Field.

=== Night football ===
On October 6, 1905, the first night football game west of the Mississippi was played in Wichita, Kansas between Fairmount College (now Wichita State University and Cooper College (now Sterling College). The Coleman Company provided lights for the game.

=== Rule experiment ===
On December 25, 1905, an experimental game was played in Wichita, Kansas between Fairmount College and Washburn University. The game tested several proposed rules changes, including legalizing the forward pass, which made the game the first in football history in which passes were attempted and completed within the rules. The change that most significantly affected the game was requiring the offense to earn a first down by advancing ten yards, rather than the traditional five. Football legend John H. Outland officiated the game and commented, "It seems to me that the distance required in three downs would almost eliminate touchdowns, except through fakes or flukes." The Los Angeles Times reported that there was much kicking and that the game was considered much safer than regular play, but that the new rule was not "conducive to the sport." Some of the rules for this game were based on the Burnside rules which govern the Canadian game. Despite the game's poor offensive output resulting in the disappointment of Outland, attending fans, and the press, the rules changes were indeed instituted for the 1906 season in an effort to reduce injuries and fatalities on the football field. It was not until further rules changes for the 1912 season that teams were allowed four downs to gain ten yards, which remains the game's current down-and-distance system.

== Conference standings ==
=== Major conference standings ===
1905 Southern Intercollegiate Athletic Association football standings
	Conf.					Overall
Team	W		L		T	W		L		T
Vanderbilt $	5	–	0	–	0	7	–	1	–	0
Georgia Tech	5	–	0	–	1	6	–	0	–	1
LSU	2	–	0	–	0	3	–	0	–	0
Sewanee	3	–	1	–	1	4	–	2	–	1
Clemson	3	–	2	–	1	3	–	2	–	1
Cumberland (TN)	3	–	2	–	0	5	–	4	–	0
Alabama	4	–	4	–	0	6	–	4	–	0
Nashville	0	–	0	–	0	0	–	2	–	0
Auburn	2	–	3	–	0	2	–	4	–	0
Mississippi A&M	1	–	4	–	0	3	–	4	–	0
Tulane	0	–	1	–	0	0	–	1	–	0
Ole Miss	0	–	2	–	0	0	–	2	–	0
Tennessee	0	–	4	–	1	3	–	5	–	1
Georgia	0	–	5	–	0	1	–	5	–	0
$ – Conference champion

1905 Southwestern Intercollegiate Athletic Association football standings
	Conf.					Overall
Team	W		L		T	W		L		T
Oklahoma	3	–	0	–	0	7	–	2	–	0
Texas	4	–	1	–	0	5	–	4	–	1
Texas A&M	5	–	1	–	0	7	–	2	–	0
Oklahoma A&M	1	–	1	–	0	1	–	3	–	2
TCU	3	–	4	–	0	4	–	4	–	0
Arkansas	0	–	1	–	0	2	–	6	–	0
Baylor	1	–	6	–	0	1	–	6	–	0
Trinity			–					–

1905 Western Conference football standings
	Conf.					Overall
Team	W		L		T	W		L		T
Chicago $	7	–	0	–	0	11	–	0	–	0
Michigan	2	–	1	–	0	12	–	1	–	0
Minnesota	2	–	1	–	0	10	–	1	–	0
Purdue	1	–	1	–	1	6	–	1	–	1
Wisconsin	1	–	2	–	0	8	–	2	–	0
Indiana	0	–	1	–	1	8	–	1	–	1
Iowa	0	–	2	–	0	8	–	2	–	0
Northwestern	0	–	2	–	0	8	–	2	–	1
Illinois	0	–	3	–	0	5	–	4	–	0
$ – Conference champion

=== Independents ===
1905 Eastern college football independents records
	Conf.			Overall
Team	W	L	T	W		L		T
Yale		–		10	–	0	–	0
Penn		–		12	–	0	–	1
Temple		–		2	–	0	–	1
Dartmouth		–		7	–	1	–	2
Swarthmore		–		7	–	1	–	0
Western U. of Penn.		–		10	–	2	–	0
Princeton		–		8	–	2	–	0
Harvard		–		8	–	2	–	1
Washington & Jefferson		–		10	–	3	–	0
Lafayette		–		7	–	2	–	1
Wesleyan		–		7	–	2	–	1
Carlisle		–		10	–	4	–	0
Penn State		–		8	–	3	–	0
Syracuse		–		8	–	3	–	0
Fordham		–		5	–	2	–	0
Amherst		–		3	–	1	–	2
Holy Cross		–		6	–	3	–	0
Brown		–		7	–	4	–	0
Tufts		–		5	–	3	–	0
Vermont		–		6	–	4	–	1
Cornell		–		6	–	4	–	0
Colgate		–		5	–	4	–	0
Columbia		–		4	–	3	–	2
Army		–		4	–	4	–	1
Bucknell		–		5	–	5	–	0
Dickinson		–		4	–	4	–	0
NYU		–		3	–	3	–	1
Lehigh		–		6	–	7	–	0
Franklin & Marshall		–		4	–	6	–	0
Geneva		–		4	–	6	–	0
New Hampshire		–		2	–	4	–	2
Springfield Training School		–		3	–	5	–	0
Rutgers		–		3	–	6	–	0
Villanova		–		3	–	7	–	0
Drexel		–		1	–	7	–	0

1905 Midwestern college football independents records
	Conf.			Overall
Team	W	L	T	W		L		T
Lincoln (MO)		–		3	–	0	–	0
Detroit College		–		1	–	0	–	0
Kansas		–		10	–	1	–	0
Central Michigan		–		7	–	1	–	0
Doane		–		5	–	1	–	0
Nebraska		–		9	–	2	–	0
Saint Louis		–		7	–	2	–	0
Butler		–		7	–	2	–	1
Kansas State		–		6	–	2	–	0
Northern Illinois State		–		3	–	1	–	1
Carthage		–		4	–	2	–	0
Western Illinois		–		4	–	2	–	0
Iowa State		–		6	–	3	–	0
Washington University		–		7	–	3	–	2
Wittenberg		–		7	–	4	–	0
Heidelberg		–		6	–	4	–	0
Iowa State Normal		–		5	–	3	–	2
Cincinnati		–		5	–	3	–	0
Miami (OH)		–		4	–	3	–	0
Missouri		–		5	–	4	–	0
Notre Dame		–		5	–	4	–	0
Fairmount		–		5	–	4	–	1
Haskell		–		5	–	4	–	1
Lake Forest		–		6	–	5	–	0
Wabash		–		6	–	5	–	0
Drake		–		4	–	4	–	0
Michigan State Normal		–		4	–	4	–	0
Marquette		–		3	–	4	–	0
South Dakota State		–		2	–	3	–	0
Ohio		–		2	–	5	–	2
DePauw		–		3	–	6	–	0
Mount Union		–		2	–	6	–	0
North Dakota Agricultural		–		1	–	4	–	1
Baldwin–Wallace		–		0	–	1	–	0
Chicago P&S		–		0	–	1	–	0
St. Mary's (OH)		–		0	–	3	–	0

1905 Southern college football independents records
	Conf.			Overall
Team	W	L	T	W		L		T
Tusculum		–		1	–	0	–	0
Stetson		–		4	–	0	–	1
VPI		–		9	–	1	–	0
Navy		–		10	–	1	–	1
Grant		–		6	–	1	–	0
Kentucky University		–		7	–	0	–	3
Oklahoma		–		7	–	2	–	0
Washington and Lee		–		7	–	2	–	0
Texas A&M		–		7	–	2	–	0
Marshall		–		6	–	2	–	0
North Carolina A&M		–		4	–	1	–	1
West Virginia		–		6	–	3	–	0
Kentucky State College		–		6	–	3	–	1
South Carolina		–		4	–	2	–	1
Maryland		–		6	–	4	–	0
Central State Normal		–		4	–	3	–	1
North Carolina		–		4	–	3	–	1
Virginia		–		5	–	4	–	0
Catholic University		–		0	–	0	–	1
TCU		–		4	–	4	–	0
Delaware		–		3	–	4	–	1
The Citadel		–		2	–	3	–	1
Richmond		–		3	–	5	–	2
George Washington		–		3	–	4	–	2
Davidson		–		3	–	4	–	0
Howard (AL)		–		1	–	2	–	1
VMI		–		2	–	5	–	1
Oklahoma A&M		–		1	–	4	–	2
Arkansas		–		2	–	6	–	0
Kendall		–		1	–	3	–	0
Georgetown		–		2	–	7	–	0
Goldey College		–		1	–	4	–	0
Baylor		–		1	–	6	–	0
Louisiana Industrial		–		0	–	1	–	0

1905 Far West college football independents records
	Conf.			Overall
Team	W	L	T	W		L		T
Stanford		–		8	–	0	–	0
Idaho		–		5	–	0	–	0
New Mexico A&M		–		3	–	0	–	0
Colorado		–		8	–	1	–	0
New Mexico		–		5	–	1	–	1
Utah		–		6	–	2	–	0
California		–		4	–	1	–	2
Oregon Agricultural		–		6	–	3	–	0
USC		–		6	–	3	–	1
Arizona		–		4	–	2	–	0
Oregon		–		4	–	2	–	2
Washington		–		4	–	2	–	2
Washington State		–		4	–	4	–	0
Utah Agricultural		–		2	–	2	–	1
Wyoming		–		3	–	4	–	0
Montana		–		2	–	3	–	0
Montana Agricultural		–		1	–	2	–	1
Nevada State		–		0	–	3	–	1
Tempe Normal		–		0	–	3	–	0

=== Minor conferences ===
Conference	Champion(s)	Record
Michigan Intercollegiate Athletic Association	Michigan Agricultural	5–0
Ohio Athletic Conference	Case	4–0–1

=== Minor conference standings ===
1905 Michigan Intercollegiate Athletic Association football standings
	Conf.					Overall
Team	W		L		T	W		L		T
Michigan Agricultural $	5	–	0	–	0	9	–	2	–	0
Albion	4	–	1	–	0	5	–	2	–	0
Olivet	3	–	3	–	0	4	–	4	–	0
Kalamazoo	3	–	3	–	0	3	–	6	–	0
Alma	1	–	4	–	0	5	–	4	–	0
Hillsdale	0	–	5	–	0	4	–	5	–	0
$ – Conference champion

1905 Ohio Athletic Conference football standings
	Conf.					Overall
Team	W		L		T	W		L		T
Case $	4	–	0	–	1	8	–	1	–	1
Ohio State	2	–	0	–	1	8	–	2	–	2
Oberlin	2	–	3	–	0	3	–	6	–	0
Western Reserve	1	–	2	–	0	6	–	3	–	0
Kenyon	1	–	3	–	0	5	–	5	–	0
Ohio Wesleyan	1	–	3	–	0	4	–	6	–	0
$ – Conference champion

== Awards and honors ==
=== All-Americans ===
The consensus All-America team included:

Position	Name	Height	Weight (lbs.)	Class	Hometown	Team
QB	Walter Eckersall	5'7"	141	Jr.	Chicago, Illinois	Chicago
QB	Guy Hutchinson					Yale
HB	Jack Hubbard			Sr.		Amherst
HB	Daniel Hurley			Sr..	Charlestown, Massachusetts	Harvard
HB	Howard Roome			Jr.		Yale
HB	Henry Torney			Sr.		Army
FB	James B. McCormick			So.		Princeton
E	Mark Catlin Sr.			Sr.		Chicago
E	Tom Shevlin	5'10"	195	Sr.	Minneapolis, Minnesota	Yale
T	Karl Brill			So.		Harvard
T	Beaton Squires			Sr.		Harvard
G	Francis Burr			Jr.	Brookline, Massachusetts	Harvard
C	Robert Torrey			Sr.	Montclair, New Jersey	Penn
G	Roswell Tripp			Sr.		Yale
T	Otis Lamson			Sr.		Penn
E	Ralph Glaze	5'8"	153	Sr.		Dartmouth

== See also ==
- 1905 College Football All-America Team
