= 1905 Richmond Spiders football team =

American college football season

1905 Richmond Spiders football
- Conference: Eastern Virginia Intercollegiate Athletic Association
- Record: 3–5–2 ( EVIAA)
- Head coach: E. A. Dunlap (1st season)
- Captain: Hudson A. Mench
- Home stadium: Broad Street Park

The 1905 Richmond Spiders football team was an American football team that represented Richmond College—now known as the University of Richmond—as a member of the Eastern Virginia Intercollegiate Athletic Association (EVIAA) during the 1905 college football season. Led by first-year head coach E. A. Dunlap, Richmond compiled a record of 3–5–2.

== Schedule ==
Date	Time	Opponent	Site	Result	Attendance	Source
October 3		at Washington and Lee	Lexington, VA	L 0–34		
October 7		Randolph–Macon	Broad Street Park; Richmond, VA	L 0–35		
October 11	3:30 p.m.	William & Mary	Broad Street Park; Richmond, VA (rivalry)	T 0–0		
October 18		Virginia Boat Club	Broad Street Park; Richmond, VA	W 17–0	1,500	
October 21		William & Mary	Broad Street Park; Richmond, VA	L 0–4		
October 28		at St. John's (MD)	Annapolis, MD	L 0–10		
November 1	3:30 p.m.	Washington and Lee	Broad Street Park; Richmond, VA	L 0–6		
November 11	3:30 p.m.	William & Mary	Broad Street Park; Richmond, VA	W 23–5		
November 16	3:30 p.m.	Richmond Indian School	Broad Street Park; Richmond, VA	W 5–0		
November 25		Randolph–Macon	Richmond, VA	T 18–18		
