= 1904 All-Eastern football team =

American all-star college football team

The 1904 All-Eastern football team consists of American football players chosen by various selectors as the best players at each position among the Eastern colleges and universities during the 1904 college football season.

== All-Eastern selections ==
=== Quarterbacks ===
- Foster Rockwell, Yale (NYS-1; NYH-1; NYP-2)
- Vince Stevenson, Penn (NYS-2; NYP-1)

=== Halfbacks ===
- Lydig Hoyt, Yale (NYS-1; NYH-1; NYP-1)
- Daniel Hurley, Harvard (NYS-1; NYH-2; NYP-1)
- W. E. Metzenthin, Columbia (NYH-1)
- Jack Owsley, Yale (NYS-2)
- Marshall Reynolds, Penn (NYS-2)
- Ritter, Princeton (NYH-2)
- Jack Leavenworth, Yale (NYP-2)
- Edward L. Greene, Penn (NYP-2)

=== Fullbacks ===
- Andy Smith, Penn (NYS-1; NYH-1; NYP-2)
- Philip O. Mills, Harvard (NYS-2; NYP-1)
- Henry Torney, Army (NYH-2)

=== Ends ===
- Tom Shevlin, Yale (NYS-1; NYH-1; NYP-1)
- Garfield Weede, Penn (NYS-1; NYP-2)
- Ralph Glaze, Dartmouth (NYH-1)
- Chester Neal, Yale (NYS-2)
- John S. Hammond, Army (NYS-2; NYP-1)
- Alexander Garfield Gillespie, Army (NYH-2)
- William Wiles Elder, Williams (NYH-2)
- Tooker, Princeton (NYP-2)

=== Tackles ===
- James Hogan, Yale (NYS-1; NYH-1; NYP-1)
- James Cooney, Princeton (NYS-1; NYH-1; NYP-1)
- James Bloomer, Yale (NYS-2)
- Tom Thorp, Columbia (NYS-2; NYH-2; NYP-2)
- Stanard, Princeton (NYH-2; NYP-2)

=== Guards ===
- Roswell Tripp, Yale (NYS-1; NYH-1; NYP-2)
- Frank Piekarski, Princeton (NYS-1; NYH-1; NYP-1)
- Short, Princeton (NYS-2; NYP-1)
- Ralph Kinney, Yale (NYS-2; NYH-2; NYP-2)
- Joseph Gilman, Dartmouth (NYH-2)

=== Centers ===
- Arthur Tipton, Army (NYS-1; NYH-1; NYP-1)
- Clint Roraback, Yale (NYS-2; NYH-2; NYP-2)

== Key ==
- NYS = New York Sun
- NYH = New York Herald
- NYP = New York Press

== See also ==
- 1904 College Football All-America Team
