= 1905 All-Eastern football team =

American all-star college football team

The 1905 All-Eastern football team consists of American football players chosen by various selectors as the best players at each position among the Eastern colleges and universities during the 1905 college football season.

== All-Eastern selections ==
=== Quarterbacks ===
- Guy Hutchinson, Yale (ET-1; PN-1)
- Frank Mount Pleasant, Carlisle (PP-1)
- Vince Stevenson, Penn (EN-1)

=== Halfbacks ===
- Samuel Finley Brown Morse, Yale (PP-1; EN-1; PN-1)
- Howard Roome, Yale (EN-1; ET-1; PN-1)
- Daniel Hurley, Harvard (PP-1)
- Howard Sheble, Penn (ET-1)

=== Fullbacks ===
- Henry Torney, Army (EN-1; PN-1)
- Quill, Harvard (PP-1)
- Jack Hubbard, Amherst (ET-1)

=== Ends ===
- Ralph Glaze, Dartmouth (PP-1; EN-1; ET-1; PN-1)
- Tom Shevlin, Yale (PP-1; ET-1)
- George Levene, Penn (EN-1; PN-1)

=== Tackles ===
- Otis Lamson, Penn (PP-1; EN-1; ET-1; PN-1)
- Karl Brill, Harvard (PP-1; EN-1; PN-1)
- James Cooney, Princeton (ET-1)

=== Guards ===
- Roswell Tripp, Yale (PP-1; EN-1; ET-1; PN-1)
- Elmer Thompson, Cornell (PP-1)
- Francis Burr, Harvard (EN-1)
- J. W. Gage, Dartmouth (ET-1)
- Arthur G. Erwin, Yale (PN-1)

=== Centers ===
- Robert Torrey, Penn (PP-1; EN-1; ET-1; PN-1)

== Key ==
- PP = Pittsburgh Press
- EN = The Evening News
- ET = The Evening Telegram
- PN = Providence News

== See also ==
- 1905 College Football All-America Team
