= Alexander Gillespie (disambiguation) =

Alexander Gillespie (1776–1859) was a Scottish surgeon.

Alexander Gillespie may also refer to:

- Al Gillespie (Alexander M. Gillespie), professor of law in New Zealand
- Alexander Garfield Gillespie (1881–1956), American football player and brigadier general in the United States Army
- George Alexander Gillespie (1872–1956), merchant and political figure in Ontario
- Alexander Gillespie Raymond Jr., known as Alex Raymond, (1909–1956), American cartoonist best known for creating the Flash Gordon comic

== See also ==
- Alexandra Gillespie, historian and professor at the University of Toronto
