= 1905 college football rankings =

- Season: 1905
- Bowl season: 1905–06 bowl games
- End of season champions: Yale

The 1905 college football season rankings included a ranking by Caspar Whitney for The Outing Magazine.

== Caspar Whitney ==
Writing for The Outing Magazine, alongside his All-America Eleven for 1905, Caspar Whitney ranked the top fourteen teams in the country at the conclusion of the season.

Whitney is designated by the National Collegiate Athletic Association (NCAA) as a "major selector" of national championships, and his contemporary rankings in Outing for 1905–1907 are included in the NCAA college football records book.

Rank	Team	Record
1	Yale	10–0
2	Harvard	8–2–1
3	Penn	12–0–1
4	Chicago	11–0
5	Dartmouth	7–1–2
6	Princeton	8–2
7	West Point	4–4–1
8	Annapolis	10–1–1
9	Brown	7–4
10	Carlisle	10–4
11	Amherst	3–1–2
12	Columbia	4–3–2
13	Cornell	6–4
14	Lafayette	7–2–1

== See also ==
- 1905 College Football All-America Team
