= 1911 Massachusetts Aggies football team =

American college football season

1911 Massachusetts Aggies football
- Conference: Athletic League of New England State Colleges
- Record: 2–7 ( Athletic League of New England State Colleges)
- Head coach: Jack Hubbard (1st season)
- Home stadium: Alumni Field

The 1911 Massachusetts Aggies football team represented Massachusetts Agricultural College in the 1911 college football season. The team was coached by Jack Hubbard and played its home games at Alumni Field in Amherst, Massachusetts. The 1911 season was Hubbard's only as head coach of the Aggies. Massachusetts finished the season with a record of 2–7.

== Schedule ==
Date	Opponent	Site	Result	Source
September 23	Rhode Island State	Alumni Field; Amherst, MA	L 0–5	
September 30	at Dartmouth	Alumni Oval; Hanover, NH	L 0–22	
October 7	at Brown	Andrews Field; Providence, RI	L 0–26	
October 14	Worcester Tech	Alumni Field; Amherst, MA	W 12–0	
October 21	at Holy Cross	Fitton Field; Worcester, MA	L 0–6	
October 28	at Tufts	Tufts Athletic Field; Medford, MA	L 0–6	
November 4	at New Hampshire	Manchester, NH (rivalry)	W 8–0	
November 11	at Trinity (CT)	Trinity Field; Hartford, CT	L 6–35	
November 18	at Springfield Training School	Springfield, MA	L 3–12	
