= J. W. Gage =

American football player and coach (1882–1953)

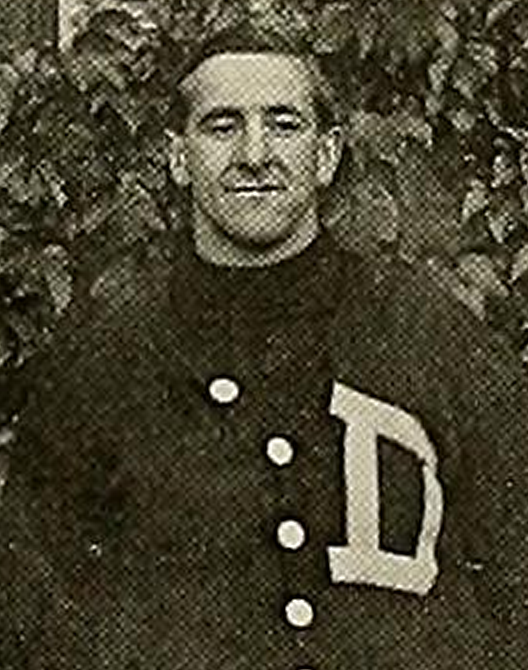
- Gage pictured in The Index 1911, UMass yearbook

Biographical details
- Born: October 12, 1882; Barrington, New Hampshire, U.S.
- Died: January 18, 1953 (aged 70); Portsmouth, New Hampshire, U.S.
- Education: Dartmouth College (1906)

Playing career
- 1903–1905: Dartmouth

Coaching career (HC unless noted)
- 1908: Dartmouth (assistant)
- 1909: Massachusetts

Head coaching record
- Overall: 1–6–2

Jesse Witherspoon Gage (October 12, 1882 – January 18, 1953) was an American football player and coach. He served as the head football coach Massachusetts Agricultural College—now the University of Massachusetts Amherst—in 1909. He compiled a 1–6–2 record that season.

== Head coaching record ==
Year	Team	Overall	Conference	Standing	Bowl/playoffs
Massachusetts Aggies (Independent) (1909)
1909	Massachusetts	1–6–2			
Massachusetts:		1–6–2			
Total:		1–6–2			
