= Karl Brill =

American football player

Playing career
- 1904-1905: Harvard
- Position(s): Tackle

Accomplishments and honors

Awards
- Consensus All-American (1905)

Karl Friedrich Brill was an American football player. He played at the tackle position for the Harvard Crimson football team in 1904 and 1905 and was selected as a first-team All-American in 1905. As a sophomore in December 1905, Brill announced that he would not continue playing football. He said, "I came to Harvard to get a degree as a mining engineer. For the last two years 'Varsity football has played havoc with my studies. Already I have been forced to drop work in my freshman and sophomore years. If I play football again it means that I shall fail to get my degree in four years, and I cannot afford a fifth. It's either play football and fail to get a degree or abandon the gridiron and get a degree." In addition to the toll the game had taken on his studies, Bill denounced football on moral grounds, stating that the human body was not meant to withstand the strain that football demands and adding, "I don't believe the game is right. I dislike it on moral grounds. It is a mere gladiatorial combat. It is brutal throughout."

Brill's family lost its wealth in a financial collapse, and Brill thereafter worked his way through school as a waiter, janitor, and steel mill worker. After receiving an A.B. from Harvard in 1908, Brill returned in 1910 to pursue a Bachelor of Science, also developing a system of minimalist dieting that he believed would allow him to live 125 years. The 1918 Harvard Alumni Bulletin reported that Brill was a captain of engineering stationed at Camp Humphreys in Virginia.
