= Guy Hutchinson =

American football player and businessman (1884–1941)

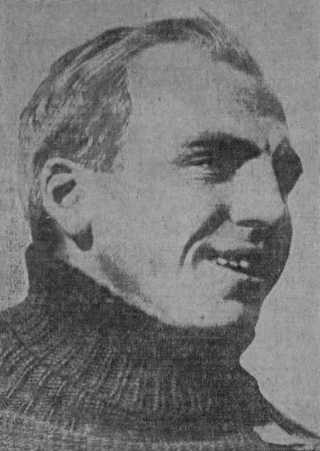

Yale Bulldogs
- Position: Quarterback

Personal information
- Born: February 7, 1884; New York, New York, U.S.
- Died: December 9, 1941 (aged 57); Melbourne, Australia

Career information
- College: Yale (1904–1905)

Awards and highlights
- Consensus All-American (1905)

Guy Hutchinson (February 7, 1884 – December 9, 1941) was an American businessman and college football player. Hutchinson was born in New York City, and later moved to New Jersey. He was a graduate of Yale University in 1906. While attending the Yale, Hutchinson was a star quarterback for the Yale Bulldogs football team, which earned him the honor of All-American in 1905, as well as a member of St. Elmo, a secret society. At the culmination of his professional career, he was president of Proctor & Schwartz Electric Company, which merged with Silex Company to form Proctor Silex in 1960. He died due to pneumonia and is buried in the "Garden of Remembrance," in Springvale, Melbourne, Australia.
