= William Wiles Elder =

American football coach (1885–1960)

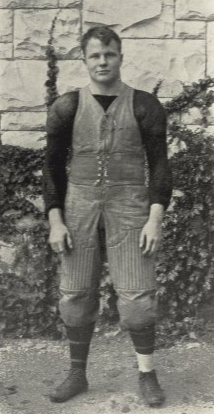
- Elder pictured in Gulielmensian 1908, Williams College yearbook

Biographical details
- Born: July 31, 1885; Richmond, Indiana, U.S.
- Died: March 7, 1960 (aged 74); Gladstone, New Jersey, U.S.

Playing career
- 1904–1907: Williams
- Position: End

Coaching career (HC unless noted)
- 1907: RPI
- 1908: Williams

Head coaching record
- Overall: 7–6–2

William Wiles Elder (July 31, 1885 – March 7, 1960) was an American college football coach. He served as the head football coach at Rensselaer Polytechnic Institute (RPI) in 1907 and at Williams College in 1908, compiling a career coaching record of 7–6–2. Elder graduated from Phillips Exeter Academy in 1904 and from Williams College in 1908. He died on March 7, 1960, in Gladstone, New Jersey.

== Head coaching record ==
Year	Team	Overall	Conference	Standing	Bowl/playoffs
RPI Engineers (Independent) (1907)
1907	RPI	4–3			
RPI:		4–3			
Williams Ephs (Independent) (1908)
1908	Williams	3–3–2			
Williams:		3–3–2			
Total:		7–6–2			
