= Ralph Kinney =

American football player (1881–1956)

Profile
- Positions: Tackle, Guard

Personal information
- Born: September 30, 1881; Cleveland, Ohio, U.S.
- Died: July 1, 1956 (aged 72); Garfield, Utah, U.S.

Career information
- College: Yale (1902–1904)

Awards and highlights
- 2× Consensus All-American (1902, 1904)

Ralph Parsons Kinney Sr. (September 30, 1881 – July 1, 1956) was an American football player. He played college football for the Yale Bulldogs football team from 1902 to 1904 and was selected as a consensus All-American at the tackle position in 1902. He graduated from Yale in 1905. He managed an orange plantation in Puerto Rico in 1908 and also worked in Texas. In January 1909, he was married to Annie Averill of Beaumont, Texas. As of 1920, he was employed by the A.B. Leach & Co. in Cleveland.
