= Joseph Gilman (guard) =

American football player (1883–1933)

Dartmouth Big Green
- Position: Guard

Personal information
- Born: October 4, 1883; Exeter, New Hampshire, U.S.
- Died: September 25, 1933 (aged 49); Newton, Massachusetts, U.S.

Career information
- College: Dartmouth (1904)

Awards and highlights
- Consensus All-American (1904); Second-team All-American (1903)

Joseph Taylor Gilman (October 4, 1883 – September 15, 1933) was an American football player. He played college football at Dartmouth College and was a consensus selection at the guard position on the 1904 College Football All-America Team.

Gilman was born in Exeter, New Hampshire, in 1883. He attended preparatory school at Phillips Exeter Academy before enrolling at Dartmouth College. While at Dartmouth, he played for the Dartmouth Big Green football team and was a consensus first-team selection for the 1904 College Football All-America Team.

After graduating from Dartmouth, Gilman was the manager of Filene's Department Store in Boston. He later became president and general manager of the Boston Garden. He was also president of the Jones, McDuffee & Stratton Corporation. He was married and had two daughters. In 1933, he underwent an operation at the Newton Hospital and died the following week at the age of 50. He was buried at Exeter, New Hampshire.
