= James Bloomer =

American football player (1880–1963)

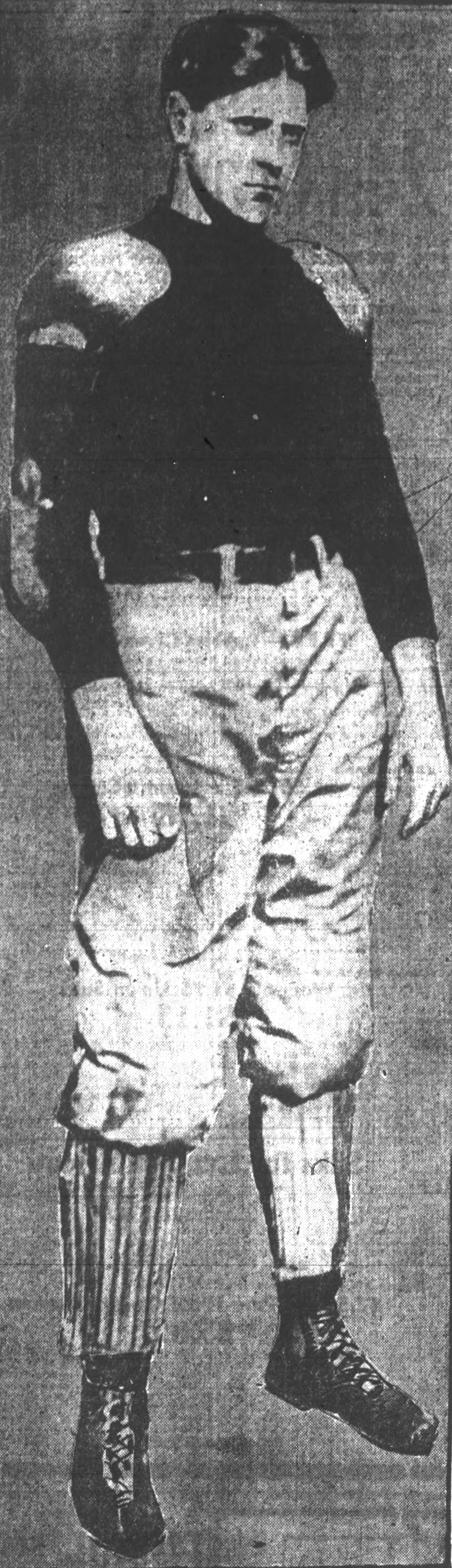

Yale Bulldogs
- Positions: Tackle, Guard

Personal information
- Born: September 17, 1880; Cincinnati, Ohio, U.S.
- Died: November 12, 1963 (aged 83); Garden City, New York, U.S.

Career information
- College: Yale University (1900; 1903–1904)

Awards and highlights
- National champion (1900); 2× Consensus All-American (1900, 1903); Second-team All-American (1904)

James Ralph Bloomer (September 17, 1880 – November 12, 1963) was an American football player and real estate broker. He played college football at Yale University. He was a consensus All-American in 1900 while playing at the tackle position for the Yale Bulldogs football team in 1900, 1903, and 1904.

Bloomer was born in 1880 in Cincinnati, Ohio. He attended St. Paul's School in New Hampshire before enrolling at Yale University. He played at the left tackle position for Yale's undefeated 1900 football team. He was a consensus All-American in both 1900 and 1903. Bloomer left Yale in 1901 due to academic difficulties. A press report in February 1901 noted: "The famous young athlete has had trouble with the faculty ever since he began work here, not through inability to do his work, but through too much attention to athletics." He returned to Yale, graduated in 1905, and served as a football coach at the school from 1906 to 1911.

Bloomer worked in the stock brokerage business beginning in 1905. He formed the New Mexican Era Mines Company and was also the vice president of the San Juan Mines Company. He was also active in the real estate business, serving as the treasurer of the Howard Cole & Co., buying and selling land in Florida, Louisiana, and the West Coast. He later specialized in the sale and rental of mansions located on Long Island's North Shore, an area known as "the Gold Coast."

During World War I, Bloomer served in the United States Army Signal Corps and was assigned to the aviation section.

Bloomer died in November 1963 at his home in Garden City, New York.
