= Foster Rockwell =

American football player (1880–1942)

Biographical details
- Born: August 15, 1880; Vermont, U.S.
- Died: January 26, 1942 (aged 61); Phoenix, Arizona, U.S.

Playing career
- 1902–1904: Yale
- Position: Quarterback

Coaching career (HC unless noted)
- 1906: Yale

Head coaching record
- Overall: 9–0–1

Accomplishments and honors

Championships
- 1 national (1906)

Awards
- 2× Consensus All-American (1902, 1904)

Foster Haven Rockwell (August 15, 1880 – January 26, 1942) was an All-American football player and hotelier. A native of Vermont, Rockwell played football at Yale University and was selected as the quarterback on the 1902 College Football All-America Team and was a member of Skull and Bones. He later served the head football coach at Yale in 1906, leading the team to a national championship. He also coached football at the United States Naval Academy. In 1911, Rockwell moved to Arizona where he owned and operated the Hotel Adams in Phoenix for more than 20 years. He was also the founder of the Arizona Hotel Association. Rockwell died in Phoenix at age 61 in 1942.

== Personal life ==
He is the father of Elizabeth Adams Rockwell.

== Head coaching record ==
Year	Team	Overall	Conference	Standing	Bowl/playoffs
Yale Bulldogs (Independent) (1906)
1906	Yale	9–0–1			
Yale:		9–0–1			
Total:		9–0–1			
National championship Conference title Conference division title or championship game berth
