= 1904 All-America college football team =

Official list of the best college football players of 1904

The 1904 All-America college football team is composed of various organizations that chose All-America college football teams that season. The organizations that chose the teams included Collier's Weekly selected by Walter Camp.

== All-Americans of 1904 ==
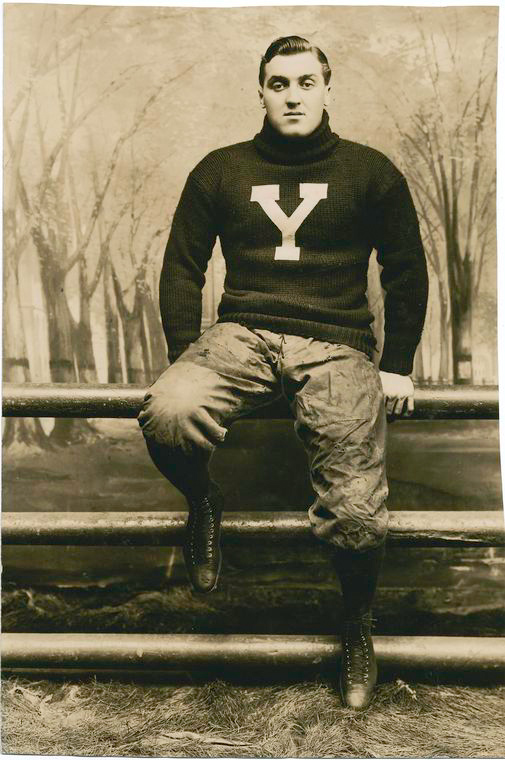
Yale's Tom Shevlin was a four-time All-American

=== Ends ===
- Tom Shevlin, Yale (College Football Hall of Fame) (WC-1; CW-1; NYS-1; NYT; NYH; PR; NYET; PNA; PI)
- Frederick A. Speik, Chicago (CW-1)
- Ralph Glaze, Dartmouth (WC-3; CW-2; NYH; NYET)
- Garfield Weede, Penn (WC-2; NYS-1; PNA-1)
- Chester T. Neal, Yale (NYS-2; NYT; PI)
- Thomas W. Hammond, Army (NYS-2; PR)
- Alexander Garfield Gillespie, Army (WC-2)
- Claude Rothgeb, Illinois (WC-3; FL)
- Russ, Brown (CW-2)
- James Bush, Wisconsin (FL)

=== Tackles ===
- James Hogan, Yale (WC-1; CW-1; NYS-1; NYH; PR; NYET; PNA-1; PI; FL)
- James Cooney, Princeton (WC-1; CW-1; NYS-1; NYT; NYH; PR; NYET; PI)
- Joe Curtis, Michigan (WC-2; FL)
- James Bloomer, Yale (CW-2; NYS-2; NYT; PNA-1; FL [sub])
- Tom Thorp, Columbia (WC-2; CW-2; NYS-2)
- Thomas Alexander Butkiewicz, Penn (WC-3)
- Thomas B. Doe, Army (WC-3)

=== Guards ===
- Frank Piekarski, Penn (WC-1; CW-1; NYS-1; NYT; NYH; PR; NYET; PNA-1; PI)
- Joseph Gilman, Dartmouth (WC-2; CW-1)
- Ralph Kinney, Yale (WC-1; CW-2 NYS-2; NYT; PNA-1)
- Roswell Tripp, Yale (WC-2; CW-2 NYS-1; NYH; NYET; PI)
- Short, Princeton (WC-3; NYS-2; PR)
- Walton W. Thorp, Minnesota (WC-3; FL)
- Charles A. Fairweather, Illinois (FL)

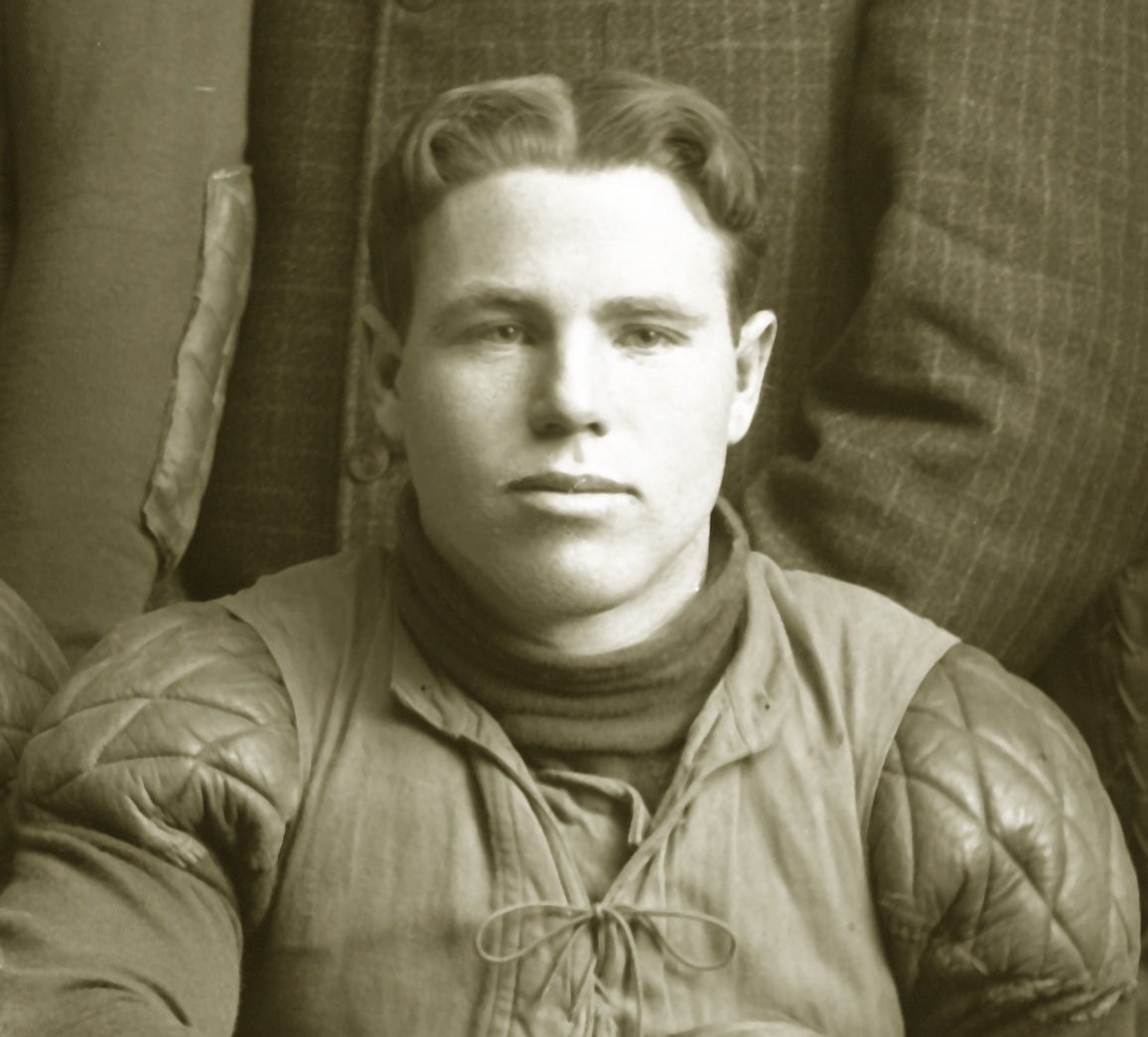
With halfback Willie Heston in the backfield, the Michigan Wolverines compiled a 43–0–1 record between 1901 and 1904.

=== Centers ===
- Arthur Tipton, Army (WC-1; CW-1; NYS-1; NYH; PR)
- Clint Roraback, Yale (WC-2; NYS-2; NYT; NYET; PNA-1; PI)
- Robert Torrey, Penn (WC-3; CW-2)
- John M. Haselwood, Illinois (FL)

=== Quarterbacks ===
- Vince Stevenson, Penn (WC-1; NYS-2; NYT; PR; PNA-1; PI)
- Foster Rockwell, Yale (WC-2; CW-1; NYS-1; NYH; NYET)
- Sigmund Harris, Minnesota (WC-3)
- Dillwyn Parrish Starr, Harvard (CW-2)

=== Halfbacks ===
- Daniel Hurley, Harvard (WC-1; CW-1; NYS-1; NYT; PR; PNA-1; PI)
- Willie Heston, Michigan (College Football Hall of Fame) (WC-1; NYET; FL)
- Lydig Hoyt, Yale (WC-3; CW-2 [fb]; NYS-1; NYH; PR)
- Jack Owsley, Yale (NYS-2)
- Marshall Reynolds, Penn (WC-2; NYS-2; NYT; PNA-1)
- W. E. Metzenthin, Columbia (NYH)
- Jack Hubbard, Amherst (College Football Hall of Fame) (WC-2; CW-2)
- James Vaughn, Dartmouth (WC-3)
- W. C. Leavenworth, Yale (PI)
- Frederick A. Prince, Army (CW-2)
- Walter L. Foulke, Princeton (FL [sub])

=== Fullbacks ===
- Walter Eckersall, Chicago (College Football Hall of Fame) (WC-1 [e]; CW-1; FL [qb])
- Andy Smith, Penn (WC-1; NYS-1; NYH; NYET; PNA-1; PI; FL [hb])
- Henry Torney, Army (CW-1 [hb]; NYT; NYET)
- Philip O. Mills, Harvard (WC-2; NYS-2; PR)
- John R. Bender, Nebraska (WC-3)
- Mark Catlin Sr., Chicago (FL)

== Key ==
NCAA recognized selectors for 1904

- WC = Collier's Weekly as selected by Walter Camp
- CW = Caspar Whitney for Outing magazine

Other selectors

- NYS = New York Sun
- NYT = New York Tribune
- NYH = New York Herald
- PR = New York Press
- NYET = New York Evening Telegram
- PNA = Philadelphia North American
- PI = Philadelphia Inquirer
- FL = Fred Lowenthal, coach of the University of Illinois

Bold = Consensus All-American

- 1 – First-team selection
- 2 – Second-team selection
- 3 – Third-team selection

== See also ==
- 1904 All-Southern college football team
- 1904 All-Western college football team
