= Francis Burr =

American football player (1886–1910)

Profile
- Position: Guard

Personal information
- Born: September 15, 1886; Chestnut Hill, Massachusetts, U.S.
- Died: December 5, 1910 (aged 24); Boston, Massachusetts, U.S.

Career information
- College: Harvard (1905–1908)

Awards and highlights
- 2× Consensus All-American (1905, 1906); Second-team All-American (1907)

Francis Hardon Burr (September 15, 1886 – December 5, 1910) was an American football player. He was a first-team All-American guard in 1906 and captain of the 1908 Harvard Crimson football team. After he died of typhoid fever in 1910, the Francis H. Burr Award was established in his honor.

== Biography ==
Burr was raised in Brookline, Massachusetts, the son of Herman M. Burr. He attended the Phillips-Andover Academy before enrolling at Harvard University in 1905. He was a starter at the guard position for the Harvard football team for four years from 1905 to 1908 and also did the punting and place-kicking for the team. He was selected as a first-team All-American in 1906 and as the captain of the 1908 Harvard football team. In addition to playing four years on the football team, Burr also competed for two years on Harvard's track team, one year on the baseball team and one year on the tennis team. He was also the first marshal of his class and president of his freshman class.

In 1909, he enrolled at Harvard Law School, and in 1910, he became the chief lineman coach at Harvard while in his second year as a law student. In early October 1910, he became ill with typhoid fever. He died at Des Brisay Hospital in December 1910 at age 24 after his third relapse. Burr's funeral was held at the Appleton Chapel in Cambridge, Massachusetts, and all recitations at Harvard were suspended for one hour on the day of his funeral.

In 1914, Burr's friends established the Francis H. Burr Award in his honor. The award was given each year to a senior, selected by the Dean of Harvard College and the Chairman of the Athletic Committee, who "combines as nearly as possible Burr's remarkable qualities of character, leadership, scholarship, and athletic ability." Past recipients of the Francis H. Burr Award include Henry Dunker (1924), J.P. Chase (1927), F. J. Mardulier (1929), Vernon Munroe Jr. (1930), Barry Wood (1931), Richard Ames (1933), Chester Litman (1934), Richard H. Sullivan (1938), Loren G. MacKinney (1941), Gary Singleterry, and Richard K. Hausler.
