= Philip O. Mills =

American football player and doctor

Harvard Crimson
- Position: Fullback

Personal information
- Died: July 25, 1918; France

Career information
- High school: St. Paul's School
- College: Harvard (1902–1904)

Awards and highlights
- Second-team All-American (1904)

Philip O. Mills was an American football player and military officer who was killed in action during World War I. The son of Samuel Meyers Mills Jr., Mills graduated from St. Paul's School in Concord, New Hampshire. He went on to attend Harvard University, where he played three seasons on the Harvard Crimson football team and graduated with the class of 1905. A fullback, Mills was named a second-team All-American by Walter Camp and the New York Sun.(WC-2; NYS-2; PR) In 1905 he was admitted to the New York Stock Exchange and joined the firm of Mills & Co. He was sponsored for membership by fellow Harvard athletes Robert Wrenn and William A. M. Burden Sr.

In 1916, Mills joined the American Volunteer Motor Ambulance Corps and was stationed near Verdun, France. He later returned to the United States and entered a Plattsburg training camp. He was commissioned an infantry Captain in 1917 and sent to France with the 308th Infantry Regiment, 77th Division in April 1918. He died on July 25, 1918, as a result of an accident behind the trench line. Mills was buried in Baccarat, Meurthe-et-Moselle.
