= Otis Lamson =

American football player, coach, and surgeon (1876–1956)

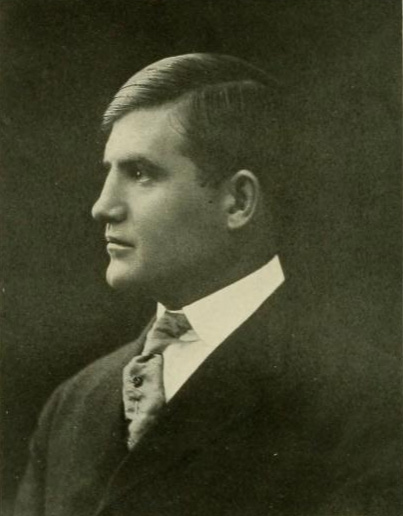
- Lamson pictured in Yackety Yack 1908, North Carolina yearbook

Biographical details
- Born: September 13, 1876; Beetown, Wisconsin, U.S.
- Died: December 11, 1956 (aged 80); Seattle, Washington, U.S.

Playing career
- 1904–1905: Penn
- 1906: Massillon Tigers
- Position: Tackle

Coaching career (HC unless noted)
- 1907: North Carolina

Head coaching record
- Overall: 4–4–1

Accomplishments and honors

Championships
- National (1904)

Awards
- Consensus All-American (1905)

Otis Floyd Lamson (September 13, 1876 – December 11, 1956) was an American football player and coach, and also a surgeon.

== Early life ==
Lamson was born in Beetown, Wisconsin, in 1876.

== Football career ==
Lamson served as the head football coach at the University of North Carolina at Chapel Hill in 1907. Prior to his coaching career, Lamson played college football while attending the University of Pennsylvania. He lettered for the Quakers in 1904 and 1905. In 1905, he earned All-American honors from Walter Camp. In 1906, Lamson was hired by the Massillon Tigers to play for the team in the "Ohio League" championship. During that two-game series, a betting scandal involving the Tigers and their rivals, the Canton Bulldogs, arose.

=== Head coaching record ===
Year	Team	Overall	Conference	Standing	Bowl/playoffs
North Carolina Tar Heels (South Atlantic Intercollegiate Athletic Association) (1907)
1907	North Carolina	4–4–1			
North Carolina:		4–4–1			
Total:		4–4–1			

== Medical career ==
Lamson graduated from the University of Pennsylvania Medical School in 1907, after which he practiced medicine in Seattle for 41 years, until his retirement in 1952. He was one of the best-known surgeons in the western United States. After his internship at Mercy Hospital in Denver, he received a fellowship to work at the Mayo Clinic. He then served at Doctors Hospital and Columbus Hospital in Seattle. Lamson also served as the president of the North Pacific Surgical Association, and he co-founded the Pacific Coast Surgical Association. His professional interests included the treatment of achalasia.
