= Howard Roome =

American football player

Profile
- Position: Halfback

Personal information
- Died: April 1931

Career information
- College: Yale (1905)

Awards and highlights
- Consensus All-American (1905)

Howard Le Chevalier Roome ( – April 1931) was an American football player. He played halfback for Yale University championship teams of 1905 and 1906 and was selected by Walter Camp as a first-team All-American in 1905. Roome graduated from Yale in 1907 and married amateur golfer Florence Newman Ayres in April 1909. In May 1920, Roome won a $4,100 bet by climbing the 47 flights of stairs from the sub-cellar to the cupola of the Equitable Building in New York in 8 minutes, 52 seconds. He later went into the real estate business and lived in Westbury, New York. He died in April 1931.
