= 1905 All-America college football team =

Official list of the best college football players of 1905

The 1905 All-America college football team is composed of college football players who were selected as All-Americans by various organizations and writers that chose All-America college football teams for the 1905 college football season. The organizations that chose the teams included Walter Camp for Collier's Weekly and Caspar Whitney for Outing Magazine.

== All-American selections for 1905 ==
=== Ends ===
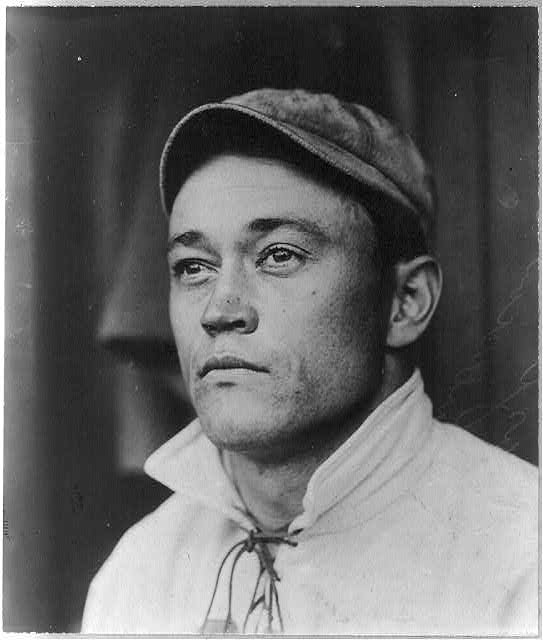
Ralph Glaze of Dartmouth.

- **Mark Catlin Sr.**, Chicago (WC-2; CW-1)
- **Ralph Glaze**, Dartmouth (WC-1; NYEP; NYT; NYW)
- **Thomas Shevlin**, Yale (College Football Hall of Fame) (WC-1; CW-1; NYEP; NYT; NYG)
- Izzy Levene, Penn (WC-3; NYW; NYG)
- Bobby Marshall, Minnesota (WC-2)
- Norman Tooker, Princeton (WC-3)

=== Tackles ===
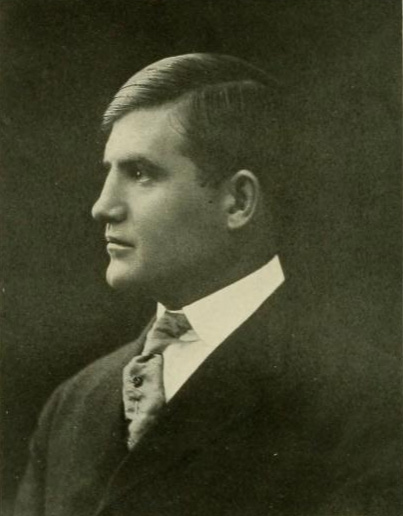
Otis Lamson of Penn.

- **Karl Brill**, Harvard (CW-1; NYW)
- **Otis Lamson**, Penn (WC-1; CW-1; NYEP; NYW; NYG; NYEP; NYT; NYG)
- **Beaton Squires**, Harvard (WC-1)
- James Cooney, Princeton (NYT)
- Robert Forbes, Yale (WC-2)
- Joe Curtis, Michigan (WC-2)
- Wilson Bertke, Wisconsin (WC-3)
- Lucius Horatio Biglow, Yale (WC-3)

=== Guards ===
- **Francis Burr**, Harvard (WC-1; CW-1; NYW)
- **Roswell Tripp**, Yale (WC-1; CW-1; NYEP; NYT; NYW)
- F. Hobson, Penn (NYEP; NYG)
- Harry von Kersburg, Harvard (NYG)
- Elmer Thompson, Cornell (WC-2)
- Henry Schulte, Michigan (WC-2)
- Albert M. Fletcher, Brown (WC-3)
- Tiny Maxwell, Swarthmore (College Football Hall of Fame) (WC-3; NYT)

=== Centers ===
- **Robert Torrey**, Penn (WC-1; CW-1; NYEP; NYT; NYW; NYG)
- Carl S. Flanders, Yale (WC-2)
- Burton Pike Gale, Chicago (WC-3)

=== Quarterbacks ===
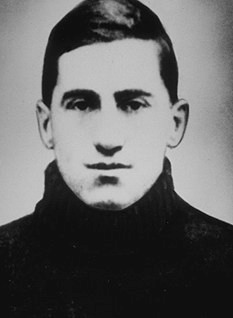
Walter Eckersall of Chicago.

- **Walter Eckersall**, Chicago (WC-1; CW-1 [fb]; NYEP)
- **Guy Hutchinson**, Yale (WC-2; CW-1; NYT; NYG)
- Vince Stevenson, Penn (College Football Hall of Fame) (NYW)
- Wilmer G. Crowell, Swarthmore (WC-3)

=== Halfbacks ===
- **Jack Hubbard**, Amherst (WC-1)
- **Daniel Hurley**, Harvard (CW-1)
- **Howard Roome**, Yale (WC-1; NYT; NYW; NYG)
- **Henry Torney**, Army (CW-1; NYT [fb]; NYW [fb]; NYG [fb])
- Thomas Hammond, Michigan (WC-3; NYEP)
- David Main, Dartmouth (NYEP)
- George Walder, Cornell (NYG)
- Samuel Finley Brown Morse, Yale (WC-2; NYT; NYW)
- H. W. Sheble, Penn (WC-2)
- A. H. Douglas, Navy (CW-2)
- Albion Findlay, Wisconsin (WC-3)

=== Fullbacks ===
- **James B. McCormick**, Princeton (WC-1)
- A. Rex Flinn, Yale (NYEP)
- Philip von Saltza, Columbia (WC-2)
- Hugo Bezdek, Chicago (College Football Hall of Fame) (WC-3)

=== Key ===
NCAA recognized selectors for 1905

- WC = Collier's Weekly as selected by Walter Camp
- CW = Caspar Whitney for Outing magazine.

Other selectors

- NYEP = New York Evening Post
- NYT = New York Times
- NYW = New York World
- NYG = New York Globe

Bold = Consensus All-American

- 1 – First-team selection
- 2 – Second-team selection
- 3 – Third-team selection

== See also ==
- 1905 All-Southern college football team
- 1905 All-Western college football team
