= Jack Hubbard (American football) =

American football player and coach (1886–1978)

Biographical details
- Born: February 6, 1886; Hatfield, Massachusetts, U.S.
- Died: April 2, 1978 (aged 92); Torrington, Connecticut, U.S.

Playing career
- 1903–1906: Amherst
- Position: Halfback

Coaching career (HC unless noted)
- 1907–1909: Amherst
- 1911: Massachusetts

Head coaching record
- Overall: 9–20–4

Accomplishments and honors

Awards
- Consensus All-American (1905); Second-team All-American (1904)
- College Football Hall of Fame; Inducted in 1966 (profile)

John H. Hubbard (February 6, 1886 – April 2, 1978) was an American college football player and coach. He played as a halfback at Amherst College from 1903 to 1906. Hubbard served as the head football coach at Amherst from 1907 to 1909 and at Massachusetts Agricultural College—now the University of Massachusetts Amherst—in 1911. He was elected to the College Football Hall of Fame as a player in 1966. Hubbard died on April 2, 1978, at the Adams House Health Care Center in Torrington, Connecticut.

== Head coaching record ==
Year	Team	Overall	Conference	Standing	Bowl/playoffs
Amherst (Independent) (1907–1909)
1907	Amherst	3–4–1			
1908	Amherst	3–3–2			
1909	Amherst	1–6–1			
Amherst:		7–13–4			
Massachusetts Aggies (Independent) (1911)
1911	Massachusetts	2–7			
Massachusetts:		2–7			
Total:		9–20–4			
