= Frank Piekarski =

American football player, coach, and judge (1879–1951)

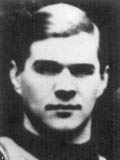

Biographical details
- Born: August 17, 1879; Nanticoke, Pennsylvania, U.S.
- Died: August 15, 1951 (aged 71); Pittsburgh, Pennsylvania, U.S.

Playing career
- 1901–1904: Penn
- Position: Guard

Coaching career (HC unless noted)
- 1905–1907: Washington & Jefferson
- 1914: Penn (line)

Head coaching record
- Overall: 26–7

Accomplishments and honors

Awards
- Consensus All-American (1904); Third-team All-American (1903)

Frank Anthony Piekarski (August 17, 1879 – August 15, 1951) was an American college football player and coach who later served as a judge in Pennsylvania. He attended the University of Pennsylvania, where he played football for the Penn Quakers as a guard from 1901 to 1904. Piekarski was a third-team selection to the 1903 College Football All-America Team and a consensus first-team pick on the 1904 College Football All-America Team. He was among the first Polish-Americans to gain recognition in college football.

Following his graduation from Penn, Piekarski served as the head football coach at Washington & Jefferson College from 1905 to 1907, leading the Red and Black to a record of 25–7 in three seasons. In 1914 he returned to his alma mater, Penn, as an assistant football coach in charge of the linemen under head coach George H. Brooke.

Piekarski was also a lawyer. In 1933, he became a judge in Allegheny County, Pennsylvania. Piekarski died in 1951 at Pittsburgh Hospital in Pittsburgh. In 2005, he was named to the National Polish-American Sports Hall of Fame.

== Head coaching record ==
Year	Team	Overall	Conference	Standing	Bowl/playoffs
Washington & Jefferson Red and Black (Independent) (1905–1907)
1905	Washington & Jefferson	10–3			
1906	Washington & Jefferson	9–2			
1907	Washington & Jefferson	7–2			
Washington & Jefferson:		26–7			
Total:		26–7			
