= Arthur Tipton =

American football player and U.S. Army officer (1882–1942)

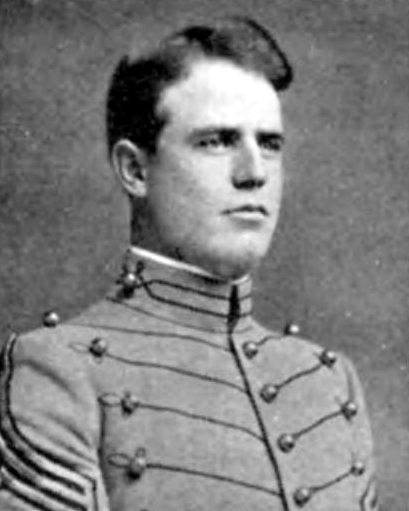
- Tipton at West Point in 1905

Army Black Knights
- Position: Center

Personal information
- Born: June 5, 1882; Las Vegas, New Mexico Territory
- Died: January 15, 1942 (aged 59); Gainesville, Florida, U.S.

Career information
- College: Army (1903–1904)

Awards and highlights
- Consensus All-American (1904)

Arthur Charles "Bull" Tipton (June 5, 1882 – January 15, 1942) was an American football player and United States Army officer. He was a consensus first-team selection to the 1904 College Football All-America Team.

== Early life ==
Tipton was born on June 5, 1882, at Las Vegas in the New Mexico Territory. He attended public schools in Las Vegas, Sacred Heart College in Denver, Braden's Preparatory School.

== West Point ==
In 1901, Tipton enrolled at the United States Military Academy in West Point, New York. He graduated in 1905.

While attending West Point, Tipton played for the Army Black Knights football team from 1903 to 1904 and was selected as a consensus first-team center on the 1904 College Football All-America Team. During the 1904 game against Navy, Tipton kicked a loose ball down the field and fell on it for a touchdown after it crossed the goal line. In response to his maneuver, the Rules Committee amended the rules to disallow such a play.

== Military career ==
After graduating from the academy, Tipton served in the United States Army. He was initially commissioned as a second lieutenant in the 5th Infantry and resigned from the Army in September 1909. He thereafter became engaged in fruit and dairy farming in Sparta Township, New Jersey.

In May 1917, when the United States entered World War I, Tipton returned to the Army as a major, adjutant general, in the reserve corps. He entered active service in July 1917 and was initially assigned to the Headquarters Central Department in Chicago. From September 1917 to September 1918, he served with the 155th Infantry Brigade at Camp Dix in New Jersey and then in France. From October 1918 to January 1919, he was a student officer at the Army General Staff College in Langres, France. From January to April 1919, he served as the Assistant Chief of Staff, G-3, 78th Division. He was promoted to the rank of lieutenant-colonel, adjutant general in May 1919 and major of the infantry in July 1920.

After World War I, Tipton continued to serve as G-3, 78th Division, under Major General J. H. McRae, at Fort Benjamin Harrison in Indiana and at Fort Hayes in Ohio. He graduated from the Command and General Staff School in 1924 and served for five years as a professor of military science and tactics at the University of Florida in Gainesville, Florida. He was also commandant of the R.O.T.C. program at the University of Florida. From 1931 to 1934, he was in charge of organized reserves at Greensboro, North Carolina.

Tipton retired from the military due to service-related disability in September 1934, holding the rank of lieutenant colonel.

== Family and later years ==
Tipton was married at Newark, New Jersey, in September 1907 to Theodora Coe Tipton. They had two daughters. In his later years, Tipton resided in Saint Petersburg, Florida. In approximately 1937, he moved to Gainesville, Florida, where he had previously been the commandant of the R.O.T.C. program. Tipton died from a heart attack on January 15, 1942, at age 59 in Gainesville.
