= Roswell Tripp =

American football player (1884–1962)

Biographical details
- Born: January 1884; Chicago, Illinois, U.S.
- Died: December 1962 (aged 78)

Playing career
- 1902: Chicago
- 1904-1905: Yale
- Position: Guard

Accomplishments and honors

Awards
- Consensus All-American (1905); Second-team All-American (1904)

Roswell Tripp (January 1884 – December 1962) was an American football player.

Tripp attended The Hill School at Pottstown, Pennsylvania, where he drew his attention for his talent as a football player. Tripp enrolled at the University of Chicago and played at the tackle for Amos Alonzo Stagg's 1902 football team. In January 1903, Tripp transferred to Yale University, where he played guard for Yale University's football teams in 1904 and 1905 after sitting out the 1903 season. He was captain of Yale's championship team of 1905, and was selected by Walter Camp as a first-team All-American in 1905. He later worked as a stockbroker. He died in December 1962, at the age of 78.
