= Henry Torney =

American football player (1884–1942)

Henry W. Torney
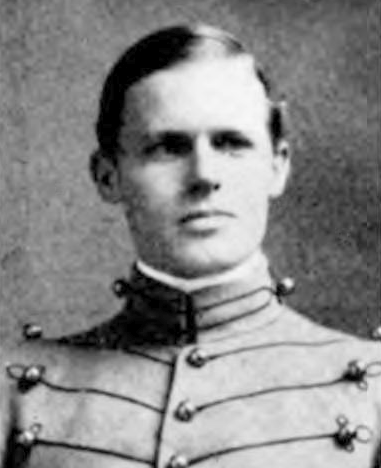
- At West Point in 1906
- Born: November 12, 1881; New Mexico, U.S.
- Died: October 22, 1942 (aged 60); New York, New York, U.S.
- Occupations: Football player, industrial engineer
- Football career

Army Black Knights
- Positions: Halfback, fullback

Career information
- College: Cornell (1901); Army (1902–1905)

Awards and highlights
- 2× Consensus All-American (1904, 1905)

Henry Walter Torney (November 12, 1881 – October 22, 1942) was an American football player and industrial engineer. He was an All-American at the halfback and fullback positions in 1904 and 1905 while attending the United States Military Academy. He later became an industrial engineer.

== Biography ==
Torney was the son of George H. Torney, the Surgeon General of the United States Army. He played college football and was a member of the crew at Cornell from 1901 to 1902. He was admitted to the United States Military Academy at West Point, New York, in June 1902. He played football for the Army football team, he was selected as a first-team All-American in 1904 (as a halfback) and 1905 (as a fullback). In 1904, Torney ran 105 yards against Yale. Torney's final game for Army was the 1905 Army-Navy game, played at Princeton, New Jersey, in front of President Theodore Roosevelt, former President Grover Cleveland, and future President Woodrow Wilson. Torney scored Army's only touchdown in a 6-6 tie.

Torney graduated from West Point in June 1906 and served in the artillery corps. He was stationed at Fort Totten, New York, from 1906 to 1907 and at Fort Hancock, New Jersey, from 1908 to 1909. He was transferred to the recruiting service in New York City in December 1910.

In January 1910, Torney, then a first lieutenant in the U.S. Army, was arrested in New York City as part of a protest with the Shirtwaist Strikers. Torney was dating Inez Milholland, the noted suffragette who was then a law student at New York University, and had attended the protest with her. The charges against Torney and Milholland were later dropped, but the arrests of Milholland and Torney drew extensive press coverage that raised questions about the role of the police in labor disputes. New York Mayor William Jay Gaynor subsequently rebuked the "police dictators" for their conduct in making the arrests and instructed the police that they were not to take sides in labor disputes.

In 1912, Torney transferred from active duty to the Army Reserve. During World War I, he was called back to active duty in the Army Air Service. Torney served from 1917 to 1919, attaining the rank of major.

Torney married Bertha Benedict, the daughter of Seelye Benedict, on December 27, 1913, the same day that his father died. Torney went on to become a successful industrial engineer with a "palatial summer residence" at Southampton, Long Island. In 1932, Torney, described in the press as a "millionaire industrial engineer," was the target of a blackmail plot by the former gardener at his Southampton estate. The Federal Bureau of Investigation arrested the blackmailer, and the story was featured in a lengthy feature article promoting the investigative prowess of the FBI's "G-Men."

Torney died at Doctors Hospital in New York on October 22, 1942. He was buried at the West Point Cemetery.
