= Tom Shevlin =

American college football player and businessman (1883–1915)

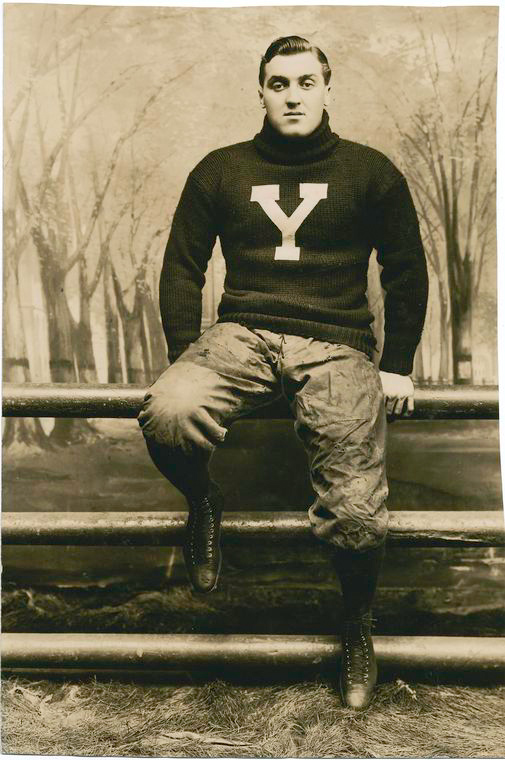
- Shevlin, c. 1905

Profile
- Position: End

Personal information
- Born: March 1, 1883; Muskegon, Michigan, U.S.
- Died: December 29, 1915 (aged 32); Minneapolis, Minnesota, U.S.

Career information
- High school: The Hill School
- College: Yale

Career history
- 1906–1909: Minnesota (assistant)
- 1910–1915: Yale (assistant)

Awards and highlights
- 3× Consensus All-American (1902, 1904, 1905); Second-team All-American (1903); 2× National champion (1902, 1905); Camp All-time All-America team
- College Football Hall of Fame (Class of 1954)

Thomas Leonard Shevlin (March 1, 1883 – December 29, 1915) was an American college football player and coach at Yale University and a businessman. He was a consensus All-American for three of his four years, selected a first-team All-American by some selector in all. He was inducted into the College Football Hall of Fame in 1954.

== Early life and education ==
Shevlin was born in Muskegon, Michigan, the son of Thomas Henry and Alice Ann (Hall) Shevlin. His family moved to Minneapolis, Minnesota when he was a young boy, and his father became successful in the lumber business and active in Republican Party politics. Shevlin attended The Hill School in Pottstown, Pennsylvania, and then enrolled at Yale University.

=== Yale University ===
Shevlin attended Yale University from 1902 to 1906. He became best known as a football player, but also competed in track and field, baseball, boxing, and hockey. By 1905, Shevlin had a national reputation as Yale's premier athlete and "unquestionably one of the most remarkable all round athletes in America." He was six feet tall and weighed "190 pounds when in training and 212 pounds out of training. One newspaper account described his athletic prowess as follows:

The famous athlete has won a "Y" in three branches of sport and might win two or three more if he had time to devote to that many games. As left fielder on the baseball team, as hammer thrower on the track team and a football player Shevlin has been found worthy of the coveted letter. He also is a good sprinter, basketball player, tennis expert and boxer. ... He can run 100 yards in less than 11 seconds and could easily make the varsity tennis and basket ball teams if he wished. He is not on the golf team simply because he has not the time to devote to the game.

==== Yale Bulldogs football ====
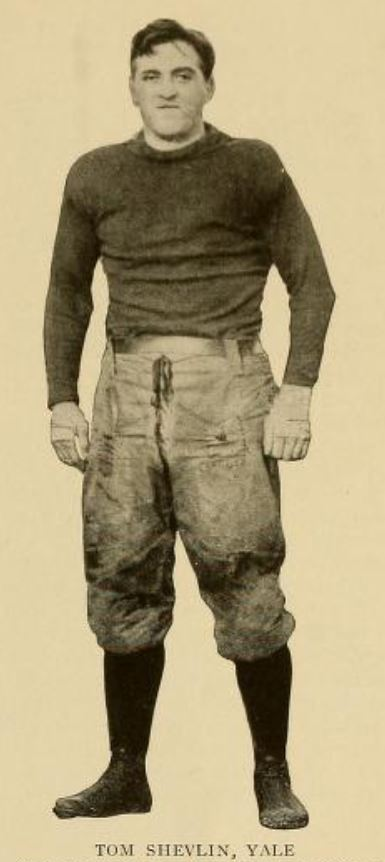
Shevlin with the Yale Bulldogs

Shevlin played for Yale's varsity football team from 1902 to 1905. He was selected as an All-American at the end position each year, making him one of a handful of four-time All-American in the history of college football. During his time at Yale, the football team defeated Princeton three times and Harvard four times. As a senior in 1905, Shevlin was captain of the Yale football team that has been called "the best aggregation that ever represented the school." It was said that in his years at Yale, "not an opposing rushing attack has gained a first down around his end." The 1905 Yale team went 10–0, outscored its opponents 227–4, and was picked as co-national champions with the University of Chicago. For his accomplishments in leading the football team, Shevlin became known as the "miracle man of football".

In 1905, college football came under fire by university presidents and others who felt that its violent nature was a negative influence on institutions of higher learning. Shevlin spoke in defense of the sport. He noted that, though he loved all forms of sport, football was a particular favorite: "There's something primitive about football that I like. You get down to the fundamentals, as it were. Football is a war game. You have to plan it like a battle. It requires more brains to play it and develop it than any other game ..."

The Atlanta Constitution wrote of Shevlin: "Probably no more sensational athlete ever played on Yale teams than Shevlin. He was an all-round star, being identified with virtually every branch of sport." At the close of his football career with Yale, The Washington Post wrote:

Whether Capt. Tom Shevlin can be induced to come back to act as head coach is not sure. He has planned to go into the lumber business in the West, but strong pressure will be brought to bear to induce him to return to Yale as coach. His year as captain closes with him one of the most popular leaders who ever headed a Yale team.

==== Yale Bulldogs track and field ====
While best known for football, Shevlin also received varsity letters at Yale as a hammer thrower for the track and field team. He won the 1903 collegiate hammer throw competition with a throw of 156 feet, 3 inches, and set the world's record in the 12-pound hammer throw. In 1904, he travelled to England, Scotland and Ireland to compete in international track and field competition. In 1905, Shevlin hired world's champion John Flanagan to come to New Haven as his personal trainer, helping Shevlin reach a personal record with a 160-foot throw of the hammer.

=== Boxing ===
Shevlin also developed an interest in boxing. In 1904, heavyweight boxing champion "Gentlemen Jim" Corbett agreed to a three-round bout with Shevlin at the Yale gymnasium. Corbett won the match, but praised Shevlin afterward: "He hits the hardest blow and is the best man at foot work I ever met with the exception of [James J.] Jeffries." Some in the press expressed concern that Shevlin had taken up a sport that was uncommon in the Ivy League and wondered whether "society will drop" Shevlin "because he has been taking to the gloves."

=== Automobile racing ===
While at Yale, Shevlin also developed a passion for the new sport of automobile racing. In early 1905, he purchased a $15,000 French automobile and spent considerable time racing it throughout New England. He twice left New Haven racing to beat the express train to Meriden, Connecticut. On the second occasion, the mayor of Meriden saw Shevlin "whirling riotously into town" and set the police after him. A Meriden police officer was tasked with finding Shevlin and followed his trail for two days. The pursuit was unsuccessful, but Shevlin turned himself in after hearing that a warrant had been issued for his arrest. Shevlin paid a $40 fine and returned to New Haven. Shevlin drew a further fine when he and a friend drove an automobile "at furious pace" up and down past the dormitories of Smith College as young women "waved responsively to the reckless autoing."

=== Reputation for spending ===
As exemplified in his purchase of the $15,000 French automobile and hiring the world's champion hammer thrower as a trainer, Shevlin developed a reputation as a free spender. He was known for his "flashy clothes and his loud manner" and for being "a bit wild" in his four years at Yale. The New Haven Register wrote that, even at a school attended by the country's elites, Shevlin had set a record for spending:

He is credited with having spent more money than any undergrad ever spent in the course of a year, $17,000 is the figure given. He bought everything—flowers, taxicabs, autos (they were just coming in when Tom was in college), clothes (and such clothes!), jewelry, canes, dinners, and their accompaniments—there wasn't a thing that was untouched by Tom's versatile and seemingly bottomless purse.

Shevlin did not spend only on himself. He reportedly helped "many a poor fellow, struggling to get an education," sometimes anonymously leaving $1,000 on the desk of a classmate in need.

=== Snubbing at "tap-day" ===
At the conclusion of the academic year, Yale held its annual "tap-day" custom in which juniors were selected for the school's three senior societies—Skull and Bones, Scroll and Key, and Wolf's Head. By tradition, the captain of Yale's football team was tapped to join Skull and Bones. However, in May 1905, Shevlin was snubbed by all three societies, resulting in a public furor. After the public snubbing, Shevlin reportedly "left the campus and whirled away in his automobile." One newspaper speculated that Shevlin's automobile was the reason for the snub:

Can it be true that Tom Shevlin, Jr. ... missed being "tapped" for one of the senior societies merely because he had just become the possessor of a fine, new automobile and was putting on a good deal of style with it? It is true that he was not "tapped;" equally true that he whirled up to the "tapping" place in a splendid automobile, but why should the possession of a 40-horse power horseless wagon militate against a student who desires to be "tapped" and is entitled to the distinction? ... Evidently because he had made himself unpopular and in some way the cause of the unpopularity was the splendid touring car. Other automobiles there are at Yale, but the Minnesota boy had the best machine in the bunch. Envy may have had something to do with the shabby treatment handed out to young Shevlin.

There were also suggestions that it was the reckless manner in which Shevlin drove his car that led to his being snubbed. Shevlin had also drawn attention in 1904 when traveling to England as part of the Harvard-Yale track team; his decision to stay at a different hotel than the team reportedly "cost him considerable of his rather meager popularity." According to another story, Shevlin had placed a $100 bet that he would be tapped by Skull and Bones, and when word of the bet reached the group, they declined to have him.

Shortly after the snub, Yale's famed trainer Mike Murphy announced that he was leaving Yale to take a position at Penn in Philadelphia. Some reports indicated that Murphy was "disgusted" over the snub of Shevlin and "the growth of aristocratic as opposed to democratic sentiments" at New Haven and did not care to remain there. Others suggested that the real reason for Murphy's move to Penn had more to do with the question of salary, as Penn agreed to pay Murphy a salary of $10,000 per year—more than double the salary then paid to a U.S. Senator.

Shevlin responded by rallying support to keep Murphy at Yale, even offering personally to pay any sum necessary to keep Murphy at Yale. In the end, Murphy went to Penn, and Shevlin stayed at Yale.

== Personal life ==
As the handsome son of a millionaire and one of the most famous athletes in the United States, Shevlin's courting of, and engagement to, Elizabeth Sherley was the subject of extensive press coverage. Sherley was reported to be one of the most beautiful young women in the South and the daughter of one of the wealthiest families of Louisville, Kentucky. Shevlin met the 17-year-old Sherley in 1905, and she attended all of Yale's 1905 football games. The press covered the courtship with articles bearing headlines such as, "Tom Shevlin Is Downed By Cupid." Sherley was described as "one of the prettiest girls who ever sat in a grandstand waving a blue banner and cheering a good play on the gridiron." After beating Harvard in 1905, newspapers reported that Shevlin said to a teammate, "I've realized my first ambition today, beating Harvard. I've got one more—to marry that pretty girl you see sitting there in that box."

The news of the engagement drew national press coverage, and the announcement that Sherley had broken off the engagement a few weeks later drew even wider coverage. After the engagement was announced, Sherley traveled to Baltimore, where she was the subject of considerable attention from the city's men. When news of this attention reached Shevlin, he wrote to her complaining of her activities. Sherley reacted by calling off the engagement noting, "it was not her fault that men wished to pay her attention."

In 1906, Shevlin's courtship of Vera Gilbert, the stepdaughter of New York City architect C. P. H. Gilbert, again put Shevlin's personal life in the public eye. After Shevlin announced his engagement to Gilbert, Gilbert's stepfather spoke publicly in opposition to the union and insisted that there was no engagement. Shevlin insisted that the couple was, in fact, engaged, and the back-and-forth between the two men received extensive press coverage in the last half of 1906. After Shevlin's second engagement in less than a year was called off, one newspaper asked, "Has the little love god deserted Tom Shevlin, Yale's ex-football captain, when not long ago the mere effect of his big, manly self plowing across a player-strewn football field set a hundred feminine hearts a-flutter?"

In February 1909, after renewing his courtship with Elizabeth Sherley, the two were married. The couple had two children, Betty and Thomas, Jr. In 1911, Shevlin and his first child, Betty Shevlin, were profiled in a lengthy article on millionaire babies. The article noted:

Some of the children of the busy rich inherit more than money. Some have a heritage of beauty. There is little Betty Shevlin of Minneapolis and Yale. ... Betty's father was Thomas Shevlin, famous football end, captain of the Yale team during his senior year, and present advisory coach for Old Eli's players. Tom was the idol of his college mates. He won numerous honors for his college, but he soon fell a victim to Cupid's tackle. There was no hope for Tom after he met that beautiful Kentucky thoroughbred, Miss Elizabeth Sherley. He looked into her violet eyes, saw her long black lashes, gave one glance at her radiant complexion, and, while losing his heart, did not fail to win hers.

== Business career ==
After graduating from Yale, Shevlin returned to Minneapolis where he operated a lumber business. Shevlin's father died in 1912 leaving an estate valued at $1.5 million to Shevlin and his two sisters. Shevlin and his sisters formed the Shevlin Company, a holding company for the family's lumber interests. Shevlin was successful in the lumber business and became president of 13 separate lumber companies and a director of two Minneapolis banks.

== Football coach ==
After moving back to Minneapolis, Shevlin also spent time coaching the football players at the University of Minnesota, where the team developed a new scheme known as "the Minnesota shift." After his death, a friend recounted a story of the passion for football displayed by Shevlin in coaching the Minnesota Golden Gophers at Northrop Field. Shevlin attended a practice in an expensive business suit, overcoat, derby and light colored gloves. Not satisfied with "verbal participation," Shevlin joined in the scrimmages, and at the end of an hour's work he "was thoroughly happy, but his natty clothes were hanging from him in shreds."

On several occasions, Shevlin also returned to Yale to help coach the school's football team during periods of difficulty. One writer opined that Shevlin made his reputation when he brought the Minnesota shift to Yale in 1910. When Yale was defeated 21-0 by Brown in 1910, the school sent for Shevlin. Backed by Yale's advisory coach Walter Camp, Shevlin was called from the West to teach the Yale football team the new style of play that had developed in that region. The New York Times reported as follows:

Thomas Shevlin, the famous Captain and end, who was called from the West to show the Yale men how the game was being played in his section undertook to give the team the benefit of his knowledge. Then came reports of dissensions among the coaches because of a conflict of old and new ideas.

Shevlin succeeded in turning the program around in 1910, as he coached the team to a 5-3 win over Princeton and a scoreless tie against Harvard.

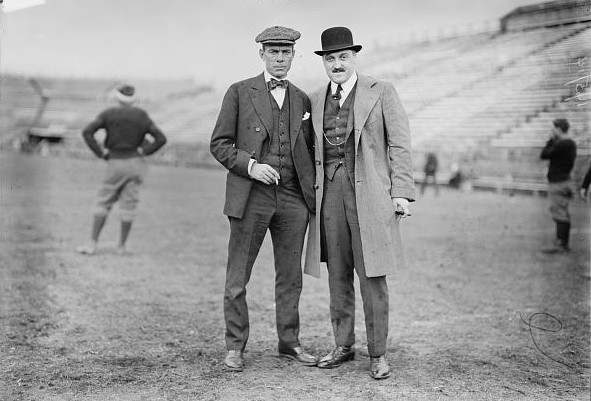
Frank Hinkey posing with Shevlin (right), wearing his familiar derby and Persian lamb lined overcoat

Shevlin continued assisting the Yale football team until the time of his death, and his colorful presence on the Yale sidelines was described as follows:

In that familiar heavy Persian lamb lined overcoat, wearing that familiar derby at that rakish angle, carrying that famous cane, with his horseshoe diamond pin in that flashy tie, and smoking that inevitable cigarette, he will run down the field with the varsity ends under kicks, and beat the youngsters in their togs every time. Then he'll get excited, and dressed though he is in top form, will rush right into a scrimmage and show 'em how it should be done, no matter how muddy the field. Practice over, Tom will go back to the Taft and order another suit. He seems to have a new suit of clothes every day.

In November 1915, Shevlin led Yale to a 13-7 win over Princeton in front of 50,000 fans at New Haven—the largest crowd ever to view a Yale-Princeton game. After the game, Shevlin was hailed as "the miracle man of football" who had "saved Yale from the worst gridiron defeat in her history." Shevlin had been called east in October 1915 and was credited with having "made order out of chaos" in just two weeks training the Yale team.

== Death and family ==
In the fall of 1915, Shevlin contracted a cold while training the Yale football team. He continued to coach through his illness, and reportedly lost 12 pounds during the training. At the close of the football season, Shevlin left for California, hoping to recuperate from the illness. The rest in California improved his condition, and he cut the stay short to return to Minneapolis to attend to his business interests. After returning to Minneapolis in late December 1915, Shevlin developed pneumonia. As his condition worsened, a telegram was sent to B.W. Sippy, a specialist in Chicago to come to his beside. Sippy was sent to Minneapolis on a special train which sped to Minneapolis in a then-record time of eight hours, but Shevlin died at his home on December 29, 1915, at age 32. After his death, it was written that "Shevlin gave his life to make Yale a winner." A Midwestern newspaper wrote:

The death of Tom Shevlin at Minneapolis, Minn., his home, closes one of the finest careers a college athlete ever led. From the time Shevlin entered Yale in 1902 he was a credit to clean amateur sports and from the time he left college in 1905 he was a credit to the business world.

Shevlin was survived by his widow and two children. Shevlin left a fortune estimated to be worth $3,500,000. The estate was left in trust for his children, and his widow was left with an allowance of $60,000 per year. He also left more than $1.5 million in life insurance, most of which went to the companies that he ran. Only seven other men in the United States carried as much life insurance as Shevlin. The resulting life insurance payment of $1,525,000 was the largest single-life payment made in 1916 by United States insurers.

After his death, the $1.5 million life insurance purchased by the Shevlin companies was used by life insurance in a major advertising campaign promoting the use of keyman insurance. The following text from a full-page advertisement in The Atlanta Constitution is an example:

The value of an officer or worker in any partnership or corporation is most realized at his death. Then insurance in favor of the business should be ready to replace him. Tom Shevlin's firm lost its most valuable asset in Tom Shevlin's death, but insurance of about a million dollars will replace his loss. There's a real moral in this for Atlanta partnerships and corporations—be prepared.
