= Alexander Garfield Gillespie =

American football player and brigadier general (1881–1956)

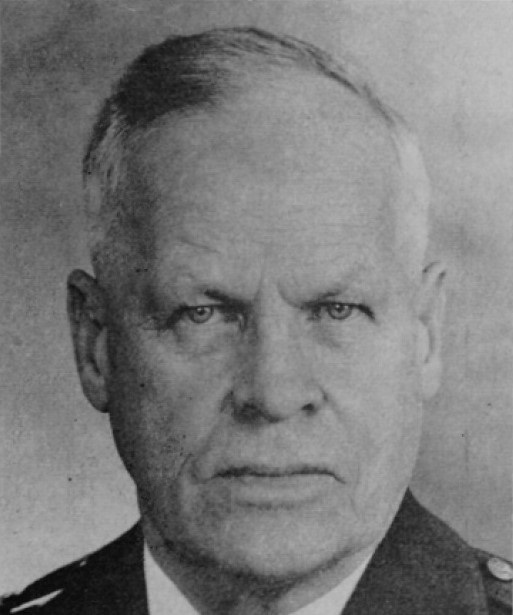

Profile
- Position: End

Personal information
- Born: August 19, 1881; Argentine Township, Michigan, U.S.
- Died: January 17, 1956 (aged 74); Washington, D.C., U.S.

Career information
- College: Army

Awards and highlights
- Second-team All-American (1904)

Alexander Garfield Gillespie (August 19, 1881 – January 17, 1956), sometimes known as A. G. Gillespie, was an American football player and a brigadier general in the United States Army.

== Biography ==
Gillespie was born and raised on a family farm in Argentine Township, Michigan, near Gaines, Michigan. He taught in the Dodder school district from 1901 to 1902 and attended Michigan Normal College in Ypsilanti, Michigan. He passed an examination for admission to the United States Military Academy and, in 1902, enrolled at the academy as a classmate of Douglas MacArthur, Joseph Stilwell and George S. Patton. He also played at the end position for the Army Black Knights football team and was captain of the 1905 Army football team. He was selected by Walter Camp as a second-team member of his 1904 College Football All-America Team.

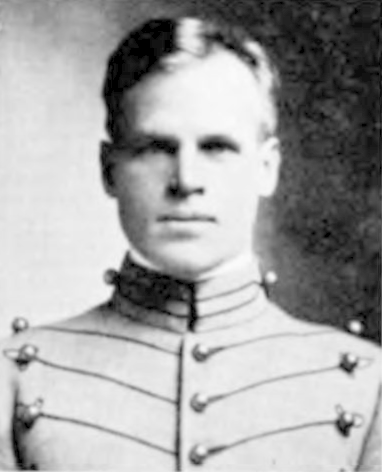
At West Point in 1906

After graduating from the Military Academy, Gillespie served in the United States Army until December 1946, attaining the rank of brigadier general. In 1911, he was recalled to the Military Academy and served as an assistant coach on the football team; in that capacity, he served as the position coach for a first-year end by the name of Dwight Eisenhower. He was stationed in the Philippines at the outbreak of World War I and returned to the United States for wartime service at Camp Grant before being sent to France. After the war, he served as a military attache in Tokyo and then spent four years as an ordnance and gunnery instructor at West Point. Gillespie graduated from the Command and General Staff School in 1924 and the United States Army War College in 1929. In the mid-1930s, while in command of the Rock Island Arsenal, he supervised the development of the light tank. In the late 1930s, while in command of the Watervliet Arsenal, he helped develop the Army's eight-inch cannon. For his service as chief of the industrial section of the Ordnance Department during World War II, Gillespie received a Distinguished Service Medal and a Legion of Merit award. He died in January 1956 at the Walter Reed Army Medical Center in Washington, D.C. Gillespie was buried at Arlington National Cemetery.
