= Daniel Hurley (American football) =

American football player and doctor

Harvard Crimson
- Position: Halfback

Personal information
- Born: November 16, 1881; Charlestown, Massachusetts, U.S.
- Died: October 15, 1945 (aged 63)

Career information
- High school: Boston Latin
- College: Harvard (1904–1905)

Awards and highlights
- 2× Consensus All-American (1904, 1905)

Daniel J. Hurley (November 16, 1881 – October 15, 1945) was an American football player and doctor. He played college football at the halfback position for the Harvard Crimson football team and was selected as a consensus All-American in 1904 and 1905. He was team captain for two years. Hurley was once badly injured, suffering a blood clot in the brain.

Hurley graduated from Harvard Medical School in 1909 and interned at Boston City Hospital and Lying-In Hospital. From 1913 to 1916 he practiced in Charlestown and was the assistant physician at the Charlestown State Prison. From 1916 to 1917 he studied tuberculosis at the Trudeau Sanatorium. From 1918 to 1919 he was a captain in the United States Army. In 1919 he began practicing in Boston. From 1923 to 1931 he was a surgical specialist with the United States Veterans' Bureau. From 1931 to 1938 he was a member of the state board of registration in medicine. Hurley spent his later years in Newton Centre, Massachusetts. He died on October 15, 1945.
