= James Cooney (American football) =

American athlete and businessman (1878–1964)

Profile
- Position: Tackle

Personal information
- Born: February 3, 1878; Scranton, Pennsylvania, U.S.
- Died: October 27, 1964 (aged 86); Scranton, Pennsylvania, U.S.

Career information
- College: Princeton (1903–1906)

Awards and highlights
- 2× National champion (1903, 1906); 2× Consensus All-American (1904, 1906)

James Lawrence Cooney (February 3, 1878 (Note: His year of birth was given as 1878 in his 1918 draft card, 1893 on his death certificate, and 1884 in his obituary. His estimated year of birth during the 1900 and 1920 census was 1880.) – October 27, 1964) was an All-American football player, baseball player and businessman. He played tackle for Princeton University football team and was selected as an All-American in 1904. He also was a star catcher for Princeton's baseball team from 1903–1906. Cooney was 5 feet, 10 inches in height and weighed 195 pounds.

The son of a coal miner who grew up in Scranton, Pennsylvania, Cooney enrolled at Exeter, where he played both football and baseball. Cooney was a coveted blue-chip player who was initially committed to enroll at Harvard. A Princeton alumnus, Charles Patterson, recruited Cooney to attend Princeton with offers of scholarships and opportunities to earn money. He became the manager of an eating club at Princeton and was granted exclusive rights to sell scorecards at Princeton baseball games. In his freshman year, he played left tackle for Princeton's championship team that defeated Yale 11–6. In November 1904, Cooney scored all of Princeton's points, consisting of two touchdowns and two goals, in a 12–6 win over West Point.

Cooney was selected as captain of the Princeton football team for 1905 and president of the senior class of 1907.

Cooney later went into a business career. He became superintendent of International Salt Co. in Ithaca, New York, and later headed the Scranton Coal Company. In his later years, he operated a newsstand until he was taken to the hospital three weeks before his death.

Cooney died of pneumonia in October 1964 at Scranton State General Hospital.
