= Joseph Thompson =

Joseph Thompson may refer to:

== Politicians ==
- Joseph B. Thompson (1871–1919), US congressman from Oklahoma
- Joseph Thompson (Canadian politician) (1867–1941), speaker of the Legislature of Ontario
- Joseph Oswalt Thompson (1869–1933), Alabama politician
- Joe Thompson (Australian politician) (1923–2005), member of the New South Wales Legislative Council

== Sport ==
- Joe Thompson (rugby) (1902–1983), British rugby union and rugby league footballer
- Joe Thompson (footballer) (1989–2025), English footballer
- Joseph Atang Thompson (born 1989), Nigerian football player
- Joe Thompson (speedway rider) (born 2004), English speedway rider

== Others ==
- Joseph Thompson (actor) (active since 2005), English actor
- Joseph Thompson (doctor) (1797–1885), early settler of Atlanta, Georgia, hotelier, and real-estate investor
- Joseph Thompson (pirate) (died 1719), pirate from Trinidad, Cuba
- Joseph Cheesman Thompson (1874–1943), medical officer in the United States Navy
- Joseph H. Thompson (1871–1928), World War I Medal of Honor recipient, lawyer, state senator and college football player and head coach
- Joseph Parrish Thompson (1819–1879), American abolitionist and Baptist minister
- Joseph Whitaker Thompson (1861–1946), American judge
- Joe Thompson (musician) (1918–2012), American musician
- Joe Thompson (c. 1784–?), African-American slave who sued in the case Joe Thompson vs Walter Clarke for his freedom
- Joe Thompson (bookmaker) (1838–1909), bookmaker in Melbourne, Victoria, and London, England
- Joe Thompson (pilot) (1919–2012), American World War II pilot
- Joe F. Thompson (born 1930s), American aerospace engineer
- Joseph H. Thompson (attorney), American lawyer

== See also ==
- Joseph Thomson (disambiguation)
