= Atang =

Atang may refer to:

== People ==
- Atang de la Rama (1902–1991), a singer and bodabil performer who became the first Filipina film actress
- Atang Tshikare (born 1980), South African artist and designer
- Joseph Atang Thompson (born 1989), Nigerian footballer
- Leo Atang (born 2007), English boxer

== Other ==
- Atang (food offering), Philippines
- Tropical Storm Atang (disambiguation)

== See also ==
- Eyo Atang, a village in Akwa Ibom, Nigeria
