= Tiger Joe =

Tiger Joe may refer to:

- nickname of Joe Thompson (pilot) (1919–2012), American World War II reconnaissance pilot
- Tiger Joe Robinson, ring name of English actor, stuntman and professional wrestler Joe Robinson (1927–2017)
- Tiger Joe Tomasso, ring name of Canadian professional wrestler Joseph DiTomasso (1922–1988)
- Tiger Joe (film), a 1982 Italian adventure movie
