= Tex Richards =

American football player (1889–1918)

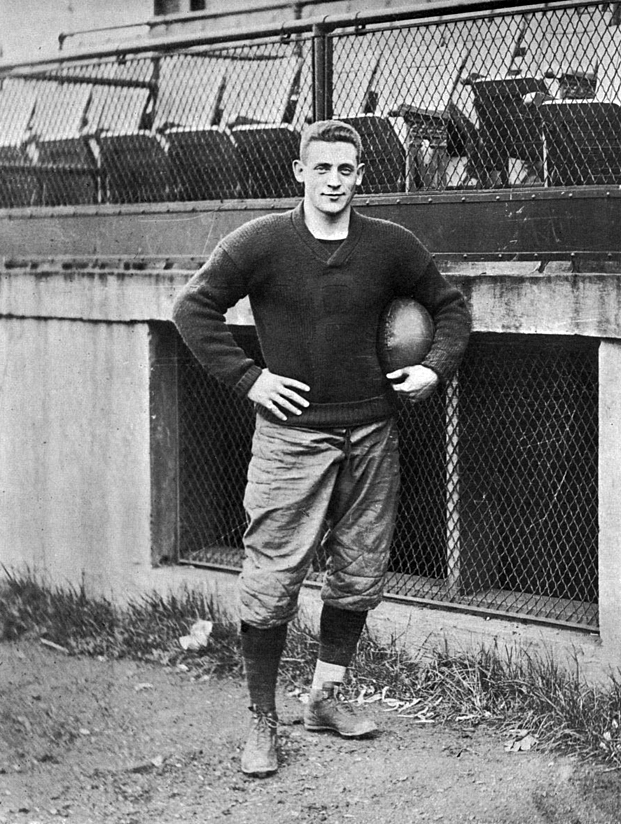
- Richards at Pittsburgh in 1910

Pittsburgh Panthers
- Position: Fullback

Personal information
- Born: August 9, 1889; Melbourne, Australia
- Died: November 7, 1918 (aged 29); Butler, Pennsylvania, U.S.

Awards and highlights
- National champion (1910)

Robert "Tex" William Richards Jr. (August 9, 1889 – November 7, 1918) was an American college football player on the University of Pittsburgh Panthers team from 1907 to 1910. He was the captain and fullback of the undefeated and unscored-upon 1910 Pittsburgh Panthers football team, coached by Joseph H. Thompson, and considered by many to be that season's national champion.

== Early life ==
Richards was born on August 9, 1889, the son of Robert William Richards Sr. and Hannah Sarah Richards. Robert Sr., an American of Welsh descent, was a traveling bookseller in the Pacific Rim in the 1880s, when he met a Melbourne school teacher, Hannah Sarah Harrex. They were married in 1888. Robert Jr. was born in Melbourne, Australia. He had three younger siblings: David John, Harry Charles and Ethlyn Ruth; Harry and Ethlyn died as children in Australia. Robert Sr., Hannah, Robert and David immigrated to U.S. in 1901 and settled in Wilkinsburg, Pennsylvania

Richards a 1905 graduate of Wilkinsburg High School. His mother, Hannah, was Head of Household for Andrew Mellon, future United States Secretary of the Treasury, and his family. For a time, Robert and David also worked for the Mellon family as bodyguards.

== College years ==
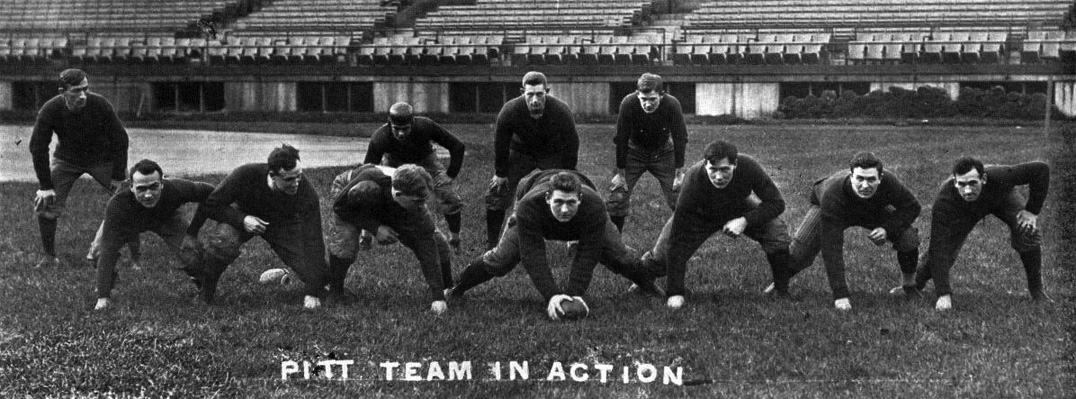
The 1910 Pitt team featuring Richards

Robert graduated from the University of Pittsburgh in 1910 with a degree in mechanical engineering. He was president of his class and a member of Alpha Alpha Fraternity. He was a four-year letterman in track and field and football. Robert's brother, David, also played on the 1909 and 1910 teams. Robert returned to Pitt to help with subsequent teams after 1910. He was an active alumnus, participating in dinners and events.

== Personal life ==
In 1915, Robert married Jennie Elton Wyatt. In 1916, they had their first and only child, Darlie Virginia. Robert worked at the Standard Steel Car Company in Butler, Pennsylvania, as a mechanical engineer. He served in the Pennsylvania Army National Guard for 3 months in Company L, 16th Regiment as a private, and 2 years in Company A, 18th Regiment and 3 years in Company K, 18th Regiment, where he became a sergeant. He died from the Spanish flu pandemic in Butler on November 7, 1918, aged 29. He was buried at Woodlawn Cemetery in Wilkinsburg, Pennsylvania.
