= 1910 Pittsburgh Panthers football team =

American college football season

1910 Pittsburgh Panthers football
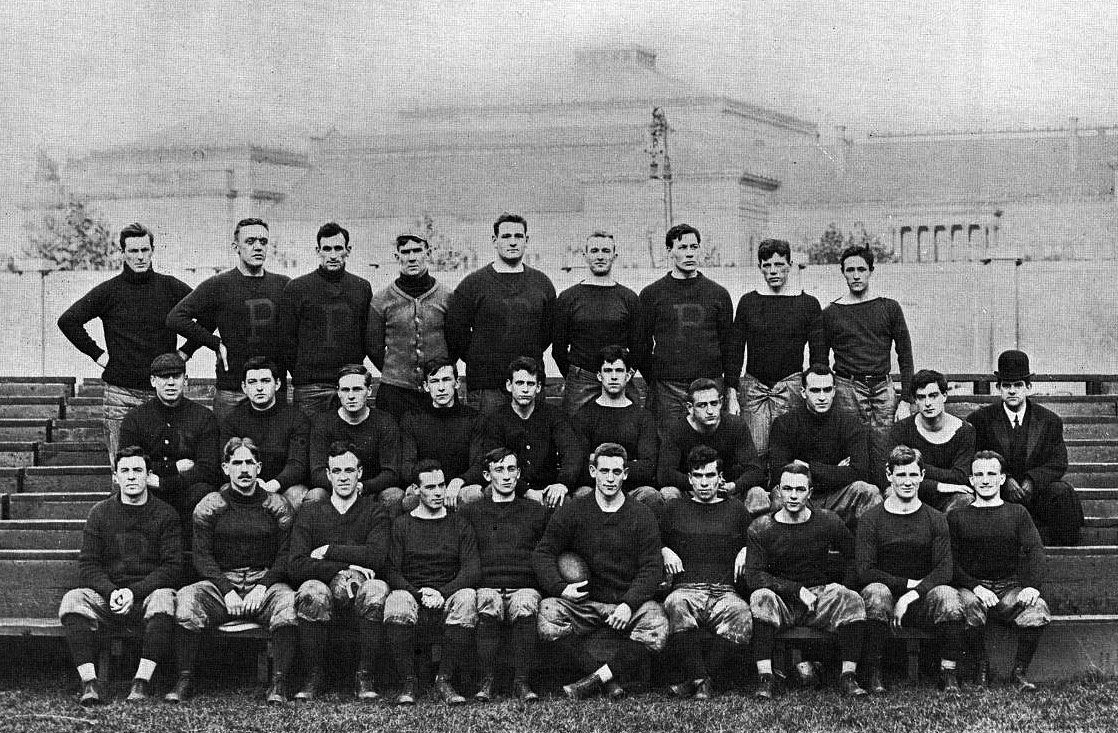

Co-national champion (NCF)
- Conference: Independent
- Record: 9–0
- Head coach: Joseph H. Thompson (2nd season)
- Captain: Tex Richards
- Home stadium: Forbes Field

1910 Eastern college football independents records
	Conf.			Overall
Team	W	L	T	W		L		T
Pittsburgh		–		9	–	0	–	0
Harvard		–		9	–	0	–	1
Penn		–		9	–	1	–	1
Princeton		–		7	–	1	–	0
Trinity (CT)		–		7	–	1	–	0
Ursinus		–		6	–	1	–	0
Rhode Island State		–		5	–	1	–	1
Lafayette		–		7	–	2	–	0
Army		–		6	–	2	–	0
Brown		–		7	–	2	–	1
Yale		–		6	–	2	–	2
Dartmouth		–		5	–	2	–	0
Cornell		–		5	–	2	–	1
Penn State		–		5	–	2	–	1
Colgate		–		4	–	2	–	1
Swarthmore		–		5	–	3	–	0
Franklin & Marshall		–		4	–	3	–	2
Syracuse		–		5	–	4	–	1
Rutgers		–		3	–	2	–	3
Carlisle		–		8	–	6	–	0
Holy Cross		–		3	–	3	–	2
Temple		–		3	–	3	–	0
Washington & Jefferson		–		3	–	3	–	1
Wesleyan		–		4	–	4	–	1
New Hampshire		–		2	–	3	–	1
NYU		–		2	–	4	–	1
Geneva		–		2	–	5	–	2
Dickinson		–		3	–	7	–	0
Lehigh		–		2	–	6	–	1
Bucknell		–		2	–	6	–	0
Vermont		–		1	–	5	–	1
Carnegie Tech		–		1	–	6	–	1
Tufts		–		1	–	7	–	1
Boston College		–		0	–	4	–	2
Villanova		–		0	–	4	–	2

The 1910 Pittsburgh Panthers football team was an American football team that represented the University of Pittsburgh as an independent during the 1910 college football season.

== Schedule ==
Date	Opponent	Site	Result	Attendance	Source
October 1	Ohio Northern	D.C. & A.C. Park; Wilkinsburg, PA	W 36–0		
October 8	Westminster	D.C. & A.C. Park; Wilkinsburg, PA	W 18–0		
October 15	Waynesburg	Forbes Field; Pittsburgh, PA	W 42–0		
October 22	Georgetown	Forbes Field; Pittsburgh, PA	W 17–0	3,000	
October 29	Ohio	Forbes Field; Pittsburgh, PA	W 71–0		
November 5	West Virginia	Forbes Field; Pittsburgh, PA (rivalry)	W 38–0		
November 12	Washington & Jefferson	Forbes Field; Pittsburgh, PA	W 14–0	12,000	
November 19	Carnegie Tech	Forbes Field; Pittsburgh, PA	W 35–0		
November 24	Penn State	Forbes Field; Pittsburgh, PA (rivalry)	W 11–0	18,000	

== Season recap ==
After Coach Joe Thompson led the Pitt eleven to a surprising 6–2–1 record in 1909 with only four returning players, the Pitt Athletic Association, students, faculty and fans were looking forward to another successful season in 1910. Captain Homer Roe and Frank Van Doren were the only losses to graduation. All the returning players already knew the Coach Thompson system. The schedule that Graduate Manager Hurst assembled was weaker than previous years as Carlisle, Notre Dame and Bucknell were missing. Georgetown, Carnegie Tech and Ohio University were the replacements and Pitt had no away games. Significant games played by Pitt during the 1910 season included victories over West Virginia (38–0), Washington & Jefferson (14–0), and Penn State (11–0). The first two games were played at D.C. & A.C. Park and the final seven at Forbes Field. The football game programs for this season were "The First Annual Football Yearbook" put out by the University of Pittsburgh Athletic Committee. For ten cents one received seventy-two pages of Pitt sports history. The covers were photos of prominent University officials: Chancellor Samuel Black McCormick (Washington & Jefferson game), Dr. Albert Frost, Dean of the Faculty of the College and Engineering School (West Virginia game ), and Coach Thompson (Penn State game). The University would continue the Yearbook style program through the 1926 season. The Pitt Weekly school newspaper debuted on September 26, 1910 and covered the football season in depth. The results of the season were much better than anyone had anticipated. Pittsburgh shut out all nine of its opponents, outscored opponents by a combined score of 282 to 0, and finished with a perfect 9–0 record in their second year under head coach Joseph H. Thompson.

The Pitt Weekly, Wed., Nov. 30, 1910 wrote:

"By defeating Penn State on Thanksgiving Day, 1910, the Pitt Varsity under "Joe" Thompson and "Tex" Richards, piled up a record that stamps it as the greatest team that ever defended the Gold and Blue. During the whole season not an opponent was able to cross their goal line. And what a great finish it was to beat Penn State by eleven points!"

After the highly successful 1910 football season both record wise and financially, the 1912 edition of the Owl Yearbook summarized the situation best:

"The remarkable success attained by the representatives of the University of Pittsburgh on the athletic field during the year of 1910 marks the high–tide of athletic activity at this institution. Until a few years ago athletics in Pittsburgh were unorganized and the teams were unworthy to represent an institution of higher learning....In 1904 a number of enthusiastic Alumni took up the General Athletic Committee and arranged for a foot-ball coach and training table, and a schedule that put Pitt on the athletic map. Since that time the organization has been perfect, the student enthusiasm has been enlisted, and steady progress the result. The latest improvement has been the installation of the graduate coaching system. Joseph H. Thompson has proved to be the right man in the right place, as championships in foot-ball and track go to prove. Joe has developed a "Pitt system," one that will place the University of Pittsburgh among the great names in intercollegiate sports."

The 1910 Pitt team has been recognized as a co-national champion by the National Championship Foundation. However, Pitt did not play games against any of the leading football teams and Harvard was recognized as champion by more selectors.

== Coaching staff ==
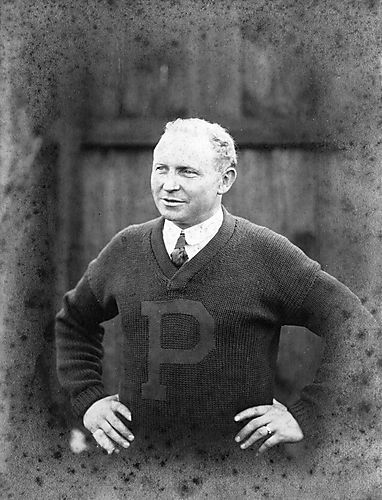
Coach Joseph Thompson

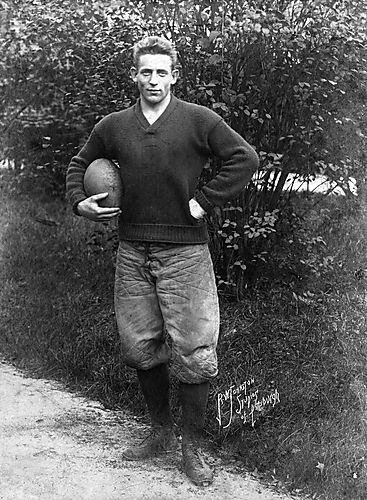
Team Captain "Tex" Richards

1910 Pittsburgh Panthers football staff
Coaching staff: Joseph H. Thompson – Head coach; Floyd Rose – Assistant backfield coach; Alexander Stevenson – Assistant line coach; Frank Van Doren – Assistant coach	Support staff: Laurence Hurst – Graduate manager of athletics; Robert "Tex" Richards – Captain

== Roster ==
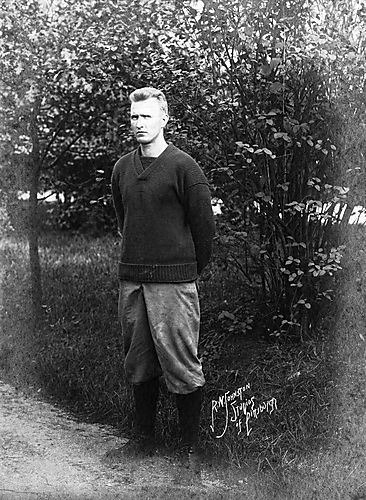
Charles Quailey

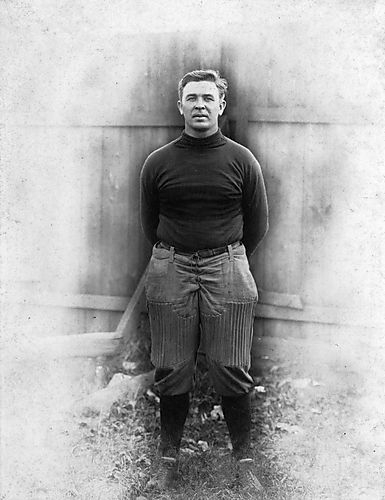
George Bailey

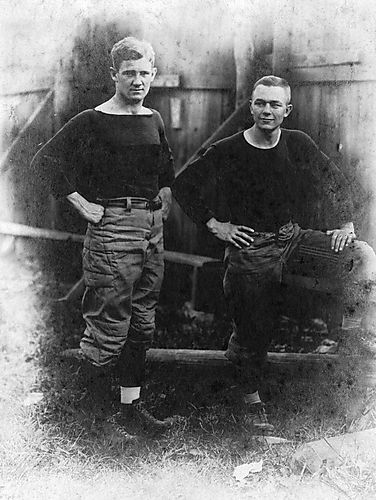
Brown & Hittner

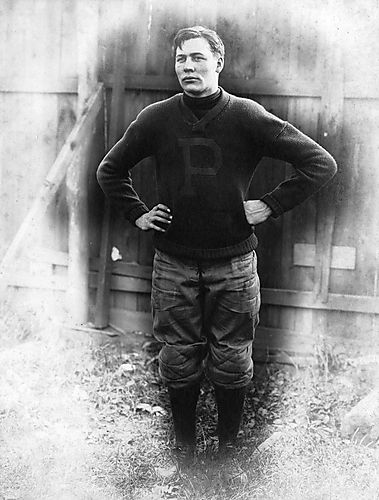
Henry Blair

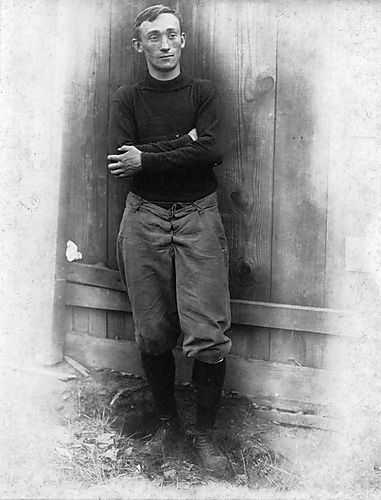
Tillie Dewar

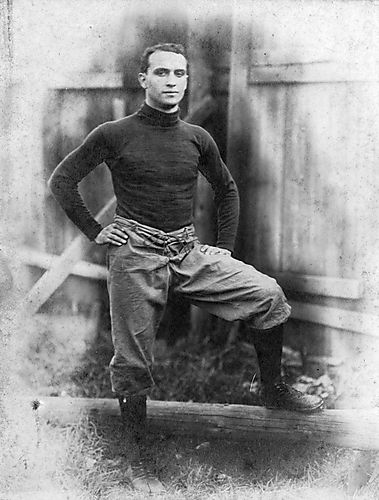
John Lindsay

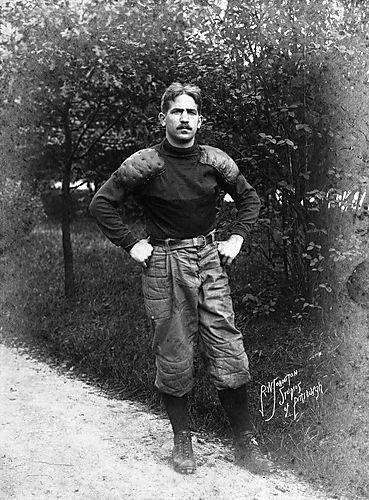
Karl Dallenbach

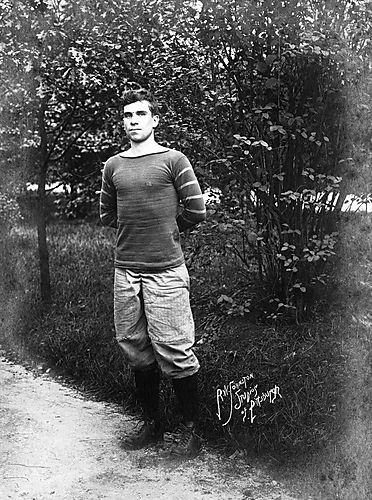
Norman Budd

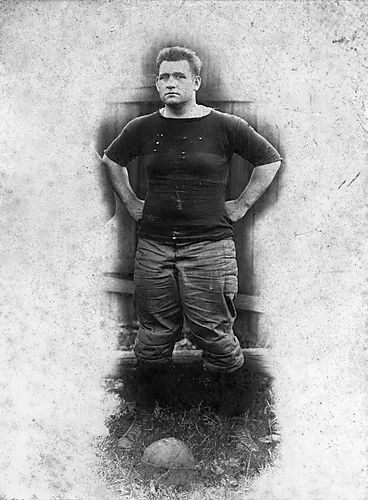
Ralph Galvin

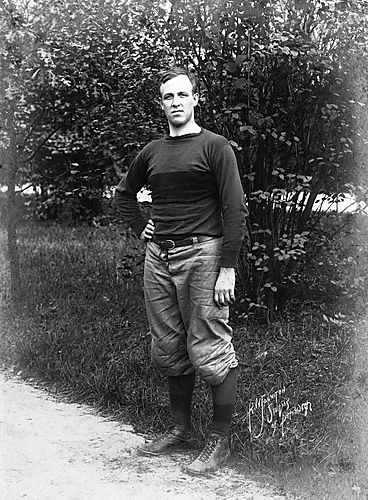
James Stevenson

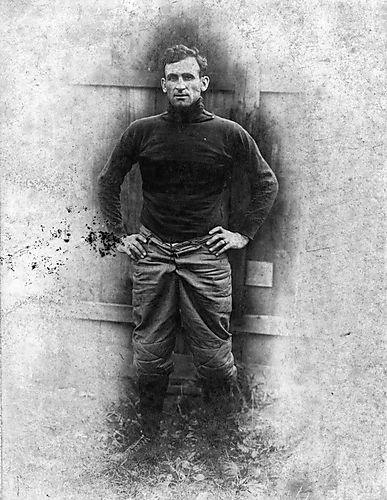
Robert Peacock

1910 Pittsburgh Panthers football roster
Player	Position	Games	Height	Weight	Class	Prep School	Degree	Residence
Robert W. "Tex" Richards^	fullback	9	5' 10"	180	1910	Wilkinsburg H.S.	Mechanical Engineering	Butler, PA
John Lindsay^	end	9	5' 10"	160	1912	Johnstown H.S.	Doctor of Dental Surgery	Johnstown, PA
Hube Wagner^	end	8	5' 11"	185	1914	Monaca H.S.	Doctor of Medicine	Monaca, PA
Ralph Galvin^	center	9	6' 0"	235	1913	New Brighton H.S.	Doctor of Dental Surgery	New Brighton, PA
George Brown^	halfback	9	5' 10"	170	1913	New Brighton H.S.	Associate Economics	Haydenville, OH
Robert J. Peacock^	end	9	5' 11"	170	1911	Dennison College	Doctor of Dental Surgery	Houston, PA
Henry Blair^	guard	9	6'	190	1913	Allegheny H.S.	Dental School	
Norman Budd^	quarterback	9	5' 8"	150	1911	Sharon H.S.	Associate Dental	Farrell, PA
George Henry Bailey^	tackle	8	5' 10"	178	1911	Stroudsburg Normal	Doctor of Dental Surgery	Scranton, PA
William Hittner^	halfback	8	5' 7"	145	1913	Carnegie Tech	Associate Economics	Pittsburgh, PA
Herbert Dewar^	quarterback	8	5' 7"	147	1912	California Normal	Doctor of Dental Surgery	Elizabeth, PA
Ray Butler^	end	7	5' 7"	142	1910	Pittsburgh H.S.	Doctor of Dental Surgery	Sharon, PA
James Stevenson^	tackle	8	5' 11"	195	1912	Chester H.S. (WVA)	Doctor of Medicine	McKeesport, PA
Charles Quailey^	halfback	9	5' 10"	163	1912	Dennison H.S.	Doctor of Dental Surgery	Pittsburgh, PA
David J. Richards^	fullback	6			1913	Wilkinsburg H.S.	Associate Engineering	Verona, PA
George Gehlert^	guard	8	5' 11"	205	1913	Villa Nova Prep	Doctor of Dental Surgery	Hannah, ND
Karl M. Dallenbach^	guard	8	5' 10"	210	1911		Master of Arts	Ithaca, NY
Ralph Linn	guard	2	6'	215	1913	Salem H.S.	Doctor of Dental Surgery	Youngstown, OH
Walter Hinchman	guard	6	5' 10"	135	1912	Edgewood H.S.	Doctor of Dental Surgery	McKeesport, PA
Charles Reed	end	5	5' 7"	150	1912	Homestead H.S.	Bachelor of Science	Pittsburgh, PA
Ross Feightner	tackle	2	5' 11"	188	1912	Greensburg H.S.	Doctor of Dental Surgery	Greensburg, PA
John Cummins	guard	2	5' 8"	160	1914	California Normal	Bachelor of Science	Ben Avon, PA
Bowman Ashe	end	2	6' 9"	170	1912	Mt. Union College	Bachelor of Science in Economics 1912 and Associate Law in 1917	Knoxville, PA
Haslett	end	2						
J. Rosenbloom	halfback	2						
^ Lettermen

== Game summaries ==
=== Ohio Northern ===
Week 1: Ohio Northern at Pitt

Team	1	2	3	4	Total
Ohio Northern	0	0	0	0	0
• Pitt	0	0	30	6	36

- Date: October 1, 1910
- Location: D.C. & A.C. Field
  Pittsburgh, PA
- Referee: Harry C. Fry Jr. (Fort Pitt A.C.)

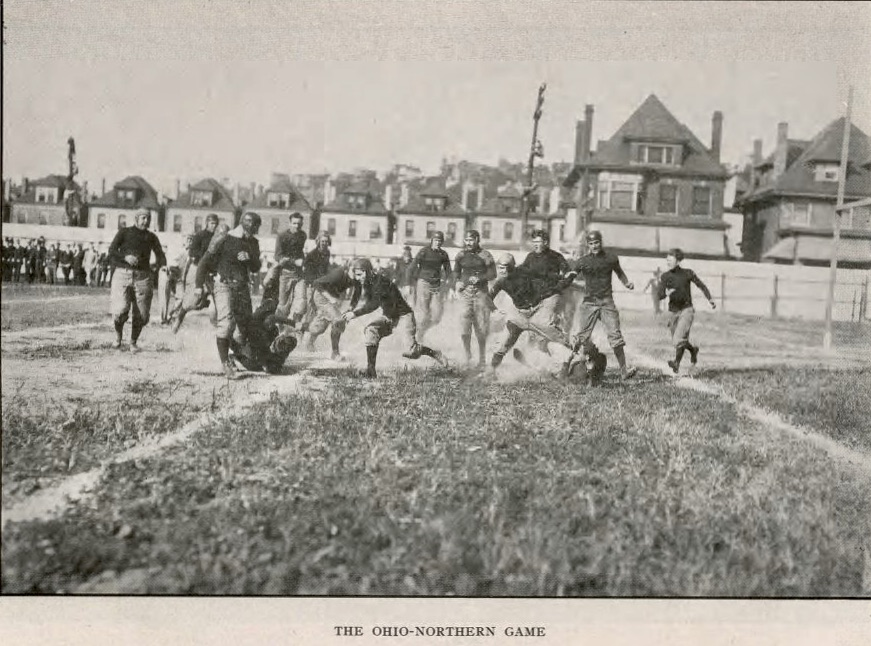
1910 Pitt versus Ohio Northern opening game

The 1910 edition of the University of Pittsburgh football team made its debut on October 2 at D.C. & A.C. Park in Wilkinsburg. The opponents were the Ohio Northern Polar Bears from Ada, Ohio. They were coached by former Pitt player Snuff McKeown. The Ohio offense spent the first quarter in Pitt territory, but the Pitt defense kept them from scoring. Coach Thompson made two substitutions at the break. Tillie Dewar replaced Norman Budd at quarterback and Karl Dallenbach replaced Walter Hinchman at guard.

In the second quarter the Pitt offense began to penetrate the Ohio defense and was on the Bears' five-yard line as time expired in the first half. The third quarter belonged to the Pitt offense as they scored five unanswered touchdowns. On Pitt's first possession Dewar returned a punt forty yards to the Ohioans ten-yard line. Captain Tex Richards scored on the next play. Minutes later Dewar raced sixty yards for the second touchdown. Tex Richards continued the onslaught with a twenty-five yard scamper for a touchdown, followed by a ninety yard kickoff return score. Tex was replaced in the lineup by his brother Dave. On the next possession Pitt halfback William Hittner broke the line of scrimmage and had clear sailing but tripped after gaining thirty-five yards. Halfback Rosenbloom finally plunged into the end zone from the one. Center Ralph Galvin was successful on all five points after and Pitt led 30 to 0 entering the final quarter.

Coach Thompson was pleased and made wholesale substitutions. Hittner atoned for tripping and closed out the scoring with an eighty yard gallop around left end. Galvin was good on the point after. The game ended with the score 36–0. Ohio Northern would finish the season with a 2–5 record.

The Pitt starting lineup for the game against Ohio Northern was Jack Lindsay (left end), James Stevenson (left tackle), Walter Hinchman (left guard), Ralph Galvin (center), Henry Blair (right guard), George Bailey (right tackle), Robert Peacock (right end), Norman Budd (quarterback), J. Rosenbloom (left halfback), George Brown (right halfback), and Tex Richards (fullback). Substitutions made during the game were: Karl Dallenbach replaced Walter Hinchman at left guard; Tillie Dewar replaced Norman Budd at quarterback; George Gehlert replaced Henry Blair at right guard; Henry Blair replaced James Stevenson at left tackle; William Hittner replaced George Brown at right halfback; Hube Wagner replaced Jack Lindsay at left end; Dave Richards replaced Tex Richards at fullback; Harry Haslett replaced Hube Wagner at left end; Charles Quailey replaced William Hittner at right halfback; Ray Butler replaced Robert Peacock at right end; George Brown replaced Rosenbloom at left halfback; James Stevenson replaced George Brown at left halfback; and Norman Budd replaced Tillie Dewar at quarterback. The game consisted of ten-minute quarters.

=== Westminster ===
Week 2: Westminster at Pitt

Team	1	2	3	4	Total
Westminster	0	0	0	0	0
• Pitt	0	6	6	6	18

- Date: October 8, 1910
- Location: D.C. & A.C. Field
  Pittsburgh, PA
- Referee: E. W. Cober (Bucknell)

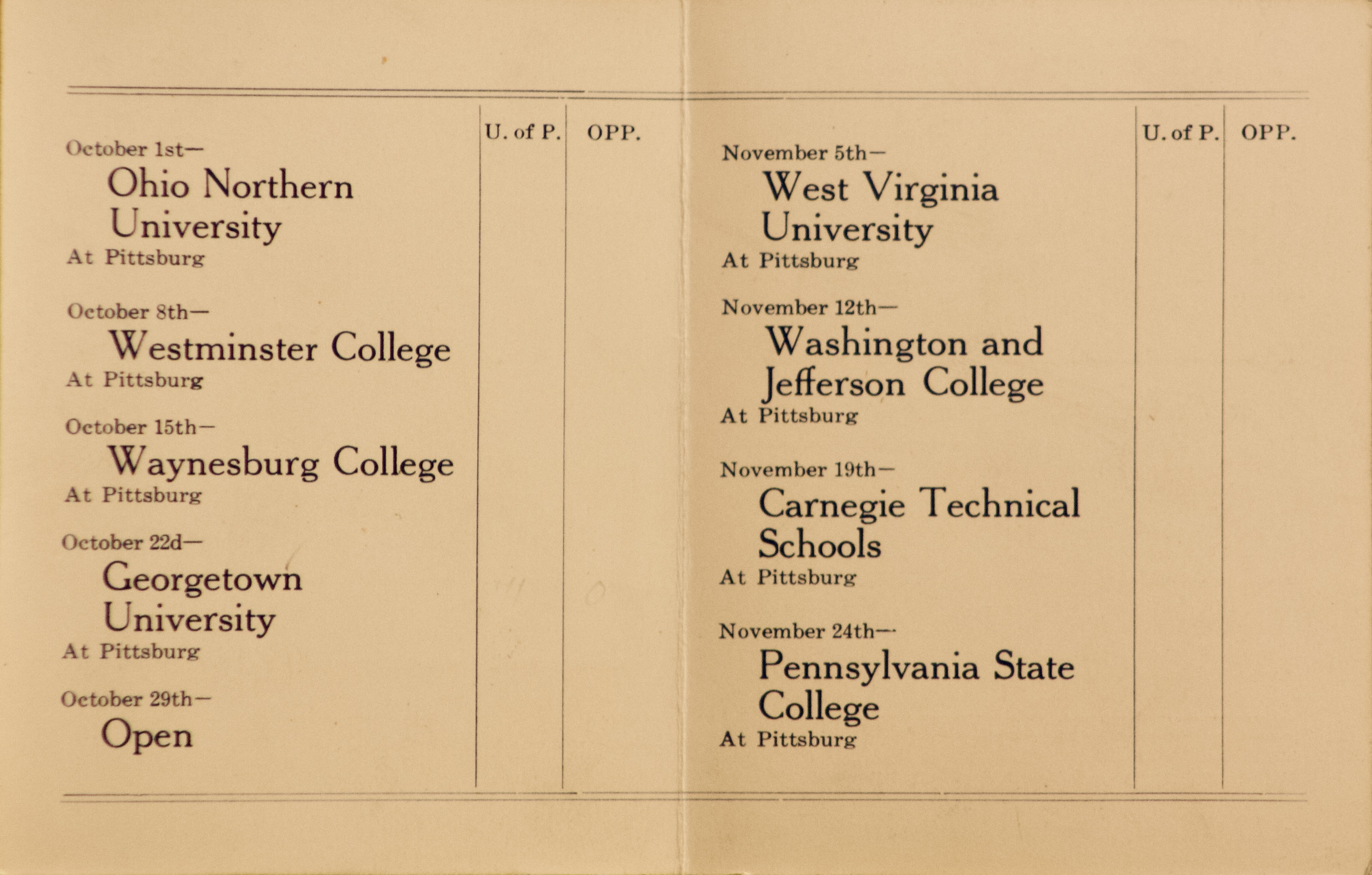
1910 pocket schedule

On October 8 the outweighed Westminster Titans from New Wilmington, Pa. gave the Pitt team a battle for all four quarters.

For the second straight week, the Pitt offense did not score in the first quarter. They kept the ball in Titan territory but could not finish a drive. Center Ralph Galvin missed both a thirty-three yard and a twenty yard field goal attempt.

Two minutes into the second quarter guard Henry Blair recovered a Westminster fumble by quarterback McClure on the Titan twenty-yard line. Fullback Tex Richards pounded the ball into the end zone for the first score. Galvin converted the point after and Pitt led 6 to 0. McClure (140 lbs.) decided to punch Galvin (240 lbs.) out of frustration and the referee readily disqualified McClure and stepped off the penalty. Captain Richards convinced the officials to allow McCLure to stay in the game. The Pitt offense advanced the ball to the Titan five-yard line prior to halftime but were unable to score.

Halfback Charles Quailey was replaced by William Hittner and Tillie Dewar stepped in at quarterback for Norman Budd to start the third quarter. Pitt's halfback Rosenbloom fumbled away their first possession of the half on the Titan fourteen-yard line but Westminster promptly punted out of trouble. The Pitt offense did not waste this possession as Captain Richards carried it into the end zone from the six for his second touchdown of the afternoon. Galvin converted the point after and Pitt led 12 to 0. The final score was made by two hundred and forty-five pound center Ralph Galvin on a five yard plunge. The Pittsburg Press described it as "when he hit the line it was like a battering ram going up against an attacking army." Galvin was successful on the point after and Pitt won the game 18 to 0. Westminster would finish the season with a 6–2 record.

The Pitt starting lineup for the game against Westminster was Jack Lindsay (right end), James Stevenson (right tackle), Walter Hinchman (right guard), Ralph Galvin (center), Henry Blair (left guard), George Bailey (left tackle), Robert Peacock (left end), Norman Budd (quarterback), J. Rosenbloom (right halfback), Charles Quailey (left halfback), and Tex Richards (fullback). Substitutions made during the game were: William Hittner replaced Charles Quailey at left halfback; Tillie Dewar replaced Norman Budd at quarterback; Hube Wagner replaced Jack Lindsay at right end; Walter Hinchman replaced Karl Dallenbach at right guard; George Gehlert replaced Henry Blair at left guard; Henry Blair replaced James Stevenson at right tackle; George Brown replaced Rosenbloom at right halfback; and Dave Richards replaced Tex Richards at fullback. The game consisted of ten-minute quarters.

=== Waynesburg ===
Week 3: Waynesburg at Pitt

Team	1	2	3	4	Total
Waynesburg	0	0	0	0	0
• Pitt	14	5	12	6	37

- Date: October 15, 1910
- Location: Forbes Field
  Pittsburgh, PA
- Referee: Harry C. Fry Jr. (Fort Pitt A.C.)

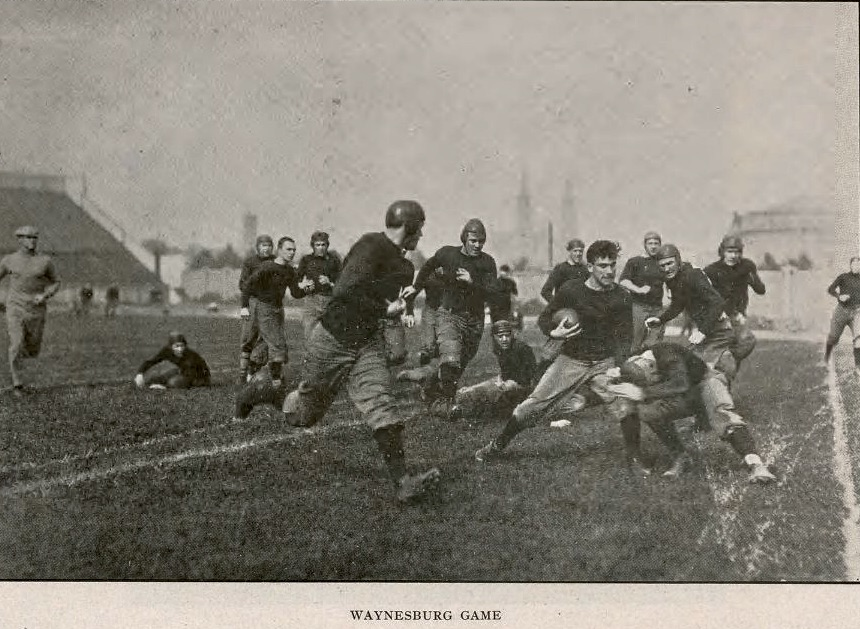
1910 Pitt versus Waynesburg football game action

On October 15, the Pitt football team opened the Forbes Field part of their schedule with resounding success against the Waynesburg Yellow Jackets. The Pitt defense held Waynesburg to seven total offensive yards. The Pitt offense pretty much scored at will. They completed nine of ten forward passes.

Freshman Hube Wagner started the game at fullback and scored the first touchdown. Center Ralph Galvin scored minutes later and he also converted both extra points. On Waynesburg's first play from scrimmage fullback Lippincott was tackled in the end zone for a safety. The first quarter ended with Pitt ahead 14 to 0.

Galvin missed a field goal early in the second quarter but the Pitt offense later advanced the ball to the Waynesburg fifteen and Galvin bulldozed across the goal. Pitt led 19–0 at halftime.

Hube Wagner scored on the first possession of the second half and Galvin made the point after. Minutes later, Pitt scored on a seventy-five yard pass play from halfback Quailey to end Jack Lindsey. Galvin came through on the extra point and Pitt led 31 to 0 at the end of three quarters.

Captain Tex Richards played the fourth quarter and made his presence felt with an eight yard scoring run and a twenty-five yard touchdown pass to halfback George Brown. Galvin converted one of the extra points and Pitt won 42 to 0. Waynesburg would finish the season with a respectable 4–3 record.

The Pitt starting lineup for the game against Waynesburg was Jack Lindsay (right end), James Stevenson (right tackle), Walter Hinchman (right guard), Ralph Galvin (center), George Gehlert (left guard), George Bailey (left tackle), Robert Peacock (left end), Norman Budd (quarterback), William Hittner (right halfback), Charles Quailey (left halfback), and Hube Wagner (fullback). Substitutions made during the game were: Ross Feightner replaced Hube Wagner at fullback; Karl Dallenbach replaced Walter Hinchman at right guard; George Brown replaced Charles Quailey at left halfback; Dave Richards replaced William Hittner at right halfback; Henry Blair replaced George Bailey at left tackle; Harry Haslett replaced Robert Peacock at left end; Tex Richards replaced Ross Feightner at fullback; Ray Butler replaced Jack Lindsay at right end; Bowman Ashe replaced Harry Haslett at left end; and Hube Wagner replaced Dave Richards at right halfback. The game consisted of ten-minute quarters.

=== Georgetown ===
Week 4: Georgetown at Pitt

Team	1	2	3	4	Total
Georgetown	0	0	0	0	0
• Pitt	0	9	8	0	17

- Date: October 22, 1910
- Location: Forbes Field
  Pittsburgh, PA
- Referee: F. A. Godcharles (Lafayette)

On October 22 the first "hard" game on the schedule was at Forbes Field against the Blue and Gray of Georgetown University. Three thousand noisy rooters watched the action. Both teams brought bands. "Hail to Pitt" was introduced to the football crowd at this game. The words were written by head cheerleader George Kirk, class of 1913, and the music was written by Lester Taylor, class of 1912. Both teams were undefeated.

On Pitt's first possession fullback Tex Richards' pass was intercepted by Georgetown halfback Fury. He raced toward the end zone but was tackled by Richards and fumbled the ball back to Pitt. The Pitt offense was able to advance the ball but both center Ralph Galvin and end Jack Lindsey missed field goals. The first quarter was scoreless.

Pitt's first possession of the second quarter started on the Georgetown 50-yard line. Quarterback Tillie Dewar gained sixteen yards on first down. Captain Tex Richards scampered around the left end to the three. On first down Tex Richards followed guard Henry Blair across the goal line. Ralph Galvin kicked the point after and Pitt led 6 to 0. On Pitt's next offensive series they started again at midfield but the Georgetown defense stiffened. On third down Pitt faked a punt and Richards completed a pass to Jack Lindsey on the twenty. The Georgetown defense held and forced a Galvin field goal attempt from the 26-yard line. This time he was successful and Pitt led 9 to 0 at halftime.

Pitt scored on their first possession of the third quarter on a seven yard dash by Dewar. Galvin missed the point after. Pittsburgh 14 to Georgetown 0. Later in the quarter Galvin was successful on a twenty-five yard field goal to close out the scoring.

Georgetown fullback Walsh was disqualified for slugging in the fourth quarter and the Georgetown defense kept Pitt from adding to the score. The final read 17–0. Georgetown would finish the season with a 7–1–1 record.

The Pitt starting lineup for the game against Georgetown was Jack Lindsay (right end), James Stevenson (right tackle), Karl Dallenbach (right guard), Ralph Galvin (center), Henry Blair (left guard), George Bailey (left tackle), Robert Peacock (left end), Tillie Dewar (quarterback), William Hittner (left halfback), George Brown (right halfback), and Tex Richards (fullback). Substitutions made during the game were: Ray Butler replaced Robert Peacock at left end; Hube Wagner replaced Jack Lindsay at right end; Charles Quailey replaced George Brown at right halfback; and Norman Budd replaced Tillie Dewar at quarterback. The game consisted of fifteen-minute quarters.

=== Ohio U. ===
Week 5: Ohio U. at Pitt

Team	1	2	3	4	Total
Ohio U.	0	0	0	0	0
• Pitt	24	9	17	21	71

- Date: October 29, 1910
- Location: Forbes Field
  Pittsburgh, PA
- Referee: Ewing Rafferty (Princeton)

On October 29, the visiting Bobcats of Ohio University in Athens, Ohio were greeted with a snow covered Forbes Field. When the game started they were buried under a full-scale avalanche by the Pitt offense. Pitt scored eleven touchdowns, ten extra points and two field goals for a total of seventy-one points. The Bobcats did not make a first down. Pitt quarterback Norman Budd led the scoring with six touchdowns. One was a crowd pleasing ninety yard scamper. Fullback Tex Richards scored three touchdowns. Halfback George Brown chipped in with two touchdowns of his own. Center Ralph Galvin kicked the extra points and a thirty-six yard field goal. End Jack Lindsay drop kicked a forty-one yard field goal. The Pittsburgh Daily Post noted "It was one of the most sensational drop kicks ever seen in the Smoky City and the spectators, seeing a chance to warm their chilled anatomies, howled with glee." Ohio U. would finish the season with an 0-6-1 record.

The Pitt starting lineup for the game against Ohio U. was Jack Lindsay (right end), Karl Dallenbach (right tackle), Walter Hinchman (right guard), Ralph Galvin (center), George Gehlert (left guard), Henry Blair (left tackle), Robert Peacock (left end), Norman Budd (quarterback), William Hittner (right halfback), George Brown (left halfback), and Tex Richards (fullback). Substitutions made during the game were: Ralph Linn replaced George Gehlert at left guard; John Cummins replaced Walter Hinchman at right guard; Ray Butler replaced Jack Linsay at right end; Tillie Dewar replaced Norman Budd at quarterback; Bowman Ashe replaced George Brown at left halfback; Charles Quailey replaced William Hittner at right halfback; and Dave Richards replaced Tex Richards at fullback. The game consisted of fifteen-minute quarters.

=== West Virginia ===
Week 6: West Virginia at Pitt

Team	1	2	3	4	Total
West Virginia	0	0	0	0	0
• Pitt	0	11	15	12	38

- Date: November 5, 1910
- Location: Forbes Field
  Pittsburgh, PA
- Referee: C. J. McCarthy Jr. (Germantown Academy)

On November 5, the steam-rolling Pitt football eleven achieved their sixth straight shutout victory by pummeling the West Virginia Mountaineers 38 to 0.

Early in the game Pitt guard Henry Blair blocked a West Virginia punt and Pitt guard Dallenbach recovered on the Mountaineers' 45-yard line. On first down Pitt fullback Tex Richards quick kicked and Mountaineer quarterback Munk fumbled the kick. Pitt halfback Hittner picked up the loose pigskin and raced twenty yards for the first touchdown. Center Ralph Galvin made the extra point and Pitt led 6 to 0. In the second quarter Pitt end Robert Peacock picked up another misplayed punt and scampered fifty yards for the score. Galvin missed the point after. Pitt's next possession resulted in a missed Galvin field goal. The Mountaineers replaced Munk with Thompson. He promptly broke through the Pitt defense and barreled seventy yards before being tackled by Tex Richards on the ten-yard line.

The Pittsburgh Daily Post wrote "The Pitt captain's offensive work stood out all day, as it has in practically every game of the season, and when he made good in the "ultimate moment," for any football artist, by such a beautiful tackle, in the face of strong interference, his admirers gave full vent of their feelings." The staunch Pitt defense stiffened and Mountaineer fullback Baughman's field goal attempt was no good. The halftime score was 11-0.

At the start of the second half, Mountaineer halfback Kinsey had his chewing gum lodge in his throat when being tackled and he had to be rushed to the hospital. He did recover. Early in the third quarter Galvin was successful on a field goal to extend the lead to 14–0. On their next possession Pitt quarterback Tillie Dewar scored on a fifteen yard dash. Galvin connected on the point after. Richards closed the third quarter scoring with a forty-five yard gallop and opened the fourth quarter scoring with an eight yard scoot around left end. Galvin kicked the extra points.

Dewar excited the crowd with a seventy-five yard touchdown scamper that was called back due to a holding penalty. Four plays later he carried the pigskin into the end zone from the fourteen and Galvin nailed the extra point to close the scoring. Final score: Pitt 38 to West Virginia 0. After losing five of the first six games versus the Mountaineers, Pitt now led the "Backyard Brawl" series 6–5–1. West Virginia finished the season with a 2-4-1 record.

The Pitt starting lineup for the game against West Virginia was Jack Lindsay (right end), James Stevenson (right tackle), Karl Dallenbach (right guard), Ralph Galvin (center), Henry Blair (left guard), George Bailey (left tackle), Robert Peacock (left end), Norman Budd (quarterback), William Hittner (left halfback), George Brown (right halfback), and Tex Richards (fullback). Substitutions made during the game were: Tillie Dewar replaced Norman Budd at quarterback; Hube Wagner replaced Jack Lindsay at right end; John Cummins replace Henry Blair at left guard; Charles Quailey replaced William Hittner at left halfback; Ray Butler replaced Robert Peacock at left end; Walter Hinchman replaced Karl Dallenbach at right guard; Dave Richards replaced Tex Richards at fullback; and George Gehlert replaced James Stevenson at right tackle. The game consisted of fifteen-minute quarters.

=== Washington & Jefferson ===
Week 7: W. & J. at Pitt

Team	1	2	3	4	Total
W. & J.	0	0	0	0	0
• Pitt	0	5	3	6	14

- Date: November 12, 1910
- Location: Forbes Field
  Pittsburgh, PA
- Referee: Fred Crolius (Dartmouth)

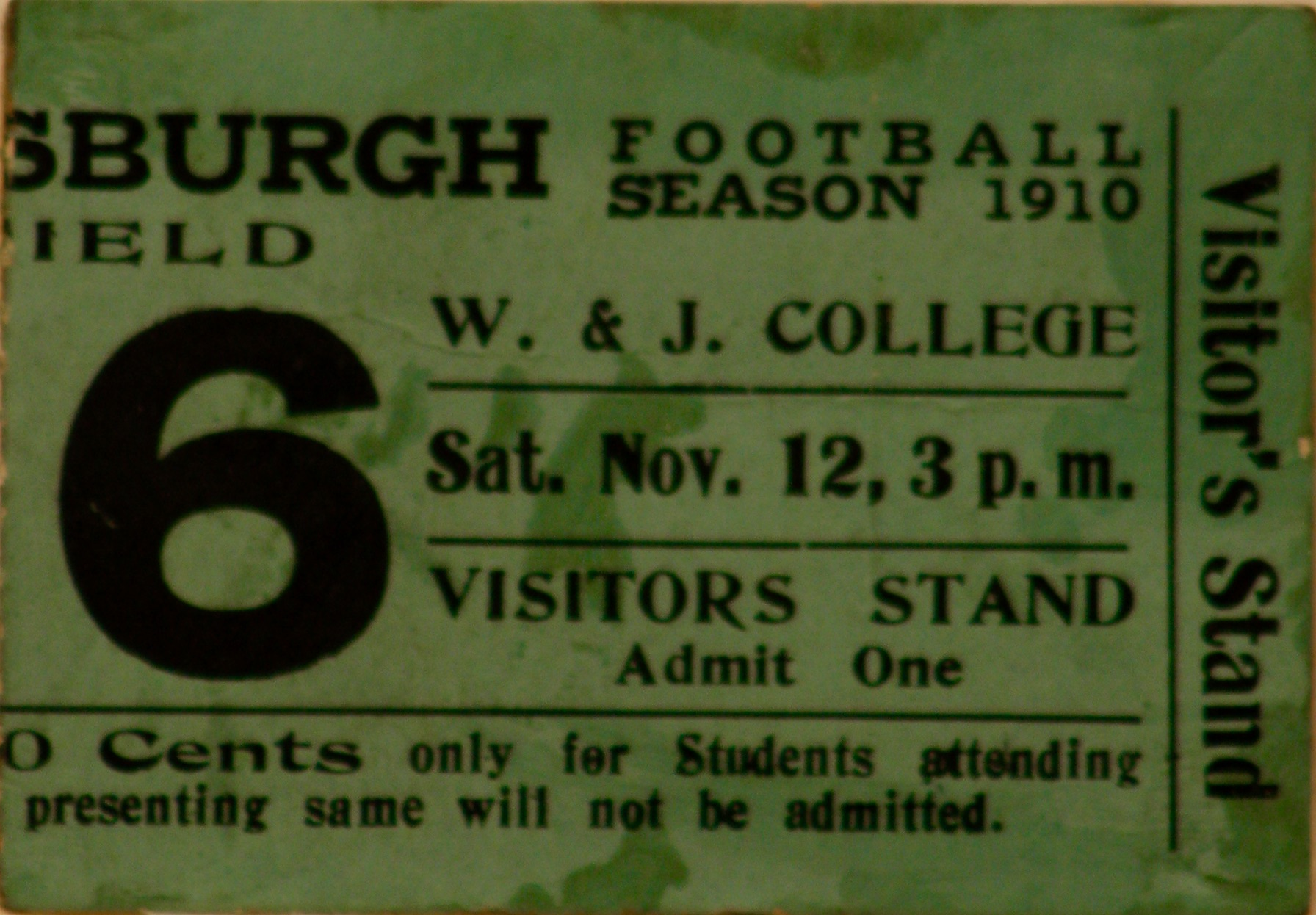
November 12, 1910 Pitt vs. W. & J. game ticket stub

On November 12, the Washington & Jefferson Red and Black tried to defeat the so far undefeated, untied, and unscored upon Pitt eleven at Forbes Field. Twelve thousand raucous fans endured a game-long snowfall to cheer on their team. The Post-Gazette noted "It was a cheering duel throughout. The Pitt men were in the east bleachers with a band and they gave their cheers and yells, while in the western part of the field the W. & J. men held out. They cheered everybody connected with W. & J. During the intermission the Pitt students paraded around the gridiron, making a big "P" in the center of the field."

Due to the inclement weather, the game turned into a punting duel. The first quarter was played in the Red and Black territory but the Pitt offense could not capitalize. They advanced the ball to the eight-yard line and turned it over on downs. On their next possession center Ralph Galvin missed a twenty-two yard field goal.

Early in the second quarter the Pitt offense moved the ball to the W. & J. six-yard line and fullback Tex Richards fumbled. W. & J. punted and Galvin missed a thirty-three yard field goal. After another W. & J. punt, the Pitt offense broke the scoring drought with a three yard scamper by Tillie Dewar. Galvin missed the extra point and the score was 5 to 0 Pitt at halftime.

The second half mirrored the first with much punting and good defense from both teams. On Pitt's first possession, Galvin kicked a twenty-four yard field goal to extend the lead to 8 to 0. Pitt guard George Bailey and Red and Black quarterback Forsythe traded punches and the officials disqualified them both. At the end of the third quarter Galvin missed a chip shot field goal.

With less than five minutes to go in the game Tex Richards completed a forward pass to Norman Budd on the Red and Black three-yard line. Richards scored on the next play and Galvin connected on the point after to make the final score 14 to 0. Pitt beat the Red and Black for only the third time, and improved their record against them to 3–8. W. & J. would finish the season with a 3-3-1 record.

The Pitt starting lineup for the game against Wash. & Jeff. was Jack Lindsay (right end), James Stevenson (right tackle), Karl Dallenbach (right guard), Ralph Galvin (center), Henry Blair (left guard), George Bailey (left tackle), Robert Peacock (left end), Tillie Dewar (quarterback), William Hittner (left halfback), George Brown (right halfback), and Tex Richards (fullback). Substitutions made during the game were: Ray Butler replaced Robert Peacock at left end; George Gehlert replaced George Bailey at left tackle; Hube Wagner replaced Jack Lindsay at right end; Norman Budd replaced Tillie Dewar at quarterback; Charles Quailey replaced George Brown at right halfback; Dave Richards replaced Tex Richards at fullback; and Charles Reed replaced Ray Butler at left end. The game consisted of fifteen-minute quarters.

=== Carnegie Tech ===
Week 8: Carnegie Tech at Pitt

Team	1	2	3	4	Total
Carnegie Tech	0	0	0	0	0
• Pitt	6	23	0	6	35

- Date: November 19, 1910
- Location: Forbes Field
  Pittsburgh, PA
- Referee: D. W. Merriman (Geneva)

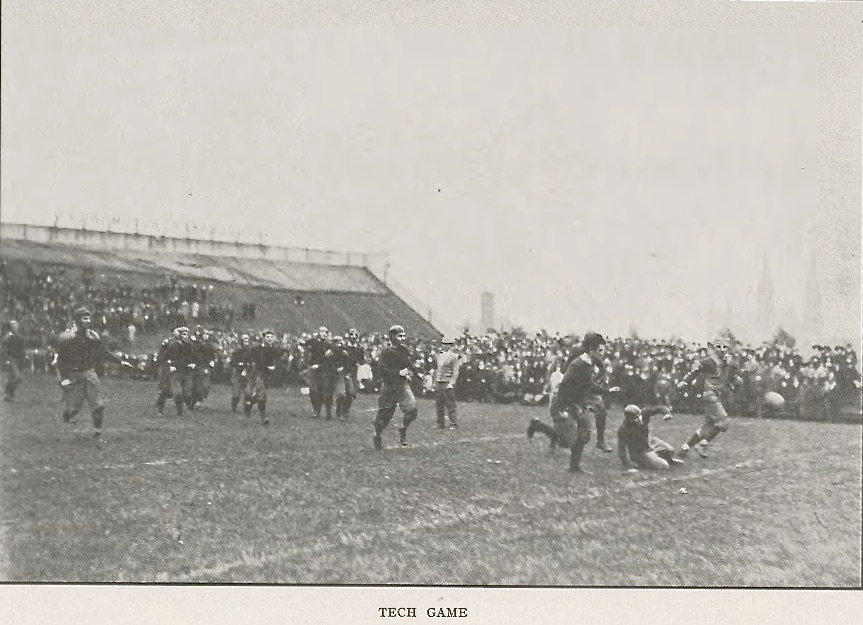
1910 Pitt versus Carnegie Tech game action

On November 11, the Tartans of Carnegie Tech closed their season at Forbes Field against city neighbor and rival Pitt. The Tartans record was 1–5–1.

Pitt received the kick-off and quarterback Norman Budd fumbled on the 10-yard line. The Tartans recovered and immediately lined up for a field goal. Tech fullback Hull missed. Pitt was offside and the ball moved to the five. They attempted another field goal. Hull kicked and the ball sailed wide right. Led by Norman Budd, angry at fumbling, the Pitt offense scored in three plays. Center Ralph Galvin added the extra point for a six point lead.

The Pitt offense romped in the second quarter. Galvin intercepted a Tech pass and Budd scored his second touchdown a few plays later. Pitt end Robert Peacock recovered an onside kick on the Tech two-yard line. Halfback George Brown scored on the next play. Halfback Charles Quailey completed a long pass to end Jack Lindsey to the Tech two-yard line. Quailey plunged into the end zone for the score. Robert Peacock recovered a blocked punt and raced in for the score. Galvin connected on three extra points to make the score 29 to 0 at halftime.

The third quarter was scoreless as Jack Lindsey missed a thirty-seven yard field goal. Dave Richards scored a touchdown in the fourth quarter and Galvin made the extra point to make the final tally 35 to 0.

The Pitt starting lineup for the game against Carnegie Tech was Jack Lindsay (right end), James Stevenson (right tackle), George Gehlert (right guard), Ralph Galvin (center), Henry Blair (left guard), George Bailey (left tackle), Robert Peacock (left end), Norman Budd (quarterback), Charles Quailey (left halfback), George Brown (right halfback), and Hube Wagner (fullback). Substitutions made during the game: Dave Richards replaced Hube Wagner at fullback; Hube Wagner replaced Robert Peacock at left end; Charles Reed replaced Hube Wagner at left end; Walter Hinchman replaced Henry Blair at left guard; Ray Butler replaced Jack Lindsay at right end; and Tillie Dewar replaced Norman Budd at quarterback. The game consisted of ten-minute quarters.

=== Penn State ===
Week 9: Penn State at Pitt

Team	1	2	3	4	Total
Penn State	0	0	0	0	0
• Pitt	5	0	0	6	11

- Date: November 24 , 1910
- Location: Forbes Field
  Pittsburgh, PA
- Referee: Lt. H. B. Hackett (West Point)

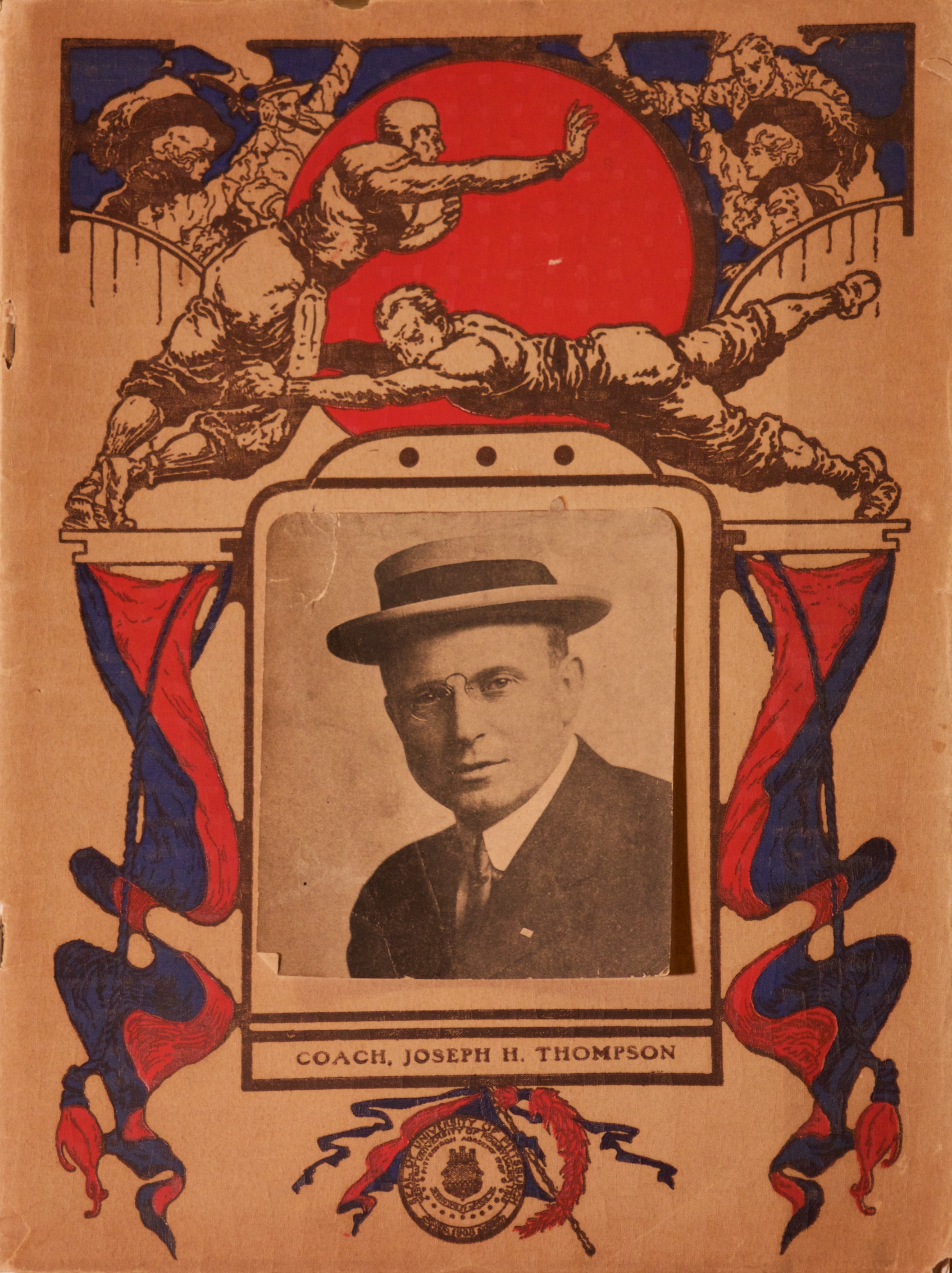
1910 Pitt football yearbook used for Pitt vs. Penn State game program

On Thanksgiving afternoon eighteen thousand fans from all parts of the state congregated at Forbes Field to see if the Pitt eleven could complete the season unbeaten, untied and unscored upon. Both student sections had their band parade them to the stadium and entertain the crowd with their fight songs. The Nittanies had an impressive 5–1–1 record and were favored by the odds makers to win the game. Both teams were healthy and the weather was perfect at kick-off. Rain fell during the second half which caused some slipping by the running backs but the crowd stayed until the referee called time.

The game started out as a defensive battle with much punting. On Pitt's second possession Ralph Galvin missed a forty-two yard field goal. On Pitt's next possession Tex Richards completed a pass to William Hittner to the seven yard line of State. First down: Hittner gained four yards to the three. Second down: Tillie Dewar gained one yard to the two. Third down: George Brown fumbled but Karl Dallenbach recovered on the one foot line. Fourth down: Tex Richards plunged into the end zone. Galvin missed the point after and Pitt led 5 to 0 at the end of the first quarter.

In the scoreless second quarter, Galvin missed a forty-five yard field goal. State College completed a forty yard pass play to the Pitt ten-yard line, with George Brown making a touchdown saving tackle for Pitt. The Pitt defense then stiffened and State turned the ball over on downs.

The third quarter was a continuation of the punting duel. State fans were encouraged when center Watson intercepted a pass and had a clear field in front of him but he slipped on the mud.

Pitt owned the fourth quarter. After Weaver of State College intercepted a Richards pass, State attempted a quick kick. The punt was shanked and ended up in Pitt end Hube Wagner's hands. He ran unmolested for a forty-five touchdown. Galvin made the point after and the score was 11 to 0. A few possessions later Norman Budd returned a punt fifty-five yards for a touchdown but Pitt was called for an illegal block. State College could not penetrate the Pitt defense and the game ended a short while later with Pitt in possession on their fifty yard line.

Pitt earned possession of the Spalding Trophy for a year.

The Pitt starting lineup for the game against Penn State was Jack Lindsay (right end), James Stevenson (right tackle), Karl Dallenbach (right guard), Ralph Galvin (center), Henry Blair (left guard), George Bailey (left tackle), Robert Peacock (left end), Tillie Dewar (quarterback), William Hittner (left halfback), George Brown (right halfback), and Tex Richards (fullback). Substitutions made during the game were: Ross Feightner replaced Karl Dallenbach at right guard; George Gehlert replaced Ross Feightner at right guard; Norman Budd replaced Tillie Dewar at quarterback; Tillie Dewar replaced George Brown at right halfback; Charles Quailey replaced Tillie Dewar at right halfback; and Hube Wagner replaced Tex Richards at fullback. The game consisted of fifteen-minute quarters.

== Scoring summary ==
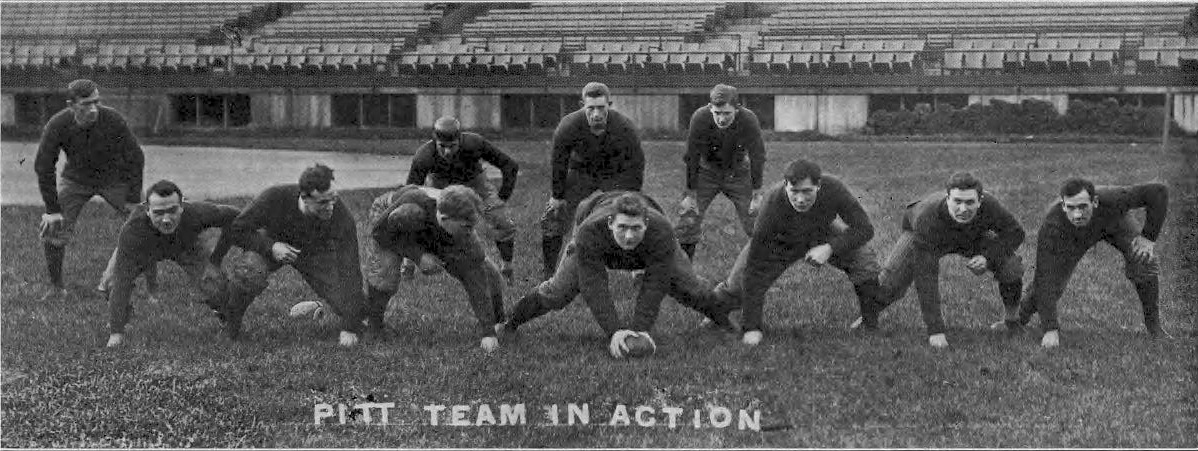
Pitt team In Action

1910 Pittsburgh Panthers scoring summary
Player	Touchdowns	Extra points	Field goals	Safety	Points
Ralph Galvin	4	37	5	0	72
Tex Richards	14	0	0	0	70
Norman Budd	8	0	0	0	40
Tillie Dewar	5	0	0	0	25
George Brown	4	0	0	0	20
William Hittner	2	0	0	0	10
Hube Wagner	2	0	0	0	10
Robert Peacock	2	0	0	0	10
Dave Richards	2	0	0	0	10
Jack Lindsay	0	0	1	1	5
Charles Quailey	1	0	0	0	5
Rosenbloom	1	0	0	0	5
Totals	45	37	6	1	282

== Postseason awards and honors ==
- The 1910 Pitt team has been recognized as a co-national champion by the National Championship Foundation. However, Pitt did not play games against any of the leading football teams and Harvard was recognized as champion by more selectors.
- Two Pittsburgh players were recognized by at least one selector on the 1910 College Football All-America Team. They are: fullback Tex Richards (Pittsburgh Dispatch, 1st team); and center Ralph Galvin (Pittsburgh Dispatch, 1st team; Pittsburgh Leader, 1st team).
