= Joseph Thomson =

Joseph or Joe Thomson is the name of:

- J. J. Thomson (1856–1940), British physicist
- Joseph Thomson (cricketer) (1877-1953), Australian cricketer
- Joseph Thomson (explorer) (1858–1895), African explorer
- Joseph Angus Thomson (1856–1943), Australian politician
- Joe Thomson (1948–2018), Scottish lawyer and academic
- Joe Thomson (footballer) (born 1997), Scottish footballer

== See also ==
- Joseph Thompson (disambiguation)
