= Pocket schedule =

Small pocket-sized guide

A pocket schedule or fixtures card is a small card or foldable paper guide which typically fits in a wallet or pocket. A typical pocket schedule may contain a full season match schedule for the team, including dates, match times, and opponents. It may also include venue information, contact information for purchasing tickets, promotional events, major sponsor advertising, and radio and television broadcast data.

It is most often used by sports clubs or their sponsors for marketing purposes, which often pay for the production and printing of the schedules.

Pocket schedules for ice hockey date back to at least the early 1900s, and those for baseball to at least 1903.

They are part of sports memorabilia that are difficult to find in the secondary market because so many are damaged.
