= Joe Thompson vs Walter Clarke =

Joe Thompson vs Walter Clarke was decided in December 1817.

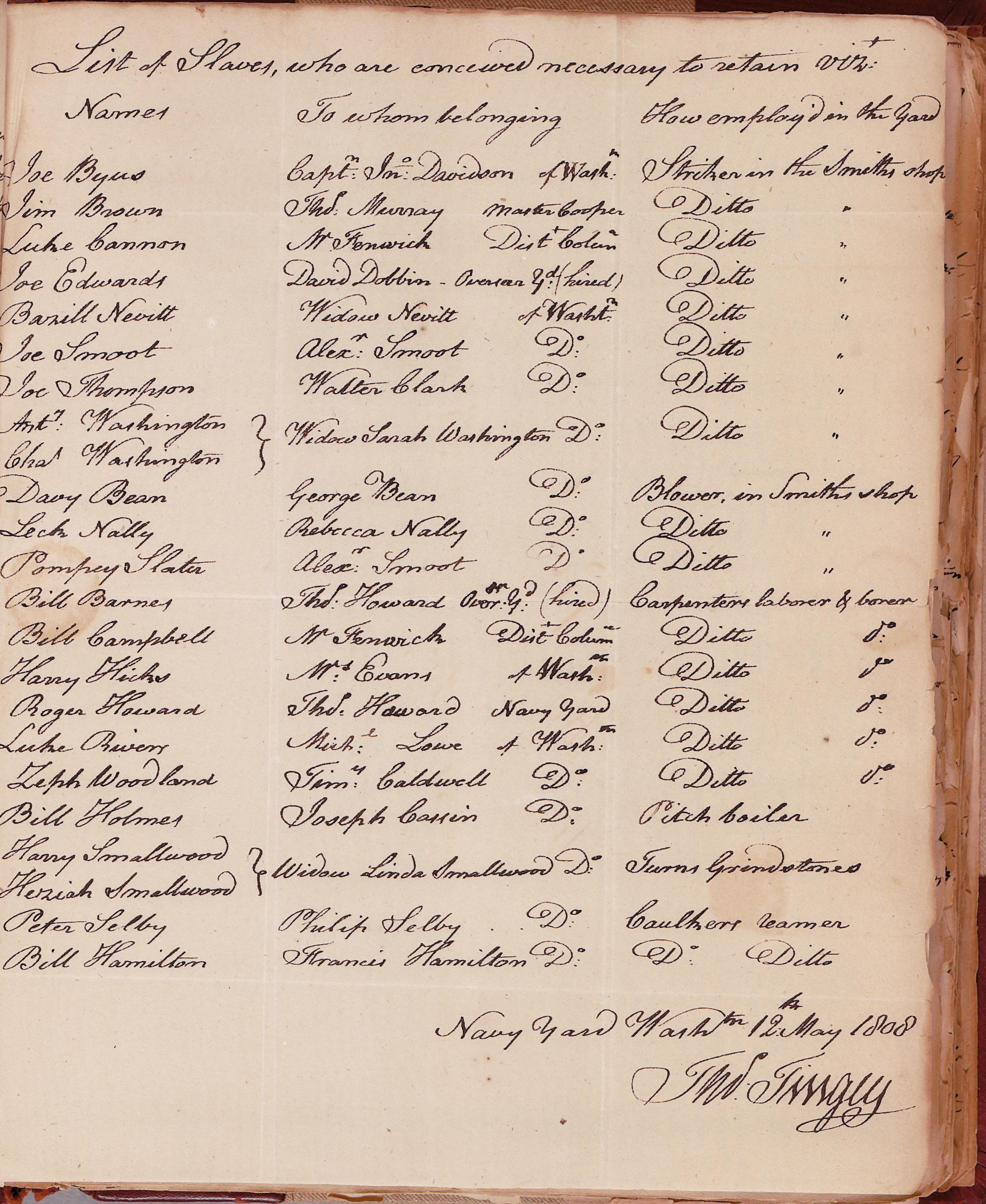
12 May 1808 list of slaves and slaveholders at the Washington Navy Yard signed by Commodore Thomas Tingey. On list is Joe Thompson blacksmith striker, slave of Walter Clark, who finally won his freedom in a noted 1817 court case; Joe Thompson vs Walter Clark. Francis Scott Key was his attorney.

== Background and facts ==
Joe Thompson was born circa 1784 in St. Mary's County, Maryland where he was enslaved to a prosperous farmer and slaveholder John Thompson. John Thompson died in 1804. In a 21 February 1805 estate inventory of real and personal property, Joe Thompson is enumerated among the 24 listed slaves. In this document, Joe Thompson's age is given as 21 years. John Thompson's last will pronounced his strong desire that most of his slaves, including Joe and his wife Nell, be prospectively manumitted after a period of 10 years in servitude. The younger enslaved individuals were to be likewise freed after other specified periods. Most slaves in the District of Columbia were "slaves for life." However a slave granted a prospective manumission became "a term slave". For a slaveholder to free a slave by manumission, was to reduce the total value of his or her estate.

Even manumission by last will and testament was not always secure, for heirs often challenged such testamentary manumissions in court. While John Thompson's will had made provisions for his widow Elizabeth, she through her attorney challenged the will, especially the testamentary manumissions. Following her death, she left the residue of her estate to her brother-in-law Walter Clarke (1777–1846), who had married Anne Thompson and subsequently became the estate's administrator. Walter Clarke moved into the district circa 1798, where he became a prominent businessman who served the District of Columbia as an alderman and later on the Board of Appeals. Walter Clarke was a slaveholder in his own right, purchasing and utilizing slaves both for his business and household. Clarke quickly moved to set aside the provisions of John Thompson's will. As administrator, Clarke held Joe, Nell, and their daughter Sarah Ann as slaves after 1808. Clarke also appeared as a juror in an early and highly significant petition for freedom case, Ben v. Sabret Scott (1807).

About 1808, Clarke leased Joe Thompson to the Washington Navy Yard, where Thompson worked as a blacksmith striker for many years. For the first thirty years of the nineteenth century, the navy yard was the District's principal employer of enslaved African Americans. Their numbers rose rapidly and by 1808, the enslaved made up one-third of the workforce. During this era, the navy yard was "a favorite place to rent out slaves," and to sell them; but quickly became a recognized center of resistance.

The number of enslaved workers gradually declined during the next thirty years, though free and some enslaved African Americans remained a vital presence. One such person was a former slave, later freeman, Michael Shiner, whose diary chronicled his life and work at the navy yard for over half a century The majority of District slaveholders appear to have negotiated their own rental contracts with the navy yard. Exactly when Joe Thompson was employed at the navy yard is unknown, the first surviving document enumerating Thompson dates from 12 May 1808. This document written to answer a query from the Secretary of the Navy provides the names of slaves and slaveholders. Typically to get their bondsmen on the navy payroll, some owners dealt directly with the master mechanics, especially those in the blacksmith shop, while others bargained with the Commandant or the Secretary of the Navy. Most slave rentals were private transactions and except for the notations of wages paid and the names of the slaveholder, few details are known. In some instances, the enslaved conducted their own negotiations with an employer and arranged self-hire Note in the 1811 payroll (see thumbnail) Thompson and the other enslaved workers were paid 85 cents per day while the typical white blacksmith earned $1.80 per day. Joe Thompson and his wife Nelly, age 22, must have kept careful track of the terms of John Thompson's will. At the navy yard, the enslaved workforce was far from passive; on 1 August 1809 Commodore Thomas Tingey complained to Secretary of the Navy Paul Hamilton regarding black freeman and ship caulker Henry Adams, who had the courage to write Hamilton requesting the same wages as white men: "I am concerned that you should be thus pestered with, and will certainly endeavor to discover, who it is thus prone to disturb or destroy the regulations & discipline of this yard, by aiding such men as Adams with their pens and stimulating them to troublesome acts. Henry Adams, "Sir, is an ignorant impertinent Negro man, who however, it is allowed, is a good journeyman caulker,...."

The work environment at the shipyard, blacksmith shop was rough and at times brutal. Naval Yard architect Benjamin Latrobe, writing to a friend on 5 October 1811, described Joe Thompson's boss, master blacksmith Benjamin King as, "He [King] has been swearing and whipping his black Strikers at a terrible rate these two days past over it." King a slaveholder himself, was an outspoken advocate for enslaved labor. In 1809 King disclosed, "Experience has pointed out the utility of employing for Strikers Black Men in preference to white & of them Slaves before Freemen – The Strict distinction necessary to be kept up in the shop is more easily enforced."

As early as 1815, the Board of Navy Commissioners complained of "maimed & unmanageable slaves." Somehow Joe Thompson found his way to Francis Scott Key, who had represented other petitioners for freedom, and put together this case as soon as the 10 years were up. Key, a noted attorney in the first two decades of the nineteenth century, although a slaveholder himself, had a reputation for offering his services free to slaves and former slaves. In 1815 Joe Thompson filed a petition for freedom in which he was represented by Key and Augustus Taney, brother of Supreme Court Justice Roger B. Taney, and author of Dred Scott v. Sandford. The Thompson freedom petition was decided in favor of the plaiintiff in December 1817.

== Ruling and scope ==
The Circuit Court of the District of Columbia with Judge William Cranch presiding held "If a testator by his will manumits his slaves after a certain term of service, and the widow renounces the provision made for her by the will and adheres to her rights under the law of Maryland, and there is sufficient personal estate to satisfy her thirds without resorting to the slaves, they will be entitled to their freedom, although the executor should have assigned them to the widow in part satisfaction of her claim."

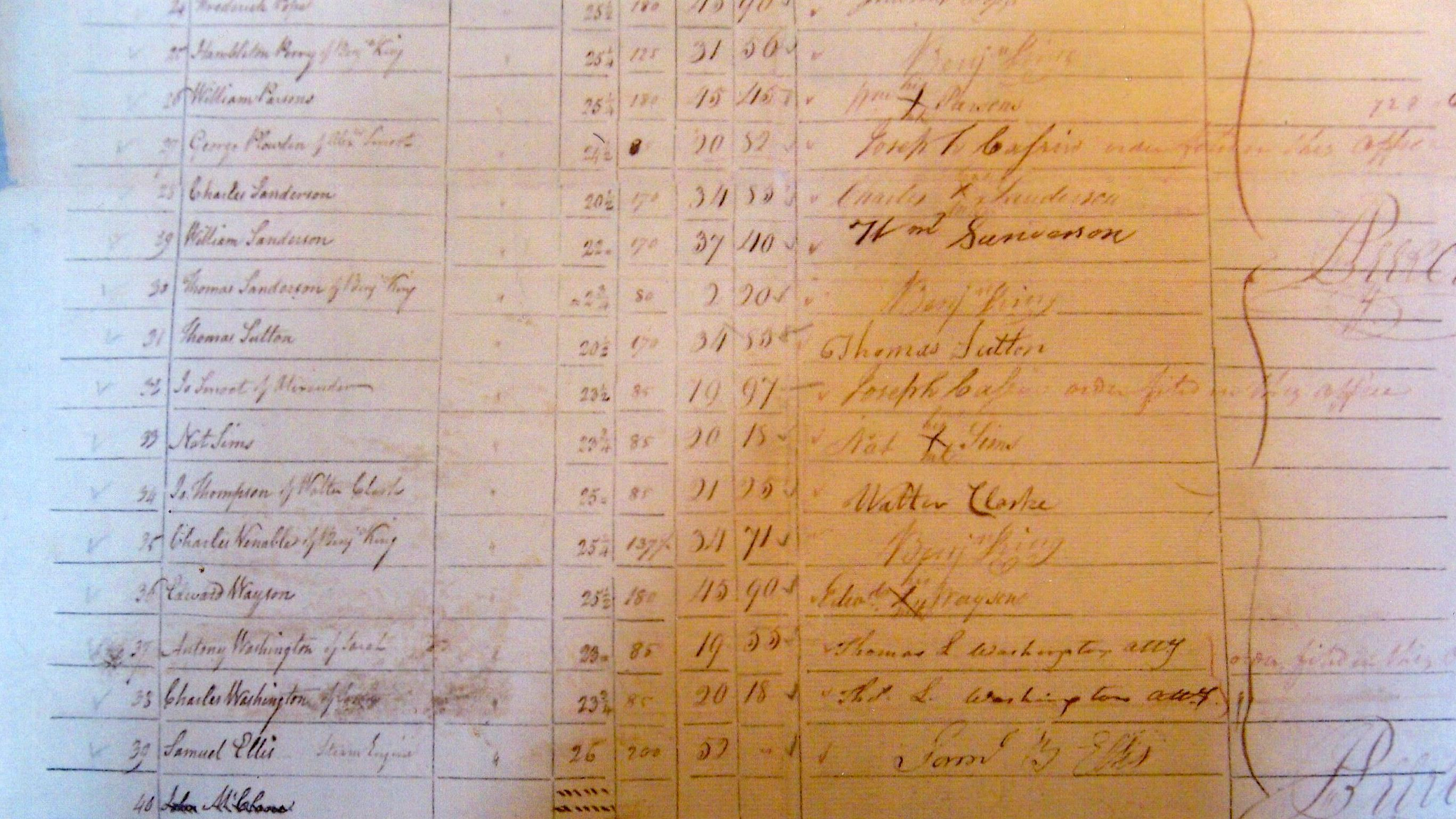
July 1811 Washington Navy Yard payroll of blacksmiths # 34 blacksmith Jo Thompson's monthly pay signed by slaveholder Walter Clarke. Although enslaved Jo Thompson later took Clarke to court in Clarke v Thompson.

Following his manumission, Joe Thompson continued to work at the Washington Navy Yard blacksmith shop as a blacksmith striker. He is listed on the 1819 payroll of mechanics and laborers, as a blacksmith striker pay rate $1.12 per day, on the April 1829 list of persons employed at the Washington Navy Yard, Thompson's again appears with the shipyard blacksmith shop employees, pay-rate $1.12 per diem. The compilers specifically noted Joe Thompson as "free.". On the same 1829 list of black free and enslaved employees is celebrated diarist Michael Shiner. On the list, Shiner is enumerated as a slave of the clerk of the yard, Thomas Howard. In that year Shiner was working in the navy yard "ordinary" where his occupation is given as "O.S." or Ordinary Seaman. This was a common subterfuge of the era to avoid restrictions on the employment of enslaved labor. Shiner's wages are recorded as $10.00 per month, but were collected by Thomas Howard.

News of the favorable verdict for Thompson spread rapidly within the navy yard African American community. Michael Shiner, in similar circumstances, and scheduled to be prospectively manumitted after a period of 10 years in servitude. However, in 1836 faced with a reluctant estate administrator, Shiner who had worked with Joe Thompson for years, chose to adopt the same freedom petition strategy. On 25 March 1836 Shiner acting through his attorney, filed a successful petition for freedom.

Joe Thompson vs Walter Clarke, while favorable, to the plaintiff, the unique facts of the case in that "the widow renounces the provision made for her" limited the scope of the decision. This meant as a matter of law, the Thompson case had limited application, as the verdict, hinged on a plainly written testamentary manumission. Such testamentary manumissions were often successfully challenged in court.see Bell vs. Stephenson 1835. The ruling although limited in scope, would have made "a significant impression at the Navy Yard", especially on Thompson's fellow workers and freedom seekers Michael Shiner and Daniel Bell.

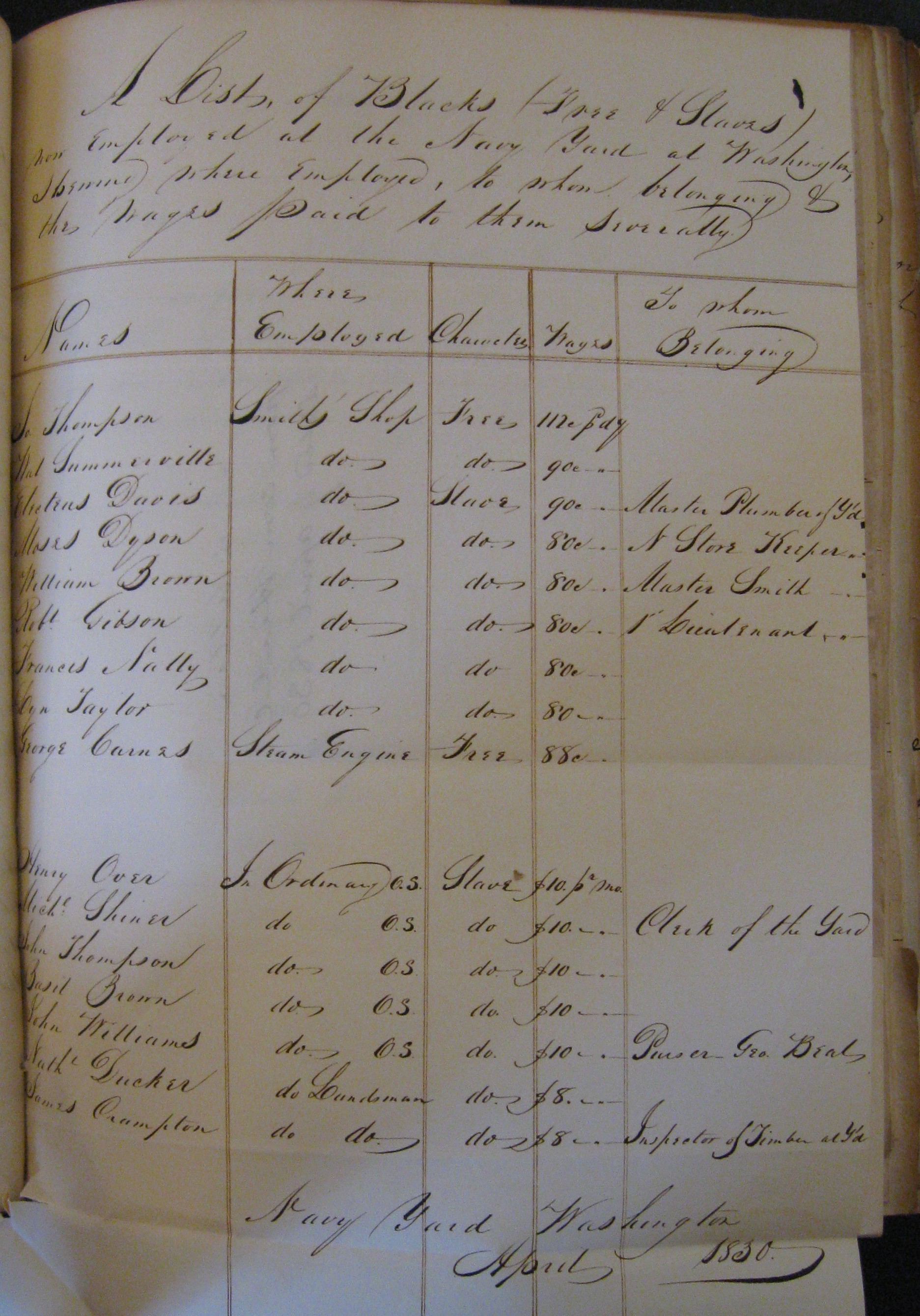
April 1829 list of enslaved and free blacks with diarist Michael Shiner and successful litigant Joe Thompson of Thompson v Clarke
