= Joseph H. Thompson =

American politician (1871–1928)

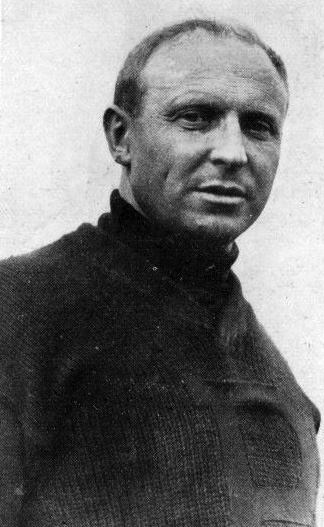
- 1909 photo of Joe Thompson during his Pitt coaching years

- Title: Halfback

Personal information
- Born: 26 September 1871; Kilkeel, County Down, Ireland
- Died: 1 February 1928 (aged 56); Beaver Falls, Pennsylvania, U.S.

Career information
- College: Geneva College; Western University (PA)

Career history

Playing
- 1900–1902?: Geneva
- 1904–1906: Western University (PA)

Coaching
- 1900–1902?: Geneva
- 1907: Carnegie Tech
- 1909–1912: Pittsburgh

Awards and highlights
- National champion (1910)
- College Football Hall of Fame (Class of 1971)

Other information
- Military career
- Allegiance: United States
- Branch: U.S. Army
- Service years: 1917–1919 (active duty)
- Rank: Colonel
- Units: 110th Infantry, 28th Division
- Conflicts: World War I
- Awards: Medal of Honor

Member of the Pennsylvania Senate from the 47th district
- In office 1913–1916

Personal details
- Party: Republican
- Occupation: Lawyer

Joseph Henry "Colonel Joe" Thompson (26 September 1871 – 1 February 1928) was a highly decorated World War I veteran, recipient of the Medal of Honor, lawyer, Pennsylvania state senator, head football coach of the University of Pittsburgh Panthers, and College Football Hall of Fame inductee.

== College years ==
=== Geneva College ===
Thompson came to the United States from Ireland in 1898 at the age of 18 and entered Geneva College that year. He immediately became a basketball star and also participated in gymnastics and wrestling, but did not go out for football until 1900. He served as Geneva's player-coach for three years, with his football teams compiling a 27–2–3 record.

=== University of Pittsburgh ===
Thompson continued his education at the University of Pittsburgh, then called the Western University of Pennsylvania, where he played football from 1904 and 1906, during which time the Panthers compiled a 26–6 record. He captained the Pitt football team to its first perfect season in 1904 when the Panthers won all ten games and surrendered only one touchdown. Thompson graduated from Pitt in 1905 and continued on with post-graduate work in the School of Law completing his law degree. While at Pitt he was a member of the Phi Gamma Delta fraternity.

== Professional life ==
=== Coaching ===
Following graduation from Pitt's law school, Thompson assumed the head coaching position at Pitt from 1909 to 1912, during which period he led Pitt to a 22–11–2 record. The highlight of his coaching tenure was the 1910 season in which Pitt went undefeated and unscored upon and was considered by many to be that season's national champion. While compiling its 9–0 record, Pitt outscored its opponents 282–0. During this time, he attended the University of Pittsburgh School of Law, graduating in 1909, and was admitted to the bar.

A song to Thompson was written to honor him as football coach at Pitt. Entitled "Joe Thompson" it was sung to the tune of the American folk song "Old Black Joe" by Stephen Foster.

Who plans the plays to spring upon the foe?

Who fought for Wup, five years or more ago?

Who's still for Pitt, does anybody know?

Just hear those loyal rooters shouting:

Joe! Joe! Joe!
REFRAIN.

We're coming, we're coming;

We have the foe in tow,

So here's a cheer for Pittsburgh dear

And Joe! Joe! Joe!

While at Pitt, Thompson also coached the track and field team beginning in 1904. At various points, he also coached football at Pittsburgh High School and Carnegie Technical Schools—now known as Carnegie Mellon University—and was Rochester High School's first football coach.

=== Politics and law ===
Thompson represented the 47th District as a member of the Republican Party in the Pennsylvania State Senate from 1913 to 1916 and practiced law in Beaver Falls, Pennsylvania until his death in 1928 from ailments aggravated by war wounds.

== Hall of Fame ==
Thompson was inducted into the National Football Foundation's College Football Hall of Fame in 1971 and has been inducted into the Beaver County Sports Hall of Fame in 1977.

== Military service ==
A page from the 1920 Pitt student yearbook

Thompson enlisted in the Pennsylvania National Guard's Company H, 14th Infantry Regiment on 16 February 1905. He was promoted to second lieutenant on 1 November 1906; to captain in Company B, 10th Infantry, Pennsylvania National Guard on 16 December 1909; to major on 29 June 1912; to lieutenant colonel on 28 October 1918; and finally to colonel on 15 March 1919. While serving in WWI he was wounded four times: on 29 September 1918; 30 September 1918; 1 October 1918; and again on 1 October 1918, when he was gassed. He remained on duty after each instance. As of 12 April 1919, he was commanding the 110th Infantry Regiment. Thompson initially returned to the United States on 11 May 1919. He returned to France in June 1919, in order to redeploy the 110th Infantry Regiment to the United States. He was discharged from active duty in December 1919.

While serving in France with the 110th Infantry, then Major Thompson was awarded the Distinguished Service Cross for his valor on 1 October 1918, during which action he was wounded for the fourth time. This decoration was subsequently upgraded to the Medal of Honor on 5 October 1925. His four wounds entitled him to wear four wound chevrons (the precursor to the Purple Heart which was reestablished by the President of the United States per War Department General Orders 3, 1932) on his uniform's lower right sleeve.

== Medal of Honor citation ==
Rank and organization: Major, U.S. Army, 110th Infantry, 28th Division. Place and date: At Apremont, France; 1 October 1918. Entered service at: Beaver Falls, Pa. Born: 26 September 1871; Kilkeel, County Down, Ireland. General Orders: War Department, General Orders No. 21 (5 October 1925).

Citation:

Counterattacked by two regiments of the enemy, Major Thompson encouraged his battalion in the front line by constantly braving the hazardous fire of machineguns and artillery. His courage was mainly responsible for the heavy repulse of the enemy. Later in the action, when the advance of his assaulting companies was held up by fire from a hostile machinegun nest and all but one of the six assaulting tanks were disabled, Major Thompson, with great gallantry and coolness, rushed forward on foot three separate times in advance of the assaulting line, under heavy machinegun and antitank-gun fire, and led the one remaining tank to within a few yards of the enemy machinegun nest, which succeeded in reducing it, thereby making it possible for the infantry to advance.

== Military awards ==
Thompson's military decorations and awards include:

1st row	Medal of Honor		
2nd row	World War I Victory Medal w/one silver service star to denote credit for the Champagne-Marne, Aisne-Marne, Oise-Aisne, Meuse-Argonne and Defensive Sector battle clasps.	Ordre national de la Légion d'honneur degree of Knight (French Republic)	Croix de guerre 1914–1918 w/ bronze palm (French Republic)

== Head coaching record ==
=== College football ===
Year	Team	Overall	Conference	Standing	Bowl/playoffs
Carnegie Tech Tartans (Independent) (1907)
1907	Carnegie Tech	1–8			
Carnegie Tech:		1–8			
Pittsburgh Panthers (Independent) (1909–1912)
1909	Pittsburgh	6–2–1			
1910	Pittsburgh	9–0			
1911	Pittsburgh	4–3–1			
1912	Pittsburgh	3–6			
Pittsburgh:		22–11–2			
Total:		23–19–2			
National championship Conference title Conference division title or championship game berth

== See also ==
- List of Medal of Honor recipients
