= Joseph Atang Thompson =

Nigerian footballer

Joe Thompson
Personal information
- Full name: Joseph Steven Atang Thompson
- Date of birth: 14 February 1989 (age 37)
- Place of birth: Lagos, Nigeria
- Height: 1.82 m (6 ft 0 in)
- Position: Midfielder

Team information
- Current team: Shabab Al-Ghazieh
- Number: 2

Senior career*
Years	Team	Apps	(Gls)
2006–2008	Cotonsport Garoua		
2008–2009	Enyimba International F.C.		
2009–2012	Kano Pillars F.C.		
2012–2016	Enyimba International F.C.		
2017 –	Shabab Al-Ghazieh		

International career
2008	Nigeria U-20		
- * Club domestic league appearances and goals as of 9 November 2013

Joseph Steven Atang Thompson (born 14 February 1989) is a Nigerian football player currently with Shabab Al-Ghazieh.

== Career ==
Thompson began his career with Cotonsport Garoua as a member of the Rudder Sports Management and moved in 2008 to Enyimba International F.C., after only one year he signed with Kano Pillars F.C. On 6 January 2011 was linked with Sporting Kansas City. He returned to Enyimba following the end of the 2012 season.

== International ==
He has played with the Nigeria national under-20 football team.
