= Joe Thompson (pilot) =

Second World War airplane pilot

Joe Thompson Jr.
- First Lieutenant Thompson in 1943
- Born: Joseph Thomson Jr. June 8, 1919; Nashville, Tennessee
- Died: March 24, 2012 (aged 92); Nashville
- Military career
- Allegiance: United States
- Army Air Force/Corps: United States Army Aerial reconnaissance
- Service years: 1941–1945
- Rank: Major
- Nickname: "Tiger Joe"
- Unit: 67th Tactical Reconnaissance Squadron, 9th Air Force; 109th Tactical Reconnaissance Squadron; 66th RAF Squadron
- Conflict: World War II; Battle of Normandy; Battle of the Bulge
- Awards: Distinguished Flying Cross (US); Croix de Guerre (France); Legion of Honor (France)
- Other work: Insurance executive

Joseph Thompson Jr. (1919–2012) was a decorated World War II pilot from Tennessee, who later in life became active in Nashville civic affairs. Nicknamed "Tiger Joe", Major Thompson flew 90 combat missions in 1944 for the Allied forces in Europe, most behind German lines, performing aerial reconnaissance. He received the Croix de Guerre from France and the Distinguished Flying Cross from the US for his role in liberating France from Nazi Germany. Thompson was awarded France's highest honor, the Legion of Honor on March 15, 2012, shortly before his death on March 24, 2012.

Thompson published a book in 2006 entitled, Tiger Joe: A Photographic Diary of a World War II Aerial Reconnaissance Pilot.

== Early years ==
Thompson is a descendant of one of Nashville's founding families. His great-great-grandfather, Thomas Thompson (1759–1837), was one of middle Tennessee's earliest settlers, arriving from North Carolina in the winter of 1779 to a site that would become the city of Nashville. He was one of 256 colonists in 1780 who signed the Cumberland Compact. For serving in the American Revolutionary War in 1774, he received a Revolutionary War land grant of 640 acres in Tennessee located near the junction of Nashville's Franklin Road and Thompson Lane, which marks the original northern edge of the property. "Thompson Lane" was named for the family, and it remains in modern times as one of the city's large thoroughfares. The family's ancestral home, called "Glen Leven", was built on the property in 1857, and Joe Thompson Jr. was born there on June 8, 1919.

He graduated from Wallace University School and Vanderbilt University (1941). During his college days he began taking flying lessons in a civilian flight training program his senior year and accumulated 15 hours of flying time in a Piper Cub. He was interested in photography and became a photographer for the college yearbook.

== Military service ==
=== Enlistment and training ===
Thomson enlisted in the Army Air Corps in August, 1941. The recruiter promised him a military occupational specialty that would combine both photography and flying, namely aerial reconnaissance. At age 22, he left home driving with three other enlistees in a Model A Ford to Hicks Field near Ft. Worth, Texas. While training there Thompson received letters from home that were addressed to "Tiger Joe Thompson" and his fellow pilots seized on the nickname which quickly became unshakable. The name had nothing to do with his military service; it was given to him as a teenager after his performance in a boxing match. For over a year, Thompson advanced through various training centers, each with increasing flying skill requirements, from Hicks Field to Randolph Field, both in Texas. He was at Randolph when Pearl Harbor was attacked. He received his commission as a second lieutenant, then entered extended training in aerial reconnaissance.

=== Serving with the RAF ===
In September, 1942, he was deployed to England. About this time, the German Luftwaffe greatly outnumbered the Royal Air Force (RAF) and the RAF suffered heavy losses, to the extent that its attrition outstripped the production of new aircraft and the training of pilots. Thompson was one of the American pilots assigned to shore up the RAF's lost personnel. He was not formally trained as a fighter pilot and said, "I was in no way ready for combat". Nevertheless, he was assigned to the 66th RAF Squadron and received on-the-job training to provide escort for B–25s and other bombers. In this endeavor protecting the bombers, the pilots flew Supermarine Spitfires in three rows of four, above the bombers they were protecting. From this position, they could dive down and gain valuable speed to catch and surprise the German pilots. Many of these RAF pilots were seasoned veterans who had fought in the Battle of Britain in 1940, and Thompson learned much from them. "I was flying with the best", he said. He soon realized that being the greenhorn American, he was always assigned to the top row of the flight group, the last to go down to engage the enemy.

=== Artillery ranging ===
On February 10, 1944, Thompson was designated for a mission to aid Allied ground forces who were pinned down near Mesenich, a German town on the Moselle River. Thompson was skilled in obtaining specialized aerial photographs of enemy positions using a new and highly secret technique which made it possible for Allied artillery to hit a target accurately with the first round. It was developed in early 1941 by a British engineer, John Merton, and was known as "Merton Grid Obliques". The technique involved two photographs of the same terrain, taken from slightly different vantage points, and superimposed on a grid that could provide specific coordinates of a target. It involved risk for a pilot to obtain such photographs; he had to fly at 3000 feet over enemy positions for about three minutes on a straight and level path (within the ideal range of anti-aircraft fire). This scenario was an anti-aircraft gunner's dream. Thompson accomplished it by first flying in zig-zag maneuvers, then diving steep from 12,000 feet. Coming out of the dive at 350 mph, he turned his cameras on and flew a prescribed heading over the enemy front, as German flak bursts followed his track. A second spotter plane radioed to him how close the flak was to his plane, since Thompson could not see behind him. On cue, at the last possible second, he pulled up and hard to his right, just as a flak burst exploded on his left. It would have destroyed him had he pulled left where the gunner expected him to be. He said later that he thought the enemy gunners underestimated how fast the P–51 Mustangs could fly. The footage he obtained using the Merton grid allowed unparalleled accuracy for Allied artillery, a complete surprise to the enemy forces who believed there must have been some sort of secret weapon guiding the ordnance.

=== June 6, 1944 (D–Day) ===
Dust jacket of Thompson's book (published 2006)

Recalling what happened during the first week of June, 1944, Thompson said, "We all knew something was up". The number of their reconnaissance missions had tripled. Two days before the Allied invasion date known as D–Day (June 6, 1944), Thompson flew a mission that included photographing a list of sites over France, one of which was called "Grandcamp". It was a German battery overlooking a sandy outcropping now known as Omaha Beach. Thompson had no idea of its significance at the time. He said, "...there were gun emplacements there and command wished to know whether the recent bombings had destroyed them all...Unfortunately, I believe there were some still operative". When he landed after this mission on June 4, 1944, coming to a stop on the tarmac with his plane's propeller blades still turning, a young soldier in a jeep screeched his tires, stopping by Thompson's plane to remove the film. He drove it to Eisenhower's headquarters at Wilton House in Salisbury, about 20 miles away. In his later book, Crusade in Europe, Eisenhower said, "Airplane photography searched out even minute details...[and] information so derived was available to our troops within a matter of hours." Thompson photographed German troop movements during the Battle of the Bulge.

=== Dead stick landing ===
On one of his missions over France, anti-aircraft fire penetrated his P-51 Mustang aircraft just behind his cockpit; it destroyed his camera equipment, severed the hydraulic lines and stopped the engine. As he was about to parachute out, the engine inexplicably started again and enabled him to fly to an airstrip 20 miles away but quit again before he could land. He landed the plane with a "dead stick" hitting the runway at an angle and with no brakes.

=== Awards ===
For his military service, he received the Croix de Guerre from France and the Distinguished Flying Cross with 15 Oak leaf clusters and six Bronze Stars from the US for his role in liberating France from Nazi Germany. Thompson was awarded France's highest honor, the Legion of Honor on March 15, 2012, shortly before he died.

== Post-war activities ==
Thompson married Martha Crook (1925–2020) of Jackson, Tennessee in 1948. They were together for over 60 years and had four children. After the war, Thompson built a life insurance career spanning several decades and was recognized with a number of national honors in that industry. He was president of the Nashville Area Chamber of Commerce in 1979. His charity fundraising was extensive and he served on many boards.

As the great-great-great-great-grandnephew of Revolutionary War officer Colonel Jeremiah Olney, the Rhode Island Society of the Cincinnati elected him as a hereditary member in 1993. For 16 years, Thomson delivered a popular annual lecture to the students of Montgomery Bell Academy about his war remembrances. About 1995, Lucas G. Boyd conducted a series of interviews with Thompson in a photo-by-photo format in preparation for an exhibit as part of this lectureship, (Note: Photographic prints and digital scans from Thompson’s negatives were made possible by the Nashville Public Library Foundation.) which was later presented at the Tennessee State Museum. In 2004 and 2005, Alice Swanson, a library volunteer, conducted a total of over five hours of additional interviews in which Thompson provided a story-by-story recollection of his military experiences. These include the friendships and connections he made with comrades and with European citizens that he maintained the rest of his life.

In addition to his reconnaissance photos, Thompson made hundreds of personal photos of ordinary people and the places he saw during the war. He used a Zeiss Ikonta camera and developed the film in his tent at night. He mailed the developed film home and his mother resupplied him with new film regularly. He published these photos in a book in 2006 entitled, Tiger Joe: A Photographic Diary of a World War II Aerial Reconnaissance Pilot.

In 2008, Thompson loaned his flight mission logbook to the Special Collections Division of the Nashville Public Library, making it available to the public for research, under special conditions. This logbook documented every flight he made, beginning during his training in 1941 and continuing through the war until his return to the United States in 1945. In his 90s his health began to fail; he developed dementia leading to his death on March 24, 2012.
