= 1910 college football rankings =

- Season: 1910
- Bowl season: 1910–11 bowl games
- End of season champions: Harvard

The 1910 college football season rankings included a ranking by New York City newspaper The Sun.

== The Sun ==
In November 1910, New York City newspaper The Sun ranked the top-ten Eastern teams.

Rank	Team	Record
1	Harvard	9–0–1
2	Penn	9–1–1

== See also ==
- 1910 College Football All-America Team
