= 1910 Connecticut Aggies football team =

American college football season

1910 Connecticut Aggies football
- Conference: Athletic League of New England State Colleges
- Record: 1–5–1 (0–1 New England)
- Head coach: M. F. Claffey (1st season)
- Home stadium: Athletic Fields

The 1910 Connecticut Aggies football team represented Connecticut Agricultural College, now the University of Connecticut, in the 1910 college football season. The Aggies were led by first-year head coach M. F. Claffey, and completed the season with a record of 1–5–1.

== Schedule ==
Date	Opponent	Site	Result	Source
September 24	at Springfield Training School*	Springfield, MA	L 0–16	
October 1	at Wesleyan*	Andrus Field; Middletown, CT	L 0–30	
October 8	Williston*	Athletic Fields; Storrs, CT	L 0–16	
October 15	Rockville High School*		W 12–0	
October 29	Rhode Island State	Athletic Fields; Storrs, CT (rivalry)	L 0–33	
November 4	at Norwich*	Northfield, VT	L 0–22	
November 19	Boston College*	Athletic Fields; Storrs, CT	T 0–0	
*Non-conference game
