= Arthur McKean =

American politician

Biographical details
- Born: March 13, 1882; Lower Burrell, Pennsylvania, U.S.
- Died: January 7, 1957 (aged 74); New Kensington, Pennsylvania, U.S.

Playing career

Football
- 1901: Geneva
- 1903: Geneva

Baseball
- c. 1903: Geneva

Coaching career (HC unless noted)

Football
- 1907–1911: Geneva

Basketball
- 1909–1911: Geneva

Head coaching record
- Overall: 12–24–7 (football); 15–8–1 (basketball)

Arthur McKean (March 13, 1882 – January 7, 1957) was an American college football and college basketball coach, lawyer, judge, and politician. He served as the head football coach at Geneva Collegein Beaver Falls, Pennsylvania from 1907 to 1911, compiling a record of 12–24–7. McKean served one term in the Pennsylvania House of Representatives after being elected in 1910. He was the Western Pennsylvania prohibition administrator during the presidency of Woodrow Wilson and later was a municipal judge in Orlando, Florida.

== Coaching career ==
McKean was the sixth head football coach at Geneva College in Beaver Falls, Pennsylvania, serving for five seasons, from 1907 to 1911 and compiling a record of 10–24–7. Under McKean, the Geneva decided to join forces with five other colleges to abolish the game of football if significant rules changes were not made to make the game safer.

McKean played football and baseball at Geneva when he was a student.

== Politics and law ==
McKean was elected to the Pennsylvania House of Representatives as a Democrat in 1910. He also served various local political positions and maintained a law practice.

== Death ==
McKean died on January 7, 1957, at Citizens General Hospital in New Kensington, Pennsylvania.

== Head coaching record ==
=== Football ===
Year	Team	Overall	Conference	Standing	Bowl/playoffs
Geneva Covenanters (Independent) (1907–1911)
1907	Geneva	4–5–2			
1908	Geneva	1–6–2			
1909	Geneva	4–2			
1910	Geneva	2–5–2			
1911	Geneva	1–6–1			
Geneva:		12–24–7			
Total:		12–24–7			
