= Timothy F. Larkin =

American football coach and quarterback (died 1960)

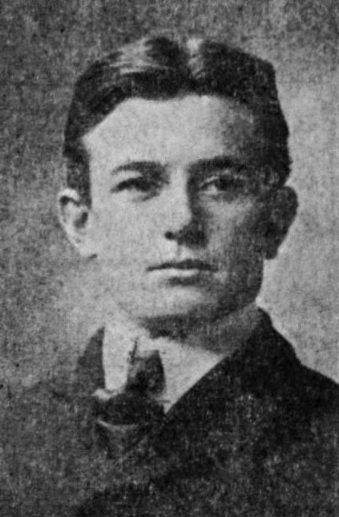
- Larkin pictured in The Boston Globe, 1907

Biographical details
- Born: Worcester, Massachusetts, U.S.
- Died: January 14, 1960

Playing career
- 1902–1904: Holy Cross
- Position: Quarterback

Coaching career (HC unless noted)
- 1905: Milford HS (MA)
- 1905–1906: Worcester Academy (MA)
- 1907–1912: Holy Cross

Head coaching record
- Overall: 18–25–8 (college)

Timothy Francis Larkin (died January 14, 1960) was an American football player and coach at the College of the Holy Cross.

== Personal life ==
Larkin was born in Worcester, Massachusetts to William and Honora (Dunleavy) Larkin. Larkin's brother, William J. Larkin, was a longtime newspaper editor in Worcester. Larkin married Gertrude Gallagher, a pianist and music teacher.

== Football ==
Larkin attended Worcester Classical High School, where he played two years at quarterback and was the coxswain on the school's rowing team in 1901. He played quarterback for Holy Cross from 1902 to 1904 and was captain of the 1904 Holy Cross football team.

In 1905, Larkin led Milford High School to a Midland League championship in his first season as head coach. He finished the season at the Worcester Academy and returned for the 1906 season. He served as the head football coach at the College of the Holy Cross in Worcester, Massachusetts from 1907 to 1912 and compiled a 18-25-8.

== Professional career and public service ==
Larkin followed his brother into journalism, working for the Worcester Gazette, The Boston Globe, The Springfield Union, and the Associated Press. Larkin studied law at Boston University and earned a law degree in 1909.

From 1910 to 1912, Larkin was a member of the Worcester school committee. He was an inspector for Southbridge, Webster, and Worcester wards 1, 2, 5, 8, 9, & 10 during 1910 United States census and for Worcester Wards 4–8 during the 1915 Massachusetts census.

In 1923 and 1924, Larkin ran Camp Bristol, a boy's summer camp on Mount Hope Bay in Bristol, Rhode Island.

Larkin died on January 14, 1960.

== Head coaching record ==
=== College ===
Year	Team	Overall	Conference	Standing	Bowl/playoffs
Holy Cross (Independent) (1907–1912)
1907	Holy Cross	1–7–2			
1908	Holy Cross	4–4			
1909	Holy Cross	2–4–2			
1910	Holy Cross	3–3–2			
1911	Holy Cross	4–5			
1912	Holy Cross	4–3–1			
Holy Cross:		18–25–8			
Total:		18–25–8			
