= Harry Nelly =

American football player, coach, and US Army officer (1878–1928)

Biographical details
- Born: January 1, 1878; West Virginia, U.S.
- Died: December 14, 1928 (aged 50); Chicago, Illinois, U.S.

Playing career
- 1895: West Virginia
- 1899–1901: Army

Coaching career (HC unless noted)
- 1908–1910: Army

Head coaching record
- Overall: 15–5–2

Henry Meredith Nelly (January 1, 1878 – December 14, 1928) was an American college football player and coach and United States Army officer. He served as the head football coach at the United States Military Academy from 1908 to 1910, compiling a record of 15–5–2. Nelly was born on January 1, 1878, in West Virginia. He died in 1928.

== College football ==
=== Playing career ===
Nelly first played college football for the West Virginia Mountaineers in the 1890s. During the team's 1895 season, he played as a substitute back.

While attending the United States Military Academy (USMA; "West Point"), Nelly was a star player for the Army Cadets football team. He graduated the United States Military Academy in 1902.

=== Coaching career ===
For six seasons, Nelly was a coach for Army's football team. For three of these season (1907–1910) he was head coach.

In one season, he persuaded his former West Virginia Mountaineers teammate Fielding H. Yost to assist Army in its practices ahead of the Army–Navy Game.

==== Head coaching record ====
Year	Team	Overall	Conference	Standing	Bowl/playoffs
Army Cadets (Independent) (1908–1910)
1908	Army	6–1–2			
1909	Army	3–2			
1910	Army	6–2			
Army:		15–5–2			
Total:		15–5–2			

=== Officiating career ===
Nelly served as an official for many college football games, often acting as umpire or referee. Into the 1920s, Nelly continued to officiate college games.

== Military career ==
Nelly fought in Europe during World War I. His military career also saw him serve in The Philippines, China, and Panama.

By the mid-1920s, Nelly had relocated to Chicago, Illinois, and was a colonel in the Army. He worked in Chicago as a member of the staff of the VI Corps.

== Death ==
Nelly died on December 14, 1928 at the age of 50 from at Washington Park Hospital in Chicago from intestinal ailment He had been seriously sick for a week prior to his death. He was survived by his wife, Blanche M. Nelly, as well as a son (Robert M. Nelly Jr.) and a daughter.
