= 1910 Massachusetts Aggies football team =

American college football season

1910 Massachusetts Aggies football
- Conference: Athletic League of New England State Colleges
- Record: 1–6–2 ( Athletic League of New England State Colleges)
- Head coach: Willard Gildersleeve (1st season)
- Home stadium: Alumni Field

The 1910 Massachusetts Aggies football team represented Massachusetts Agricultural College in the 1910 college football season. The team was coached by Willard Gildersleeve and played its home games at Alumni Field in Amherst, Massachusetts. The 1910 season was Gildersleeve's only as head coach of the Aggies. Massachusetts finished the season with a record of 1–6–2.

== Schedule ==
Date	Opponent	Site	Result	Attendance	Source
September 24	Rhode Island State	Alumni Field; Amherst, MA	T 0–0		
October 1	at Dartmouth	Alumni Oval; Hanover, NH	L 0–6		
October 8	at Trinity (CT)	Trinity Field; Hartford, CT	L 3–15		
October 15	Worcester Tech	Alumni Field; Amherst, MA	W 14–5		
October 22	at Maine	Orono, ME	L 2–29		
October 29	at New Hampshire	Manchester, NH (rivalry)	T 0–0	3,000	
November 5	at Tufts	Tufts Oval; Somerville, MA	L 6–7		
November 12	at Springfield Training School	Pratt Field; Springfield, MA	L 3–15		
November 19	at Brown	Andrews Field; Providence, RI	L 0–49		
