= Ray B. Thomas =

American football coach (1884–1931)

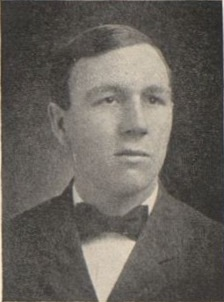
- Thomas in The Ariel (1910) college yearbook of the University of Vermont

Biographical details
- Born: April 11, 1884; Berkshire, Vermont, U.S.
- Died: August 5, 1931 (aged 47); St. Albans, Vermont, U.S.

Playing career

Football
- c. 1905: Brown
- c. 1908: Vermont
- Position: Center

Coaching career (HC unless noted)

Football
- 1909: Vermont
- 1910: New Hampshire
- 1911: New Hampshire

Basketball
- 1910–1911: New Hampshire

Head coaching record
- Overall: 6–7–3 (football); 6–3 (basketball)

Ray Brown Thomas (April 11, 1884 – August 5, 1931) was an American college athlete, coach of college football and college basketball, physician, and medical officer in the United States Army.

== Biography ==
Thomas graduated from Burlington High School in Vermont, then Brown University in Rhode Island, and later earned his medical degree at the University of Vermont in 1910. While at Brown, he played football, baseball, and basketball; he also played football at Vermont.

Thomas served as the head football coach at Vermont in 1909, and at New Hampshire College of Agriculture and the Mechanic Arts (Note: The school became the University of New Hampshire in 1923 and adopted the Wildcats nickname in 1926.) for the full 1910 season and for its final two games of the 1911 season. (Note: Thomas was brought in to lead the 1911 New Hampshire football team for its final two games after the team's first coach resigned after three games and a second coach was dismissed.) He compiled a career college football record of 6–7–3 as a head coach. Thomas was also the head basketball coach at New Hampshire for one season, in 1910–11, tallying a mark of 6–3.

In 1911, he opened a medical office in Enosburgh, Vermont. During World War I, he served as a major in the U.S. Army Medical Corps, and was chief of X-ray services at the Camp McClellan hospital in Alabama. Thomas died in August 1931 at the age of 47, of pneumonia brought on by heat stroke while on duty with the Army Reserve. He was a Freemason and a member of the Episcopal Church; he was survived by his wife, Elizabeth Laird Thomas.

== Head coaching record ==
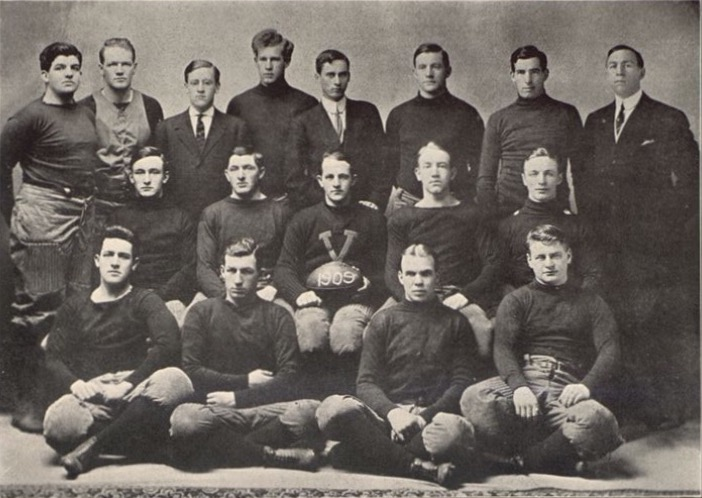
Thomas (standing far right) with the 1909 Vermont football team

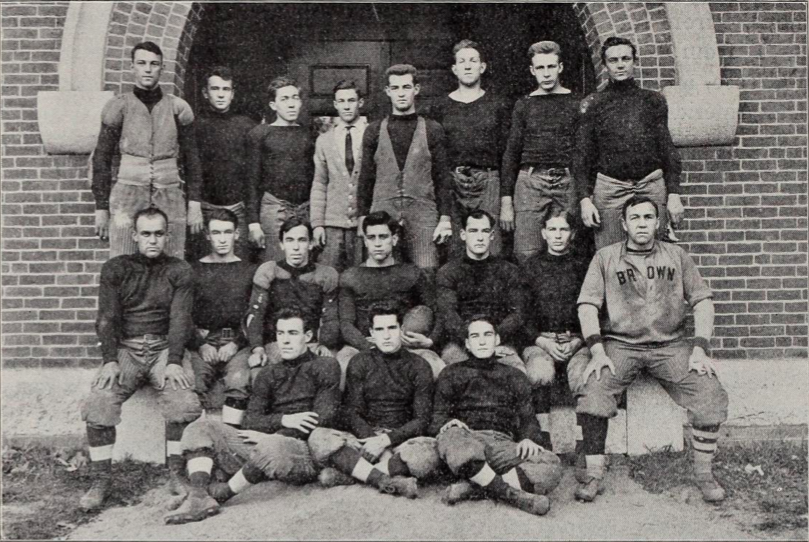
Thomas (seated far right, with "Brown" shirt) with the 1910 New Hampshire football team

=== Football ===
Year	Team	Overall	Conference	Standing	Bowl/playoffs
Vermont Green and Gold (Independent) (1909)
1909	Vermont	4–2–2			
Vermont:		4–2–2			
New Hampshire (Independent) (1910–1911)
1910	New Hampshire	2–3–1			
1911	New Hampshire †	0–2			
New Hampshire:		2–5–1			
Total:		6–7–3			

† Coached team's final two games of the season.
