= 1910 New Hampshire football team =

American college football season

1910 New Hampshire football
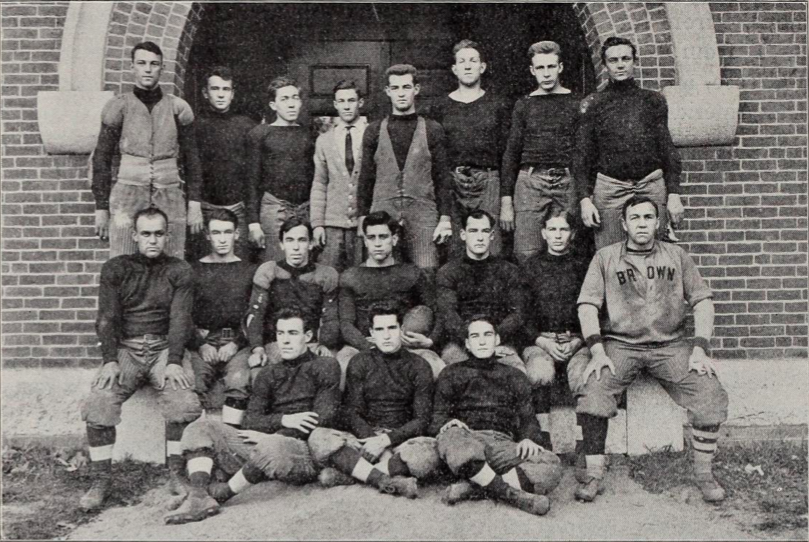
- Coach Ray B. Thomas is seated at far right wearing a "Brown" shirt (his alma mater). Team captain Benjamin F. Proud is holding football, seated center.
- Conference: Independent
- Record: 2–3–1
- Head coach: Ray B. Thomas (1st season)
- Captain: Benjamin F. Proud
- Home stadium: College grounds, Durham, NH

1910 Eastern college football independents records
	Conf.			Overall
Team	W	L	T	W		L		T
Pittsburgh		–		9	–	0	–	0
Harvard		–		9	–	0	–	1
Penn		–		9	–	1	–	1
Princeton		–		7	–	1	–	0
Trinity (CT)		–		7	–	1	–	0
Ursinus		–		6	–	1	–	0
Rhode Island State		–		5	–	1	–	1
Lafayette		–		7	–	2	–	0
Army		–		6	–	2	–	0
Brown		–		7	–	2	–	1
Yale		–		6	–	2	–	2
Dartmouth		–		5	–	2	–	0
Cornell		–		5	–	2	–	1
Penn State		–		5	–	2	–	1
Colgate		–		4	–	2	–	1
Swarthmore		–		5	–	3	–	0
Franklin & Marshall		–		4	–	3	–	2
Syracuse		–		5	–	4	–	1
Rutgers		–		3	–	2	–	3
Carlisle		–		8	–	6	–	0
Holy Cross		–		3	–	3	–	2
Temple		–		3	–	3	–	0
Washington & Jefferson		–		3	–	3	–	1
Wesleyan		–		4	–	4	–	1
New Hampshire		–		2	–	3	–	1
NYU		–		2	–	4	–	1
Geneva		–		2	–	5	–	2
Dickinson		–		3	–	7	–	0
Lehigh		–		2	–	6	–	1
Bucknell		–		2	–	6	–	0
Vermont		–		1	–	5	–	1
Carnegie Tech		–		1	–	6	–	1
Tufts		–		1	–	7	–	1
Boston College		–		0	–	4	–	2
Villanova		–		0	–	4	–	2

The 1910 New Hampshire football team (Note: The school did not adopt the Wildcats nickname until February 1926; before then, they were generally referred to as "the blue and white".) was an American football team that represented New Hampshire College of Agriculture and the Mechanic Arts (Note: The school was often referred to as New Hampshire College or New Hampshire State College in newspapers of the era.) during the 1910 college football season—the school became the University of New Hampshire in 1923. Under first-year head coach Ray B. Thomas, the team finished with a record of 2–3–1.

== Schedule ==
Scoring during this era awarded five points for a touchdown, one point for a conversion kick (extra point), and three points for a field goal. Teams played in the one-platoon system. Games were now played in four quarters; in earlier seasons, two halves were played. This was the first season that "allow[ed] a man to return to the game after once being removed".

Date	Opponent	Site	Result	Attendance	Source
October 1	Boston College	Durham, NH	W 11–0		
October 8	Bowdoin	Durham, NH	L 0–23		
October 15	at Bates	Lewiston, ME	L 0–5		
October 22	USS Tennessee	Durham, NH	W 41–0		
October 29	Massachusetts	Manchester, NH (rivalry)	T 0–0	3,000	
November 12	at Rhode Island State	Kingston, RI	L 0–6		

Massachusetts was coached by Willard Gildersleeve, who had coached New Hampshire the prior season.

== Team ==
Player	Position
Byron H. Clark	Left end
Howard W. Sanborn	Left tackle
Ralph C. Morgan	Left guard
Irving C. Perkins	Center
Frank S. Davison	Right guard
James B. Pettengill	Right tackle
Benjamin F. Proud	Right end
William H. L. Brackett	Quarterback
Thomas J. Twomey	Quarterback
Ray E. Haines	Fullback
Timothy P. Reardon	Fullback
Fred H. Swasey	Right halfback
Philip C. Jones	Left halfback
Clarence M. Lowd	Left halfback

Each of the above players was awarded a varsity letter.

Manager: Charles W. Kemp, class of 1911

Asst. Manager: Leland S. Foster, class of 1912

Myles S. Watson and team manager Kemp were also listed as earning varsity letters.
