= 1910 Lafayette football team =

American football club

1910 Lafayette football
- Conference: Independent
- Record: 7–2
- Head coach: Bob Folwell (2nd season)
- Captain: Edwin Foresman
- Home stadium: March Field

1910 Eastern college football independents records
	Conf.			Overall
Team	W	L	T	W		L		T
Pittsburgh		–		9	–	0	–	0
Harvard		–		9	–	0	–	1
Penn		–		9	–	1	–	1
Princeton		–		7	–	1	–	0
Trinity (CT)		–		7	–	1	–	0
Ursinus		–		6	–	1	–	0
Rhode Island State		–		5	–	1	–	1
Lafayette		–		7	–	2	–	0
Army		–		6	–	2	–	0
Brown		–		7	–	2	–	1
Yale		–		6	–	2	–	2
Dartmouth		–		5	–	2	–	0
Cornell		–		5	–	2	–	1
Penn State		–		5	–	2	–	1
Colgate		–		4	–	2	–	1
Swarthmore		–		5	–	3	–	0
Franklin & Marshall		–		4	–	3	–	2
Syracuse		–		5	–	4	–	1
Rutgers		–		3	–	2	–	3
Carlisle		–		8	–	6	–	0
Holy Cross		–		3	–	3	–	2
Temple		–		3	–	3	–	0
Washington & Jefferson		–		3	–	3	–	1
Wesleyan		–		4	–	4	–	1
New Hampshire		–		2	–	3	–	1
NYU		–		2	–	4	–	1
Geneva		–		2	–	5	–	2
Dickinson		–		3	–	7	–	0
Lehigh		–		2	–	6	–	1
Bucknell		–		2	–	6	–	0
Vermont		–		1	–	5	–	1
Carnegie Tech		–		1	–	6	–	1
Tufts		–		1	–	7	–	1
Boston College		–		0	–	4	–	2
Villanova		–		0	–	4	–	2

The 1910 Lafayette football team was an American football team that represented Lafayette College as an independent during the 1910 college football season. In its second season under head coach Bob Folwell, the team compiled a 7–2 record and shut out seven of its opponents. Edwin Foresman was the team captain. The team played its home games at March Field in Easton, Pennsylvania.

== Schedule ==
Date	Opponent	Site	Result	Source
September 24	Bloomsburg	March Field; Easton, PA	W 31–0	
October 1	Ursinus	March Field; Easton, PA	W 10–0	
October 8	Swarthmore	March Field; Easton, PA	W 6–0	
October 15	Princeton	March Field; Easton, PA	L 0–3	
October 22	Gettysburg	March Field; Easton, PA	W 21–0	
October 29	Bucknell	March Field; Easton, PA	W 12–0	
November 5	at Penn	Franklin Field; Philadelphia, PA	L 0–18	
November 19	Lehigh	March Field; Easton, PA (rivalry)	W 14–0	
November 24	Dickinson	March Field; Easton, PA	W 41–0	
