= 1910 Geneva Covenanters football team =

American college football season

1910 Geneva Covenanters football
- Conference: Independent
- Record: 2–5–2
- Head coach: Arthur McKean (4th season)

1910 Eastern college football independents records
	Conf.			Overall
Team	W	L	T	W		L		T
Pittsburgh		–		9	–	0	–	0
Harvard		–		9	–	0	–	1
Penn		–		9	–	1	–	1
Princeton		–		7	–	1	–	0
Trinity (CT)		–		7	–	1	–	0
Ursinus		–		6	–	1	–	0
Rhode Island State		–		5	–	1	–	1
Lafayette		–		7	–	2	–	0
Army		–		6	–	2	–	0
Brown		–		7	–	2	–	1
Yale		–		6	–	2	–	2
Dartmouth		–		5	–	2	–	0
Cornell		–		5	–	2	–	1
Penn State		–		5	–	2	–	1
Colgate		–		4	–	2	–	1
Swarthmore		–		5	–	3	–	0
Franklin & Marshall		–		4	–	3	–	2
Syracuse		–		5	–	4	–	1
Rutgers		–		3	–	2	–	3
Carlisle		–		8	–	6	–	0
Holy Cross		–		3	–	3	–	2
Temple		–		3	–	3	–	0
Washington & Jefferson		–		3	–	3	–	1
Wesleyan		–		4	–	4	–	1
New Hampshire		–		2	–	3	–	1
NYU		–		2	–	4	–	1
Geneva		–		2	–	5	–	2
Dickinson		–		3	–	7	–	0
Lehigh		–		2	–	6	–	1
Bucknell		–		2	–	6	–	0
Vermont		–		1	–	5	–	1
Carnegie Tech		–		1	–	6	–	1
Tufts		–		1	–	7	–	1
Boston College		–		0	–	4	–	2
Villanova		–		0	–	4	–	2

The 1910 Geneva Covenanters football team was an American football team that represented Geneva College as an independent during the 1910 college football season. Led by fourth-year head coach, Arthur McKean, the team compiled a record of 2–5–2.

== Schedule ==
Date	Opponent	Site	Result	Source
October 1	Bethany (WV)	Beaver Falls, PA	W 8–0	
October 8	at Washington & Jefferson	Washington, PA	T 0–0	
October 15	Allegheny	Meadville, PA	L 0–22	
October 22	at Carnegie Tech	Tech Field; Pittsburgh, PA	L 0–5	
October 29	Grove City	Beaver Falls, PA	L 0–3	
November 3	at Westminster (PA)	New Wilmington, PA	L 2–11	
November 8	at Grove City	Grove City, PA	L 3–9	
November 12	Mount Union	Beaver Falls, PA	T 11–11	
November 19	Muskingum	Beaver Falls, PA	W 17–0	
