= 1910 Rhode Island State football team =

American college football season

1910 Rhode Island State football
- Conference: Independent
- Record: 5–1–1
- Head coach: George Cobb (2nd season)

1910 Eastern college football independents records
	Conf.			Overall
Team	W	L	T	W		L		T
Pittsburgh		–		9	–	0	–	0
Harvard		–		9	–	0	–	1
Penn		–		9	–	1	–	1
Princeton		–		7	–	1	–	0
Trinity (CT)		–		7	–	1	–	0
Ursinus		–		6	–	1	–	0
Rhode Island State		–		5	–	1	–	1
Lafayette		–		7	–	2	–	0
Army		–		6	–	2	–	0
Brown		–		7	–	2	–	1
Yale		–		6	–	2	–	2
Dartmouth		–		5	–	2	–	0
Cornell		–		5	–	2	–	1
Penn State		–		5	–	2	–	1
Colgate		–		4	–	2	–	1
Swarthmore		–		5	–	3	–	0
Franklin & Marshall		–		4	–	3	–	2
Syracuse		–		5	–	4	–	1
Rutgers		–		3	–	2	–	3
Carlisle		–		8	–	6	–	0
Holy Cross		–		3	–	3	–	2
Temple		–		3	–	3	–	0
Washington & Jefferson		–		3	–	3	–	1
Wesleyan		–		4	–	4	–	1
New Hampshire		–		2	–	3	–	1
NYU		–		2	–	4	–	1
Geneva		–		2	–	5	–	2
Dickinson		–		3	–	7	–	0
Lehigh		–		2	–	6	–	1
Bucknell		–		2	–	6	–	0
Vermont		–		1	–	5	–	1
Carnegie Tech		–		1	–	6	–	1
Tufts		–		1	–	7	–	1
Boston College		–		0	–	4	–	2
Villanova		–		0	–	4	–	2

The 1910 Rhode Island State football team was an American football team that represented Rhode Island State College (later renamed the University of Rhode Island) as an independent during the 1910 college football season. In its second year under head coach George Cobb, the team compiled a 5–1–1 record.

== Schedule ==
Date	Opponent	Site	Result	Source
September 24	at Massachusetts	Alumni Field; Amherst, MA	T 0–0	
October 1	at Tufts	Medford, MA	W 5–0	
October 5	at Brown	Andrews Field; Providence, RI (rivalry)	L 0–5	
October 22	St. Andrew's School	Kingston, RI	W 22–0	
October 29	at Connecticut	Athletic Fields; Storrs, CT (rivalry)	W 33–0	
November 5	Worcester Tech	Kingston, RI	W 10–0	
November 12	New Hampshire	Kingston, RI	W 6–0	
