= 1910 Boston College football team =

American college football season

1910 Boston College football
- Conference: Independent
- Record: 0–4–2
- Head coach: Hub Hart (1st season)
- Captains: Ed Hartigan; Dan Hurld

1910 Eastern college football independents records
	Conf.			Overall
Team	W	L	T	W		L		T
Pittsburgh		–		9	–	0	–	0
Harvard		–		9	–	0	–	1
Penn		–		9	–	1	–	1
Princeton		–		7	–	1	–	0
Trinity (CT)		–		7	–	1	–	0
Ursinus		–		6	–	1	–	0
Rhode Island State		–		5	–	1	–	1
Lafayette		–		7	–	2	–	0
Army		–		6	–	2	–	0
Brown		–		7	–	2	–	1
Yale		–		6	–	2	–	2
Dartmouth		–		5	–	2	–	0
Cornell		–		5	–	2	–	1
Penn State		–		5	–	2	–	1
Colgate		–		4	–	2	–	1
Swarthmore		–		5	–	3	–	0
Franklin & Marshall		–		4	–	3	–	2
Syracuse		–		5	–	4	–	1
Rutgers		–		3	–	2	–	3
Carlisle		–		8	–	6	–	0
Holy Cross		–		3	–	3	–	2
Temple		–		3	–	3	–	0
Washington & Jefferson		–		3	–	3	–	1
Wesleyan		–		4	–	4	–	1
New Hampshire		–		2	–	3	–	1
NYU		–		2	–	4	–	1
Geneva		–		2	–	5	–	2
Dickinson		–		3	–	7	–	0
Lehigh		–		2	–	6	–	1
Bucknell		–		2	–	6	–	0
Vermont		–		1	–	5	–	1
Carnegie Tech		–		1	–	6	–	1
Tufts		–		1	–	7	–	1
Boston College		–		0	–	4	–	2
Villanova		–		0	–	4	–	2

The 1910 Boston College football team was an American football team that represented Boston College as an independent during the 1910 college football season. Led by Hub Hart in his first and only season as head coach, Boston College compiled a record of 0–4–2.

== Schedule ==
Date	Opponent	Site	Result	Source
October 1	at New Hampshire	Durham, NH	L 0–11	
October 5	at Andover Academy	Andover, MA	L 0–11	
October 15	at Dean Academy	Franklin, MA	L 8–12	
October 22	at Cushing Academy	Adams athletic field; Ashburnham, MA	T 5–5	
October 29	at Holy Cross	Fitton Field; Worcester, MA (rivalry)	L 3–34	
November 19	at Connecticut	Athletic Fields; Storrs, CT	T 0–0	
