= 1910 Colgate football team =

American college football season

1910 Colgate football
- Conference: Independent
- Record: 4–2–1
- Head coach: Laurence Bankart (1st season)
- Captain: Clarence Turner
- Home stadium: Whitnall Field

1910 Eastern college football independents records
	Conf.			Overall
Team	W	L	T	W		L		T
Pittsburgh		–		9	–	0	–	0
Harvard		–		9	–	0	–	1
Penn		–		9	–	1	–	1
Princeton		–		7	–	1	–	0
Trinity (CT)		–		7	–	1	–	0
Ursinus		–		6	–	1	–	0
Rhode Island State		–		5	–	1	–	1
Lafayette		–		7	–	2	–	0
Army		–		6	–	2	–	0
Brown		–		7	–	2	–	1
Yale		–		6	–	2	–	2
Dartmouth		–		5	–	2	–	0
Cornell		–		5	–	2	–	1
Penn State		–		5	–	2	–	1
Colgate		–		4	–	2	–	1
Swarthmore		–		5	–	3	–	0
Franklin & Marshall		–		4	–	3	–	2
Syracuse		–		5	–	4	–	1
Rutgers		–		3	–	2	–	3
Carlisle		–		8	–	6	–	0
Holy Cross		–		3	–	3	–	2
Temple		–		3	–	3	–	0
Washington & Jefferson		–		3	–	3	–	1
Wesleyan		–		4	–	4	–	1
New Hampshire		–		2	–	3	–	1
NYU		–		2	–	4	–	1
Geneva		–		2	–	5	–	2
Dickinson		–		3	–	7	–	0
Lehigh		–		2	–	6	–	1
Bucknell		–		2	–	6	–	0
Vermont		–		1	–	5	–	1
Carnegie Tech		–		1	–	6	–	1
Tufts		–		1	–	7	–	1
Boston College		–		0	–	4	–	2
Villanova		–		0	–	4	–	2

The 1910 Colgate football team was an American football team that represented Colgate University as an independent during the 1910 college football season. In its first season under head coach Laurence Bankart, the team compiled a 4–2–1 record. Clarence Turner was the team captain. The team played its home games on Whitnall Field in Hamilton, New York.

== Schedule ==
Date	Opponent	Site	Result	Attendance	Source
October 1	Clarkson	Whitnall Field; Hamilton, NY	W 78–0		
October 8	at Brown	Andrews Field; Providence, RI	T 0–0		
October 15	Trinity (CT)	Whitnall Field; Hamilton, NY	L 0–23		
October 22	Middlebury	Whitnall Field; Hamilton, NY	W 51–0		
October 29	at Yale	Yale Field; New Haven, CT	L 0–19		
November 5	at Rochester	Rochester, NY	W 6–5		
November 12	at Syracuse	Archbold Stadium; Syracuse, NY (rivalry)	W 11–6		
