= 1910 Holy Cross football team =

American college football season

1910 Holy Cross football
- Conference: Independent
- Record: 3–3–2
- Head coach: Timothy F. Larkin (4th season)
- Captain: John C. Lawlor
- Home stadium: Fitton Field

1910 Eastern college football independents records
	Conf.			Overall
Team	W	L	T	W		L		T
Pittsburgh		–		9	–	0	–	0
Harvard		–		9	–	0	–	1
Penn		–		9	–	1	–	1
Princeton		–		7	–	1	–	0
Trinity (CT)		–		7	–	1	–	0
Ursinus		–		6	–	1	–	0
Rhode Island State		–		5	–	1	–	1
Lafayette		–		7	–	2	–	0
Army		–		6	–	2	–	0
Brown		–		7	–	2	–	1
Yale		–		6	–	2	–	2
Dartmouth		–		5	–	2	–	0
Cornell		–		5	–	2	–	1
Penn State		–		5	–	2	–	1
Colgate		–		4	–	2	–	1
Swarthmore		–		5	–	3	–	0
Franklin & Marshall		–		4	–	3	–	2
Syracuse		–		5	–	4	–	1
Rutgers		–		3	–	2	–	3
Carlisle		–		8	–	6	–	0
Holy Cross		–		3	–	3	–	2
Temple		–		3	–	3	–	0
Washington & Jefferson		–		3	–	3	–	1
Wesleyan		–		4	–	4	–	1
New Hampshire		–		2	–	3	–	1
NYU		–		2	–	4	–	1
Geneva		–		2	–	5	–	2
Dickinson		–		3	–	7	–	0
Lehigh		–		2	–	6	–	1
Bucknell		–		2	–	6	–	0
Vermont		–		1	–	5	–	1
Carnegie Tech		–		1	–	6	–	1
Tufts		–		1	–	7	–	1
Boston College		–		0	–	4	–	2
Villanova		–		0	–	4	–	2

The 1910 Holy Cross football team was an American football team that represented the College of the Holy Cross in the 1910 college football season.

In its fourth year under head coach Timothy F. Larkin, the team compiled a 3–3–2 record. John C. Lawlor was the team captain.

Holy Cross played its home games at Fitton Field on the college campus in Worcester, Massachusetts.

== Schedule ==
Date	Opponent	Site	Result	Attendance	Source
October 8	at Yale	Yale Field; New Haven, CT	L 0–12	7,000	
October 15	at Springfield Training School	Pratt Field; Springfield, MA	T 0–0	2,000	
October 22	Colby	Fitton Field; Worcester, MA	W 6–0		
October 29	Boston College	Fitton Field; Worcester, MA (rivalry)	W 34–3		
November 5	at Princeton	University Field; Princeton, NJ	L 0–17		
November 12	Worcester Tech	Fitton Field; Worcester, MA	T 0–0	3,000	
November 19	at Tufts	Tufts Oval; Medford, MA	W 14–0	3,500	
November 24	at Rochester	Rochester Baseball Park; Rochester, NY	L 0–3		
