= 1910 NYU Violets football team =

American college football season

1910 NYU Violets football
- Conference: Independent
- Record: 2–4–1
- Head coach: Herman Olcott (4th season)
- Home stadium: Ohio Field

1910 Eastern college football independents records
	Conf.			Overall
Team	W	L	T	W		L		T
Pittsburgh		–		9	–	0	–	0
Harvard		–		9	–	0	–	1
Penn		–		9	–	1	–	1
Princeton		–		7	–	1	–	0
Trinity (CT)		–		7	–	1	–	0
Ursinus		–		6	–	1	–	0
Rhode Island State		–		5	–	1	–	1
Lafayette		–		7	–	2	–	0
Army		–		6	–	2	–	0
Brown		–		7	–	2	–	1
Yale		–		6	–	2	–	2
Dartmouth		–		5	–	2	–	0
Cornell		–		5	–	2	–	1
Penn State		–		5	–	2	–	1
Colgate		–		4	–	2	–	1
Swarthmore		–		5	–	3	–	0
Franklin & Marshall		–		4	–	3	–	2
Syracuse		–		5	–	4	–	1
Rutgers		–		3	–	2	–	3
Carlisle		–		8	–	6	–	0
Holy Cross		–		3	–	3	–	2
Temple		–		3	–	3	–	0
Washington & Jefferson		–		3	–	3	–	1
Wesleyan		–		4	–	4	–	1
New Hampshire		–		2	–	3	–	1
NYU		–		2	–	4	–	1
Geneva		–		2	–	5	–	2
Dickinson		–		3	–	7	–	0
Lehigh		–		2	–	6	–	1
Bucknell		–		2	–	6	–	0
Vermont		–		1	–	5	–	1
Carnegie Tech		–		1	–	6	–	1
Tufts		–		1	–	7	–	1
Boston College		–		0	–	4	–	2
Villanova		–		0	–	4	–	2

The 1910 NYU Violets football team was an American football team that represented New York University as an independent during the 1910 college football season. In their fourth year under head coach Herman Olcott, the team compiled a 2–4–1 record.

== Schedule ==
Date	Opponent	Site	Result	Attendance	Source
October 8	at Princeton	University Field; Princeton, NJ	L 0–12		
October 15	Williams	Ohio Field; Bronx, NY	T 3–3		
October 22	Stevens	Ohio Field; Bronx, NY	W 17–6	2,000	
October 29	Rutgers	Ohio Field; Bronx, NY	W 15–8		
November 8	Trinity (CT)	Ohio Field; Bronx, NY	L 6–12		
November 12	at Wesleyan	Andrus Field; Middletown, CT	L 6–9		
November 19	at Navy	Worden Field; Annapolis, MD	L 0–9		
