= 1910 Yale Bulldogs football team =

American college football season

1910 Yale Bulldogs football
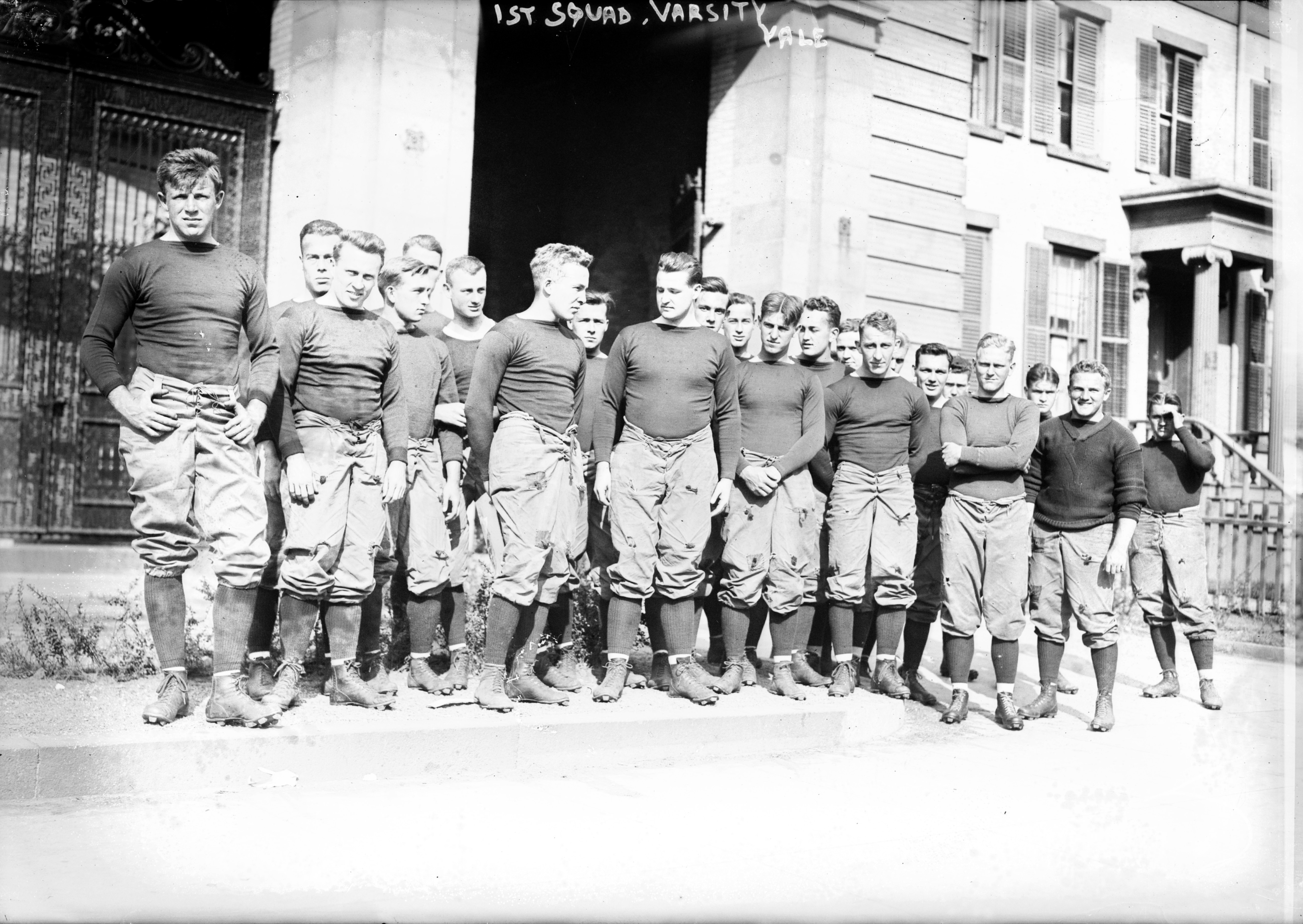
- Conference: Independent
- Record: 6–2–2
- Head coach: Ted Coy (1st season)
- Captain: Fred Daly
- Home stadium: Yale Field

1910 Eastern college football independents records
| | Conf. | | | Overall |
| Team | W | L | T | W | | L | | T |
|---|---|---|---|---|---|---|---|---|
| Pittsburgh | | – | | 9 | – | 0 | – | 0 |
| Harvard | | – | | 9 | – | 0 | – | 1 |
| Penn | | – | | 9 | – | 1 | – | 1 |
| Princeton | | – | | 7 | – | 1 | – | 0 |
| Trinity (CT) | | – | | 7 | – | 1 | – | 0 |
| Ursinus | | – | | 6 | – | 1 | – | 0 |
| Rhode Island State | | – | | 5 | – | 1 | – | 1 |
| Lafayette | | – | | 7 | – | 2 | – | 0 |
| Army | | – | | 6 | – | 2 | – | 0 |
| Brown | | – | | 7 | – | 2 | – | 1 |
| Yale | | – | | 6 | – | 2 | – | 2 |
| Dartmouth | | – | | 5 | – | 2 | – | 0 |
| Cornell | | – | | 5 | – | 2 | – | 1 |
| Penn State | | – | | 5 | – | 2 | – | 1 |
| Colgate | | – | | 4 | – | 2 | – | 1 |
| Swarthmore | | – | | 5 | – | 3 | – | 0 |
| Franklin & Marshall | | – | | 4 | – | 3 | – | 2 |
| Syracuse | | – | | 5 | – | 4 | – | 1 |
| Rutgers | | – | | 3 | – | 2 | – | 3 |
| Carlisle | | – | | 8 | – | 6 | – | 0 |
| Holy Cross | | – | | 3 | – | 3 | – | 2 |
| Temple | | – | | 3 | – | 3 | – | 0 |
| Washington & Jefferson | | – | | 3 | – | 3 | – | 1 |
| Wesleyan | | – | | 4 | – | 4 | – | 1 |
| New Hampshire | | – | | 2 | – | 3 | – | 1 |
| NYU | | – | | 2 | – | 4 | – | 1 |
| Geneva | | – | | 2 | – | 5 | – | 2 |
| Dickinson | | – | | 3 | – | 7 | – | 0 |
| Lehigh | | – | | 2 | – | 6 | – | 1 |
| Bucknell | | – | | 2 | – | 6 | – | 0 |
| Vermont | | – | | 1 | – | 5 | – | 1 |
| Carnegie Tech | | – | | 1 | – | 6 | – | 1 |
| Tufts | | – | | 1 | – | 7 | – | 1 |
| Boston College | | – | | 0 | – | 4 | – | 2 |
| Villanova | | – | | 0 | – | 4 | – | 2 |

The 1910 Yale Bulldogs football team represented Yale University in the 1910 college football season. The Bulldogs finished with a 6–2–2 record under first-year head coach Ted Coy.

Yale end John Kilpatrick was a consensus pick for the 1910 College Football All-America Team, and four other Yale players (quarterback Art Howe, halfback Fred Daly, tackle James W. "Jim" Scully, and a guard with the surname Morris) received first-team All-America honors from at least one selector in 1910.

== Schedule ==
| Date | Opponent | Site | Result | Attendance | Source |
|---|---|---|---|---|---|
| September 28 | Wesleyan | Yale Field; New Haven, CT | W 22–0 | | |
| October 1 | Syracuse | Yale Field; New Haven, CT | W 12–6 | | |
| October 5 | Tufts | Yale Field; New Haven, CT | W 17–0 | | |
| October 8 | Holy Cross | Yale Field; New Haven, CT | W 12–0 | 7,000 | |
| October 15 | at Army | The Plain; West Point, NY | L 3–9 | | |
| October 22 | Vanderbilt | Yale Field; New Haven, CT | T 0–0 | | |
| October 29 | Colgate | Yale Field; New Haven, CT | W 19–0 | | |
| November 5 | Brown | Yale Field; New Haven, CT | L 0–21 | | |
| November 12 | at Princeton | University Field; Princeton, NJ (rivalry) | W 5–3 | | |
| November 19 | Harvard | Yale Field; New Haven, CT (rivalry) | T 0–0 | 33,000 | |

== Roster ==
- Richard W. Baker, HB
- Douglas Bomeisler, E
- Bronson, T
- Springer H. Brooks, E
- Buckingham, G
- Walter C. Camp, FB
- Campbell, T
- Clarence Childs, T
- Coates, E
- Allan L. Corey, QB
- Fred Daly, HB
- Robert C. Deming, HB
- John Field, HB
- Pomeroy T. Francis, T
- Edgar W. Freeman, G
- Myron Fuller, C
- Glover, E
- Greenough, C
- Art Howe, QB
- John Kilpatrick, E
- Erle O. Kistler, HB
- Robert F. Loree, G
- Elmer McDevitt, G
- Henry N. Merritt, QB
- Effingham B. Morris, C
- Parker, G
- Charles H. Paul, G
- Stephen Philbin, FB
- Potter, FB
- James A. Reilly, HB
- Edward Savage, T
- James W. Scully, E
- Edwin A. Strout, QB
- Daniel G. Tomlinson, T
- Tommers, HB
- Van Sinderen, E
- Harry Vaughan, E
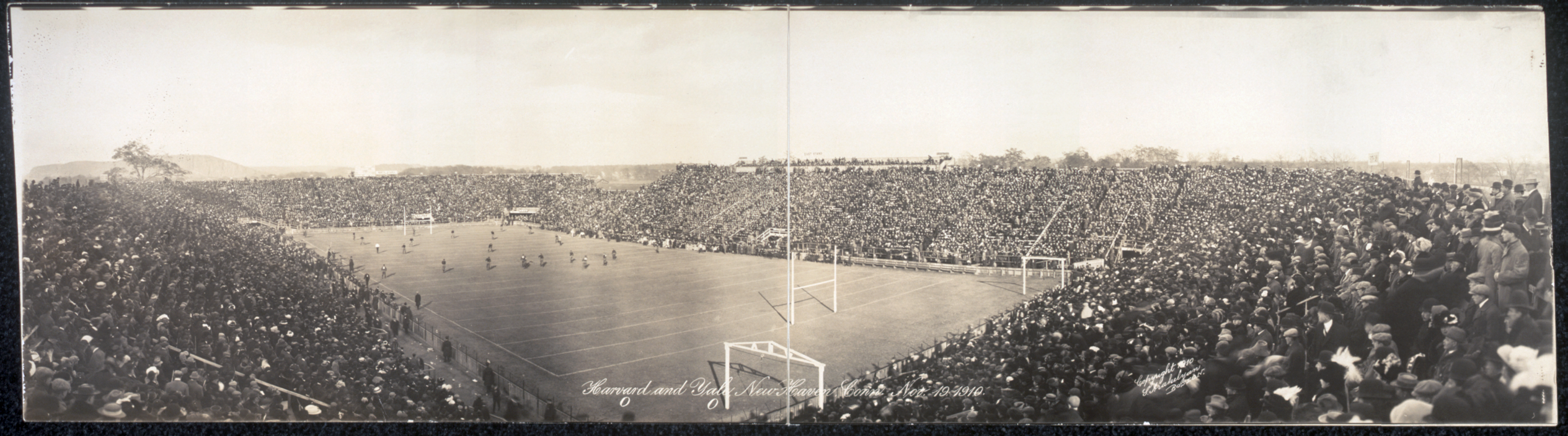
Yale tied Harvard, 0-0.
