= 1910 Penn State Nittany Lions football team =

American college football season

1910 Penn State Nittany Lions football
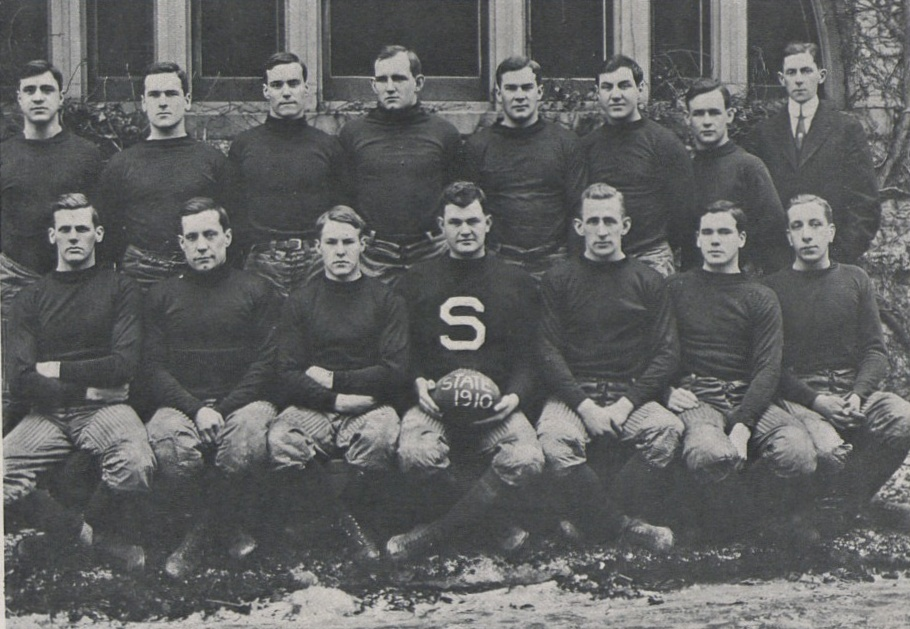
- Conference: Independent
- Record: 5–2–1
- Head coach: Jack Hollenback (1st season)
- Captain: Alex Gray
- Home stadium: New Beaver Field

1910 Eastern college football independents records
	Conf.			Overall
Team	W	L	T	W		L		T
Pittsburgh		–		9	–	0	–	0
Harvard		–		9	–	0	–	1
Penn		–		9	–	1	–	1
Princeton		–		7	–	1	–	0
Trinity (CT)		–		7	–	1	–	0
Ursinus		–		6	–	1	–	0
Rhode Island State		–		5	–	1	–	1
Lafayette		–		7	–	2	–	0
Army		–		6	–	2	–	0
Brown		–		7	–	2	–	1
Yale		–		6	–	2	–	2
Dartmouth		–		5	–	2	–	0
Cornell		–		5	–	2	–	1
Penn State		–		5	–	2	–	1
Colgate		–		4	–	2	–	1
Swarthmore		–		5	–	3	–	0
Franklin & Marshall		–		4	–	3	–	2
Syracuse		–		5	–	4	–	1
Rutgers		–		3	–	2	–	3
Carlisle		–		8	–	6	–	0
Holy Cross		–		3	–	3	–	2
Temple		–		3	–	3	–	0
Washington & Jefferson		–		3	–	3	–	1
Wesleyan		–		4	–	4	–	1
New Hampshire		–		2	–	3	–	1
NYU		–		2	–	4	–	1
Geneva		–		2	–	5	–	2
Dickinson		–		3	–	7	–	0
Lehigh		–		2	–	6	–	1
Bucknell		–		2	–	6	–	0
Vermont		–		1	–	5	–	1
Carnegie Tech		–		1	–	6	–	1
Tufts		–		1	–	7	–	1
Boston College		–		0	–	4	–	2
Villanova		–		0	–	4	–	2

The 1910 Penn State Nittany Lions football team represented the Pennsylvania State University as an independent during the 1910 college football season. The team was coached by Jack Hollenback and played its home games in New Beaver Field in State College, Pennsylvania.

== Schedule ==
Date	Opponent	Site	Result	Attendance	Source
October 1	Harrisburg Athletic Club	New Beaver Field; State College, PA	W 58–0		
October 8	Carnegie Tech	New Beaver Field; State College, PA	W 61–0		
October 15	Sterling Athletic Club	New Beaver Field; State College, PA	W 45–0		
October 22	at Penn	Franklin Field; Philadelphia, PA	L 0–10		
October 29	Villanova	New Beaver Field; State College, PA	T 0–0		
November 5	St. Bonaventure	New Beaver Field; State College, PA	W 34–0		
November 12	Bucknell	New Beaver Field; State College, PA	W 45–3		
November 24	at Pittsburgh	Forbes Field; Pittsburgh, PA (rivalry)	L 0–11	18,000	
