= 1910 Cornell Big Red football team =

American college football season

1910 Cornell Big Red football
- Conference: Independent
- Record: 5–2–1
- Head coach: Daniel A. Reed (1st season)
- Captain: LeGrand Simson
- Home stadium: Percy Field

1910 Eastern college football independents records
	Conf.			Overall
Team	W	L	T	W		L		T
Pittsburgh		–		9	–	0	–	0
Harvard		–		9	–	0	–	1
Penn		–		9	–	1	–	1
Princeton		–		7	–	1	–	0
Trinity (CT)		–		7	–	1	–	0
Ursinus		–		6	–	1	–	0
Rhode Island State		–		5	–	1	–	1
Lafayette		–		7	–	2	–	0
Army		–		6	–	2	–	0
Brown		–		7	–	2	–	1
Yale		–		6	–	2	–	2
Dartmouth		–		5	–	2	–	0
Cornell		–		5	–	2	–	1
Penn State		–		5	–	2	–	1
Colgate		–		4	–	2	–	1
Swarthmore		–		5	–	3	–	0
Franklin & Marshall		–		4	–	3	–	2
Syracuse		–		5	–	4	–	1
Rutgers		–		3	–	2	–	3
Carlisle		–		8	–	6	–	0
Holy Cross		–		3	–	3	–	2
Temple		–		3	–	3	–	0
Washington & Jefferson		–		3	–	3	–	1
Wesleyan		–		4	–	4	–	1
New Hampshire		–		2	–	3	–	1
NYU		–		2	–	4	–	1
Geneva		–		2	–	5	–	2
Dickinson		–		3	–	7	–	0
Lehigh		–		2	–	6	–	1
Bucknell		–		2	–	6	–	0
Vermont		–		1	–	5	–	1
Carnegie Tech		–		1	–	6	–	1
Tufts		–		1	–	7	–	1
Boston College		–		0	–	4	–	2
Villanova		–		0	–	4	–	2

The 1910 Cornell Big Red football team was an American football team that represented Cornell University during the 1910 college football season. In their first season under head coach Daniel A. Reed, the Big Red compiled a 5–2–1 record and outscored all opponents by a combined total of 165 to 44. Two Cornell players received honors on the 1910 College Football All-America Team: end Harold Eyrich (Walter Camp–3); and tackle William Munk, Cornell (The Philadelphia Press-2).

== Schedule ==
Date	Opponent	Site	Result	Attendance	Source
October 1	Hobart	Percy Field; Ithaca, NY	W 50–0		
October 8	RPI	Percy Field; Ithaca, NY	W 24–0		
October 15	Oberlin	Percy Field; Ithaca, NY	T 0–0		
October 22	Vermont	Percy Field; Ithaca, NY	W 15–5		
October 29	St. Bonaventure	Percy Field; Ithaca, NY	W 47–0		
November 5	at Harvard	Harvard Stadium; Boston, MA	L 5–27	10,000	
November 12	Chicago	Percy Field; Ithaca, NY	W 18–0		
November 24	at Penn	Franklin Field; Philadelphia, PA (rivalry)	L 6–12		
