= 1910 Brown Bears football team =

American college football season

1910 Brown Bears football
- Conference: Independent
- Record: 7–2–1
- Head coach: Edward N. Robinson (9th season)
- Captain: J. R. McKay
- Home stadium: Andrews Field

1910 Eastern college football independents records
	Conf.			Overall
Team	W	L	T	W		L		T
Pittsburgh		–		9	–	0	–	0
Harvard		–		9	–	0	–	1
Penn		–		9	–	1	–	1
Princeton		–		7	–	1	–	0
Trinity (CT)		–		7	–	1	–	0
Ursinus		–		6	–	1	–	0
Rhode Island State		–		5	–	1	–	1
Lafayette		–		7	–	2	–	0
Army		–		6	–	2	–	0
Brown		–		7	–	2	–	1
Yale		–		6	–	2	–	2
Dartmouth		–		5	–	2	–	0
Cornell		–		5	–	2	–	1
Penn State		–		5	–	2	–	1
Colgate		–		4	–	2	–	1
Swarthmore		–		5	–	3	–	0
Franklin & Marshall		–		4	–	3	–	2
Syracuse		–		5	–	4	–	1
Rutgers		–		3	–	2	–	3
Carlisle		–		8	–	6	–	0
Holy Cross		–		3	–	3	–	2
Temple		–		3	–	3	–	0
Washington & Jefferson		–		3	–	3	–	1
Wesleyan		–		4	–	4	–	1
New Hampshire		–		2	–	3	–	1
NYU		–		2	–	4	–	1
Geneva		–		2	–	5	–	2
Dickinson		–		3	–	7	–	0
Lehigh		–		2	–	6	–	1
Bucknell		–		2	–	6	–	0
Vermont		–		1	–	5	–	1
Carnegie Tech		–		1	–	6	–	1
Tufts		–		1	–	7	–	1
Boston College		–		0	–	4	–	2
Villanova		–		0	–	4	–	2

The 1910 Brown Bears football team represented Brown University as an independent during the 1910 college football season. Led by ninth-year head coach Edward N. Robinson, Brown compiled a record of 7–2–1.

== Schedule ==
Date	Opponent	Site	Result	Attendance	Source
September 24	Norwich	Andrews Field; Providence, RI	W 31–0		
October 1	Rhode Island State	Andrews Field; Providence, RI (rivalry)	W 5–0		
October 8	Colgate	Andrews Field; Providence, RI	T 0–0		
October 15	Penn	Andrews Field; Providence, RI	L 0–20		
October 22	at Harvard	Harvard Stadium; Boston, MA	L 0–12		
October 29	Tufts	Andrews Field; Providence, RI	W 27–9		
November 5	at Yale	Yale Field; New Haven, CT	W 21–0		
November 12	Vermont	Andrews Field; Providence, RI	W 50–0		
November 19	Massachusetts	Andrews Field; Providence, RI	W 49–0		
November 24	Carlisle	Andrews Field; Providence, RI	W 15–6	10,000	
