= 1910 Carlisle Indians football team =

American college football season

1910 Carlisle Indians football
- Conference: Independent
- Record: 8–6
- Head coach: Pop Warner (9th season)
- Offensive scheme: Single-wing

1910 Eastern college football independents records
	Conf.			Overall
Team	W	L	T	W		L		T
Pittsburgh		–		9	–	0	–	0
Harvard		–		9	–	0	–	1
Penn		–		9	–	1	–	1
Princeton		–		7	–	1	–	0
Trinity (CT)		–		7	–	1	–	0
Ursinus		–		6	–	1	–	0
Rhode Island State		–		5	–	1	–	1
Lafayette		–		7	–	2	–	0
Army		–		6	–	2	–	0
Brown		–		7	–	2	–	1
Yale		–		6	–	2	–	2
Dartmouth		–		5	–	2	–	0
Cornell		–		5	–	2	–	1
Penn State		–		5	–	2	–	1
Colgate		–		4	–	2	–	1
Swarthmore		–		5	–	3	–	0
Franklin & Marshall		–		4	–	3	–	2
Syracuse		–		5	–	4	–	1
Rutgers		–		3	–	2	–	3
Carlisle		–		8	–	6	–	0
Holy Cross		–		3	–	3	–	2
Temple		–		3	–	3	–	0
Washington & Jefferson		–		3	–	3	–	1
Wesleyan		–		4	–	4	–	1
New Hampshire		–		2	–	3	–	1
NYU		–		2	–	4	–	1
Geneva		–		2	–	5	–	2
Dickinson		–		3	–	7	–	0
Lehigh		–		2	–	6	–	1
Bucknell		–		2	–	6	–	0
Vermont		–		1	–	5	–	1
Carnegie Tech		–		1	–	6	–	1
Tufts		–		1	–	7	–	1
Boston College		–		0	–	4	–	2
Villanova		–		0	–	4	–	2

The 1910 Carlisle Indians football team represented the Carlisle Indian Industrial School as an independent during the 1910 college football season. Led by ninth-year head coach Pop Warner, the Indians compiled a record of 8–6 and outscored opponents 235 to 69.

== Schedule ==
Date	Time	Opponent	Site	Result	Attendance	Source
September 21		Lebanon Valley	Indian Field; Carlisle, PA	W 53–0		
September 24	2:00 p.m.	vs. Villanova	Harrisburg Athletic Club grounds; Harrisburg, PA	W 6–0		
September 28		Muhlenberg	Indian Field; Carlisle, PA	W 39–0		
October 5		at Dickinson	Biddle Field; Carlisle, PA	W 24–0	1,500	
October 8	2:30 p.m.	vs. Bucknell	Driving Park; Wilkes-Barre, PA	W 39–0		
October 11		Gettysburg	Carlisle, PA	W 29–3		
October 15		at Syracuse	Archbold Stadium; Syracuse, NY	L 0–14	10,000	
October 22		at Princeton	University Field; Princeton, NJ	L 0–6		
October 29		at Penn	Franklin Field; Philadelphia, PA	L 5–17		
November 5	3:00 p.m.	vs. Virginia	American League Park; Washington, DC	W 22–5		
November 12		at Navy	Worden Field; Annapolis, MD	L 0–6		
November 16		at Harvard Law	Soldier's Field; Boston, MA	L 0–3	5,000	
November 19		at Johns Hopkins	Homewood Field; Baltimore, MD	W 12–0		
November 24		at Brown	Andrews Field; Providence, RI	L 6–15	10,000	

== See also ==
- 1910 College Football All-America Team
