= 1910 Swarthmore Quakers football team =

American college football season

1910 Swarthmore Quakers football
- Conference: Independent
- Record: 5–3
- Head coach: George H. Brooke (11th season)
- Captain: Tod Eberle
- Home stadium: Whittier Field

1910 Eastern college football independents records
	Conf.			Overall
Team	W	L	T	W		L		T
Pittsburgh		–		9	–	0	–	0
Harvard		–		9	–	0	–	1
Penn		–		9	–	1	–	1
Princeton		–		7	–	1	–	0
Trinity (CT)		–		7	–	1	–	0
Ursinus		–		6	–	1	–	0
Rhode Island State		–		5	–	1	–	1
Lafayette		–		7	–	2	–	0
Army		–		6	–	2	–	0
Brown		–		7	–	2	–	1
Yale		–		6	–	2	–	2
Dartmouth		–		5	–	2	–	0
Cornell		–		5	–	2	–	1
Penn State		–		5	–	2	–	1
Colgate		–		4	–	2	–	1
Swarthmore		–		5	–	3	–	0
Franklin & Marshall		–		4	–	3	–	2
Syracuse		–		5	–	4	–	1
Rutgers		–		3	–	2	–	3
Carlisle		–		8	–	6	–	0
Holy Cross		–		3	–	3	–	2
Temple		–		3	–	3	–	0
Washington & Jefferson		–		3	–	3	–	1
Wesleyan		–		4	–	4	–	1
New Hampshire		–		2	–	3	–	1
NYU		–		2	–	4	–	1
Geneva		–		2	–	5	–	2
Dickinson		–		3	–	7	–	0
Lehigh		–		2	–	6	–	1
Bucknell		–		2	–	6	–	0
Vermont		–		1	–	5	–	1
Carnegie Tech		–		1	–	6	–	1
Tufts		–		1	–	7	–	1
Boston College		–		0	–	4	–	2
Villanova		–		0	–	4	–	2

The 1910 Swarthmore Quakers football team was an American football team that represented Swarthmore College as an independent during the 1910 college football season. The team compiled a 5–3 record and outscored opponents by a total of 144 to 59. George H. Brooke was the head coach.

== Schedule ==
Date	Opponent	Site	Result	Source
October 1	Lebanon Valley	Whittier Field; Swarthmore, PA	W 47–0	
October 8	at Lafayette	March Field; Easton, PA	L 0–6	
October 15	at Rutgers	Neilson Field; New Brunswick, NJ	L 6–21	
October 22	Delaware	Whittier Field; Swarthmore, PA	W 27–0	
October 29	at Lehigh	Bethlehem, PA	W 15–8	
November 5	Ursinus	Whittier Field; Swarthmore, PA	L 0–6	
November 12	at Stevens	Hoboken, NJ	W 20–0	
November 19	Bucknell	Whittier Field; Swarthmore, NJ	W 23–18	
