= Fred Daly (American football) =

- Daley, circa 1910

Playing career
- 1909–1910: Yale
- Position: Halfback

Coaching career (HC unless noted)
- 1911–1915: Williams

Administrative career (AD unless noted)
- 1913–1916: Williams

Head coaching record
- Overall: 19–18–3

Accomplishments and honors

Championships
- National (1909)

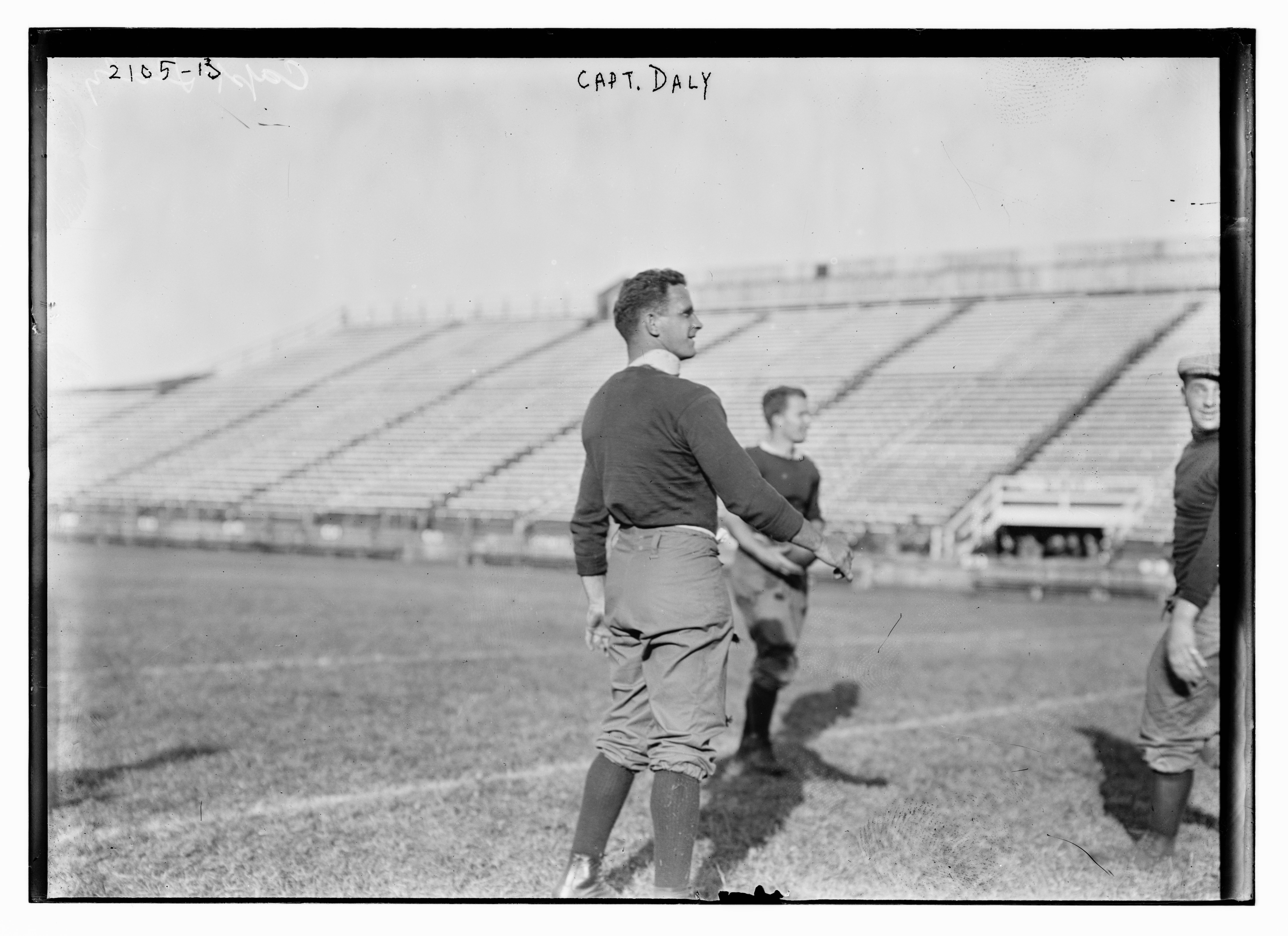
Daley during the 1910 Yale season

Frederick J. Daly was an American football and baseball player and coach. He played college football for Yale University in 1909 and 1910 and was selected as the captain of the 1910 Yale team. He was also the athletic director at Williams College from 1914 to 1916 and head coach of the Williams Ephs football team from 1911 to 1915, compiling a record of 19–18–3.

== Head coaching record ==
Year	Team	Overall	Conference	Standing	Bowl/playoffs
Williams Ephs (Independent) (1911–1915)
1911	Williams	3–4–1			
1912	Williams	6–2			
1913	Williams	3–4–1			
1914	Williams	6–1–1			
1915	Williams	1–7			
Williams:		19–18–3			
Total:		19–18–3			
