= Willard Gildersleeve =

American football player and coach (1886–1976)

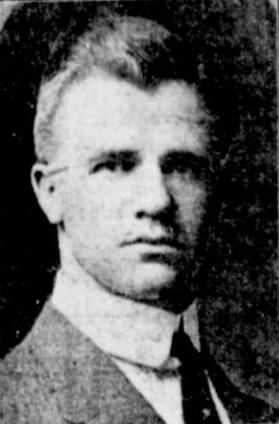
- Gildersleeve as Meriden H.S. coach in 1913

Biographical details
- Born: September 17, 1886; Gildersleeve, Connecticut, U.S.
- Died: July 19, 1976 (aged 89); Wayne, New Jersey, U.S.

Playing career
- c. 1905: Wesleyan

Coaching career (HC unless noted)
- 1909: New Hampshire
- 1910: Massachusetts
- 1911–1912: Westminster (PA)
- 1913–1916: Meriden HS (CT)
- 1917: Hyannis HS (MA)

Head coaching record
- Overall: 6–14–3 (college)

Willard Harvey Gildersleeve (September 17, 1886 – July 19, 1976) was an American college football coach. He served as the head coach at the New Hampshire College of Agriculture and the Mechanic Arts, (Note: The school would become the University of New Hampshire in 1923 and would adopt the Wildcats nickname in 1926.) Massachusetts Agricultural College, (Note: The school is now known as the University of Massachusetts Amherst.) and Westminster College.

== Early life and college ==
Gildersleeve was born on September 17, 1886, in Gildersleeve, Connecticut. He graduated from Middletown High School in 1903, and attended college at Wesleyan University, where he played baseball and football. The Meriden Daily Record called him a "star" athlete at Wesleyan. He graduated with a B.S. in 1908. He then undertook postgraduate studies at Harvard Summer School of physical training from 1909 to 1910. Gildersleeve served as the "physical director" at St. Lawrence University during that same time.

== Coaching career ==
Gildersleeve coached the 1909 New Hampshire football team and amassed a 3–4 record. He coached the 1910 Massachusetts Aggies (now known as the UMass Minutemen) and amassed a 1–6–2 record. He then coached Westminster in 1911 and amassed a 2–4–1 record. On October 7, 1911, he was arrested after a brawl erupted during the game against Pittsburgh. The Pittsburgh Gazette Times criticized the law enforcement response to the incident:

"The arrest of Gildersleeve appeared ridiculous, in that he was the only one of the crowd taken by the police. He is a small man and two big policemen grabbed him and took him across the field in full view of the crowd. The police acted as though Gildersleeve was a desperate criminal. This act failed to make a hit with the crowd, who were inclined to poke fun at the police for their brave act."

In 1913, Meriden High School hired Gildersleeve as a teacher and head football coach. He also coached baseball at the school. In 1917, he coached baseball at Hyannis High School, and in his one season tenure, guided the team to the Cape Cod High School Championship.

== Personal life ==
Gildersleeve married Gertrude Isabell née Sugden in 1909, and as of 1921, the couple had two children, a son and a daughter. He wrote extensively on genealogy, and in 1914, authored a book on his own family titled Gildersleeves of Gildersleeve, Conn. and the Descendants of Philip Gildersleeve. In the foreword he noted, "Ignorance of one's family is inexcusable and a source of future trouble. The family is the key of all progress, of all permanent success."

During the 1930s, he wrote to a number of distant Gildersleeve cousins to share his knowledge of their common ancestors, Richard Gildersleeve and his wife Joanna, pioneers who arrived at Boston in 1634 on a ship of the Winthrop line, and of their descendants. In 1941, he published Gildersleeve Pioneers, "a series of sketches and biographies, with an appendix of lineages", beginning with their pioneer ancestor, Richard Gildersleeve.

He died in July 1976 at the age of 89 in Wayne, New Jersey. He is interred at the Portland Burial Ground in Portland, Connecticut.

== Head coaching record ==
=== College ===
Year	Team	Overall	Conference	Standing	Bowl/playoffs
New Hampshire (Independent) (1909)
1909	New Hampshire	3–4			
New Hampshire:		3–4			
Massachusetts Aggies (Athletic League of New England State Colleges) (1910)
1910	Massachusetts	1–6–2			
Massachusetts:		1–6–2			
Westminster Titans (Western Pennsylvania and West Virginia Intercollegiate Athletic Association) (1911–1912)
1911	Westminster	2–4–1			
1912	Westminster	3–6	1–3	T–4th	
Westminster:		5–10–1			
Total:		9–20–1			
