= 1910 Princeton Tigers football team =

American college football season

1910 Princeton Tigers football
- Conference: Independent
- Record: 7–1
- Head coach: Bill Roper (4th season)
- Offensive scheme: Short punt
- Captain: Ed Hart
- Home stadium: University Field

1910 Eastern college football independents records
	Conf.			Overall
Team	W	L	T	W		L		T
Pittsburgh		–		9	–	0	–	0
Harvard		–		9	–	0	–	1
Penn		–		9	–	1	–	1
Princeton		–		7	–	1	–	0
Trinity (CT)		–		7	–	1	–	0
Ursinus		–		6	–	1	–	0
Rhode Island State		–		5	–	1	–	1
Lafayette		–		7	–	2	–	0
Army		–		6	–	2	–	0
Brown		–		7	–	2	–	1
Yale		–		6	–	2	–	2
Dartmouth		–		5	–	2	–	0
Cornell		–		5	–	2	–	1
Penn State		–		5	–	2	–	1
Colgate		–		4	–	2	–	1
Swarthmore		–		5	–	3	–	0
Franklin & Marshall		–		4	–	3	–	2
Syracuse		–		5	–	4	–	1
Rutgers		–		3	–	2	–	3
Carlisle		–		8	–	6	–	0
Holy Cross		–		3	–	3	–	2
Temple		–		3	–	3	–	0
Washington & Jefferson		–		3	–	3	–	1
Wesleyan		–		4	–	4	–	1
New Hampshire		–		2	–	3	–	1
NYU		–		2	–	4	–	1
Geneva		–		2	–	5	–	2
Dickinson		–		3	–	7	–	0
Lehigh		–		2	–	6	–	1
Bucknell		–		2	–	6	–	0
Vermont		–		1	–	5	–	1
Carnegie Tech		–		1	–	6	–	1
Tufts		–		1	–	7	–	1
Boston College		–		0	–	4	–	2
Villanova		–		0	–	4	–	2

The 1910 Princeton Tigers football team represented Princeton University in the 1910 college football season. The team finished with a 7–1 record under fourth-year head coach Bill Roper. The Tigers won their first seven games by a combined score of 98 to 0, but lost the final game of the season to rival Yale by a 5–3 score. Princeton halfback Talbot Pendleton was selected as a consensus first-team honoree on the 1910 College Football All-America Team, and one other player, a guard named Thomas A. Wilson, was selected as a first-team honoree by at least one selector.

== Schedule ==
Date	Opponent	Site	Result	Source
September 24	Stevens	University Field; Princeton, NJ	W 18–0	
October 1	Villanova	University Field; Princeton, NJ	W 36–0	
October 8	NYU	University Field; Princeton, NJ	W 12–0	
October 15	at Lafayette	Easton, PA	W 3–0	
October 22	Carlisle	University Field; Princeton, NJ	W 6–0	
October 29	vs. Dartmouth	Polo Grounds; New York, NY	W 6–0	
November 5	Holy Cross	University Field; Princeton, NJ	W 17–0	
November 12	Yale	University Field; Princeton, NJ (rivalry)	L 3–5	
