= 1910 Rutgers Queensmen football team =

American college football season

1910 Rutgers Queensmen football
- Conference: Independent
- Record: 3–2–3
- Head coach: Howard Gargan (1st season)
- Captain: Howard A. Smith
- Home stadium: Neilson Field

1910 Eastern college football independents records
	Conf.			Overall
Team	W	L	T	W		L		T
Pittsburgh		–		9	–	0	–	0
Harvard		–		9	–	0	–	1
Penn		–		9	–	1	–	1
Princeton		–		7	–	1	–	0
Trinity (CT)		–		7	–	1	–	0
Ursinus		–		6	–	1	–	0
Rhode Island State		–		5	–	1	–	1
Lafayette		–		7	–	2	–	0
Army		–		6	–	2	–	0
Brown		–		7	–	2	–	1
Yale		–		6	–	2	–	2
Dartmouth		–		5	–	2	–	0
Cornell		–		5	–	2	–	1
Penn State		–		5	–	2	–	1
Colgate		–		4	–	2	–	1
Swarthmore		–		5	–	3	–	0
Franklin & Marshall		–		4	–	3	–	2
Syracuse		–		5	–	4	–	1
Rutgers		–		3	–	2	–	3
Carlisle		–		8	–	6	–	0
Holy Cross		–		3	–	3	–	2
Temple		–		3	–	3	–	0
Washington & Jefferson		–		3	–	3	–	1
Wesleyan		–		4	–	4	–	1
New Hampshire		–		2	–	3	–	1
NYU		–		2	–	4	–	1
Geneva		–		2	–	5	–	2
Dickinson		–		3	–	7	–	0
Lehigh		–		2	–	6	–	1
Bucknell		–		2	–	6	–	0
Vermont		–		1	–	5	–	1
Carnegie Tech		–		1	–	6	–	1
Tufts		–		1	–	7	–	1
Boston College		–		0	–	4	–	2
Villanova		–		0	–	4	–	2

The 1910 Rutgers Queensmen football team represented Rutgers University as an independent during the 1910 college football season. In their first season under head coach Howard Gargan, the Queensmen compiled a 3–2–3 record and outscored their opponents, 59 to 33. The team captain was Howard A. Smith.

== Schedule ==
Date	Opponent	Site	Result	Source
October 1	Franklin & Marshall	Neilson Field; New Brunswick, NJ	T 0–0	
October 8	at Navy	Worden Field; Annapolis, MD	T 0–0	
October 15	Swarthmore	Neilson Field; New Brunswick, NJ	W 21–6	
October 22	at Haverford	Walton Field; Haverford, PA	T 0–0	
October 29	at NYU	Ohio Field; Bronx, NY	L 8–15	
November 8	St. Lawrence	Neilson Field; New Brunswick, NJ	W 17–0	
November 12	at Washington College	Chestertown, MD	L 5–6	
November 19	at Stevens	Castle Point grounds; Hoboken, NJ	W 8–6	
