= 1910 Trinity Bantams football team =

American college football season

1910 Trinity Bantams football
- Conference: Independent
- Record: 7–1
- Head coach: Raymond G. Gettell (3rd season)
- Captain: E. B. Ramsdell

1910 Eastern college football independents records
	Conf.			Overall
Team	W	L	T	W		L		T
Pittsburgh		–		9	–	0	–	0
Harvard		–		9	–	0	–	1
Penn		–		9	–	1	–	1
Princeton		–		7	–	1	–	0
Trinity (CT)		–		7	–	1	–	0
Ursinus		–		6	–	1	–	0
Rhode Island State		–		5	–	1	–	1
Lafayette		–		7	–	2	–	0
Army		–		6	–	2	–	0
Brown		–		7	–	2	–	1
Yale		–		6	–	2	–	2
Dartmouth		–		5	–	2	–	0
Cornell		–		5	–	2	–	1
Penn State		–		5	–	2	–	1
Colgate		–		4	–	2	–	1
Swarthmore		–		5	–	3	–	0
Franklin & Marshall		–		4	–	3	–	2
Syracuse		–		5	–	4	–	1
Rutgers		–		3	–	2	–	3
Carlisle		–		8	–	6	–	0
Holy Cross		–		3	–	3	–	2
Temple		–		3	–	3	–	0
Washington & Jefferson		–		3	–	3	–	1
Wesleyan		–		4	–	4	–	1
New Hampshire		–		2	–	3	–	1
NYU		–		2	–	4	–	1
Geneva		–		2	–	5	–	2
Dickinson		–		3	–	7	–	0
Lehigh		–		2	–	6	–	1
Bucknell		–		2	–	6	–	0
Vermont		–		1	–	5	–	1
Carnegie Tech		–		1	–	6	–	1
Tufts		–		1	–	7	–	1
Boston College		–		0	–	4	–	2
Villanova		–		0	–	4	–	2

The 1910 Trinity Bantams football team represented the Trinity College during the 1910 college football season. The team suffered its only loss to Army.

== Schedule ==
Date	Opponent	Site	Result
	Worcester Tech		W 21–0
	Mass. Aggies		W 15–3
October 15	Colgate		W 23–0
	Norwich		W 9–0
	Wesleyan		W 5–0
	NYU		W 12–6
	Haverford		W 37–0
November 19	Army		L 0–17
