= 1910 Lehigh Brown and White football team =

American college football season

1910 Lehigh Brown and White football
- Conference: Independent
- Record: 2–6–1
- Head coach: Howard R. Reiter (1st season)
- Home stadium: Lehigh Field

1910 Eastern college football independents records
	Conf.			Overall
Team	W	L	T	W		L		T
Pittsburgh		–		9	–	0	–	0
Harvard		–		9	–	0	–	1
Penn		–		9	–	1	–	1
Princeton		–		7	–	1	–	0
Trinity (CT)		–		7	–	1	–	0
Ursinus		–		6	–	1	–	0
Rhode Island State		–		5	–	1	–	1
Lafayette		–		7	–	2	–	0
Army		–		6	–	2	–	0
Brown		–		7	–	2	–	1
Yale		–		6	–	2	–	2
Dartmouth		–		5	–	2	–	0
Cornell		–		5	–	2	–	1
Penn State		–		5	–	2	–	1
Colgate		–		4	–	2	–	1
Swarthmore		–		5	–	3	–	0
Franklin & Marshall		–		4	–	3	–	2
Syracuse		–		5	–	4	–	1
Rutgers		–		3	–	2	–	3
Carlisle		–		8	–	6	–	0
Holy Cross		–		3	–	3	–	2
Temple		–		3	–	3	–	0
Washington & Jefferson		–		3	–	3	–	1
Wesleyan		–		4	–	4	–	1
New Hampshire		–		2	–	3	–	1
NYU		–		2	–	4	–	1
Geneva		–		2	–	5	–	2
Dickinson		–		3	–	7	–	0
Lehigh		–		2	–	6	–	1
Bucknell		–		2	–	6	–	0
Vermont		–		1	–	5	–	1
Carnegie Tech		–		1	–	6	–	1
Tufts		–		1	–	7	–	1
Boston College		–		0	–	4	–	2
Villanova		–		0	–	4	–	2

The 1910 Lehigh Brown and White football team was an American football team that represented Lehigh University as an independent during the 1910 college football season. In its first season under head coach Howard R. Reiter, the team compiled a 2–6–1 record and was outscored by a total of 98 to 46. Lehigh played home games at Lehigh Field in Bethlehem, Pennsylvania.

== Schedule ==
Date	Opponent	Site	Result	Source
September 28	Western Maryland	Lehigh Field; Bethlehem, PA	W 10–0	
October 8	at Stevens	Lehigh Field; Bethlehem, PA	T 0–0	
October 15	Haverford	Lehigh Field; Bethlehem, PA	L 0–5	
October 22	at Army	The Plain; West Point, NY	L 0–28	
October 29	Swarthmore	Lehigh Field; Bethlehem, PA	L 8–15	
November 5	at Navy	Worden Field; Annapolis, MD	L 0–30	
November 12	Carnegie Tech	Lehigh Field; Bethlehem, PA	W 25–0	
November 19	at Lafayette	March Field; Easton, PA (rivalry)	L 0–14	
November 24	at Georgetown	Georgetown Field; Washington, DC	L 3–6	
