= 1910 Carnegie Tech Tartans football team =

American college football season

1910 Carnegie Tech Tartans football
- Conference: Independent
- Record: 1–6–1
- Head coach: Winks Dowling (1st season)
- Home stadium: Tech Field

1910 Eastern college football independents records
	Conf.			Overall
Team	W	L	T	W		L		T
Pittsburgh		–		9	–	0	–	0
Harvard		–		9	–	0	–	1
Penn		–		9	–	1	–	1
Princeton		–		7	–	1	–	0
Trinity (CT)		–		7	–	1	–	0
Ursinus		–		6	–	1	–	0
Rhode Island State		–		5	–	1	–	1
Lafayette		–		7	–	2	–	0
Army		–		6	–	2	–	0
Brown		–		7	–	2	–	1
Yale		–		6	–	2	–	2
Dartmouth		–		5	–	2	–	0
Cornell		–		5	–	2	–	1
Penn State		–		5	–	2	–	1
Colgate		–		4	–	2	–	1
Swarthmore		–		5	–	3	–	0
Franklin & Marshall		–		4	–	3	–	2
Syracuse		–		5	–	4	–	1
Rutgers		–		3	–	2	–	3
Carlisle		–		8	–	6	–	0
Holy Cross		–		3	–	3	–	2
Temple		–		3	–	3	–	0
Washington & Jefferson		–		3	–	3	–	1
Wesleyan		–		4	–	4	–	1
New Hampshire		–		2	–	3	–	1
NYU		–		2	–	4	–	1
Geneva		–		2	–	5	–	2
Dickinson		–		3	–	7	–	0
Lehigh		–		2	–	6	–	1
Bucknell		–		2	–	6	–	0
Vermont		–		1	–	5	–	1
Carnegie Tech		–		1	–	6	–	1
Tufts		–		1	–	7	–	1
Boston College		–		0	–	4	–	2
Villanova		–		0	–	4	–	2

The 1910 Carnegie Tech Tartans football team represented the Carnegie Institute of Technology—now known as Carnegie Mellon University—as an independent during the 1910 college football season. Led by Winks Dowling in his first and only season as head coach, Carnegie Tech compiled a record of 3–7.

== Schedule ==
Date	Opponent	Site	Result	Source
October 1	Waynesburg	Pittsburgh, PA	T 0–0	
October 8	at Penn State	New Beaver Field; State College, PA	L 0–61	
October 15	at Grove City	Grove City, PA	L 3–16	
October 22	Geneva	Tech Field; Pittsburgh, PA	W 5–0	
October 29	at Washington & Jefferson	College Park; Washington, PA	L 0–8	
November 5	at Allegheny	Meadville, PA	L 0–27	
November 12	at Lehigh	Lehigh Field; Bethlehem, PA	L 0–25	
November 19	at Pittsburgh	Forbes Field; Pittsburgh, PA	L 0–35	
