= 1910 Bucknell football team =

American college football season

1910 Bucknell football
- Conference: Independent
- Record: 2–6
- Head coach: Byron W. Dickson (1st season)

1910 Eastern college football independents records
	Conf.			Overall
Team	W	L	T	W		L		T
Pittsburgh		–		9	–	0	–	0
Harvard		–		9	–	0	–	1
Penn		–		9	–	1	–	1
Princeton		–		7	–	1	–	0
Trinity (CT)		–		7	–	1	–	0
Ursinus		–		6	–	1	–	0
Rhode Island State		–		5	–	1	–	1
Lafayette		–		7	–	2	–	0
Army		–		6	–	2	–	0
Brown		–		7	–	2	–	1
Yale		–		6	–	2	–	2
Dartmouth		–		5	–	2	–	0
Cornell		–		5	–	2	–	1
Penn State		–		5	–	2	–	1
Colgate		–		4	–	2	–	1
Swarthmore		–		5	–	3	–	0
Franklin & Marshall		–		4	–	3	–	2
Syracuse		–		5	–	4	–	1
Rutgers		–		3	–	2	–	3
Carlisle		–		8	–	6	–	0
Holy Cross		–		3	–	3	–	2
Temple		–		3	–	3	–	0
Washington & Jefferson		–		3	–	3	–	1
Wesleyan		–		4	–	4	–	1
New Hampshire		–		2	–	3	–	1
NYU		–		2	–	4	–	1
Geneva		–		2	–	5	–	2
Dickinson		–		3	–	7	–	0
Lehigh		–		2	–	6	–	1
Bucknell		–		2	–	6	–	0
Vermont		–		1	–	5	–	1
Carnegie Tech		–		1	–	6	–	1
Tufts		–		1	–	7	–	1
Boston College		–		0	–	4	–	2
Villanova		–		0	–	4	–	2

The 1910 Bucknell football team was an American football team that represented Bucknell University as an independent during the 1910 college football season. In its first season under head coach Byron W. Dickson, the team compiled a 2–6 record.

== Schedule ==
Date	Time	Opponent	Site	Result	Attendance	Source
October 1		Lock Haven Normal	Lewisburg, PA	W 6–0		
October 8	2:30 p.m.	vs. Carlisle	Driving Park; Wilkes-Barre, PA	L 0–39		
October 15		at Dickinson	Carlisle, PA	L 6–9		
October 22		at West Virginia	Morgantown, WV	W 9–0		
October 29		at Lafayette	March Field; Easton, PA	L 0–12		
November 5		Gettysburg	Lewisburg, PA	L 6–9		
November 12		at Penn State	New Beaver Field; State College, PA	L 3–45		
November 19		at Swarthmore	Swarthmore, PA	L 18–23		
All times are in Eastern time
