= 1910 Vermont Green and Gold football team =

American college football season

1910 Vermont Green and Gold football
- Conference: Independent
- Record: 1–5–1
- Head coach: Edward Joseph Slavin (1st season)
- Home stadium: Centennial Field

1910 Eastern college football independents records
	Conf.			Overall
Team	W	L	T	W		L		T
Pittsburgh		–		9	–	0	–	0
Harvard		–		9	–	0	–	1
Penn		–		9	–	1	–	1
Princeton		–		7	–	1	–	0
Trinity (CT)		–		7	–	1	–	0
Ursinus		–		6	–	1	–	0
Rhode Island State		–		5	–	1	–	1
Lafayette		–		7	–	2	–	0
Army		–		6	–	2	–	0
Brown		–		7	–	2	–	1
Yale		–		6	–	2	–	2
Dartmouth		–		5	–	2	–	0
Cornell		–		5	–	2	–	1
Penn State		–		5	–	2	–	1
Colgate		–		4	–	2	–	1
Swarthmore		–		5	–	3	–	0
Franklin & Marshall		–		4	–	3	–	2
Syracuse		–		5	–	4	–	1
Rutgers		–		3	–	2	–	3
Carlisle		–		8	–	6	–	0
Holy Cross		–		3	–	3	–	2
Temple		–		3	–	3	–	0
Washington & Jefferson		–		3	–	3	–	1
Wesleyan		–		4	–	4	–	1
New Hampshire		–		2	–	3	–	1
NYU		–		2	–	4	–	1
Geneva		–		2	–	5	–	2
Dickinson		–		3	–	7	–	0
Lehigh		–		2	–	6	–	1
Bucknell		–		2	–	6	–	0
Vermont		–		1	–	5	–	1
Carnegie Tech		–		1	–	6	–	1
Tufts		–		1	–	7	–	1
Boston College		–		0	–	4	–	2
Villanova		–		0	–	4	–	2

The 1910 Vermont Green and Gold football team was an American football team that represented the University of Vermont as an independent during the 1910 college football season. In their first year under head coach Edward Joseph Slavin, the team compiled a 1–5–1 record.

== Schedule ==
Date	Opponent	Site	Result	Source
October 5	St. Lawrence	Centennial Field; Burlington, VT	W 6–0	
October 8	Maine	Centennial Field; Burlington, VT	T 0–0	
October 15	at Dartmouth	Alumni Oval; Hanover, NH	L 0–33	
October 22	at Cornell	Percy Field; Ithaca, NY	L 5–15	
October 29	vs. Norwich	Intercity Park; Montpelier, VT	L 0–17	
November 5	at Syracuse	Archbold Stadium; Syracuse, NY	L 0–3	
November 12	at Brown	Andrews Field; Providence, RI	L 0–50	
