= 1910 Villanova Wildcats football team =

American college football season

1910 Villanova Wildcats football
- Conference: Independent
- Record: 0–4–2
- Head coach: Fred Crolius (7th season)

1910 Eastern college football independents records
| | Conf. | | | Overall |
| Team | W | L | T | W | | L | | T |
|---|---|---|---|---|---|---|---|---|
| Pittsburgh | | – | | 9 | – | 0 | – | 0 |
| Harvard | | – | | 9 | – | 0 | – | 1 |
| Penn | | – | | 9 | – | 1 | – | 1 |
| Princeton | | – | | 7 | – | 1 | – | 0 |
| Trinity (CT) | | – | | 7 | – | 1 | – | 0 |
| Ursinus | | – | | 6 | – | 1 | – | 0 |
| Rhode Island State | | – | | 5 | – | 1 | – | 1 |
| Lafayette | | – | | 7 | – | 2 | – | 0 |
| Army | | – | | 6 | – | 2 | – | 0 |
| Brown | | – | | 7 | – | 2 | – | 1 |
| Yale | | – | | 6 | – | 2 | – | 2 |
| Dartmouth | | – | | 5 | – | 2 | – | 0 |
| Cornell | | – | | 5 | – | 2 | – | 1 |
| Penn State | | – | | 5 | – | 2 | – | 1 |
| Colgate | | – | | 4 | – | 2 | – | 1 |
| Swarthmore | | – | | 5 | – | 3 | – | 0 |
| Franklin & Marshall | | – | | 4 | – | 3 | – | 2 |
| Syracuse | | – | | 5 | – | 4 | – | 1 |
| Rutgers | | – | | 3 | – | 2 | – | 3 |
| Carlisle | | – | | 8 | – | 6 | – | 0 |
| Holy Cross | | – | | 3 | – | 3 | – | 2 |
| Temple | | – | | 3 | – | 3 | – | 0 |
| Washington & Jefferson | | – | | 3 | – | 3 | – | 1 |
| Wesleyan | | – | | 4 | – | 4 | – | 1 |
| New Hampshire | | – | | 2 | – | 3 | – | 1 |
| NYU | | – | | 2 | – | 4 | – | 1 |
| Geneva | | – | | 2 | – | 5 | – | 2 |
| Dickinson | | – | | 3 | – | 7 | – | 0 |
| Lehigh | | – | | 2 | – | 6 | – | 1 |
| Bucknell | | – | | 2 | – | 6 | – | 0 |
| Vermont | | – | | 1 | – | 5 | – | 1 |
| Carnegie Tech | | – | | 1 | – | 6 | – | 1 |
| Tufts | | – | | 1 | – | 7 | – | 1 |
| Boston College | | – | | 0 | – | 4 | – | 2 |
| Villanova | | – | | 0 | – | 4 | – | 2 |

The 1910 Villanova Wildcats football team represented Villanova University as an independent during the 1910 college football season. Led by seventh-year head coach Fred Crolius, Villanova compiled a record of 0–4–2. The 1910 campaign was the first of two consecutive winless seasons for Villanova.

== Schedule ==
| Date | Time | Opponent | Site | Result | Attendance | Source |
|---|---|---|---|---|---|---|
| September 24 | 2:00 p.m. | vs. Carlisle | Harrisburg Athletic Club grounds; Harrisburg, PA | L 0–6 | | |
| October 1 | | at Princeton | University Field; Princeton, NJ | L 0–36 | | |
| October 20 | | at North Carolina A&M | Riddick Stadium; Raleigh, NC | T 6–6 | 2,000 | |
| October 29 | | at Penn State | New Beaver Field; State College, PA | T 0–0 | | |
| November 12 | | at Army | The Plain; West Point, NY | L 0–13 | | |
| November 24 | | at Washington & Jefferson | Washington, PA | L 0–9 | | |
All times are in Eastern time
