= 1910 Dartmouth football team =

American college football season

1910 Dartmouth football
- Conference: Independent
- Record: 5–2
- Head coach: W. J. Randall (1st season)
- Captain: John J. Ryan

1910 Eastern college football independents records
| | Conf. | | | Overall |
| Team | W | L | T | W | | L | | T |
|---|---|---|---|---|---|---|---|---|
| Pittsburgh | | – | | 9 | – | 0 | – | 0 |
| Harvard | | – | | 9 | – | 0 | – | 1 |
| Penn | | – | | 9 | – | 1 | – | 1 |
| Princeton | | – | | 7 | – | 1 | – | 0 |
| Trinity (CT) | | – | | 7 | – | 1 | – | 0 |
| Ursinus | | – | | 6 | – | 1 | – | 0 |
| Rhode Island State | | – | | 5 | – | 1 | – | 1 |
| Lafayette | | – | | 7 | – | 2 | – | 0 |
| Army | | – | | 6 | – | 2 | – | 0 |
| Brown | | – | | 7 | – | 2 | – | 1 |
| Yale | | – | | 6 | – | 2 | – | 2 |
| Dartmouth | | – | | 5 | – | 2 | – | 0 |
| Cornell | | – | | 5 | – | 2 | – | 1 |
| Penn State | | – | | 5 | – | 2 | – | 1 |
| Colgate | | – | | 4 | – | 2 | – | 1 |
| Swarthmore | | – | | 5 | – | 3 | – | 0 |
| Franklin & Marshall | | – | | 4 | – | 3 | – | 2 |
| Syracuse | | – | | 5 | – | 4 | – | 1 |
| Rutgers | | – | | 3 | – | 2 | – | 3 |
| Carlisle | | – | | 8 | – | 6 | – | 0 |
| Holy Cross | | – | | 3 | – | 3 | – | 2 |
| Temple | | – | | 3 | – | 3 | – | 0 |
| Washington & Jefferson | | – | | 3 | – | 3 | – | 1 |
| Wesleyan | | – | | 4 | – | 4 | – | 1 |
| New Hampshire | | – | | 2 | – | 3 | – | 1 |
| NYU | | – | | 2 | – | 4 | – | 1 |
| Geneva | | – | | 2 | – | 5 | – | 2 |
| Dickinson | | – | | 3 | – | 7 | – | 0 |
| Lehigh | | – | | 2 | – | 6 | – | 1 |
| Bucknell | | – | | 2 | – | 6 | – | 0 |
| Vermont | | – | | 1 | – | 5 | – | 1 |
| Carnegie Tech | | – | | 1 | – | 6 | – | 1 |
| Tufts | | – | | 1 | – | 7 | – | 1 |
| Boston College | | – | | 0 | – | 4 | – | 2 |
| Villanova | | – | | 0 | – | 4 | – | 2 |

The 1910 Dartmouth football team was an American football team that represented Dartmouth College as an independent during the 1910 college football season. In its first and only season under head coach W. J. Randall, the team compiled a 5–2 record, shut out four of seven opponents, and outscored all opponents by a total of 81 to 27. John J. Ryan was the team captain.

== Schedule ==
| Date | Opponent | Site | Result | Source |
|---|---|---|---|---|
| October 1 | Massachusetts | Alumni Oval; Hanover, NH | W 6–0 | |
| October 8 | Colby | Alumni Oval; Hanover, NH | W 18–0 | |
| October 15 | Vermont | Alumni Oval; Hanover, NH | W 33–0 | |
| October 22 | at Williams | Williamstown, MA | W 9–0 | |
| October 29 | vs. Princeton | Polo Grounds; New York, NY | L 0–6 | |
| November 5 | Amherst | Alumni Oval; Hanover, NH | W 15–3 | |
| November 12 | at Harvard | Harvard Stadium; Boston, MA (rivalry) | L 0–18 | |
