= 1910 Syracuse Orangemen football team =

American college football season

1910 Syracuse Orangemen football
- Conference: Independent
- Record: 5–4–1
- Head coach: Tad Jones (2nd season)
- Captain: Harry Hartman
- Home stadium: Archbold Stadium

1910 Eastern college football independents records
	Conf.			Overall
Team	W	L	T	W		L		T
Pittsburgh		–		9	–	0	–	0
Harvard		–		9	–	0	–	1
Penn		–		9	–	1	–	1
Princeton		–		7	–	1	–	0
Trinity (CT)		–		7	–	1	–	0
Ursinus		–		6	–	1	–	0
Rhode Island State		–		5	–	1	–	1
Lafayette		–		7	–	2	–	0
Army		–		6	–	2	–	0
Brown		–		7	–	2	–	1
Yale		–		6	–	2	–	2
Dartmouth		–		5	–	2	–	0
Cornell		–		5	–	2	–	1
Penn State		–		5	–	2	–	1
Colgate		–		4	–	2	–	1
Swarthmore		–		5	–	3	–	0
Franklin & Marshall		–		4	–	3	–	2
Syracuse		–		5	–	4	–	1
Rutgers		–		3	–	2	–	3
Carlisle		–		8	–	6	–	0
Holy Cross		–		3	–	3	–	2
Temple		–		3	–	3	–	0
Washington & Jefferson		–		3	–	3	–	1
Wesleyan		–		4	–	4	–	1
New Hampshire		–		2	–	3	–	1
NYU		–		2	–	4	–	1
Geneva		–		2	–	5	–	2
Dickinson		–		3	–	7	–	0
Lehigh		–		2	–	6	–	1
Bucknell		–		2	–	6	–	0
Vermont		–		1	–	5	–	1
Carnegie Tech		–		1	–	6	–	1
Tufts		–		1	–	7	–	1
Boston College		–		0	–	4	–	2
Villanova		–		0	–	4	–	2

The 1910 Syracuse Orangemen football team represented Syracuse University as an independent during the 1910 college football season. Led by Tad Jones in his second and final season as head coach, the Orangemen compiled a record of 5–4–1. The team played home games at Archbold Stadium in Syracuse, New York.

== Schedule ==
Date	Time	Opponent	Site	Result	Attendance	Source
September 25		St. Bonaventure	Archbold Stadium; Syracuse, NY	T 0–0		
October 1		at Yale	Yale Field; New Haven, CT	L 6–12		
October 8		Rochester	Archbold Stadium; Syracuse, NY	W 6–0		
October 15		Carlisle	Archbold Stadium; Syracuse, NY	W 14–0	10,000	
October 22		at Hobart	Geneva, NY	W 12–5		
October 29		Michigan	Archbold Stadium; Syracuse, NY	L 0–11	11,000	
November 5		Vermont	Archbold Stadium; Syracuse, NY	W 3–0		
November 12		Colgate	Archbold Stadium; Syracuse, NY	L 6–11		
November 19		at Illinois	Illinois Field; Champaign, IL	L 0–3		
November 24	2:30 p.m.	at Saint Louis	Sportsman's Park; St. Louis, MO	W 6–0		
