= 1910 Army Cadets football team =

American college football season

1910 Army Cadets football
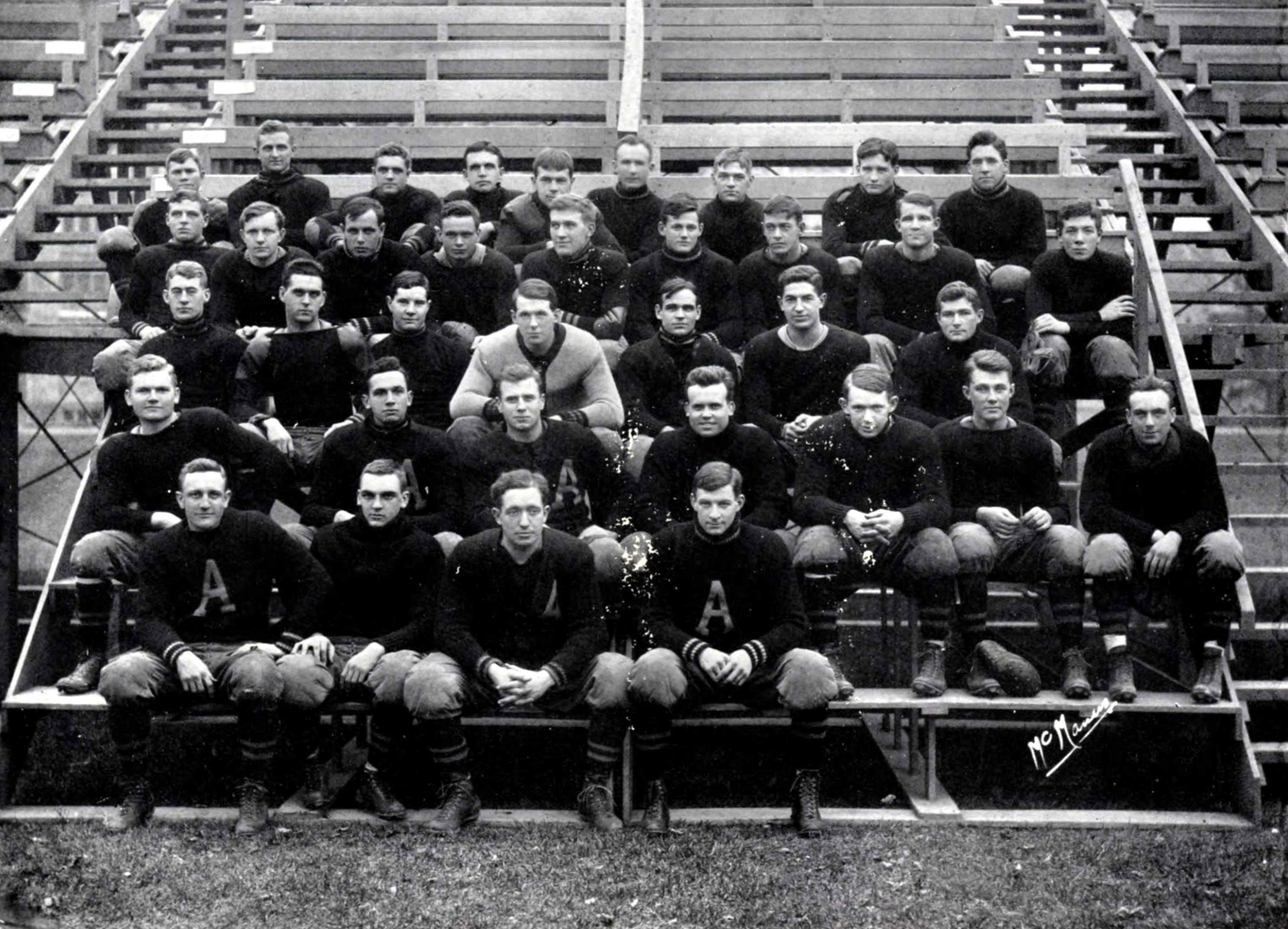
- Conference: Independent
- Record: 6–2
- Head coach: Harry Nelly (3rd season)
- Captain: Joseph Wier
- Home stadium: The Plain

1910 Eastern college football independents records
	Conf.			Overall
Team	W	L	T	W		L		T
Pittsburgh		–		9	–	0	–	0
Harvard		–		9	–	0	–	1
Penn		–		9	–	1	–	1
Princeton		–		7	–	1	–	0
Trinity (CT)		–		7	–	1	–	0
Ursinus		–		6	–	1	–	0
Rhode Island State		–		5	–	1	–	1
Lafayette		–		7	–	2	–	0
Army		–		6	–	2	–	0
Brown		–		7	–	2	–	1
Yale		–		6	–	2	–	2
Dartmouth		–		5	–	2	–	0
Cornell		–		5	–	2	–	1
Penn State		–		5	–	2	–	1
Colgate		–		4	–	2	–	1
Swarthmore		–		5	–	3	–	0
Franklin & Marshall		–		4	–	3	–	2
Syracuse		–		5	–	4	–	1
Rutgers		–		3	–	2	–	3
Carlisle		–		8	–	6	–	0
Holy Cross		–		3	–	3	–	2
Temple		–		3	–	3	–	0
Washington & Jefferson		–		3	–	3	–	1
Wesleyan		–		4	–	4	–	1
New Hampshire		–		2	–	3	–	1
NYU		–		2	–	4	–	1
Geneva		–		2	–	5	–	2
Dickinson		–		3	–	7	–	0
Lehigh		–		2	–	6	–	1
Bucknell		–		2	–	6	–	0
Vermont		–		1	–	5	–	1
Carnegie Tech		–		1	–	6	–	1
Tufts		–		1	–	7	–	1
Boston College		–		0	–	4	–	2
Villanova		–		0	–	4	–	2

The 1910 Army Cadets football team represented the United States Military Academy as an independent during the 1910 college football season. In their third and final season under head coach Harry Nelly, the Cadets compiled a 6–2 record, shut out five of their eight opponents, and outscored all opponents by a combined total of 96 to 12, an average of 12.0 points scored and 1.5 points allowed. The Cadets' two losses came against 1910 national champion Harvard by a 6 to 0 score and to the Navy Midshipmen by a 3 to 0 score in the annual Army–Navy Game.

Army's center Archibald Vincent Arnold was selected by sports writer, Wilton S. Farnsworth, of the New York Evening Journal as a first-team player on the All-America team. Arnold was also selected by The New York Times as a second-team All-American.

== Schedule ==
Date	Opponent	Site	Result	Source
October 8	Tufts	The Plain; West Point, NY	W 24–0	
October 15	Yale	The Plain; West Point, NY	W 9–3	
October 22	Lehigh	The Plain; West Point, NY	W 28–0	
October 29	Harvard	The Plain; West Point, NY	L 0–6	
November 5	Springfield Training School	The Plain; West Point, NY	W 5–0	
November 12	Villanova	The Plain; West Point, NY	W 13–0	
November 19	Trinity (CT)	The Plain; West Point, NY	W 17–0	
November 26	vs. Navy	Franklin Field; Philadelphia, PA (Army–Navy Game)	L 0–3	
