= 1910 Harvard Crimson football team =

American college football season

1910 Harvard Crimson football
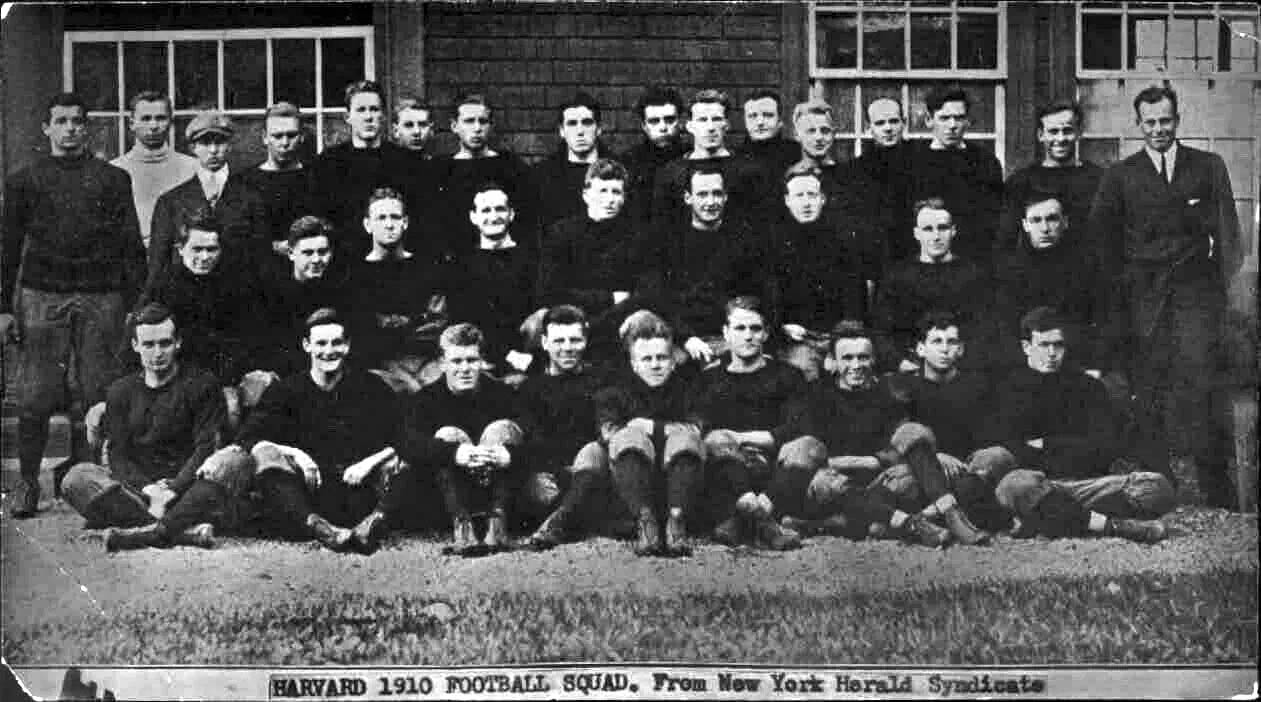

National champion
- Conference: Independent
- Record: 9–0–1
- Head coach: Percy Haughton (3rd season)
- Home stadium: Harvard Stadium

1910 Eastern college football independents records
	Conf.			Overall
Team	W	L	T	W		L		T
Pittsburgh		–		9	–	0	–	0
Harvard		–		9	–	0	–	1
Penn		–		9	–	1	–	1
Princeton		–		7	–	1	–	0
Trinity (CT)		–		7	–	1	–	0
Ursinus		–		6	–	1	–	0
Rhode Island State		–		5	–	1	–	1
Lafayette		–		7	–	2	–	0
Army		–		6	–	2	–	0
Brown		–		7	–	2	–	1
Yale		–		6	–	2	–	2
Dartmouth		–		5	–	2	–	0
Cornell		–		5	–	2	–	1
Penn State		–		5	–	2	–	1
Colgate		–		4	–	2	–	1
Swarthmore		–		5	–	3	–	0
Franklin & Marshall		–		4	–	3	–	2
Syracuse		–		5	–	4	–	1
Rutgers		–		3	–	2	–	3
Carlisle		–		8	–	6	–	0
Holy Cross		–		3	–	3	–	2
Temple		–		3	–	3	–	0
Washington & Jefferson		–		3	–	3	–	1
Wesleyan		–		4	–	4	–	1
New Hampshire		–		2	–	3	–	1
NYU		–		2	–	4	–	1
Geneva		–		2	–	5	–	2
Dickinson		–		3	–	7	–	0
Lehigh		–		2	–	6	–	1
Bucknell		–		2	–	6	–	0
Vermont		–		1	–	5	–	1
Carnegie Tech		–		1	–	6	–	1
Tufts		–		1	–	7	–	1
Boston College		–		0	–	4	–	2
Villanova		–		0	–	4	–	2

The 1910 Harvard Crimson football team was an American football team that represented Harvard University as an independent during the 1910 college football season. In its third year under head coach Percy Haughton, the Crimson compiled an 8–0–1 record, shut out seven of eight opponents, and outscored all opponents by a total of 155 to 5.

There was no contemporaneous system in 1910 for determining a national champion. However, Harvard was retroactively named as the national champion by the Billingsley Report, Helms Athletic Foundation, and Houlgate System, and as a co-national champion by the National Championship Foundation.

Three Harvard players were consensus first-team selections on the 1910 All-American football team: halfback Percy Wendell, guard Bob Fisher, and tackle Robert McKay. Other notable players included fullback/halfback Hamilton Corbett (chosen as All-American by Wilton S. Farnsworth of the New York Evening Journal), ends Lawrence Dunlap Smith and Richard Plimpton Lewis, tackle Lothrop "Ted" Withington, and guard Wayland Minot (chosen as first-team All-American by The New York Times).

== Schedule ==
Date	Time	Opponent	Site	Result	Attendance	Source
September 28	3:30 p.m.	Bates	Harvard Stadium; Boston, MA	W 22–0	4,000	
October 1	3:00 p.m.	Bowdoin	Harvard Stadium; Boston, MA	W 32–0		
October 8	3:00 p.m.	Williams	Harvard Stadium; Boston, MA	W 21–0	> 10,000	
October 15	3:00 p.m.	Amherst	Harvard Stadium; Boston, MA	W 17–0		
October 19		All-Stars	Harvard Stadium; Boston, MA	W 6–0	3,000	
October 22		Brown	Harvard Stadium; Boston, MA	W 12–0		
October 29		at Army	The Plain; West Point, NY	W 6–0		
November 5		Cornell	Harvard Stadium; Boston, MA	W 27–5	10,000	
November 12		Dartmouth	Harvard Stadium; Boston, MA (rivalry)	W 18–0		
November 19		at Yale	Yale Field; New Haven, CT (rivalry)	T 0–0	33,000	

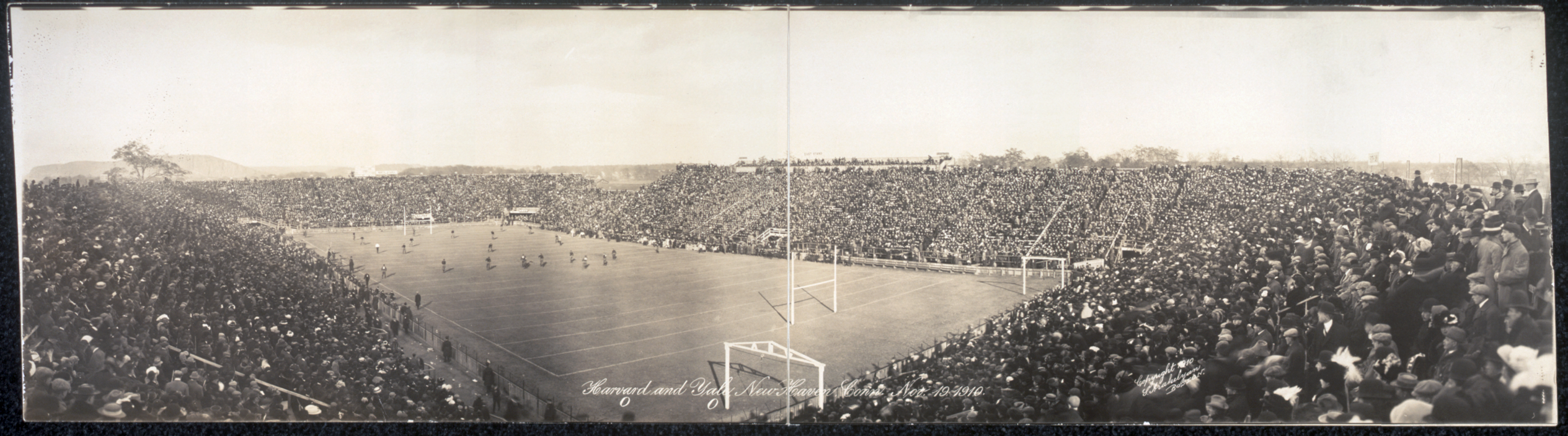
Harvard tied Yale, 0-0.

== Roster ==
- Amory, C
- Blodgett, G
- Bush, T
- Thomas J. Campbell, HB
- Hamilton Corbett, HB
- Sam Felton, T
- Bob Fisher, G
- T. Frothingham, HB
- Gardner, QB
- Graustein, HB
- Hann, T
- Hollister, E
- Huntington, G
- Johnson, QB
- Jowett, E
- F. Leslie, T
- H. Leslie, FB
- Richard Plimpton Lewis, E
- Long, E
- Robert McKay, T
- Wayland Minot, G
- Morrison, HB
- O'Flaherty, E
- Derrick Parmenter, G
- Perkins, C
- Pierce, HB
- Potter, QB
- Lawrence Dunlap Smith, E
- P. Smith, C
- Stow, G
- Tryon, FB
- Percy Wendell, HB
- Richard B. Wigglesworth, QB
- Lothrop Withington, T
