= 1910 Penn Quakers football team =

American college football season

1910 Penn Quakers football
- Conference: Independent
- Record: 9–1–1
- Head coach: Andy Smith (2nd season)
- Captain: Ernest Cozens
- Home stadium: Franklin Field

1910 Eastern college football independents records
	Conf.			Overall
Team	W	L	T	W		L		T
Pittsburgh		–		9	–	0	–	0
Harvard		–		9	–	0	–	1
Penn		–		9	–	1	–	1
Princeton		–		7	–	1	–	0
Trinity (CT)		–		7	–	1	–	0
Ursinus		–		6	–	1	–	0
Rhode Island State		–		5	–	1	–	1
Lafayette		–		7	–	2	–	0
Army		–		6	–	2	–	0
Brown		–		7	–	2	–	1
Yale		–		6	–	2	–	2
Dartmouth		–		5	–	2	–	0
Cornell		–		5	–	2	–	1
Penn State		–		5	–	2	–	1
Colgate		–		4	–	2	–	1
Swarthmore		–		5	–	3	–	0
Franklin & Marshall		–		4	–	3	–	2
Syracuse		–		5	–	4	–	1
Rutgers		–		3	–	2	–	3
Carlisle		–		8	–	6	–	0
Holy Cross		–		3	–	3	–	2
Temple		–		3	–	3	–	0
Washington & Jefferson		–		3	–	3	–	1
Wesleyan		–		4	–	4	–	1
New Hampshire		–		2	–	3	–	1
NYU		–		2	–	4	–	1
Geneva		–		2	–	5	–	2
Dickinson		–		3	–	7	–	0
Lehigh		–		2	–	6	–	1
Bucknell		–		2	–	6	–	0
Vermont		–		1	–	5	–	1
Carnegie Tech		–		1	–	6	–	1
Tufts		–		1	–	7	–	1
Boston College		–		0	–	4	–	2
Villanova		–		0	–	4	–	2

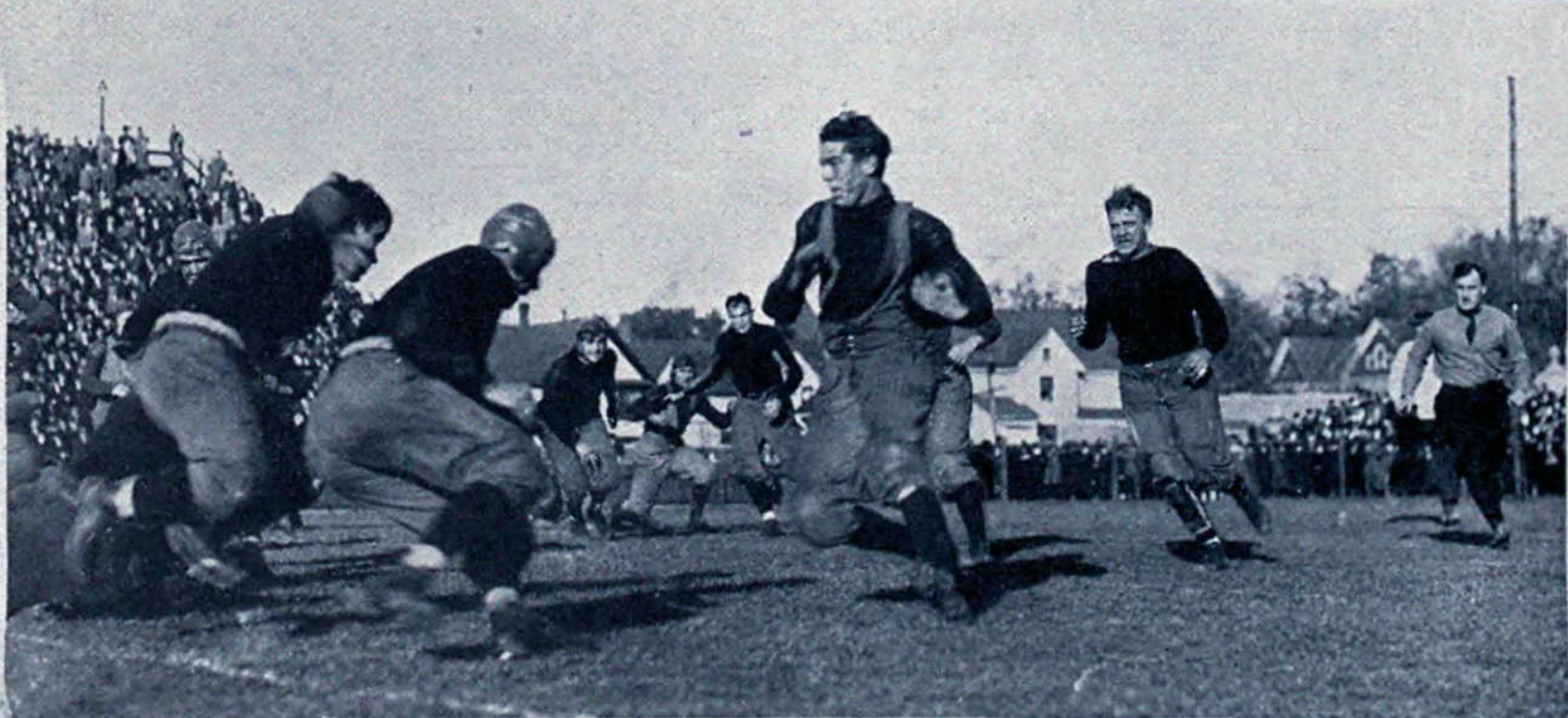
A running play during the Michigan-Penn football game played in Philadelphia on November 12, 1910

The 1910 Penn Quakers football team represented the University of Pennsylvania as an independent during the 1910 college football season. Led by second-year head coach Andy Smith, the Quakers compiled a record of 9–1–1. Penn played home games at Franklin Field in Philadelphia.

== Schedule ==
Date	Opponent	Site	Result	Source
September 27	Ursinus	Franklin Field; Philadelphia, PA	L 5–8	
September 28	Dickinson	Franklin Field; Philadelphia, PA	W 18–0	
October 1	Gettysburg	Franklin Field; Philadelphia, PA	W 29–0	
October 5	Franklin & Marshall	Franklin Field; Philadelphia, PA	W 17–0	
October 8	West Virginia	Franklin Field; Philadelphia, PA	W 38–0	
October 15	at Brown	Providence, RI	W 20–0	
October 22	Penn State	Franklin Field; Philadelphia, PA	W 10–0	
October 29	Carlisle	Franklin Field; Philadelphia, PA	W 17–5	
October 21	Lafayette	Franklin Field; Philadelphia, PA	W 18–0	
November 12	Michigan	Franklin Field; Philadelphia, PA	T 0–0	
November 24	Cornell	Franklin Field; Philadelphia, PA (rivalry)	W 12–6	
