= 1910 college football season =

American college football season

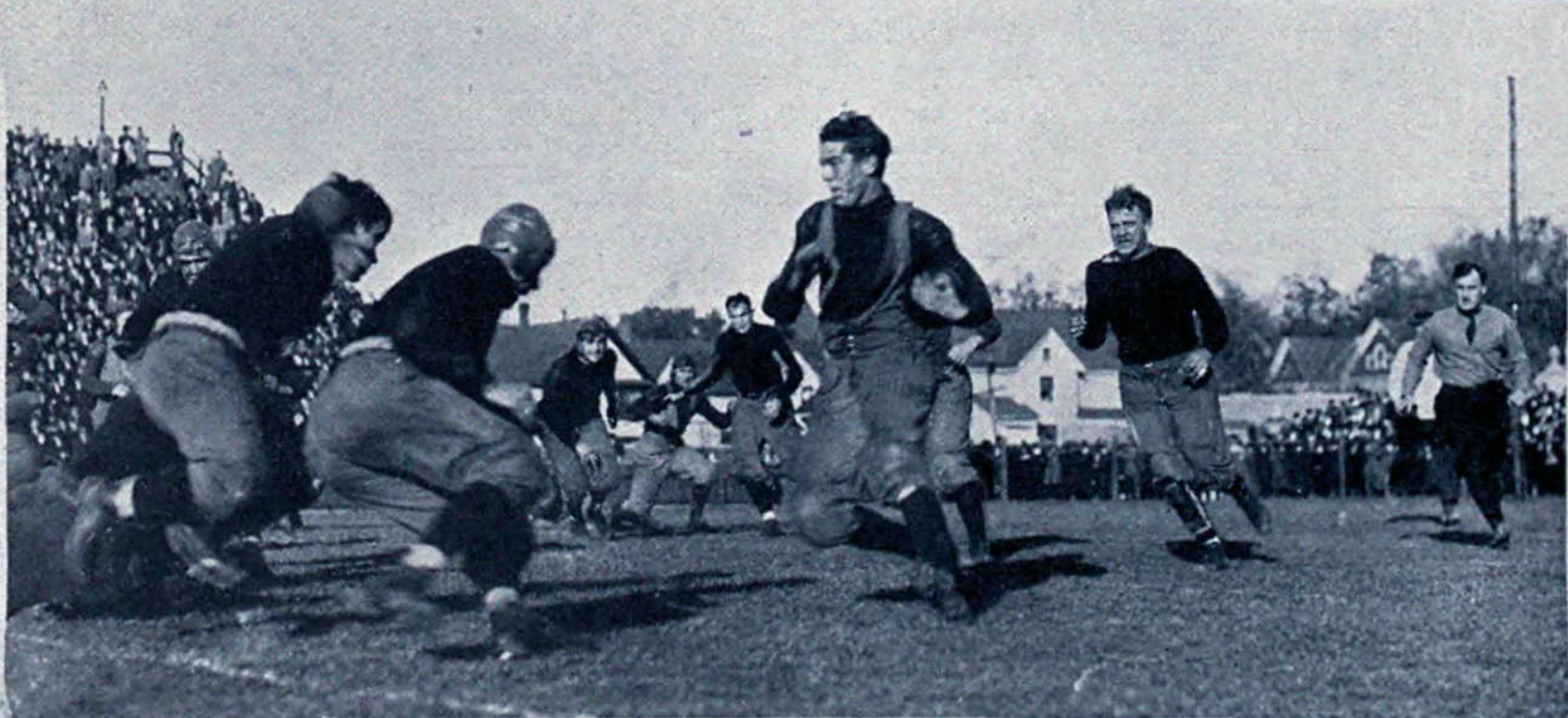
- Michigan vs. Penn
- Champion: Harvard

The 1910 college football season had no clear-cut champion, with the Official NCAA Division I Football Records Book listing Harvard and Pittsburgh as having been retrospectively selected national champions, by four "major selectors" in about 1927, 1947, 1980 and 2003. Harvard claims a national championship for the 1910 season. Auburn also claims a national title based on a selection in Richard Billingsley's unrevised original math system.

== Rules ==
Cartoon by Ryan Walker on the ongoing attempt to make a brutal sport more effete through rules changes.

Rule changes were made prior to the 1910 season to permit more use of the forward pass, with complicated limitations:

- The only eligible receivers were the two ends, who could catch a pass no more than 20 yards beyond the line of scrimmage, and could not be interfered with until the ball was caught.
- A legal pass could not be thrown unless the quarterback was at least 5 yards behind the line of scrimmage and the rest of the players, except the two ends, were at least 1 yard behind the scrimmage line.
- On kickoffs and punts, the kicking team's players could not be touched until they had advanced 20 yards
- Flying tackles were outlawed, and "the man making a tackle must have at least one foot on the ground".
- The ballcarrier could no longer be aided in any way by his teammates.
- Games were now played as four quarters, each 15 minutes long, rather than two halves of 35 minutes each

Other rules in 1910 were:

- Field 110 yards in length
- Kickoff made from midfield
- Three downs to gain ten yards
- Touchdown worth 5 points
- Field goal worth 3 points

The season ran from September 24 until Thanksgiving Day (November 24). Prior to Thanksgiving, the season's death toll was 22; the previous season's was 30.

== Conference and program changes ==
- The Colorado Faculty Athletic Conference (CFAC) changed its name to the Rocky Mountain Faculty Athletic Conference (RMFAC, now just the Rocky Mountain Athletic Conference) in 1910 after expanding into Utah.

=== Conference changes ===
School	1909 Conference	1910 Conference
The Citadel Bulldogs	Independent	SIAA
Denver Pioneers	Independent	Rocky Mountain
Howard Bulldogs	Independent	SIAA
Indiana State Normal Fightin' Teachers	Independent	Dropped Program
Louisville Cardinals	Program Established	Independent
Utah Utes	Independent	Rocky Mountain

=== Program changes ===
- Arkansas changed its nickname from the Cardinals to the current Razorbacks.

== Conference standings ==
=== Major conference standings ===
1910 Missouri Valley Conference football standings
	Conf.					Overall
Team	W		L		T	W		L		T
Nebraska $	2	–	0	–	0	7	–	1	–	0
Iowa	3	–	1	–	0	5	–	2	–	0
Missouri	2	–	1	–	1	4	–	2	–	2
Iowa State	2	–	2	–	0	4	–	4	–	0
Kansas	1	–	1	–	1	6	–	1	–	1
Washington University	0	–	2	–	0	3	–	4	–	0
Drake	0	–	3	–	0	3	–	5	–	0
$ – Conference champion

1910 Northwest Conference football standings
	Conf.					Overall
Team	W		L		T	W		L		T
Washington $	4	–	0	–	0	6	–	0	–	0
Oregon	2	–	0	–	0	4	–	1	–	0
Oregon Agricultural	2	–	2	–	0	3	–	2	–	1
Idaho	2	–	2	–	0	4	–	2	–	0
Washington State	1	–	3	–	0	2	–	3	–	0
Whitman	0	–	4	–	0	2	–	4	–	0
$ – Conference champion

1910 Rocky Mountain Conference football standings
	Conf.					Overall
Team	W		L		T	W		L		T
Colorado College +	4	–	0	–	0	7	–	0	–	0
Colorado +	3	–	0	–	0	6	–	0	–	0
Utah	2	–	2	–	0	4	–	2	–	0
Denver	2	–	2	–	0	4	–	3	–	1
Colorado Mines	1	–	4	–	0	2	–	4	–	0
Colorado Agricultural	0	–	4	–	0	0	–	5	–	0
+ – Conference co-champions

1910 Southern Intercollegiate Athletic Association football standings
	Conf.					Overall
Team	W		L		T	W		L		T
Vanderbilt +	5	–	0	–	0	8	–	0	–	1
Auburn +	5	–	0	–	0	6	–	1	–	0
Sewanee	3	–	1	–	0	8	–	2	–	0
Georgia	4	–	2	–	1	6	–	2	–	1
Ole Miss	2	–	1	–	0	7	–	1	–	0
Mississippi A&M	3	–	2	–	0	7	–	2	–	0
Mercer	3	–	2	–	0	6	–	3	–	0
Georgia Tech	3	–	3	–	0	5	–	3	–	0
Clemson	2	–	3	–	1	4	–	3	–	1
LSU	1	–	3	–	0	1	–	5	–	0
Tennessee	1	–	4	–	0	3	–	5	–	1
The Citadel	0	–	2	–	0	3	–	4	–	0
Alabama	0	–	4	–	0	4	–	4	–	0
Howard (AL)	0	–	5	–	0	1	–	8	–	0
+ – Conference co-champions

1910 Western Conference football standings
	Conf.					Overall
Team	W		L		T	W		L		T
Illinois +	4	–	0	–	0	7	–	0	–	0
Minnesota +	2	–	0	–	0	6	–	1	–	0
Indiana	3	–	1	–	0	5	–	1	–	0
Iowa	1	–	1	–	0	5	–	2	–	0
Wisconsin	1	–	2	–	1	1	–	2	–	2
Northwestern	1	–	2	–	1	1	–	3	–	1
Chicago	2	–	4	–	0	2	–	5	–	0
Purdue	0	–	4	–	0	1	–	5	–	0
+ – Conference co-champions

=== Independents ===
1910 Eastern college football independents records
	Conf.			Overall
Team	W	L	T	W		L		T
Pittsburgh		–		9	–	0	–	0
Harvard		–		9	–	0	–	1
Penn		–		9	–	1	–	1
Princeton		–		7	–	1	–	0
Trinity (CT)		–		7	–	1	–	0
Ursinus		–		6	–	1	–	0
Rhode Island State		–		5	–	1	–	1
Lafayette		–		7	–	2	–	0
Army		–		6	–	2	–	0
Brown		–		7	–	2	–	1
Yale		–		6	–	2	–	2
Dartmouth		–		5	–	2	–	0
Cornell		–		5	–	2	–	1
Penn State		–		5	–	2	–	1
Colgate		–		4	–	2	–	1
Swarthmore		–		5	–	3	–	0
Franklin & Marshall		–		4	–	3	–	2
Syracuse		–		5	–	4	–	1
Rutgers		–		3	–	2	–	3
Carlisle		–		8	–	6	–	0
Holy Cross		–		3	–	3	–	2
Temple		–		3	–	3	–	0
Washington & Jefferson		–		3	–	3	–	1
Wesleyan		–		4	–	4	–	1
New Hampshire		–		2	–	3	–	1
NYU		–		2	–	4	–	1
Geneva		–		2	–	5	–	2
Dickinson		–		3	–	7	–	0
Lehigh		–		2	–	6	–	1
Bucknell		–		2	–	6	–	0
Vermont		–		1	–	5	–	1
Carnegie Tech		–		1	–	6	–	1
Tufts		–		1	–	7	–	1
Boston College		–		0	–	4	–	2
Villanova		–		0	–	4	–	2

1910 Midwestern college football independents records
	Conf.			Overall
Team	W	L	T	W		L		T
Wabash		–		4	–	0	–	0
Michigan Agricultural		–		6	–	1	–	0
St. Mary's (OH)		–		5	–	1	–	0
Central Michigan		–		5	–	1	–	1
Marquette		–		6	–	1	–	2
Notre Dame		–		4	–	1	–	1
Buchtel		–		7	–	2	–	0
Saint Louis		–		7	–	2	–	0
Michigan		–		3	–	0	–	3
Fairmount		–		6	–	2	–	1
Lake Forest		–		5	–	2	–	0
Western State Normal		–		4	–	2	–	0
Northern Illinois State		–		4	–	2	–	1
Mount Union		–		4	–	2	–	2
South Dakota State		–		4	–	2	–	2
Detroit College		–		3	–	2	–	0
Doane		–		3	–	2	–	1
Butler		–		4	–	3	–	1
Rose Poly		–		4	–	4	–	0
North Dakota Agricultural		–		2	–	3	–	0
Miami (OH)		–		2	–	4	–	1
Carthage		–		2	–	4	–	0
Ohio Northern		–		2	–	5	–	0
Iowa State Teachers		–		1	–	4	–	1
Haskell		–		2	–	7	–	0
Heidelberg		–		1	–	7	–	0
Michigan State Normal		–		0	–	5	–	1
Ohio		–		0	–	6	–	1

1910 Southern college football independents records
	Conf.			Overall
Team	W	L	T	W		L		T
Central University		–		9	–	0	–	0
Louisiana Industrial		–		7	–	0	–	0
Stetson		–		3	–	0	–	0
Navy		–		8	–	0	–	1
North Carolina A&M		–		4	–	0	–	2
Spring Hill		–		3	–	0	–	1
Texas A&M		–		8	–	1	–	0
Arkansas		–		7	–	1	–	0
Florida		–		6	–	1	–	0
Baylor		–		6	–	1	–	1
Georgetown		–		6	–	1	–	1
Marshall		–		5	–	1	–	1
Kentucky State		–		7	–	2	–	0
Texas		–		6	–	2	–	0
Virginia		–		6	–	2	–	0
Southwestern Louisiana Industrial		–		6	–	2	–	1
Chattanooga		–		5	–	2	–	1
Kendall		–		2	–	1	–	1
Maryland		–		4	–	3	–	1
Oklahoma		–		4	–	2	–	1
Washington and Lee		–		4	–	3	–	0
South Carolina		–		4	–	4	–	0
Birmingham		–		3	–	3	–	1
VMI		–		3	–	3	–	1
Davidson		–		3	–	4	–	2
Oklahoma A&M		–		3	–	4	–	0
West Virginia		–		2	–	4	–	1
Catholic University		–		2	–	4	–	0
North Carolina		–		3	–	6	–	0
George Washington		–		2	–	2	–	2
Wake Forest		–		2	–	7	–	0
Delaware		–		1	–	2	–	2
Mississippi College		–		0	–	4	–	0
Southwest Texas State		–		0	–	4	–	0
Tulane		–		0	–	7	–	0

1910 Western college football independents records
	Conf.			Overall
Team	W	L	T	W		L		T
Washington		–		6	–	0	–	0
USC		–		7	–	0	–	1
Oregon		–		4	–	1	–	0
Utah Agricultural		–		5	–	2	–	0
Hawaii		–		4	–	2	–	0
Idaho		–		4	–	2	–	0
Montana		–		3	–	2	–	1
Oregon Agricultural		–		3	–	2	–	1
New Mexico A&M		–		3	–	2	–	0
Wyoming		–		4	–	4	–	0
Washington State		–		2	–	3	–	0
New Mexico		–		0	–	3	–	0

=== Minor conferences ===
Conference	Champion(s)	Record
Kansas Collegiate Athletic Conference	Kansas State Agricultural	4–0
Michigan Intercollegiate Athletic Association	Alma	1–0
Ohio Athletic Conference	Oberlin	3–0–1

=== Minor conference standings ===
1910 Eastern Virginia Intercollegiate Athletic Association football standings
	Conf.					Overall
Team	W		L		T	W		L		T
Randolph–Macon $	3	–	0	–	0	4	–	4	–	0
Hampden–Sydney	2	–	1	–	0	4	–	3	–	0
William & Mary	1	–	2	–	0	1	–	7	–	1
Richmond	0	–	3	–	0	1	–	6	–	1
$ – Conference champion

1910 Illinois Intercollegiate Athletic Conference football standings
	Conf.					Overall
Team	W		L		T	W		L		T
Southern Illinois		–		–		7	–	1	–	0

1910 Missouri Valley Conference for Black Schools football standings
	Conf.					Overall
Team	W		L		T	W		L		T
Lincoln (MO) $	1	–	0	–	0	2	–	0	–	0
Western University	1	–	2	–	0	2	–	2	–	0
Lawrence Athletics	1	–	1	–	0	1	–	1	–	0
George R. Smith			–			0	–	0	–	0
Topeka Industrial Institute			–			0	–	0	–	0
$ – Conference champion

1910 Ohio Athletic Conference football standings
	Conf.					Overall
Team	W		L		T	W		L		T
Oberlin $	3	–	0	–	1	5	–	1	–	2
Case	5	–	1	–	0	6	–	1	–	1
Ohio State	5	–	1	–	2	5	–	1	–	3
Cincinnati	3	–	1	–	0	5	–	3	–	0
Western Reserve	4	–	3	–	0	5	–	4	–	0
Ohio Wesleyan	3	–	3	–	0	6	–	3	–	0
Miami (OH)	1	–	1	–	0	2	–	4	–	1
Denison	3	–	4	–	2	3	–	4	–	2
Wooster	1	–	4	–	1	1	–	6	–	1
Kenyon	1	–	5	–	0	1	–	6	–	1
Wittenberg	0	–	5	–	0	2	–	7	–	0
Ohio	0	–	1	–	0	0	–	6	–	1
$ – Conference champion

== Awards and honors ==
=== All-Americans ===
The consensus All-America team included Walter Camp's selections:

Position	Name	Height	Weight (lbs.)	Class	Hometown	Team
QB	Earl Sprackling	5'9"	150	Jr.	Cleveland, Ohio	Brown
HB	Percy Wendell			So.	Roxbury, Massachusetts	Harvard
HB	Talbot Pendleton					Princeton
FB	Leroy Mercer			So.		Penn
E	Stanfield Wells			Jr.	Massillon, Ohio	Michigan
T	Robert McKay			Sr.		Harvard
G	Albert Benbrook		240	Sr.	Chicago, Illinois	Michigan
C	Ernest Cozens			Sr.		Penn
G	Bob Fisher			Jr.	Boston, Massachusetts	Harvard
T	James Walker					Minnesota
E	John Kilpatrick					Yale
