= Crook (surname) =

Other names
- See also: Crooke

Crook is surname. Notable people with the name include:

== Surname ==
- A. R. Crook (1864–1930), American geologist
- Al Crook (Alfred John Crook; 1897–1958), American football player
- Alan Crook (1897–1965), Australian electrical engineer
- Andrew Crook (born 1980), Australian cricketer
- Anna Crook (born 1934), American politician, member of the New Mexico House of Representatives (1995–2015)
- Billy Crook (disambiguation)
- Carl Crook (born 1963), English amateur lightweight and professional light/light welterweight boxer
- Catherine Crook de Camp (1907–2000), American science fiction author
- Charles Crook (1862–1926), English teacher, trade union official and politician, Member of Parliament (1922–1923, 1924–1926)
- Clive Crook (born 1953), English columnist, editor and author
- Eddie Crook Jr. (1929–2005), American boxer
- David Crook (1910–2000), British Marxist
- David Moore Crook (1914–1944), British fighter pilot
- Elizabeth Crook (born 1959), American novelist
- Frances Crook (born 1952), British Labour Party politician
- General Crook or General Columbus Crook (born 1945), American blues musician
- Geoffrey Crook (born 1978), English cricketer
- George Crook (1828–1890), American general
- George Crook (rugby union) (born 1988), English rugby union player
- Gordon Crook (1921–2011), New Zealand visual artist
- Hal Crook (born 1950), jazz trombonist
- Helen Crook (born 1971), British tennis player
- Henry Crook (1802–1886), English first-class cricketer
- Herbert Crook (born 1965), American basketball player
- Howard Crook (1947–2024), American tenor
- Ian Crook (born 1963), former English professional football player
- Isabel Crook (1915–2023), Canadian-British anthropologist, political prisoner and professor
- J. Mordaunt Crook (born 1937), British architectural historian
- Jack Crook (born 1993), English basketball player
- Jeff Crook, American novelist
- John Crook (disambiguation), multiple people
- Joseph Crook (1809–1884), Liberal British Member of Parliament (1852–1861)
- Kenneth Crook (1920–2012), British politician and diplomat, Governor of the Cayman Islands (1971–1974), Ambassador to Afghanistan (1976–1979)
- Lorianne Crook (born 1957), American radio and television personality
- Lupen Crook (Matthew Pritchard), English musician and songwriter
- Mackenzie Crook (born 1971), British actor
- Malcolm Crook, professor of French history
- Margaret Brackenbury Crook (1886–1972), British Unitarian minister and U.S. professor of religious studies
- Martyn Crook (1956–2008), British soccer coach
- Maryrose Crook, musician and artist from New Zealand
- Max Crook (1936–2020), American musician
- Narciso Crook (born 1995), Dominican baseball player
- P. J. Crook (born 1945), British painter
- Paul Crook (born 1966), American guitarist
- Paul Crook (rugby league, born 1974)
- Paul Crook (rugby league, born 1986)
- Peter Crook (businessman) (born 1963), chief executive of Provident Financial (until 2017)
- Peter Crook (skier) (born 1993), British Virgin Islander Olympic freestyle skier
- Reginald Crook, 1st Baron Crook (1901–1989), British peer
- Robert Crook (disambiguation)
- Steven Crook (born 1983), Australian cricketer
- Terry Crook (born 1947), English rugby league footballer of the 1960s, 1970s and 1980s
- Thomas Crook (1798–1879), New York politician
- Thurman C. Crook (1891–1981), U.S. politician
- T. Mewburn Crook (1869–1949), English sculptor
- Tommy Crook (1944–2026), American musician
- Tony Crook (disambiguation)
- Walter Crook (1912–1988), English footballer and manager
- William Crook (disambiguation)

== Middle name ==
- Thomas Crook Sullivan, United States Army general

== See also ==
- Baron Crook
