= Crooked Creek =

Crooked Creek may refer to:

== Streams ==
=== In Australia ===
- Crooked Creek (Clyde River), a tributary of the Clyde River in New South Wales
- Crooked Creek (Walsh River), a tributary of the Walsh River in Queensland

=== In the United States ===
- Crooked Creek (Alaska) a tributary of the Kasilof River in Kenai Peninsula Borough
- Crooked Creek (Allegheny River), a tributary of the Allegheny River in Pennsylvania
- Crooked Creek (Arkansas), a tributary of the White River
- Crooked Creek (Illinois), a tributary of the Kaskaskia River in Illinois
- Crooked Creek (Indiana), a tributary of the Anderson River
- Crooked Creek (Northern Indiana), a tributary of the Kankakee River
- Crooked Creek (Iowa River tributary), a stream in Iowa
- Crooked Creek (Skunk River tributary), a main tributary of the Skunk River in Iowa
- Crooked Creek (Houston County, Minnesota)
- Crooked Creek (Mississippi River), a tributary of the Mississippi in Minnesota
- Crooked Creek (Bear Creek), a stream in Missouri
- Crooked Creek (Coon Creek), a stream in Missouri
- Crooked Creek (Meramec River), a stream in Missouri
- Crooked Creek (Muddy Creek), a stream in Missouri
- Crooked Creek (North Fork Salt River), a stream in Missouri
- Crooked Creek (Salt River), a stream in Missouri
- Crooked Creek (Wyaconda River), a stream in Missouri
- Crooked Creek (Third Fork), a stream in Missouri
- Crooked Creek (Headwaters Diversion Channel), a stream in Missouri
- Crooked Creek (Rocky River tributary), a stream in Union County, North Carolina
- Crooked Creek (Oregon), a tributary of the Owyhee River
- Crooked Creek (Tennessee), a tributary of the Little River in Blount County
- Crooked Creek (Tioga River), a tributary of the Tioga River in Pennsylvania
- Crooked Creek (Summit County, Utah)
- Crooked Creek (Guyandotte River), a stream in West Virginia
- Crooked Creek (Wenaha River tributary), a stream in Washington and Oregon

== Communities ==
- Crooked Creek, Alaska, a census-designated place (CDP) in Bethel Census Area
- Crooked Creek, West Virginia, an unincorporated community in Logan County
- Crooked Creek, Alberta, an unincorporated community in Canada
- Crooked Creek, Ontario, a community in Canada

== Other ==
- Crooked Creek crater, an impact crater in Crawford County, Missouri, USA
- Crooked Creek Formation, a geologic formation in Meade County, Kansas, USA

== See also ==
- Crooked River (disambiguation)
- Crooked Creek Township (disambiguation)
