= Crooks (surname) =

Crooks is an English surname. Notable people with the surname include:

- Adam Crooks (activist) (1824–1874), Wesleyan Methodist
- Adam Crooks (politician) (1827–1885), Canadian politician
- Ann Marie Crooks (born 1965), female bodybuilder and professional wrestler
- Audi Crooks (born 2004), American basketball player
- Ben Crooks (born 1993), English rugby league footballer
- Bill Crooks (1908–1986), New Zealand horticulturalist
- Brendon Crooks (born 1971), New Zealand judoka
- Charmaine Crooks (born 1962), Canadian athlete
- Colin Crooks (born 1969), British diplomat
- Dave Crooks (born 1963), American politician
- David Crooks (RNZAF officer) (1931–2022), New Zealand air marshal
- Douglas Crooks (1872–1930), Cape Colony cricketer
- Evan Crooks, American actor
- Garth Crooks (born 1958), English former footballer
- Gavin E. Crooks, English chemist
- George Richard Crooks (1822–1897), American Methodist minister, writer, and educator
- Harold Crooks, Canadian-American filmmaker
- Harold Crooks (police), Jamaican police officer
- Hulda Crooks (1896–1997), American mountaineer
- Jack Crooks (1865–1918), American baseball player
- Jacqueline Crooks, British writer
- James Crooks (1778–1860), Scottish businessman
- James White Crooks (1866–1944), Canadian pharmacist, business owner and politician
- Jenelle Crooks (born 1994), Australian racing cyclist
- Jillian Crooks (born 2006), Caymanian competitive swimmer
- John Crooks (disambiguation), various people
- Jordan Crooks (born 2002), Caymanian competitive swimmer
- Julie Crooks, Canadian curator, researcher and instructor
- Kate Crooks (1833–1871), Canadian botanist
- Lee Crooks (born 1978), English former footballer
- Lee Crooks (rugby league) (born 1963), English former rugby league footballer
- Lee Crooks (voice actor) (born 1960), American voice actor
- Leon Crooks (born 1985), English footballer
- Louis Crooks (1912–1989), Archdeacon of Raphoe
- Mary Crooks (born 1950), Australian public policy specialist
- Mildred Lucile Crooks (1899–1972), American abstract expressionist painter
- Morgan Crooks (born 1976), Canadian rower
- N. Patrick Crooks (1938–2015), American Supreme Court judge
- Norman Crooks (1917–1989), American tribal leader
- Parish Lesane Crooks, birth name of Tupac Shakur (1971–1996), American rapper
- Paul Crooks, former Formula One engineer
- Paul Crooks (footballer) (1966–2019), English footballer
- Ramsay Crooks (1787–1859), Canadian fur trader
- Richard Crooks (1900–1972), American tenor
- Richard M. Crooks, American chemist
- Sammy Crooks (1908–1981), English footballer
- Sean Crooks (born 1983), Canadian cross-country skier
- Stanley Crooks (1941–2012), American tribal leader
- Sydney Crooks (born 1945), Jamaican singer and record producer
- Thomas Crooks (disambiguation), various people
- Tim Crooks (born 1949), British former rower
- Will Crooks (1852–1921), British trade unionist
- William Crooks (Canadian politician) (1776–1836), Canadian politician

== See also ==
- Crook (surname)
- Crookes (surname)
