= Crooked =

Crooked may refer to:

- Crooked Creek (disambiguation)
- Crooked Island (disambiguation)
- Crooked Lake (disambiguation)
- Crooked River (disambiguation)
- Crooked Harbour, Hong Kong
- Crooked Forest, West Pomerania, Poland
- Crooked Bridge, a railroad bridge in Saskatchewan, Canada
- Crooked Media, an American left-wing political media company
- The Crooked Castle, part of the Vilnius Castle Complex, Vilnius, Lithuania
- Crooked (album), by Kristin Hersh
- "Crocked", a 2006 film directed by Art Camacho
- "Crooked", a 2008 song by Evil Nine
- Crooked, original title of Game (2011 film), a Hindi action thriller
- "Crooked", a 2013 song by G-Dragon
- Crooked, a 2015 novel by Austin Grossman

== See also ==
- Crooked I, stage name of American rapper Dominick Wickliffe
- Crook (disambiguation)
