= Crook =

Crook is slang for criminal.

Crook or Crooks may also refer to:

== Places ==
=== Canada ===
- Crooks Inlet, former name of Kangiqturjuaq, Nunavut

=== England ===
- Crook, County Durham, a town
- Crook, Cumbria, a village and civil parish
- Crook Hill, Derbyshire, a hill in the Peak District

=== United States ===
- Crook, Colorado, a Statutory Town
- Crook Township, Hamilton County, Illinois
- Crooks, Iowa, an extinct hamlet in Page County
- Crooks Township, Renville County, Minnesota
- Crook, Missouri, an unincorporated community
- Crook County, Oregon
- Crook City, South Dakota, a populated place and census-designated place also known as Crook
- Crooks, South Dakota, a city
- Crook County, Wyoming
- Crook National Forest, Arizona, divided into three other national forests in 1953
- Crook Glacier, Oregon
- Crooks Mound, an archaeological site in Louisiana
- Fort Crook (California) (1857–1869), near Fall River Mills, California
- Fort Crook, Nebraska (1891–1946), near Omaha, Nebraska

== People ==
- Crook (surname)
- Crooks (surname)

== Films ==
- The Crook, English title of Le voyou, a 1971 French movie
- Crook (film), a 2010 Hindi thriller film
- C(r)ook, a 2004 Austrian film
- Crooks (film), an upcoming American drama thriller film

== Television ==
- Crooks (TV series), a 2024 German television series

== Buildings ==
- Crook Hall, a former Roman Catholic seminary near Consett, County Durham
- Crook Hall, Durham, a grade I listed house in Framwelgate, Durham
- Crook Inn, an inn in the Scottish Borders

== Other uses ==
- A bocal, the mouthpiece of a woodwind instrument
- Crook (music), exchangeable section of a brass instrument
- Crook, the crozier carried by a bishop or abbot
- Shepherd's crook
- An angled stem used in securing a laid Devon hedge
- Baron Crook, a title in the Peerage of the United Kingdom
- Crooks (band), an English post-hardcore band
- Crooks Covered Bridge, southeast of Rockville, Indiana, United States, on the National Register of Historic Places
- Crooks Report, a 2008 Belizean government report

== See also ==
- Crooked (disambiguation)
- Crookes (disambiguation)
