= Crooke =

Surname disambiguation

Crooke is a surname which can refer to the following people:

== People ==
- Alastair Crooke (b. 1950), British diplomat and Middle East expert
- Andrew Crooke (died 1674), London publisher, sometime partner of William Cooke
- Edward Crooke (1861–1940), Australian politician
- Frederick Crooke (1844–1923), English cricketer
- Helkiah Crooke (1576–1648), Court physician to King James I of England, Keeper of Bethlem Royal Hospital (1619–1632)
- Iris Crooke (1895–1985), New Zealand nurse and voluntary aid administrator
- John Crooke (disambiguation)
- Leland Crooke, American stage and film actor
- Philip S. Crooke (1810–1881), a United States Republican Congressman from New York
- Ray Crooke (1922–2015), Australian artist
- Samuel Crooke (1575–1649), cleric of the Church of England
- Shenel Crooke (born 1993), sprinter from Saint Kitts and Nevis
- Smedley Crooke (1861–1951), British politician, Member of Parliament (1922–1929, 1931–1945)
- Thomas Crooke (disambiguation)
- William Crooke (disambiguation)

== Places ==
- Crooke, village in County Waterford, Ireland
- Crookhaven, named for Crooke family.

== See also ==
- Cooke
- Crook (disambiguation)
- Crookes (disambiguation)
