= Mystic Lake Amphitheater =

Concert venue in Shakopee, Minnesota, U.S.

- Interactive map of Mystic Lake Amphitheater
- Address: 700 Canterbury Road; Shakopee, Minnesota
- Coordinates: 44°47′28″N 93°28′25″W
- Owner: Live Nation Entertainment
- Operator: Live Nation Entertainment
- Capacity: 19,000

Construction
- Groundbreaking: October 17, 2023
- Opened: June 20, 2026
- General contractor: Swervo Development

Website
- www.mysticlakeamp.com

Mystic Lake Amphitheater is a 19,000-seat concert venue in Shakopee, Minnesota, approximately 16 miles (26 km) southwest of downtown Minneapolis. It opened in June 2026 and is owned and operated by Live Nation Entertainment. It is the largest outdoor music venue in the state of Minnesota, and second-largest in the Minneapolis–Saint Paul area, after the Somerset Amphitheater in Somerset, Wisconsin.

== History ==
The venue was announced in May 2023 after adjacent Canterbury Park sold 37 acres of land to Minneapolis-based Swervo Development for construction of the new facility, commencing in the fall of the same year. In 2025, Live Nation announced the Shakopee Mdewakanton Sioux Community, who owns and operates Mystic Lake Casino Hotel in neighboring Prior Lake, purchased the naming rights for the venue and that it would be named Mystic Lake Amphitheater.

=== Inaugural season ===
The amphitheater held its first event on June 20, 2026, titled "Setting the Stage: An Evening of MN Music, Comedy & Community" featuring an "all-Minnesota" lineup of Minnesota-based artists and performers. Over 500,000 people attended the 41 concerts held at the venue in its inaugural season.

==== Noise complaints ====
Two months after opening, the city of Shakopee began to consider modifying the amphitheater's large-scale event permit to end at 10:00 p.m.—one hour earlier than initially permitted—after nearby residents complained of noise. Some reports indicated that noise from the amphitheater could be heard up to ten miles away in Eden Prairie and Bloomington. By September, Live Nation had made adjustments in the amphitheater to mitigate noise pollution, such as the installation of sound-dampening materials and repositioning stage speakers to direct sound waves downward, toward the bowl.

On November 4, the Shakopee City Council approved a study to monitor noise from the amphitheater in nearby areas from whence the city received complaints.
