= Alja =

Alja is a Slovenian female given name. Notable people with this name include:

- Alja Kozorog (born 1996), Slovenian slalom canoeist
- Alja Omladič (born 1983), Slovenian pop singer
- Alja Varagić, Slovenian handball player
- Alja Robinson Crook (1864–1930), American academic
- Alja Vrček (born 1993), Slovenian handball player
