= Matthew Crooks =

Matthew Crooks may refer to:

- Matthew Crooks Cameron (1822–1887), Canadian politician
- Thomas Matthew Crooks (2003–2024), attempted assassin of Donald Trump

== See also ==
- Matt Crooks (Matt Davidson Rider Crooks, born 1994), British footballer
- Crooks (surname)
