= Charlie Vig =

Shakopee Mdewakanton Sioux leader

Charles (Charlie) R. Vig

Chairman of the Shakopee Mdewakanton Sioux Community
- In office August 25, 2012 – January 31, 2020
- Vice President: Keith B. Anderson
- Preceded by: Stanley Crooks
- Succeeded by: Keith Anderson

Vice Chairman of the Shakopee Mdewakanton Sioux Community
- In office January 2012 – August 25, 2012
- President: Stanley Crooks
- Preceded by: Glynn Crooks
- Succeeded by: Keith B. Anderson

Personal details
- Spouse: Donna Vig
- Children: Five

Charlie Vig is the former Chairman of the Shakopee Mdewakanton Sioux Community of Minnesota. Vig served as the Vice Chairman from January 2012 until August 2012. He then served as chairman from August 2012 to January 2020. The Shakopee Mdewakanton Sioux Community is the most influential Native American tribe in Minnesota and the single-largest benefactor for Indian Country nationally.

Vig was the youngest of his family's nine children. His grandmother, Minnie Otherday, was a descendant of John Otherday, who saved many settlers and U.S. government employees during the Dakota War of 1862. Vig was raised in Eden Prairie, Minnesota. He moved to the region around Prior Lake in 1969 when his parents became some of the founders of the Shakopee Mdewakanton Sioux Community. His father died from cancer when he was nine years old.

He began a career in construction, specifically masonry, once he graduated from high school. Vig married his wife, Donna Vig, a social worker, in 1981; they have five children - four sons and one daughter.

Vig first worked for the Shakopee Mdewakanton Sioux Community in 1992 as a project manager for the tribe's new Mystic Lake Casino, where he oversaw just three employees at the time. He became vice president at the casino within just three years and supervised more than 800 casino employees. He served on the Shakopee Mdewakanton Sioux's board of gambling directors for seven terms. The Shakopee Mdewakanton Sioux Community now employs 4,100 people, making the tribe the largest employer in Scott County, Minnesota.

Charlie Vig was elected Vice Chairman of the Shakopee Mdewakanton Sioux Community in January 2012. He succeeded outgoing Vice Chairman Glynn Crooks, who had served in the office for the prior sixteen years.

Chairman Stanley Crooks died in office of a respiratory and lung ailment on August 25, 2012. According to Shakopee Mdewakanton Sioux, the vice chairman becomes chairman in the instance of a death, so Vig became chairman. The tribe's treasurer and secretary, Keith B. Anderson, became the new Vice Chairman. Vig noted that Crooks' death was a shock, but not entirely unexpected, "The chairman's health had been failing for a while, and this wasn't totally unexpected...One of the reasons I stepped up is because most of the people knew the chairman might not make it to his next term. They had the confidence in me to follow through."

As chairman for the remaining three years of Crooks' term, Vig continued Shakopee Mdewakanton Sioux Community's commitment to charitable donations. The SMSC has donated nearly $272 million to organizations and causes between 1992 and 2013, including more than $29 million in 2012. The tribe has donated more than $350 million to organizations and causes, and is one of the largest charitable givers in Minnesota.

In 2015, the tribe launched Seeds of Native Health, a five-year, $11 million campaign that represents the single-largest coordinated philanthropic effort in American history focused on improving Native American nutrition.

In 2019, the Shakopee Mdewakanton Sioux Community created Understand Native Minnesota, a three-year, $5 million strategic initiative and philanthropic campaign to improve the Native American narrative in Minnesota schools.

Another marker of Chairman Vig's time in office was his commitment to building relationships on behalf of the Shakopee Mdewakanton Sioux Community.

Under his tenure, the tribe constructed a jointly owned water treatment facility with the City of Prior Lake; partnered with the City of Prior Lake on the multimillion-dollar expansion of County Road 83; and contributed more than $30 million in infrastructure improvements that benefit the region.

The former chairman also worked with other Sioux tribes to preserve and protect Pe’ Sla, a sacred site in the heart of the Black Hills in South Dakota.

In 2020, Chairman Vig retired from public service to spend more time with family. The Scott County board of commissioners and the Prior Lake and Shakopee city councils declared January 27 to be Chairman Charlie Vig Day in honor of his impact.
