= Thomas Crooks (disambiguation) =

Thomas Crooks (2003–2024) was an American man who attempted to assassinate Donald Trump.

Thomas Crooks may also refer to:

- Thomas Crooks (American football) (1862–1962), American football coach
- Tom Crooks (fl. 1901–1909), Australian tennis player, who was a runner-up in the 1901 Australian Open; see List of Australian Open men's doubles champions
- Thomas Crooks (fl. 1922), British politician, Liberal Party candidate in the 1922 general election for Darlington (UK Parliament constituency)
- Thomas Crooks (fl. 2016–), Australian martial artist, leading Sōsuishi-ryū practitioner in Australia

== See also ==
- Thomas C. Ferguson (Thomas Crooks Ferguson, 1933–2021), American diplomat
- Thomas Crook (1798–1879), American politician
- Thomas Crook Sullivan (1833–1908), American brigadier general
- Thomas Crooke (disambiguation)
