= Peter Crook =

Peter Crook may refer to:

- Peter Crook (skier) (born 1993)
- Peter Crook (businessman) (born 1963)
