= Bear Creek (Mississippi River tributary) =

Stream in Missouri, U.S.

Coordinates: 39°42′36″N 91°21′07″W

Bear Creek is a stream in Marion and Ralls counties in the U.S. state of Missouri. It is a tributary of the Mississippi River. The creek enters the Mississippi on the southeast side of Hannibal.

Bear Creek was named for the fact bears were hunted there by pioneer citizens.

Crooked Creek, Minnow Branch (Bear Creek tributary) and Mills Creek flow into this creek.

== See also ==
- List of rivers of Missouri
