= Norman Crooks =

Native American leader (1917–1989)

Norman Melvan Crooks (May 28, 1917 – October 20, 1989) was an American tribal leader who served as the first Chairman of the Shakopee Mdewakanton Sioux Community of Minnesota. Crooks' son, the late Stanley Crooks, later served as chairman of the community from 1992 until 2012.

Crooks was one of the founders of the Shakopee Mdewakanton Sioux Community, which was established in 1969 on land near Prior Lake. The land had originally been set aside by the United States government in the 1880s to settle "friendly" Native Americans who had sided with the U.S. during the Dakota War of 1862, a six-week-long conflict which killed more than 600 people.

Norman Crooks became the Shakopee Mdewakanton Sioux Community first chairman in 1969. In 1982, he oversaw the opening of the Little Six, the community's first bingo hall. The hall, now called the Little Six Casino, was a precursor to the Mystic Lake Casino, which opened in 1992.
