= 1910 Dickinson Red and White football team =

American college football season

1910 Dickinson Red and White football
- Conference: Independent
- Record: 3–7
- Head coach: J. Troutman Gougler (1st season)
- Home stadium: Biddle Field

1910 Eastern college football independents records
	Conf.			Overall
Team	W	L	T	W		L		T
Pittsburgh		–		9	–	0	–	0
Harvard		–		9	–	0	–	1
Penn		–		9	–	1	–	1
Princeton		–		7	–	1	–	0
Trinity (CT)		–		7	–	1	–	0
Ursinus		–		6	–	1	–	0
Rhode Island State		–		5	–	1	–	1
Lafayette		–		7	–	2	–	0
Army		–		6	–	2	–	0
Brown		–		7	–	2	–	1
Yale		–		6	–	2	–	2
Dartmouth		–		5	–	2	–	0
Cornell		–		5	–	2	–	1
Penn State		–		5	–	2	–	1
Colgate		–		4	–	2	–	1
Swarthmore		–		5	–	3	–	0
Franklin & Marshall		–		4	–	3	–	2
Syracuse		–		5	–	4	–	1
Rutgers		–		3	–	2	–	3
Carlisle		–		8	–	6	–	0
Holy Cross		–		3	–	3	–	2
Temple		–		3	–	3	–	0
Washington & Jefferson		–		3	–	3	–	1
Wesleyan		–		4	–	4	–	1
New Hampshire		–		2	–	3	–	1
NYU		–		2	–	4	–	1
Geneva		–		2	–	5	–	2
Dickinson		–		3	–	7	–	0
Lehigh		–		2	–	6	–	1
Bucknell		–		2	–	6	–	0
Vermont		–		1	–	5	–	1
Carnegie Tech		–		1	–	6	–	1
Tufts		–		1	–	7	–	1
Boston College		–		0	–	4	–	2
Villanova		–		0	–	4	–	2

The 1910 Dickinson Red and White football team was an American football team that represented Dickinson College in Carlisle, Pennsylvania. The team compiled a 3–7 record while competing as an independent during the 1910 college football season. J. Troutman Gougler was the head coach.

== Schedule ==
Date	Opponent	Site	Result	Attendance	Source
September 24	Western Maryland	Biddle Field; Carlisle, PA	L 0–3		
September 28	at Penn	Franklin Field; Philadelphia, PA	L 0–18		
October 5	Carlisle	Biddle Field; Carlisle, PA	L 0–24	1,500	
October 8	at Lebanon Valley	Annville, PA	W 13–0		
October 15	Bucknell	Biddle Field; Carlisle, PA	W 9–6		
October 22	at Franklin & Marshall	Lancaster, PA	L 0–10		
October 29	Ursinus	Biddle Field; Carlisle, PA	L 3–46		
November 5	at St. John's (MD)	Annapolis, MD	W 12–0		
November 12	at Gettysburg	Gettysburg, PA	L 3–7		
November 24	at Lafayette	Easton, PA	L 0–41		
