= General Sullivan =

General Sullivan may refer to:

- Brad M. Sullivan (fl. 1990s–2020s), U.S. Air Force major general
- Dennis B. Sullivan (1927–2020), U.S. Air Force brigadier general
- Gordon R. Sullivan (born 1937), U.S. Army general
- Jeremiah C. Sullivan (1830–1890), Union Army brigadier general
- John Sullivan (general) (1740–1795), Continental Army major general
- Thomas Crook Sullivan (1833–1908), U.S. Army brigadier general

== See also ==
- Attorney General Sullivan (disambiguation)
