= Crookes (disambiguation) =

Crookes is a suburb of Sheffield, England; also:.

Crookes may also refer to:

- Crookes (ward), an electoral ward in Sheffield, England
- Crookes Cemetery, a cemetery in Sheffield
- Crookes Valley Park, a public park in Sheffield
- Crookes (crater), a lunar crater
- The Crookes, a pop music band
- Crookes tube, an experimental electrical discharge tube
- Crookes radiometer
- The Crookes (film), a 1974 Iranian Persian-genre crime film

== People ==
- Crookes (surname)

== See also ==
- Crook (disambiguation)
- Crooke
