= Crooked Lake =

Crooked Lake may refer to:

- Crooked Lake (Florida), an Outstanding Florida Water
- Crooked Lake Park, Florida, a census designated place in Polk County
- Crooked Lake (Idaho), a glacial lake in Custer County, Idaho
- Crooked Lake, Indiana, an unincorporated community in Steuben County
- Crooked Lake (Michigan), in Emmet County and part of the Inland Waterway
- Crooked Lake (Independence Township, Michigan)
- Crooked Lake (Minnesota–Ontario)
- Crooked Lake Township, Cass County, Minnesota
- Crooked Lake (New York)
- Crooked Lake, Nova Scotia
- Crooked Lake (Saskatchewan)
- Crooked Lake (South Dakota)
- Keuka Lake, New York, formerly referred to as Crooked Lake

== See also ==
- At Crooked Lake, an album by Crazy Horse
- Crooked Lake Canal, New York
- Crooked Lake Outlet Historic District, New York
