= Minnow Branch =

Minnow Branch may refer to:

- Minnow Branch (Bear Creek), a stream in Missouri
- Minnow Branch (Big Buffalo Creek), a stream in Missouri
