= Robert Crook (disambiguation) =

Robert Crook (1929–2011) was an American politician.

Robert Crook may also refer to:

- Robert Crook (MP), MP for Barnstaple
- Robert Douglas Edwin Crook, 3rd Baron Crook, Baron Crook
