= John Crooks =

John Crooks may refer to:

- John Crooks (rugby league), Australian rugby league footballer
- John Crooks (priest) (1914–1995), Dean of Armagh
- Jack Crooks (John Charles Crooks, 1865–1918), American baseball player

== See also ==
- John Crook (disambiguation)
- John Crookes (1890–1948), English cricketer
