= John Crooke =

John Crooke may refer to:

- John Croke or Crooke (1553–1620), Speaker of the English House of Commons
- John Crooke (musician) in Jolene (band) (founded in 1995)
- John Smedley Crooke (1861–1951), British politician

== See also ==
- John Crook (disambiguation), several people
- John Crookes (1890–1948), English cricketer
