= Stanley Crooks =

Chairman of the Shakopee Mdewakanton Sioux Community
- In office 1992 – August 25, 2012
- Vice President: Charlie Vig (2012); Glynn Crooks (1996-2018)
- Preceded by: Leonard Prescott
- Succeeded by: Charlie Vig

Personal details
- Born: November 27, 1941 Pipestone, Minnesota
- Died: August 25, 2012 (aged 70) Shakopee, Minnesota
- Spouse: Cheryl Crooks
- Children: Two Daughters

Stanley R. Crooks (November 27, 1941 – August 25, 2012) served as the Chairman of the Shakopee Mdewakanton Sioux Community of Minnesota from 1992 until his death in August 2012. Crooks became a national Native American leader during his twenty-year tenure. He served in the National Congress of American Indians, the longtime chairman of the Minnesota Indian Gaming Association, and the representative of the Shakopee Mdewakanton to the National Indian Gaming Association.

== Biography ==
=== Early life ===
Crooks' father, Norman Crooks, served as the first Chairman of the Shakopee Mdewakanton Sioux Community. Stanley Crooks served in the United States Navy during the height of the Cuban Missile Crisis.

=== Chairman of the Shakopee Mdewakanton Sioux Community ===
Crooks was elected Chairman of the Shakopee Mdewakanton Sioux Community in 1992, the same year that the tribe's Mystic Lake Casino Hotel opened on the reservation. Crooks defeated his cousin, the incumbent Chairman Leonard Prescott, who had overseen the construction of the casino, in the 1992 tribal election. He would serve six-terms as chairman, spanning twenty years from 1992 to 2012.

Crooks oversaw the economic boom resulting from the launch of the casino. The Shakopee Mdewakanton Sioux employs more than 4,100 people for its casino and non-casino related businesses, with a total payroll of more than $154 million, as of 2012. Under Crooks, the Shakopee Mdewakanton donated more than $243 million to Native American organizations and other charities between 1996 and 2012. It has also issued more than $500 million in loans for economic development since the 1990s.

Stanley Crooks died of a heart attack at St. Francis Regional Medical Center in Shakopee, Minnesota, on August 25, 2012, at the age of 70. He was survived by his wife Cheryl, and two daughters, Cherie and Alisa.

Vice Chairman of the Shakopee Mdewakanton Sioux Community, Charlie Vig, succeeded Crooks as Chairman following his death, as required by the Shakopee Mdewakanton constitution. The tribal secretary and treasurer Keith B. Anderson became the new Vice Chairman. Vig called Crooks "a leader in every sense of the word" adding that, "He was a true mentor and a true leader. We join with his family, friends and all those who were privileged to know Chairman Crooks in mourning his passing."
