= Attorney General Sullivan =

Attorney General Sullivan may refer to:

- Dan Sullivan (U.S. senator) (born 1964), Attorney General of Alaska
- Sir Edward Sullivan, 1st Baronet (1822–1885), Attorney General for Ireland
- George Sullivan (New Hampshire politician) (1771–1838), Attorney General of New Hampshire
- James Sullivan (governor) (1744–1808), Attorney General of Massachusetts
- John Sullivan (general) (1740–1795), Attorney General of New Hampshire

== See also ==
- General Sullivan (disambiguation)
