= William Crook =

William Crook may refer to:

- William H. Crook (1839–1915), one of Abraham Lincoln's presidential bodyguards and longtime White House employee
- William Crook (politician) (1925–1997), American politician, US Ambassador to Australia
- William Pascoe Crook (1775–1846), missionary, schoolmaster and pastor
- Billy Crook (American soccer) (born 1964)
- Billy Crook (English footballer) (1926–2011)

== See also ==
- Billy Crook (disambiguation)
- William Crooke (disambiguation)
- William Croke (disambiguation)
