= William Croke =

William Croke may refer to:

- William Joseph Croke, Canadian politician (1840–1869)
- William Croke (English politician) (died c. 1401)

== See also ==
- William Crooke (disambiguation)
- William Crook (disambiguation)
