= Ministry of Labour Staff Association =

Former trade union of the United Kingdom

- Merged into: Civil and Public Services Association
- Founded: 24 May 1912
- Dissolved: 1973
- Headquarters: 244 Tolworth Rise South, Tolworth
- Location: United Kingdom
- Members: 17,000 (1973)
- Key people: Reginald Crook (Gen Sec)
- Publication: Civil Service Argus
- Affiliations: TUC, CSA

The Ministry of Labour Staff Association (MLSA) was a British trade union representing civil servants working in the Ministry of Labour.

The union was founded in 1912 as the National Federation of Employment Department Clerks, bringing together five largely autonomous regional unions of clerks in the newly-established labour exchanges. The union gradually grew, admitting women from 1914, and temporary staff as associate members from 1918. That year, the regional unions amalgamated fully, and the federation became the Employment Department Clerks' Association.

Despite the amalgamation, the union failed to grow further, partly because temporary staff were not willing to join a union which would permit them only associate status. In an attempt to reinvigorate itself, the union became the "Ministry of Labour Staff Association" in 1924 and, for the first time, appointed a full-time general secretary, Reginald Crook. Temporary staff were finally permitted full membership, and typists, messengers and third class officers were also permitted to join.

The union spent much of its time campaigning for increases in wages, but this only succeeded in 1947, when Ministry of Labour clerks were placed on general civil service pay scales.

In 1939, the union was a founder of the Civil Service Alliance, and in 1943 a founder of the Federation of Ministry of Labour Staffs. It joined the Trades Union Congress in 1948.

Membership of the union was over 17,000 by 1973, when it merged into the Civil and Public Services Association.

== General Secretaries ==
1924: Reginald Crook
1951: Emrys Thomas
1960: John L. Tindall
