= Thomas Crooke =

Thomas Crooke may refer to:

- Thomas Crooke (priest) (c. 1545–1598), English clergyman
- Sir Thomas Crooke, 1st Baronet (1574–1630), English-born politician, lawyer and landowner
- Tom Crooke (1884–1929; Thomas Aloysius Crooke), American baseball player

== See also ==
- Thomas Crook (1798–1879), American politician
- Thomas Crooks (disambiguation), various people
- Thomas (given name)
- Crooke (surname)
- Thomas (disambiguation)
