= Gulfstream Park =

Thoroughbred race course in Broward County, Florida, United States

Coordinates: 25.978474°N 80.13799°W

- Interactive map of Gulfstream Park
- Location: Hallandale Beach, Florida, United States
- Owned by: The Stronach Group
- Date opened: 1939/1944
- Course type: Dirt, Turf, Tapeta
- Notable races: Florida Derby (G1); Pegasus World Cup (G1)

Gulfstream Park is a Thoroughbred horse race track, casino and outdoor entertainment and shopping destination in Hallandale Beach, Florida, United States. It is among the most important venues for horse racing in the United States, and is open 365 days a year.

The venue is owned by The Stronach Group.

== Track attributes ==
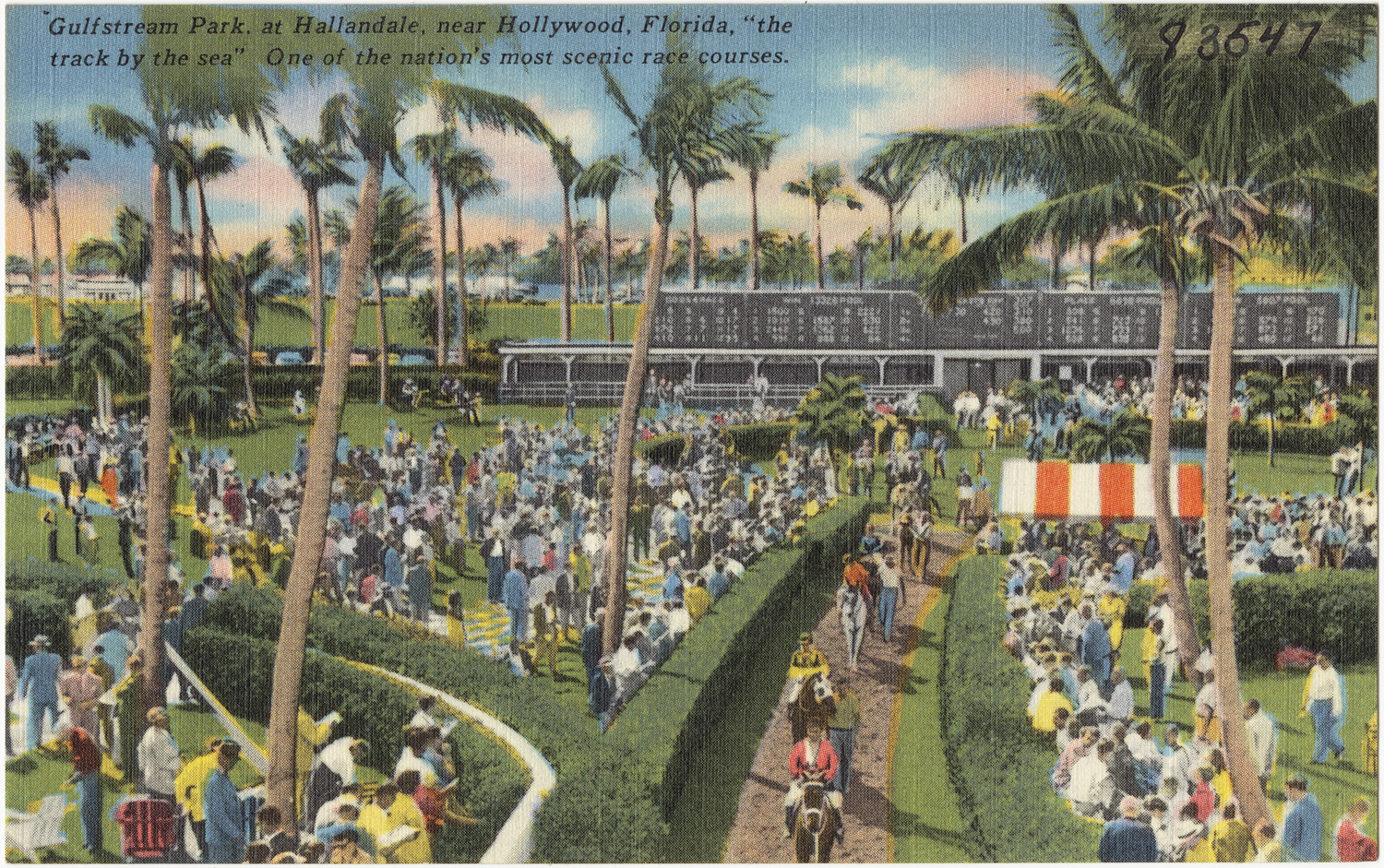
Inside the venue, ca. 1930-1945

Gulfstream Park has three courses, each with a unique racing surface: A 1 1/8-mile dirt track with a backstretch chute that allows for a one-turn mile, a synthetic Tapeta track measuring one mile and seventy yards, and a seven-furlong turf course.

Gulfstream originally had a one-mile dirt track prior to a 2004 renovation, which enlarged the dirt oval by a furlong and widened the turf course from 80 to 170 feet. A second renovation in 2021 replaced the outer portion of the turf course with a Tapeta surface.

== Buildings and grounds ==
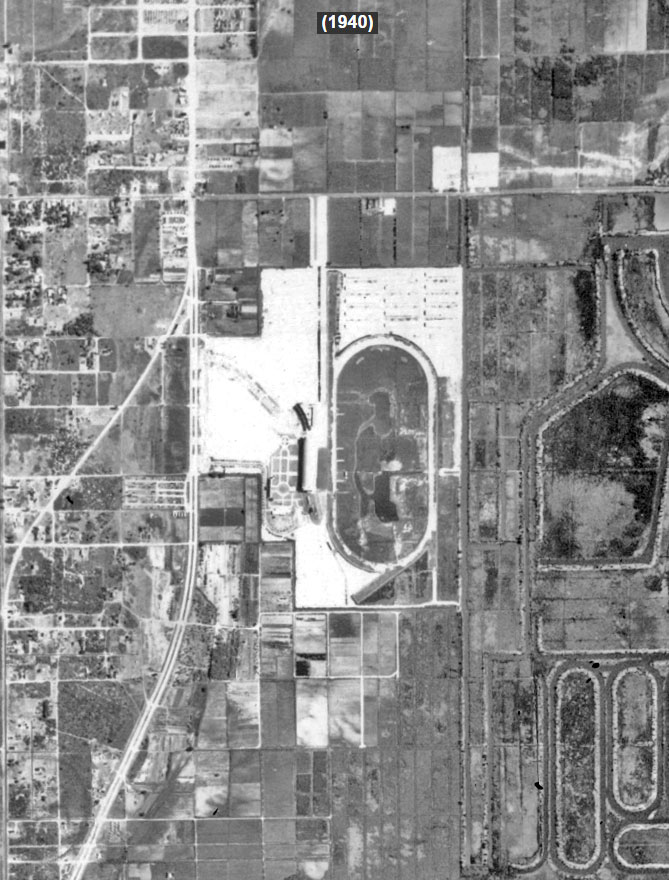
Historic aerial photograph of Gulfstream Park in 1940

Gulfstream Park opened on February 1, 1939, conducting a four-day meeting. Its initial meeting attracted a crowd of 18,000. In 1944, the track was reopened by James Donn Sr. for a 20-day meeting in December.

In 1952, a clubhouse was erected and an addition was put on the grandstand. Gulfstream Park introduced turf racing in 1959. The clubhouse was enlarged in 1961, and the then-world's largest totalizator board was installed in the infield. In 1972, the track was awarded "middle dates" for a 40-day January through April meet. In 1982, the grandstand was again renovated and in 1984 a clubhouse renovation was completed. In 1986, the track added its Gulfdome, a domed dining terrace.

Palm Meadows, Gulfstream's state-of-the-art training facility in Palm Beach County, was opened on Nov. 29, 2002.

In 2004, Gulfstream Park began a $130 million renovation of the grandstand and clubhouse. Slot machines also were approved for the track. The renovation, first effective for the 2006 spring meeting, was criticized by racegoers and commentators, who felt that the new racino laid too much emphasis on the casino area, to the detriment of the racetrack's atmosphere.

2010 marked the beginning of The Village at Gulfstream Park, a 500,000-square-foot mixed use area, taking the place of a parking lot in front of the casino. The project was first discussed when Gulfstream planned the major renovation in 2004. The Village initially set fall 2007 and then fall 2008 opening dates. However, permit issues and the economy held back the project for many years. On February 4, 2010, the site officially opened to patrons heading to Gulfstream.

In September 2013 the park announced another expansion, with construction beginning in March 2014. A highlight would be a 110-ft, fire-breathing bronze statue of Pegasus slaying a dragon, at the time the world's largest equine and European dragon statues. Pegasus would also be the second largest statue in the US after the Statue of Liberty). The statues were completed that year in December. The site also includes rock features, fountains and a stage.

== Timeline ==
The Gulfstream Park Handicap was first run in 1946. The year 1952 saw the first running of the Florida Derby, the state's first stakes with a $100,000 purse. The 1955 Kentucky Derby winner and Horse of the Year Swaps set a then world-record of 1:39 3/5 for a mile and 70 yards while carrying 130 pounds in the Broward Handicap. Gen. Duke equaled the world record of 1:46 4/5 in defeating Bold Ruler in the Florida Derby in 1956. In 1980, Hall of Fame rider Angel Cordero Jr. set a meeting record with 60 wins.

In 1989, Gulfstream Park hosted its first Breeders Cup World Championships, highlighted by the Classic match-up between Kentucky Derby and Preakness winner Sunday Silence and Belmont Stakes winner Easy Goer. Gulfstream would host the Breeders' Cup again in 1992.

Jockey Julie Krone took the Jockey's Title in 1993 with 98 wins. In 1994, Holy Bull won the Florida Derby while, in 1995, Cigar won the Donn Handicap and Gulfstream Park Handicap on his way to a perfect season. Meanwhile, in 1995, Florida Derby winner Thunder Gulch would go on to win the Kentucky Derby (Monarchos would repeat Thunder Gulch's feat in 2001). Gulfstream again would host the Breeders' Cup in 1999.

Hal's Hope, winner of the 2000 Florida Derby, would return in 2002 to win the Gulfstream Park Handicap. The 2002 season introduced the first running of the popular Sunshine Millions, pitting Florida-breds against California-breds for purses totaling $3.6 million. In 2004, trainer Todd Pletcher started an unprecedented run of nine consecutive training titles. In 2006, Hall of Fame jockey Jerry Bailey rode his last race aboard Silver Tree in the Sunshine Millions, and the great Barbaro would win the Florida Derby before making headlines with his victory in the Kentucky Derby.

In April 2012, Javier Castellano, who collected his first Gulfstream title by riding a record 112 wins, scored his 3,000th career success aboard Virtuously on Feb. 24 and Todd Pletcher, who claimed an unprecedented ninth consecutive training title at Gulfstream with 72 trips to the winner's circle, recorded his 3,000 career victory when he saddled Spring Hill Farm for a winning performance on Feb. 11.

Gulfstream Park held the Claiming Crown series of races for ten years, from 2012 until 2021.

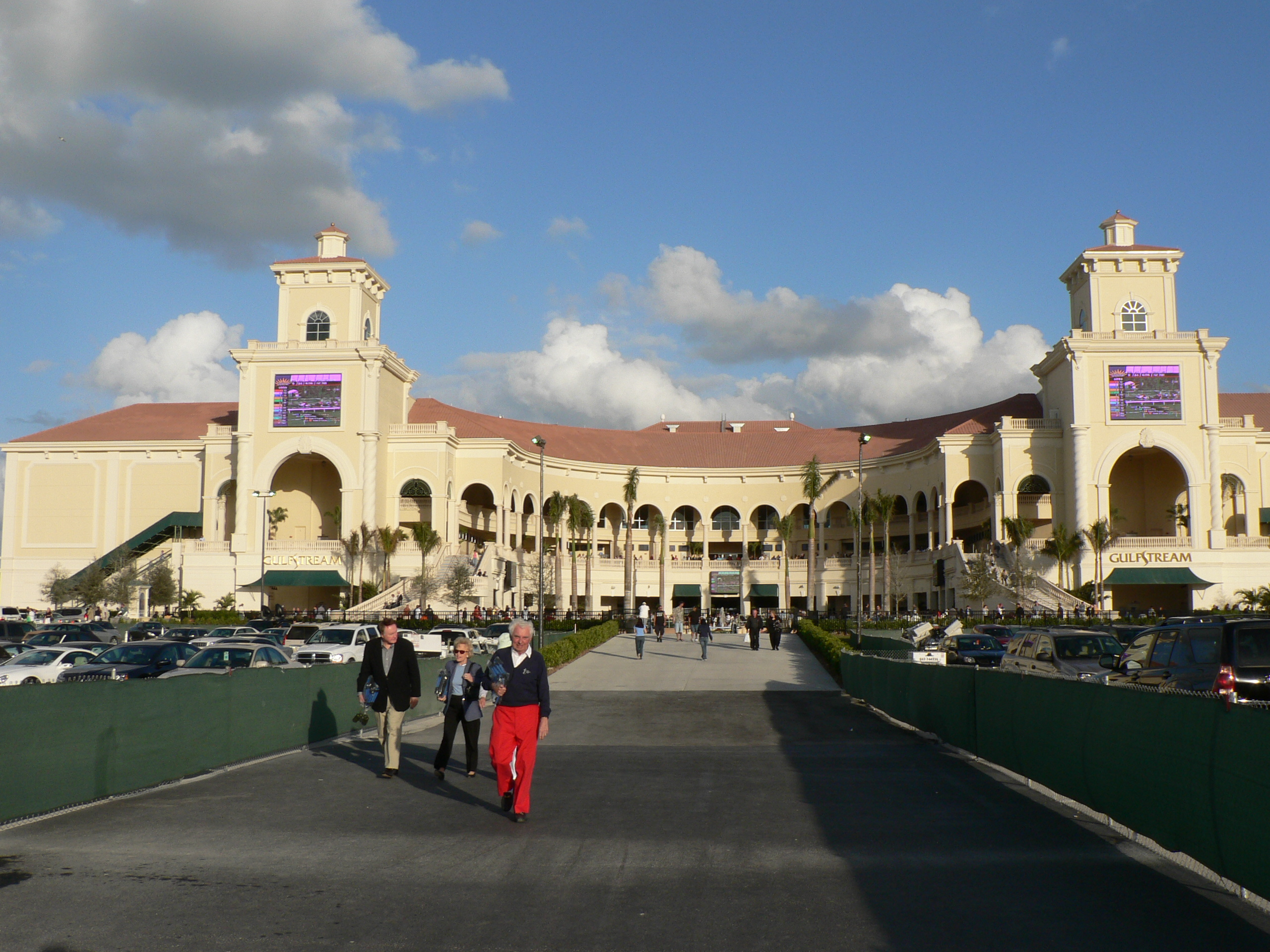
Sunshine Millions Day, 2006

== Track ownership and management ==
In 1961, James Donn Jr. succeeded his father as president of Gulfstream Park. In 1990, the track was purchased by Bertram R. Firestone. In 1994, a half interest in the track was sold to Nigashi Nihon. In 1999, Gulfstream Park was purchased by Magna Entertainment Corporation, for $95 million. In 2010, the ownership of the track was taken over by Magna parent MI Developments Inc. (MID). Since July 3, 2011, the track has been owned by The Stronach Group.

In June 2011, Tim Ritvo was named president and general manager of Gulfstream Park Racing & Casino. He was a prominent jockey and racing official at Suffolk Downs in the 1980s before establishing himself in the 1990s as a leading Florida trainer. Ritvo also had served as vice president and Director of the Florida Horsemen's Benevolent & Protective Association. In 2012, Stronach Group named Ritvo Chief Operating Officer of its Racing Division. He departed from the Stronach Group in March 2020.

Gulfstream Park is owned and operated by 1/ST, the consumer facing brand of The Stronach Group.

== Entertainment ==
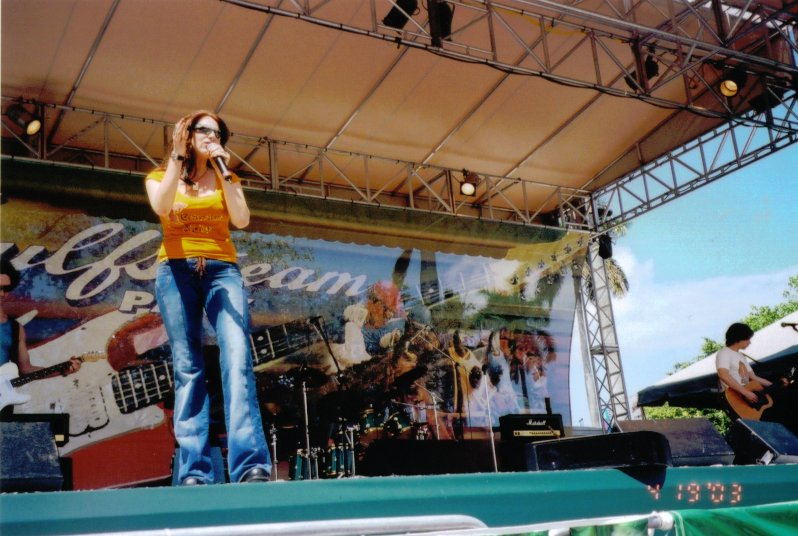
Tiffany, a 1980s teen pop star, performed at Gulfstream Park in 2003.

Gulfstream Park in recent years has been a concert venue, with performances taking place on the grounds outside the grandstand. Reserved seats to the concerts are sold in advance, and others paying normal track admission may watch the concert in standing room. Various singers and groups popular in earlier times perform at Gulfstream Park on their tours. The track was also host to the Miami Pop Festival from December 28–30, 1968, featuring over thirty performing bands and artists, including the Grateful Dead.

In 2022, 1/ST EXPERIENCE in partnership with Breakwater Hospitality Group opened the Carousel Club at Gulfstream Park. The Carousel Club is a 14,000 square foot entertainment and hospitality hotspot featuring a carousel bar and is located trackside at Gulfstream Park.

== See also ==
- List of casinos in Florida
