= Billy Crook =

Billy Crook may refer to:

- Billy Crook (English footballer) (1926–2011), English footballer who played over 200 times for Wolverhampton Wanderers
- Billy Crook (American soccer) (born 1964), U.S. football (soccer) international

== See also ==
- William Crook (disambiguation)
