= Claiming Crown =

Series of horse races

The Claiming Crown, inaugurated in 1999, is a series of eight races run under starter allowance conditions with purses ranging from $100,000 to $175,000. The National Horsemen's Benevolent and Protective Association (National HBPA) and Thoroughbred Owners and Breeders Association (TOBA) together launched this event in cooperation with the Minnesota HBPA and Canterbury Park.

It is seen as a "blue collar” Breeders' Cup series for claiming horses. Any claiming horse owner can participate subject to stipulated conditions.

The Claiming Crown, held under the auspices of the National HBPA and TOBA, was held at Canterbury Park in Shakopee, Minnesota for 10 of its first 12 years of existence. The track last held the event in 2010.

In 2002, the Claiming Crown was held at Philadelphia Park Racetrack; in 2007, it took place at Ellis Park Racecourse; and in 2011 it was held at Fair Grounds.

In 2012, the Claiming Crown moved to Gulfstream Park, where it remained for 10 years. To honor these horses, which the industry calls the "backbone of racing", Gulfstream raised the total purses to $850,000. The following year, total purses hit $1 million for the first time. Gulfstream set several handle records, including the all-time record handle of $14,611,500 set in 2020. During its run at Gulfstream, the names of two races were changed to honor the late Tom Metzen and Kent Stirling, who both made significant contributions to ensure the success of the Claiming Crown.

In 2022, the Claiming Crown was held at Churchill Downs, the home of the Kentucky Derby. The next year the series returned to Fair Grounds.

The 2024 Claiming Crown came back to Churchill Downs in 2024, and is scheduled to be run again at the track on November 15, 2025, with an eight-race card and $1.1 million in purse money.

== The Eight Races ==
Claiming Crown races
| Race name | Claiming Price | Distance | Surface | Restrictions | Purse |
|---|---|---|---|---|---|
| The Iron Horse Kent Stirling Memorial | $7,500 | 1 1/16 miles | Dirt | 3-year-old & up | $100,000 |
| The Ready's Rocket Express | $7,500 | 6 furlongs | Dirt | 3-year-old & up | $100,000 |
| The Glass Slipper | $12,500 | 1 mile | Dirt | 3-year-old & up (f&m) | $100,000 |
| The Rapid Transit | $16,000 | 7 furlongs | Dirt | 3-year-old & up | $100,000 |
| The Canterbury Tom Metzen Memorial | $25,000 or less | 5 furlongs | Turf | 3-year-old & up | $150,000 |
| The Tiara | $25,000 | 1 1/16 miles | Turf | 3-year-old & up (f&m) | $150,000 |
| The Emerald | $25,000 | 1 1/16 miles | Turf | 3-year-old & up | $150,000 |
| The Jewel | $35,000 | 1 1/8 miles | Dirt | 3-year-old & up | $175,000 |
