= Mills Creek (Missouri) =

Stream in the U.S. state of Missouri

Coordinates: 39°41′35″N 91°22′31″W

Mills Creek is a stream in Marion and Ralls Counties in the U.S. state of Missouri.

A variant name was "Mill Creek". Mills Creek has the name of Charles Mill, an early settler.

Daultons Branch flows into this creek.

== See also ==
- List of rivers of Missouri
