= Minnow Branch (Bear Creek tributary) =

Stream in the American state of Missouri

Coordinates: 39.6958787°N 91.3762602°W

Minnow Branch is a stream in Marion County in the U.S. state of Missouri. It is a tributary of Bear Creek.

Minnows in the creek caused the name to be selected.

== See also ==
- List of rivers of Missouri
