= Crooked Creek (Iowa River tributary) =

Stream in Iowa, U.S.

Coordinates: 41°31′38″N 91°32′06″W

Crooked Creek is a stream in the U.S. state of Iowa. It is a tributary to the Iowa River.

Crooked Creek was so named on account of its crooked meanders.
