= Crooked Creek (Coon Creek tributary) =

Stream in the American state of Missouri

Coordinates: 39°07′12″N 91°24′28″W

Crooked Creek is a stream in Montgomery County in the U.S. state of Missouri. It is a tributary of Coon Creek.

Crooked Creek was so named on account of its frequent meanders.

== See also ==
- List of rivers of Missouri
