= Shakopee Mdewakanton Sioux Community =

Indian tribe community in Scott County, Minnesota, United States

Coordinates: 44°45′43″N 93°27′20″W

Mdemayaṭo Oyate
- Tribal Flag

- Shakopee Mdewakanton Sioux Community logo

Total population
- 658 (2010)

Regions with significant populations
- United States (Minnesota)

Languages
- Dakota, English

Related ethnic groups
- other Mdewakanton people, other Dakota people

Location of Shakopee Mdewakanton Sioux Community

The Shakopee Mdewakanton Sioux Community (SMSC; Dakota: Mdemayaṭo Oyate or Ṡákpe Mdewak̇aŋṫuŋwaŋ Dak̇ota Oyate) is a federally recognized, sovereign Indian tribe of Mdewakanton Dakota people, located southwest of Minneapolis and Saint Paul, within parts of the cities of Prior Lake and Shakopee in Scott County, Minnesota. Mdewakanton, pronounced Mid-ah-wah-kah-ton, means "dwellers of the spirit lake."

The tribe owns and operates Mystic Lake Casino Hotel, Little Six Casino, and a number of other enterprises. While Scott County is largely rural, it is located within the Minneapolis–St. Paul–Bloomington, MN–WI Metropolitan Statistical Area. This proximity to a large customer base makes the casino profitable: each member of the tribe receives a payout of around $1 million per year (as of 2012), and the tribe gives large sums to various charitable organizations.

As of 2020, the SMSC reservation and off-reservation trust land totaled 7.99 square miles (5,110 acres; 20.7 km^{2}), all of which is located within or near the original 250-acre (1.0 km^{2}) reservation established for the Tribe in the 1880s. Tribal lands are located in Prior Lake and Shakopee, Minnesota.

Tribal members are direct lineal descendants of Mdewakanton Dakota people who resided in villages near the banks of the lower Minnesota River. A line of leaders known as Chief Ṡaḳpe were spokesmen for their village. The first Ṡaḳpe [pronounced Shock-pay], meaning "six," was named by his people as such after his wife bore sextuplets. The second Ṡaḳpe signed several treaties with the US during the 19th century.

The City of Shakopee later developed near this site and was named for these prominent leaders. The town of Shakopee was named after Ṡaḳpe as well.

== Tribal government ==
The SMSC is governed by the General Council, consisting of all enrolled SMSC members ages 18 and older. The Business Council consists of three members elected every four years by the General Council. The Business Council is responsible for day-to-day operations of the tribe/reservation and implementing General Council decisions. The present Business Council consists of Chairman Cole Miller, Vice-Chairwoman Natasha Hacker, and Secretary/Treasurer Ashley Cornforth.

== History ==
The Dakota people have lived in the Minnesota River Valley for centuries. Historically they fished in the river, gathered wild rice from river's edge beds, as well as nuts and roots, and hunted game.

=== Chief Ṡaḳpe ===
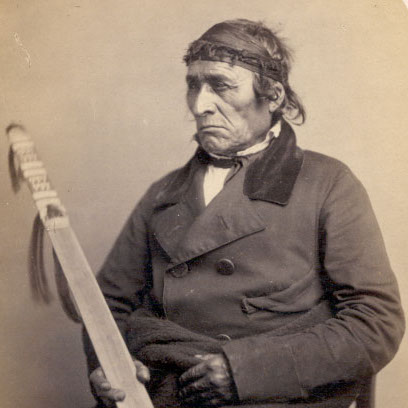
Chief Sakpe II in 1858

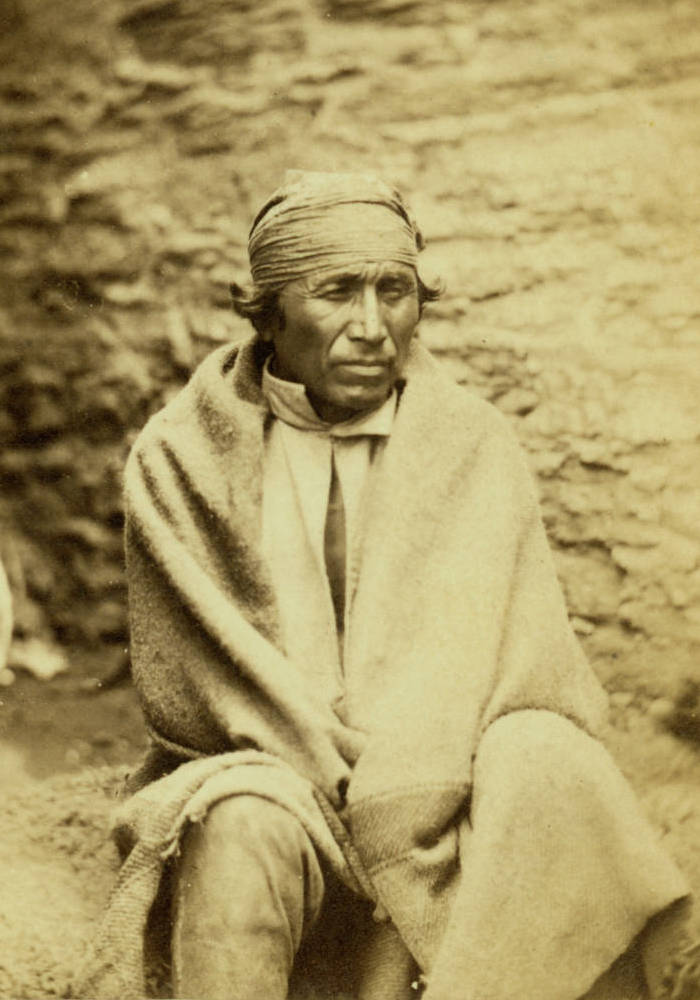
Chief Shakopee III in 1864

Chief Ṡaḳpe (Shock-pay), which means "number six" in the Dakota language, was the name of a line of chiefs of a village in this area. The city of Shakopee later developed near this site and was named for the chiefs. Chief Sakpe I received the name "Ṡaḳpe" because one of his ancestors was the sixth in a set of sextuplets. Chief Ṡaḳpe II (died 1860) signed the 1851 Treaties with the United States on behalf of the Dakota at Traverse Des Sioux and Mendota; he traveled to Washington, DC to sign the 1858 Treaty on behalf of the Dakota.

Chief Ṡaḳpe III (1811–1865) was a leader during the U.S.–Dakota War of 1862. When the Dakota people were exiled after the war, Ṡaḳpe fled to Canada. Later he was turned over to U.S. forces. Reportedly as he was preparing to be hanged on November 11, 1865, he heard a train whistle and said, "As the white man comes in, the Indian goes out."

=== US-Dakota War of 1862 ===
When European-American settlers migrated into their territory in the 1800s, the Dakota people did not have a concept of permanent and exclusive ownership of land. Their conception of land use was that different peoples might live on it and share its resources. The era of settlement in Minnesota was accompanied by the United States forcing the Dakota to cede land forever, diminishing their homeland and their ability to continue their traditional way of life. The new settlers disrupted hunting grounds and restricted fishing on "their" lands. Unable to hunt, fish and gather resources adequately, the Dakota were forced to depend increasingly on the federal government's promises and provisions, often late or spoiled. The federal government's failure to deliver on these promises brought near-starvation and growing anger among the Dakota. Their resentment broke out in the US-Dakota War of 1862.

=== Defeat and hardship ===
The US Army defeated the Dakota rebellion and in the aftermath conducted the largest domestic execution carried out under color of law in the history of the United States: hanging 38 Dakota men in Mankato, Minnesota, on December 26, 1862. The remaining Dakota were forced to walk more than 100 miles to Fort Snelling, where they were held in a prison camp through the winter. In 1863 Congress rescinded all treaties with the Dakota and ordered their removal from Minnesota.

It wasn't until 1886 that Congress established the Shakopee Mdewakanton Reservation, Prairie Island Indian Community Reservation, Upper Sioux Indian Reservation, and Lower Sioux Indian Reservation for the Dakota who never left Minnesota. But for the next century, life for the Dakota people was one of poverty and hardship.

=== Revitalization ===
In 1969 the Shakopee Mdewakanton Sioux Community gained federal recognition as a tribe. They created a government and developed an economic system. In 1982 the tribe opened Little Six Bingo Palace (later Little Six Casino) after Indian gaming was allowed on reservation lands in states that had gaming laws. In 1992 it opened the Mystic Lake Casino Hotel. These enterprises have generated revenues that the tribe has invested in other economic development, tribal welfare, and philanthropy.

A bison herd was established on 165 acres (67 ha) in 2023.

== Economic enterprises ==
The SMSC Gaming Enterprise includes Little Six Casino and Mystic Lake Casino Hotel. With a total of 4,100 employees, the SMSC, Mystic Lake Casino Hotel, and Little Six Casino combined make up the largest employer in Scott County.

On June 4, 2012, the SMSC and Canterbury Park, a horse racing track, announced a ten-year cooperative marketing agreement. The agreement called for the SMSC Gaming Enterprise to create the Mystic Lake Purse Enhancement Fund, which would increase horse racing purses at Canterbury Park by $75 million over the ten years. Edward Stevenson, CEO of the SMSC Gaming Enterprise announced that the agreement would also create new joint marketing opportunities between Canterbury Park and Mystic Lake Casino Hotel, with the Park receiving $8.5 million in payments for these marketing ventures over the course of the agreement. The Mystic Lake Derby was established in 2012 as a new purse race, and the Mystic Lake Mile in 2013. Prior to the start of the 2013 race season, a new tote board was erected at the racetrack.

The SMSC also has retail and other business enterprises, including Dakota Mall, Dakotah Meadows Mini Storage, Dakotah Meadows RV Park, Dakotah! Ice Center, Dakotah! Sport and Fitness, Wozupi Tribal Gardens, Mystic Lake Store at Mall of America in Bloomington, Playworks, Playworks LINK Event Center, Shakopee Dakota Convenience Stores #1 and #2, SMSC Organics Recycling Facility, SMSC Water Bottling Facility, and The Meadows at Mystic Lake (golf course).

The tribe also owns the JW Marriott Minneapolis Mall of America, a 15-level luxury hotel that opened in 2015.

Mystic Lake Center is a newer addition to Mystic Lake Casino Hotel, incorporating expanded hotel space, meeting space, and ballrooms.

In 2025, the tribe opened LaunchPad Golf The Meadows, a year-round golf entertainment complex with a full-service restaurant.

== Charitable activities ==
The tribe has donated more than $350 million to organizations and causes, and is the single-largest philanthropic benefactor for Indian Country nationally.

In 2015, the SMSC launched Seeds of Native Health, a five-year, $11 million campaign that represents the single-largest coordinated philanthropic effort in American history focused on improving Native American nutrition.

Launched in 2019, the tribe’s latest charitable campaign is Understand Native Minnesota, a three-year, $5 million strategic philanthropic initiative to improve the Native American narrative in Minnesota schools.

In addition to charitable giving, the tribe has provided $500 million in economic development loans to fellow tribes. The SMSC made a $31 million loan to Red Lake Nation in 2010, and a $27 million loan in 2013, the latter so that the Red Lake Tribe could construct and operate a gaming casino to generate revenues.

== Reservation ==
=== Geography ===
According to the U.S. Census Bureau in 2020, the Shakopee Mdewakanton Sioux Community reservation had an area of 0.41 square miles (1.1 km^{2}; 260 acres), all of it land. The community also held off-reservation trust land with a total area of 7.58 square miles (19.6 km^{2}; 4,850 acres). The combined reservation and off-reservation trust land have a total land area of 7.99 square miles (20.7 km^{2}).

The community has worked actively to expand its land holdings, adding more than 1,197 acres (1.870 sq mi; 4.84 km^{2}) into trust status between 2016 and 2019.

=== Demographics ===
As of the census of 2020, the combined population of Shakopee Mdewakanton Sioux Community and Off-Reservation Trust Land was 779. The population density was 97.5 inhabitants per square mile (37.6/km^{2}). There were 280 housing units at an average density of 35.1 per square mile (13.6/km^{2}). The racial makeup of the reservation and off-reservation trust land was 63.2% Native American, 20.4% White, 1.9% Asian, 0.9% Black or African American, 0.3% Pacific Islander, 1.4% from other races, and 11.9% from two or more races. Ethnically, the population was 5.9% Hispanic or Latino of any race. The 2020 census results may be inaccurate for locations like the Shakopee Mdewakanton Sioux Community owing to the Census Bureau's implementation of differential privacy protections.

== Notable tribal members ==
- Norman Melvan Crooks (1917–1989), tribal chairman
- Stanley R. Crooks (1941–2012), tribal chairman
- Charlie Vig, tribal chairman
