= Ralph Crookes =

English cricketer

- Born: 9 October 1846; Sheffield, Yorkshire
- Died: 15 February 1897 (aged 50)
- Occupation: First-class cricketer

Ralph Crookes (9 October 1846 – 15 February 1897) was an English first-class cricketer, who played one match for Yorkshire in 1879 against Kent, at Mote Park, Maidstone.

Crookes was born in Sheffield, Yorkshire, England. His only first-class outing brought him little personal glory. He scored a 2 not out at number 11 in Yorkshire's first innings, and then a duck when he was promoted to open second time around. Although he bowled ten overs for just 14 runs in Kent's second innings, he did not take a wicket, and Kent won just seven runs as Yorkshire were bowled out for 114 chasing 121 to win.

He died aged 50, in Sheffield in February 1897.
