= Reginald Crook, 1st Baron Crook =

Crook in 1968

Reginald Douglas Crook, 1st Baron Crook (2 March 1901 – 10 March 1989), was a British civil servant and United Nations official.

A member of the Labour Party, he became a senior civil servant. In 1947 he was raised to the peerage as Baron Crook, of Carshalton in the County of Surrey. He was a Delegate to the United Nations and notably served as Vice-President of the United Nations Administrative Tribunal between 1952 and 1971. He was also Chairman of the National Dock Labour Board from 1951 to 1965. In 1967 he was appointed chairman of the London Electricity Consultative Council and ex officio a part-time member of the London Electricity Board.

Lord Crook married Ida Gertrude, daughter of Joseph Haddon, in 1922. She died in 1985. Lord Crook died in March 1989, aged 88, and was succeeded in the barony by his only son Douglas.

== Arms ==
Coat of arms of Reginald Crook, 1st Baron Crook
Crest Two shepherds’ crooks in saltire Or surmounted by a Tudor rose barbed and seeded Proper. Escutcheon Or on a bend Vert between in chief two Tudor roses barbed and seeded Proper and in base a sprig of oak slipped and fructed of the second a shepherd’s crook of the field. Supporters On the dexter side an antelope gorged with a chaplet of Tudor roses barbed and seeded Proper and on the sinister side a greyhound Argent gorged with a collar Or thereon three cross crosslets and with line reflexed over the back Gules. Motto Crux Scutum

Trade union offices
Preceded by New position	General Secretary of the Ministry of Labour Staff Association; 1924–1951	Succeeded by Emrys Thomas
Peerage of the United Kingdom
New creation	Baron Crook; 1947–1989	Succeeded by Douglas Edwin Crook
