= Crooked Creek (Summit County, Utah) =

Stream in Summit County, Utah, U.S.

Coordinates: 40.6871727°N 111.3285215°W

Crooked Creek is a stream in Summit County, Utah, United States.

Crooked Creek was so named on account of its meandering course.

== See also ==
- List of rivers of Utah
