= Daultons Branch =

Stream in the American state of Missouri

Coordinates: 39.6908786°N 91.3765380°W

Daultons Branch is a stream in Marion County in the U.S. state of Missouri.

Daultons Branch has the name of the local Daulton family.

== See also ==
- List of rivers of Missouri
