= Crooked Creek (Salt River tributary) =

River in Missouri, United States

Coordinates: 39.50818°N 91.39207°W

Crooked Creek is a stream in Pike and Ralls counties in the U.S. state of Missouri. It is a tributary of the Salt River.

Crooked Creek was so named on account of a few meanders along its course.

== See also ==
- List of rivers of Missouri
