= Kangiqturjuaq =

Body of water in Nunavut, Canada

- Coordinates: 63°03′00″N 71°0′01″W
- Type: Inlet

Kangiqturjuaq (Inuktitut syllabics: ᑲᖏᖅᑐᕐᔪᐊᖅ) formerly Crooks Inlet is a body of water in Nunavut's Qikiqtaaluk Region. It lies in western Hudson Strait, forming a wedge into Baffin Island's Meta Incognita Peninsula.
