= William Crooke (disambiguation) =

William Crooke was an orientalist.

William Crooke may also refer to:

- William Crooke (photographer)
- William Crooke (politician) (1815–1901), surgeon and politician in colonial Australia

== See also ==
- William Crook (disambiguation)
- William Croke (disambiguation)
