= Thomas Crooks (American football) =

American football coach

Coaching career (HC unless noted)
- 1910: Dickinson

Head coaching record
- Overall: 1–3

Thomas Crooks was an American college football coach. He was the 11th head football coach at Dickinson College in Carlisle, Pennsylvania. In the second part of the 1910 season, he replaced J. Troutman Gougler and compiled a record of 1–3.
