= Crooked River =

Crooked River may refer to:

== Watercourses ==
=== Australia ===
- Crooked River (New South Wales)
- Crooked River (Victoria)

=== Canada ===
- Crooked River (British Columbia)
  - Crooked River Provincial Park

=== Ireland ===
- Crooked River (Ireland)

=== New Zealand ===
- Crooked River (New Zealand)

=== United States ===
- Crooked River (Florida)
- Crooked River (Georgia)
- Crooked River (Idaho)
- Crooked River (Maine)
  - Crooked River (Machias River)
  - Crooked River (Songo River)
- Crooked River (Maryland)
- Crooked River (Massachusetts)
- Crooked River (Michigan)
- Crooked River (Missouri)
- Crooked River (Oregon)
  - Crooked River National Grassland
  - Crooked River Ranch, Oregon
  - Crooked River Gorge
- The Cuyahoga River in Ohio is sometimes called the Crooked River

== Other uses ==
- Crooked River (film), a 1950 Western film starring James Ellison
- Crooked River, Saskatchewan, a special service area in the Canadian province of Saskatchewan

== See also ==
- Crooked Creek (disambiguation)
