= Crooked Island =

There are at least two Crooked Islands:

- Crooked Island, Hong Kong, also called "Kat O"
- Crooked Island, Bahamas
- Crooked Island (Michigan) in Lake Huron
