= Carl Crook =

English boxer

Personal information
- Nationality: English
- Born: 10 November 1963 (age 62) Bolton, England
- Height: 5 ft 10 in (1.78 m)
- Weight: lightweight light welterweight

Boxing career
- Stance: Orthodox

Boxing record
- Total fights: 31
- Wins: 26 (KO 13)
- Losses: 4
- Draws: 1
- No contests: 0

Carl Crook (born 10 November 1963, in Bolton) is an English former professional lightweight and light welterweight boxer. As an amateur, he was runner-up in the 1985 Amateur Boxing Association of England (ABAE) lightweight championship against Eamon McAuley of Hogarth Amateur Boxing Club, As a professional, he won the Central Area lightweight title, British lightweight title, and the Commonwealth lightweight title, and was also a challenger for the EBU (European) lightweight title.

It was only after 117 amateur bouts he emerged as a professional and captured two lightweight titles. Carl and his family moved from Bolton to Adlington and he made his debut in boxing in Chorley. Carl had to wait until January 27, 1975 for his first bout as he was not allowed to fight until he is 11 years old. In 1980 he joined the Army and continued his love and passion for the sport. He missed out on an opportunity to represent Britain in the Olympic Games in 1984 as he lost the ABA Finals. Carl claimed his first title at the Preston Guild Hall against Moroccan-born Najib Daho in 1990. In May 1992, he gained British and Commonwealth defenses against Glaswegian Steve Boyle in Preston. Carl's last pro-fight was quite memorable in Levallois, France a knockout against Jean-Baptiste Mendy in his second European title attempt in April 1993. It was a voluntary title defense and took Jean-Baptiste Mendy to the eighth round. Now, he gives shape training at Natbridge Boxing Club, Leyland, offering advice to younger fighters.
