= Crooked Creek (Muddy Creek tributary) =

Stream in the US state of Missouri

Coordinates: 38°40′25″N 93°30′30″W

Crooked Creek is a stream in Johnson and Pettis counties of the U.S. state of Missouri. It is a tributary of Muddy Creek.

The stream headwaters arise at in western Pettis County about 125 feet east of the Pettis-Johnson county line approximately five miles north of Windsor. The stream flows generally due north parallel to the county line and routes B and AA past the community of Owsley. The stream veers west into Johnson County for the last half mile before entering Muddy Creek at about three miles southeast of Whiteman Air Force Base.

Crooked Creek was so named due to the frequent meanders along its course.

== See also ==
- List of rivers of Missouri
