= Crooked Creek (Bear Creek tributary) =

Stream in the U.S. state of Missouri

Crooked Creek is a stream in Ralls County in the U.S. state of Missouri. It is a tributary of Bear Creek.

The stream headwaters arise east of Missouri Route HH at 39°40′00″N 91°28′59″W at an elevation of approximately 735 feet. The stream flows east crossing under Route HH and then turns to the north again passing under Route HH. It continues to the north-northeast to its confluence with Bear Creek less than 500 feet south of the Ralls-Marion county line at 39°41′02″N 91°26′41″W and an elevation of 551 feet.

Crooked Creek was so named on account of frequent meanders on its course.

== See also ==
- List of rivers of Missouri
