= Jack Crook =

English basketball player

manchester giants
- Position: Center
- League: BBL

Personal information
- Born: 15 September 1993 (age 33) Manchester, England
- Listed height: 6 ft 11 in (2.11 m)
- Listed weight: 255 lb (116 kg)

Career information
- College: Seattle (2012-16)
- NBA draft: 2016: undrafted
- Playing career: 2016–present

Career history
- 2016-2017: CB Agustinos Eras

Jack Crook (born 15 September 1993) is an English professional basketball player, currently with Manchester Giants.

== Personal ==
Crook is a pre-major in the College of Arts and Sciences. He was a member of the squad that traveled to China in late August 2012.

== Early years ==
Crook began his career with Manchester Magic, and he was also named as the MVP of the Under-18 National Cup in England. After leading his team to the tournament title with 24 points and 11 rebounds in the final game. He also played for England's Division B squad at U18 European Championship in 2011 in Bulgaria. Averaging 4.6 points and 5.3 rebounds in seven games.

== Collegiate career ==
=== Freshman season ===
In Crook's freshman season at the Seattle University, he appeared twenty-nine games, averaging 2.5 points and 2.1 rebounds per game. on 5 January 2013, Crook scored a season-high eight points against San Jose State University.

=== Sophomore season ===
Crook appeared in all thirty games in his sophomore season, including twenty-eight starts. Averaging 5.1 points, 6.0 rebounds and 1.0 assist per game. He also notched Double-double with 13 points and 10 rebounds during WAC Tournament against New Mexico State.

=== Junior season ===
In his junior season, Crook averaged 6.7 points, 5.6 rebounds and 1.6 assist per game. Early in January 2015, Crook scored a season high 19 points together with 3 rebounds and 1 assist against CSU Fullerton.

=== Senior season ===
As a senior, Crook has started all thirty-two games, averaging 10.1 points 6.0 rebounds and 1.9 assist per game. On 6 December, Crook scored his career high 22 points against Mississippi Valley State and later tied it, together with 10 rebounds on 18 February against UT Rio Grande Valley.

== Professional career ==
=== Europe ===
Following his graduation from Seattle University, Crook signed his first professional contract with CB Agustinos Eras of the Spanish LEB Plata. On 8 October 2016 he scored a season-high 26 points with 14 rebounds against CB Zamora. Crook also grabbed a season-high 17 rebounds together with 15 points against CB L'Hospitalet. He averaged 9.9 points, 9.5 rebounds and 0.6 assist at the end of 2016–17 season.

On 26 January 2018 Crook signed for Manchester Giants for the remainder of the 2017–2018 season.

In August 2025 he started working for Ste Bell.
