= Geoffrey Crook =

English cricketer

Personal information
- Full name: Geoffrey David Crook
- Born: 30 October 1978 (age 48); Cambridge, Cambridgeshire, England
- Batting: Left-handed
- Bowling: Left-arm fast-medium

Domestic team information
- Years: Team
- 2000–2002: Staffordshire

Career statistics
Competition	List A
Matches	1
Runs scored	0
Batting average	0.00
100s/50s	–/–
Top score	0
Balls bowled	60
Wickets	2
Bowling average	21.50
5 wickets in innings	–
10 wickets in match	–
Best bowling	2/43
Catches/stumpings	–/–
- Source: Cricinfo, 13 June 2011

Geoffrey David Crook (born 30 October 1978) is a former English cricketer. Crook was a left-handed batsman who bowled left-arm fast-medium. He was born in Cambridge, Cambridgeshire.

Crook made his debut for Staffordshire in the 2000 Minor Counties Championship against Bedfordshire. Crook played Minor counties cricket for Staffordshire from 2000 to 2002, which included 5 Minor Counties Championship matches and 3 MCCA Knockout Trophy matches. In 2002, he made his only List A appearance against Warwickshire in the Cheltenham & Gloucester Trophy. In this match, he took 2 wickets for 43 runs from 10 overs. With the bat he was dismissed for a duck by Alan Richardson.
