= Crooked Creek (Guyandotte River tributary) =

Stream in West Virginia, U.S.

Coordinates: 37°52′41″N 81°59′16″W

Crooked Creek is a stream in the U.S. state of West Virginia. It is a tributary of the Guyandotte River.

Crooked Creek was so named on account of its irregular course.

== See also ==
- List of rivers of West Virginia
