= Crooked Lake (Minnesota–Ontario) =

Lake on border of Minnesota, United States, and Ontario, Canada

- Location within Minnesota
- Location: Minnesota, United States and Ontario, Canada
- Coordinates: 48.195521°N 91.794628°W
- Type: Lake
- Surface elevation: 1,243 feet (379 m)

Crooked Lake is a lake that straddles the border of the state of Minnesota in the United States and the province of Ontario in Canada. It is part of the Basswood River, and extends from Lower Basswood Falls to Curtain Falls. The U.S. portion of the lake is located in Saint Louis County, within the Boundary Waters Canoe Area Wilderness in the Superior National Forest; the Canadian waters are part of Quetico Provincial Park.

Pictographs of the First Nations are visible near Lower Basswood Falls. More recent visitors to the area were French fur traders known as voyageurs, and the name of Crooked Lake reportedly was derived from the French word crocher, meaning hooked.

== See also ==
- List of lakes in Minnesota
- List of lakes in Ontario
