= James White Crooks =

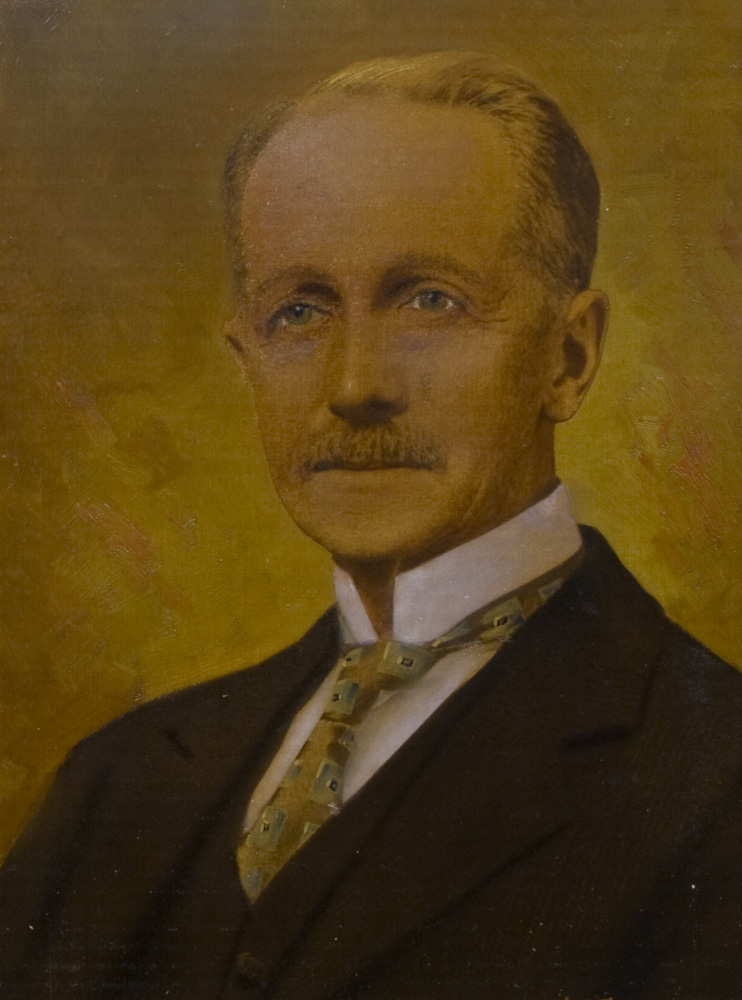
Painting of Crooks in 1925

James White Crooks (February 3, 1866 – September 4, 1944) was a pharmacist, business owner and politician in Ontario, Canada. He served as mayor of Port Arthur from 1924 to 1925.

He was born in Woodstock, Canada West and was educated at the Ontario College of Pharmacy. He lived for a short time in West Duluth, Minnesota before moving to Port Arthur in 1886. He opened a drug store in 1891 and went into partnership with Thomas Smellie in 1895. By 1909, he was sole owner of several drug stores in Port Arthur and Fort William. Crooks retired from business in 1935; the pharmacy remained in the family until 1986, when it was purchased by Shoppers Drug Mart. An earlier attempt by Shoppers to purchase the company in 1979 had been turned down by the Canadian Foreign Investment Review Agency.

He served on Port Arthur city council from 1920 to 1923.

Crooks died in St. Petersburg, Florida at the age of 78.
