= Crooked Creek (Wyaconda River tributary) =

Stream in the American state of Missouri

Coordinates: 40°10′50″N 91°35′36″W

Crooked Creek is a stream in Lewis County in the U.S. state of Missouri. It is a tributary of the Wyaconda River.

Crooked Creek was so named on account of its frequent meanders.

== See also ==
- List of rivers of Missouri
