= Margaret Brackenbury Crook =

British Unitarian minister, women's suffrage and peace activist (1886–1972)

Personal life
- Born: Margaret Brackenbury Crook; 5 May 1886 Dymock, Gloucestershire, UK
- Died: 24 May 1972 (aged 86)
- Notable work(s): Women and Religion
- Education: St Anne's College, Oxford; Manchester College, Oxford

Religious life
- Religion: Christian
- Denomination: Unitarianism
- Church: Octagon Chapel, Norwich, Women's International League for Peace and Freedom

Margaret Brackenbury Crook (5 May 1886 – 24 May 1972) was a British Unitarian minister, a women's suffrage and peace activist, and a professor of religious studies in the United States. She was one of the first women ministers to be granted sole authority over a large English church. She is remembered mainly for the strongly feminist biblical exegesis in her 1964 book Women and Religion.

== Early life ==
Margaret Brackenbury Crook was born on 5 May 1886 in Dymock, England, the eldest of three children of Ellen Brackenbury Crook and Rev. L. G. Harris Crook, a Unitarian minister. Her great uncle was the Liberal MP for Bolton, Joseph Crook. Her great-grandfather was another notable Unitarian minister, George Harris. Her father died when she was eight years old, an event that spurred in her a desire to carry on his ministry.

== Education ==
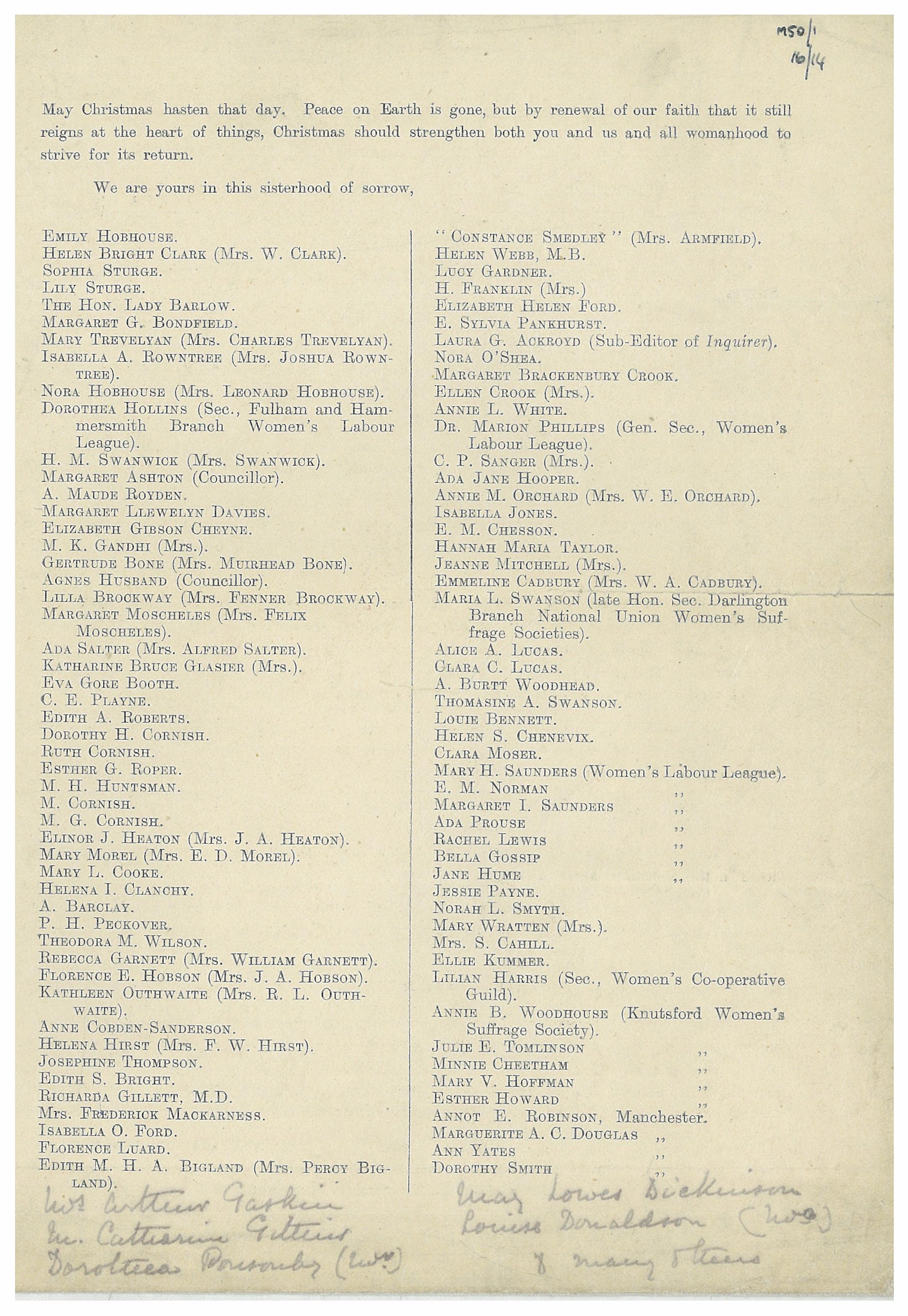
Open Christmas letter from the Suffragettes of Manchester, signed by, among others, Brackenbury Crook.

In 1910, Crook began college studies through the Society of Oxford Home Students, which later became St Anne's College, Oxford. At the time, Oxford did not grant degrees to women, so Crook received her B.A. (with first-class honors) from the University of London, in 1913. The following year, Oxford University awarded her a diploma in anthropology with distinction.

In 1914, Crook sought admission to Manchester College, Oxford for ministerial studies but met with difficulties. College trustees accepted that she was intellectually qualified and showed potential as a minister, but questioned the "normalcy" of a woman attempting to become a Unitarian minister. She was eventually admitted and remained at the college for three years, graduating first in her class and gaining her certificate in 1917.

While at Manchester College, Crook became a social activist, joining the Young Liberal Women in Wolverhampton and the Women's Social and Political Union, both women's suffrage groups. She also worked with the Quakers on matters to do with court cases involving conscientious objectors to World War I. During the height of the war, in 1916–17, she went to France to carry out refugee work with the Friends War Relief Committee, later writing about her experiences in the story collection The Track of the Storm.

== Ministry and academic career ==
After the war, Crook took up a posting as minister at the 18th century Octagon Chapel in Norwich, thereby becoming the first Unitarian woman minister to be given sole authority over a large church. During her tenure there, she reorganized the Sunday school and set up a play center for children. She left in 1920 to join her mother and two brothers, who had moved to America.

In America, Crook had difficulty finding a posting because the president of the American Unitarian Association, Samuel Atkins Eliot, actively excluded women ministers. Crook instead took the post of executive secretary of the American branch of the Women's International League for Peace and Freedom, which was based in New York. Crook toured women's colleges, speaking to students about the league's objectives. When the president of Smith College, William Allan Neilson, heard her speak, he offered her a position in the Department of Religion and Biblical Literature. Her family joined her in Northampton, Massachusetts when she took up her associate professorship in 1921, and she supported them financially.

Reinventing herself as a professor of religious studies—a position she would hold for 33 years—Crook specialized in biblical scholarship, especially the Hebrew Old Testament, and joined the Society of Biblical Literature and Exegesis (a scholarly organization) and the National Association of Biblical Instructors. She also served as president (1942) of the Corporation of the American Schools of Oriental Research. She published numerous articles and reviews in her area of research, some devotional poems, and four books. She wrote eight of the 20 essays in the 1937 anthology The Bible and Its Literary Associations, which she also edited. Crook's contributions emphasize the links between the Bible and the stories of other ancient cultures such as Egypt and Babylon, discuss the range of religious texts that were excluded from the Bible, and examine the difficulties of Biblical translation. Her 1956 book The Cruel God is a re-examination of the Book of Job in light of contemporary Biblical scholarship.

Crook's last published book, Women and Religion (1964), offered an overtly feminist examination of the Bible and the ways in which it has been interpreted over the centuries. In her reassessment of the Scriptures and the history of women's participation in western religion, she argued that there was a significant theological cost to pursuing a path that kept women at a lower status within the church. Pragmatically, she noted how much damage Samuel Atkins Eliot and his kind had done to the Unitarian ministry in the United States, where women ministers had declined from 29 in 1900 to 2 active ministers in 1948. Crook acknowledged that Women and Religion was inspired in part by her reading of Betty Friedan's 1963 book The Feminine Mystique. Reviews of the book were mixed, with praise centering on Crook's sophisticated scholarship; it would take another two decades for religious scholars to begin championing the book for its specifically feminist ideas.

In 1923–24, Crook went on a speaking tour throughout the eastern United States, lecturing on subjects such as women in the ministry, Christian fundamentalism, and the peace movement. Crook was also supportive of the local Unitarian Church, where she worked with women and children in various capacities. Despite the fact that she was never able to get the American Unitarian Association to recognize her as a minister, she wrote at one point: "I have always considered my life-work in religion a ministry".

In addition to her academic work, Crook was heavily involved in a variety of organizations. She was a member of the St. Anne's Society, the Society of Biblical Literature and Exegesis, the National Association of Biblical Instructors, the American Association of University Professors, served as the Smith College representative on the Corporation of the American Schools of Oriental Research, was an honorary lecturer at the Jerusalem school of Oriental research during the summer of 1934, served as president and honorary secretary of the Alumni of the American Schools of Oriental Research in 1943, 1942. She also served as president of the Women's Alliance of the Unitarian Church of Northampton and Florence, Massachusetts.

Crook retired from Smith College in 1954 but continued her scholarly research as an emerita professor for another eight years under the title of Sophia Smith Fellow. In that same decade, she returned to Manchester College, her ministerial alma mater, as a visiting lecturer.

== Death ==
Crook lived in Northampton with her brother Waldo, who took care of her for the last few years of her life when her health began to fail. Crook died on 24 May 1972, just after finishing a book (still unpublished) on the Apostle Paul.

== Works ==
- Women and Religion (1964) Boston: Beacon Press
- The Cruel God: Job's Search for the Meaning of Suffering (1959) Boston: Beacon Press
- The Bible and Its Literary Associations (1937) New York: Abingdon Press [edited volume]
- The Track of the Storm: Tales of the Marne, the Meuse, and the Aube (1917) London: Headley Bros. [story collection
