= Little Six Casino =

Casino in Minnesota

Coordinates: 44.7362°N 93.4728°W

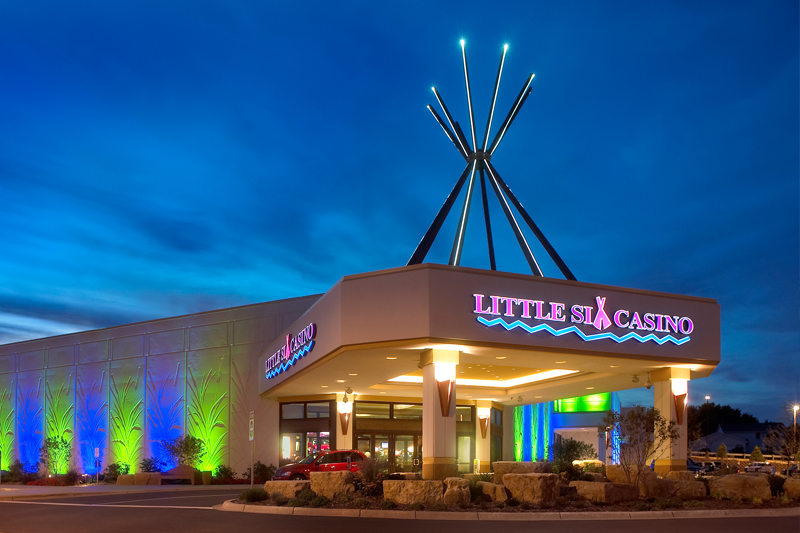
- Little Six Casino in Prior Lake, Minnesota
- Interactive map of Little Six Casino
- Location: 2450 Sioux Trail NW Prior Lake, Minnesota 55372
- Opened: October 1982
- Notable restaurants: Little Six Restaurant
- Casino type: Land-based
- Owner: Shakopee Mdewakanton Sioux Community
- Previous names: Little Six Bingo (1982–1990)
- Website: http://www.littlesixcasino.com/

Little Six Casino is owned and operated by the Shakopee Mdewakanton Sioux Community in Prior Lake, Minnesota, southwest of the Minneapolis–Saint Paul metropolitan area. The casino features slots and live dealer blackjack tables. With 4,100 employees, the SMSC, Mystic Lake Casino Hotel, and Little Six Casino combined are the largest employer in Scott County.

Little Six is named after Little Six, a leader during the Dakota War of 1862. Its sister casino is Mystic Lake Casino Hotel.

== History ==
Little Six Casino is owned and operated by the Shakopee Mdewakanton Sioux Community (SMSC), a federally recognized, sovereign Indian tribe.

The SMSC opened Little Six Bingo in 1982, which became Little Six Casino in 1990 following the passage of the federal Indian Gaming Regulatory Act of 1988 and the signing of a gaming compact between the SMSC and State of Minnesota. Little Six Casino opened in its new facility in 2007.

== Awards ==
The SMSC Gaming Enterprise, which includes Little Six Casino and Mystic Lake Casino Hotel, received a “Best Places to Work” award from the Minneapolis/St. Paul Business Journal in 2012 and 2013 and a “Top 100 Workplaces” award from the Minneapolis Star Tribune in 2013.

== See also ==
- Shakopee Mdewakanton Sioux Community
- List of casinos in Minnesota
