= Crooked Lake, Nova Scotia =

Crooked Lake may refer to any of the following lakes in Nova Scotia:

In the Municipality of Clare:

- Crooked Lake at 44°16′33″N 66°3′48″W

In the District of Guysborough:

- Crooked Lake at 45°22′13″N 61°53′50″W

In Halifax Regional Municipality:

- Crooked Lake at 45°13′41″N 62°43′18″W
- Crooked Lake at 45°1′28″N 62°35′54″W
- Crooked Lake at 45°9′53″N 62°51′32″W
- Crooked Lake at 44°59′38″N 63°1′27″W
- Crooked Lake at 44°52′20″N 62°51′2″W
- Crooked Lakes at 44°52′11″N 62°43′37″W

In Kings County:

- Crooked Lake at 44°54′22″N 64°33′21″W

In District of Lunenburg:

- Crooked Lake at 44°16′35″N 64°35′18″W

In Richmond County:

- Crooked Lake at 45°42′11″N 60°20′45″W
