= Canterbury Park =

Horse racing facility in Minnesota, US

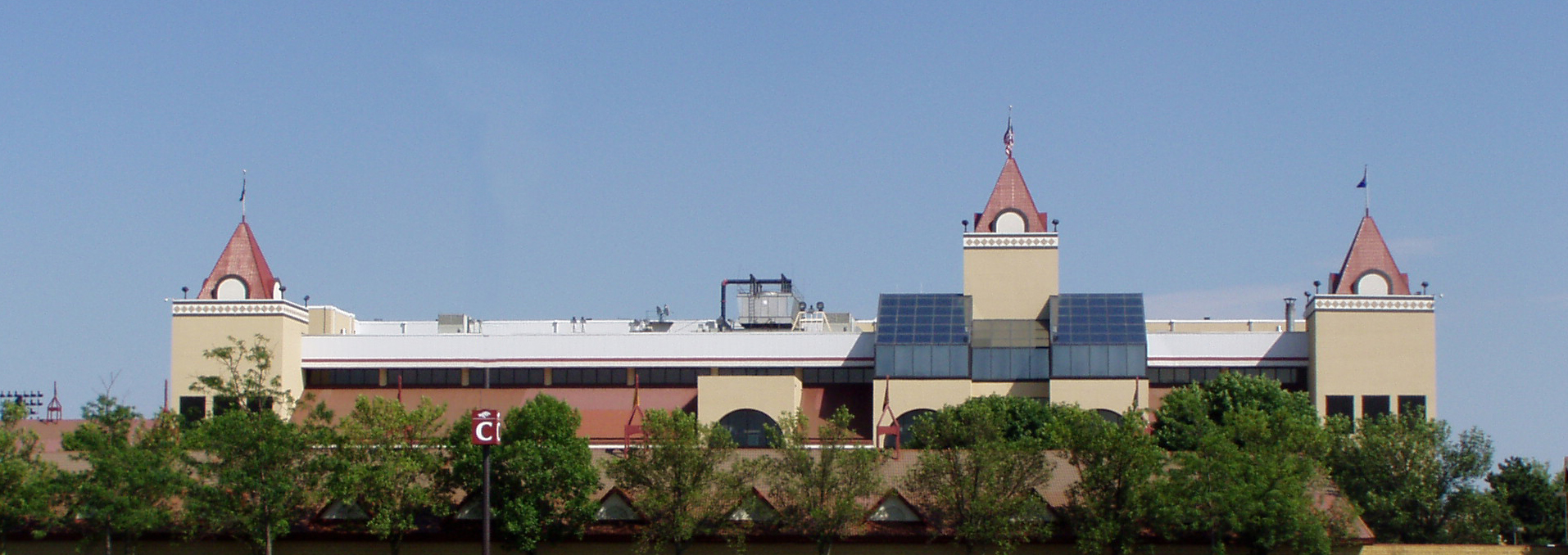
- Interactive map of Canterbury Park
- Location: Shakopee, Minnesota
- Coordinates: 44°47′22.67″N 93°28′48.36″W
- Owned by: Canterbury Park Holding Corporation
- Date opened: June 26, 1985
- Race type: Thoroughbred
- Notable races: Claiming Crown

Canterbury Park Holding Corporation
- Type: Public
- Traded as: Nasdaq: CPHC

Canterbury Park (formerly Canterbury Downs) is a horse racing track in Shakopee, Minnesota, United States. Canterbury Park Holding Corporation ("Canterbury Park") hosts parimutuel wagering on live thoroughbred and quarter horse racing at its facilities in Shakopee and parimutuel wagering on races held at out-of-state racetracks that are simulcast to the racetrack. In addition, the Canterbury Park Card Casino operates 24 hours a day, seven days a week, and is also regulated by the Minnesota Racing Commission. Casino games include blackjack, baccarat, Ultimate Texas Hold 'Em, and poker. Canterbury Park also derives revenue from related services and activities, such as concessions, parking, admissions, and programs, and from other entertainment events held at the racetrack. Furthermore, Canterbury Park is pursuing a strategy to enhance shareholder value by developing approximately 140 acres of underutilized land surrounding the racetrack in a project known as Canterbury Commons. The company is pursuing several mixed-use development opportunities for the underutilized land, directly and through joint ventures.

Canterbury Park hosted the Claiming Crown of horseracing for 10 of its first 12 years of existence, through 2010. The inaugural Mystic Lake Derby, offering the largest purse at the track since 1991, was run on July 28, 2012. The race was won by the 3-year-old Hammers Terror in a time of 1:37.18 over the one-mile turf event.

A two-week series of poker tournaments, Fall Poker Classic, is held each fall at Canterbury Park.

== History ==
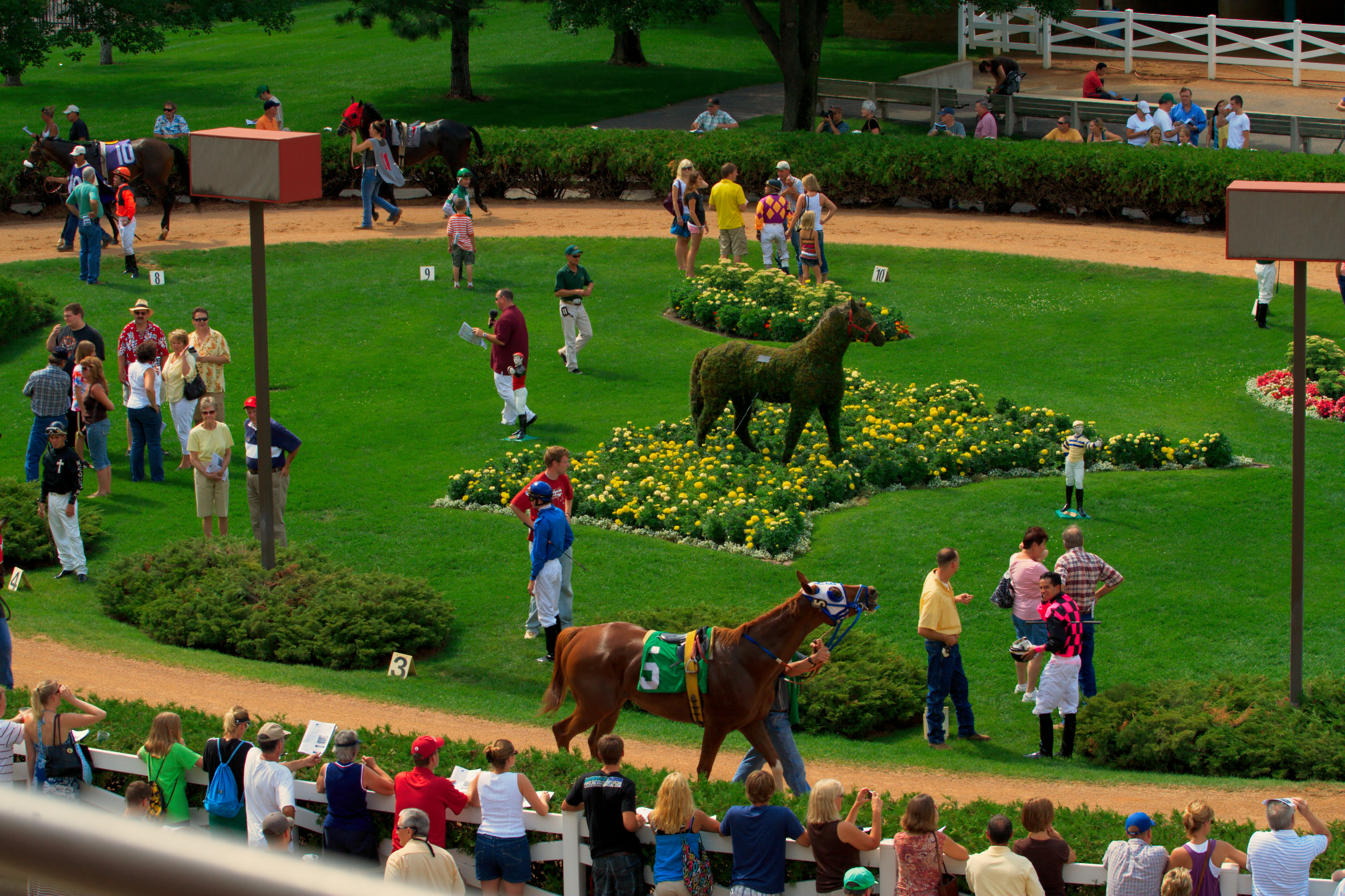
Parade ring at Canterbury Park

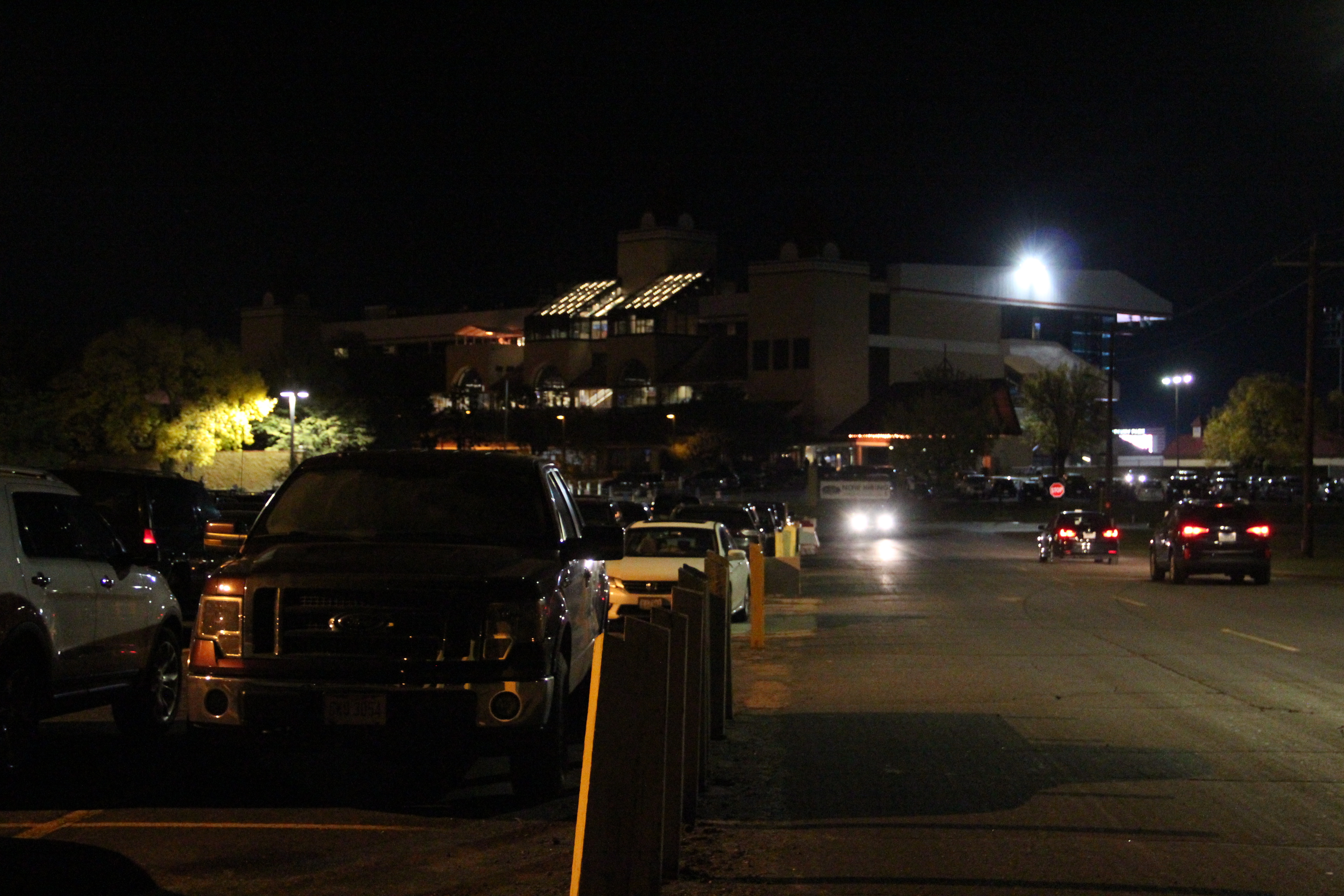
Canterbury Park at night

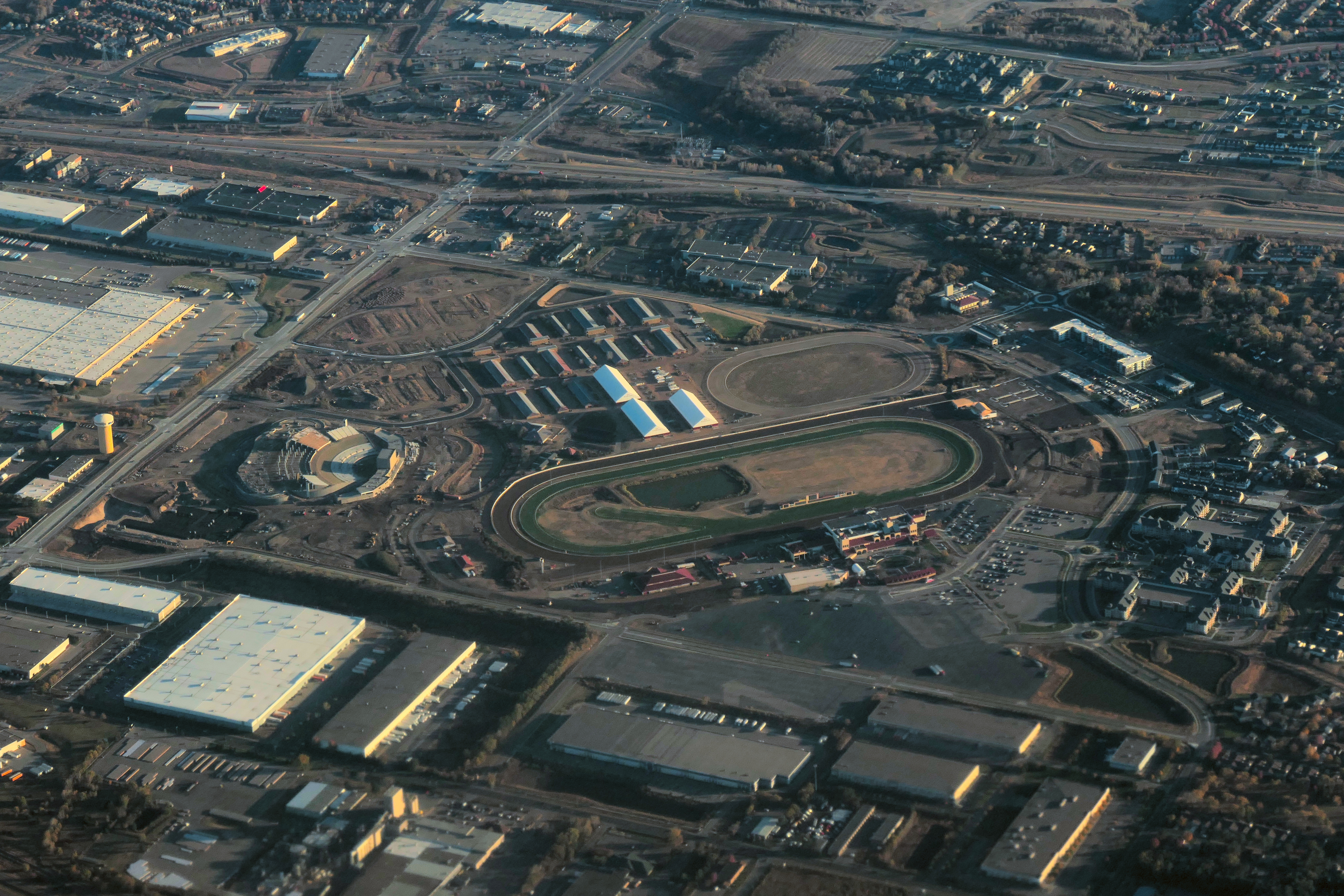
Aerial view of Canterbury Park in 2024

Canterbury Downs was founded by Walter Brooks Fields Jr. and other investors. According to David Miller of the Daily Racing Form, "Fields, along with his nephew Brooks Hauser, formed Minnesota Racetrack Inc. after a constitutional amendment allowing parimutuel wagering on horse racing was approved by Minnesota voters in 1982. Naming Santa Anita as its primary partner, Minnesota Racetrack Inc. was awarded the state's first racetrack license by the Minnesota Racing Commission, and the facility in Shakopee held its first race on June 26, 1985. In 1986 Canterbury Downs tried to do some harness racing for the 1986 racing season and did the 1986 Breeders Crown. In the 1980s, Canterbury Downs had its own newspaper, the Post Times, edited by Dan Stoneking.

The introduction of the state's lottery and the widespread growth of casino gaming at Native American-hosted facilities in the area saw Canterbury Downs business repeatedly fall below revenue projections, and the track was sold in 1990 to Ladbroke Racing PLC."

In 1990, Ladbroke Racing Corporation bought Canterbury and renamed it New Canterbury Downs. In December 1992, it closed its doors after a disastrous live racing season that saw an enormous drop in attendance. In late 1993, Canterbury was bought by Irwin L. Jacobs, who quickly sold it to Curtis and Randy Sampson. Shortly after the sale, the Sampsons worked to revitalize Canterbury, so that it reopened its doors to simulcasting, and it quickly paid off its debt. In late 1994, Canterbury carried out a promise to return live horse racing to Minnesota. In January 1995, Canterbury Downs officially changed its name to Canterbury Park.

In 1999 the legislature authorized a card room with poker tables at Canterbury Park. This had the effect of allowing poker tables at the state's Indian tribe casinos as well.

Due to the 2011 Minnesota state government shutdown, Canterbury was forced to close. Ramsey County District Judge Kathleen Gearin rejected a court case by Canterbury's owners to reopen it. Canterbury Park reopened on July 20, 2011, when the government shutdown ended.

In June 2012, Canterbury Park and the Shakopee Mdewakanton Sioux Community, owners and operators of Mystic Lake Casino, announced a 10-year cooperative marketing and purse enhancement agreement that added $75 million to horsemen purses. The deal was not renewed after it expired on December 31, 2022.

Canterbury Park also hosts corgi dog races, wiener dog races, and the annual Running of the Bulldogs.

Staff members include KFAN radio personality and Minnesota Vikings announcer Paul Allen and Minnesota Wild television commentator Kevin Gorg.

In 2019, Canterbury Park was the site of the Twin Cities Summer Jam.

Near the end of the 2023 race meet, Canterbury Park director of racing Chris Merz announced that the track would eliminate the runup for races–the distance between the placement of the starting gate and the location where timing of the race begins–in an effort to be more transparent and present a better product to gamblers with the advent of sports betting in the country. About two weeks later, Merz announced that he had resigned from Canterbury Park and a track spokesman said that the decision to eliminate the run-up would be reconsidered.

In April 2024 the Minnesota Racing Commission had approved Historic Horse Racing but was later overturned by the State of Minnesota.

In May 2026, a man was fatally shot at the Canterbury Park Expo Center during an Eid al-Adha prayer service being held there. A suspect was later charged with second-degree murder and unlawful gun possession.
