= Louis Crooks =

Louis Warden Crooks, OBE (1912–1989) was Archdeacon of Raphoe in the Province of Armagh in the Church of Ireland from 1957 until 1980.

Crooks father was also called an Anglican clergyman called Louis Warden Crooks. Crooks was educated at Campbell College and Trinity College, Dublin; and ordained in 1937. After a curacy at Templemore he was a chaplain to the Forces from 1939 to 1946. He was rector of Conwall from 1946 to 1980; and also chaplain to the Parliament of Northern Ireland.
