= Crooked Creek (North Fork Salt River tributary) =

Stream in the American state of Missouri

Coordinates: 39.5655951°N 91.9107225°W

Crooked Creek is a stream in the U.S. state of Missouri. It is a tributary of the North Fork Salt River.

Crooked Creek was so named on account of its many meanders.

== See also ==
- List of rivers of Missouri
