= J. Troutman Gougler =

American football coach (1888–1961)

Biographical details
- Born: November 5, 1888; Dauphin County, Pennsylvania, U.S.
- Died: April 23, 1961 (aged 72)

Coaching career (HC unless noted)
- 1910: Dickinson

Head coaching record
- Overall: 3–6

Jack Troutman Gougler (November 5, 1888 – April 23, 1961) was an American college football coach. He was the tenth head football coach at Dickinson College in Carlisle, Pennsylvania, serving for the first part of the 1910 season, and compiling a record of 3–6.

Gougler was unable to complete the 1910 season and was replaced part way through the season by Thomas Crooks.
