= Crookes (surname) =

Crookes is a surname. Notable people with the surname include:

- Derek Crookes (born 1969), South African cricketer
- Jason Crookes (born 1990), English rugby league player
- Joy Crookes (born 1998), British singer-songwriter
- Norman Crookes (born 1935), South African cricketer, father of Derek
- Ralph Crookes (1846–1897), English cricketer
- William Crookes (1832–1919), English chemist and physicist
