= John Crook =

John Crook may refer to:

- John Crook (ethologist) (1930–2011), British ethologist and Buddhist
- John Crook (conductor) (1847–1922), English conductor and composer
- John Crook (politician) (1895–1970), Australian politician
- John Crook (bishop) (born 1940), Bishop of Moray, Ross and Caithness, 1999–2006
- John Crook (classicist) (1921–2007)

== See also ==
- John Crooke (disambiguation)
- John Crooks (disambiguation)
