= Lee Crooks (voice actor) =

American voice actor

- Born: 1960 (age 65–66); Wausau, Wisconsin
- Occupations: Voice actor, audio engineer
- Known for: Voice of overhead announcements on the Chicago "L"

Lee Crooks (born 1960) is an American voice actor best known for his work with the Chicago Transit Authority.

Lee Crooks grew up in Wausau, Wisconsin. He was heavily involved with music in high school. He attended the University of Wisconsin–Stevens Point at Wausau, then transferred to the Berklee College of Music in Boston to study guitar. He returned to his home state of Wisconsin further study at the Wisconsin Conservatory of Music.

Crooks did not finish college. He worked as a roadie for a few years for a friend's band, then went to Ohio to become an audio engineer. He then started Breezeway Recording Studio in Waukesha, Wisconsin. In the late 1980s, Crooks sold the studio but continued working there as an audio engineer. After years of working as an audio engineer, he went into voice acting. He started taking lessons from a voice coach in Chicago in 1989.

In the 1990s, the Chicago Transit Authority (CTA) started looking for a voice actor to do overhead announcements on buses and trains. Previously, train conductors had made the announcements while driving. Their voices were often muffled and difficult for passengers to hear. Crooks auditioned for the role in 1997. He had just visited Disney World with his family, and he was inspired by the announcer's voice on the monorail. His voice went live on the "L" in 2000 and on CTA buses in 2003.

As of 2023, Crooks still commutes to Chicago to record updates to the overhead announcement system. He notes that his voice has deepened with age, making it difficult at times to match the original 1998 announcement voice. Crooks has been nicknamed the "voice of the CTA."

Crooks also does voiceovers for commercials, audiobooks, documentaries, technical training videos, and Buffalo Metro Rail in Buffalo, New York.

Crooks lives in the Milwaukee suburbs with his family. He is married with children and a grandchild.
