= Richard M. Crooks =

American material chemist

Richard M. Crooks is an American material chemist, currently the Robert A. Welch Foundation Chair of Materials Chemistry at the University of Texas at Austin.
