= Tony Crook =

Tony Crook may refer to:

- Tony Crook (politician) (born 1959), Australian politician
- Tony Crook (racing driver) (1920–2014), English racing driver
- Tony Crook (town planner) (1944–2024), British academic and emeritus professor of town and regional planning
