= John Crookes =

English cricketer

Personal information
- Full name: John Edward Crookes
- Born: 7 March 1890; Horncastle, Lincolnshire, England
- Died: 8 September 1948 (aged 58); Cuddington, Surrey, England
- Batting: Right-handed
- Bowling: Unknown

Domestic team information
- Years: Team
- 1909–1910: Lincolnshire
- 1920: Hampshire

Career statistics
Competition	First-class
Matches	3
Runs scored	50
Batting average	12.50
100s/50s	–/–
Top score	36*
Balls bowled	6
Wickets	0
Bowling average	–
5 wickets in innings	–
10 wickets in match	–
Best bowling	–
Catches/stumpings	3/–
- Source: Cricinfo, 6 January 2010

John Edward Crookes (7 March 1890 – 8 September 1948) was an English first-class cricketer.

Crookes was born in March 1890 at Horncastle, Lincolnshire. He played minor counties cricket for Lincolnshire in 1909 and 1910, making ten appearances in the Minor Counties Championship. He served in the British Army during the First World War, as a sergeant major. Following the war, he played first-class cricket for Hampshire in three matches in the 1920 County Championship, against Warwickshire, Worcestershire, and Somerset. In these, he scored 50 runs with a highest score of 36 not out. Crookes died in September 1948 at Cuddington, Surrey.
