= Billy Crook (English footballer) =

English footballer

Personal information
- Full name: William Charles Crook
- Date of birth: 7 June 1926
- Place of birth: Wolverhampton, England
- Date of death: 29 May 2011 (aged 84)
- Position: Wing half

Youth career
- Boulton & Paul's
- 1940–1943: Wolverhampton Wanderers

Senior career*
Years	Team	Apps	(Gls)
1943–1954	Wolverhampton Wanderers	196	(2)
1954–1956	Walsall	45	(2)
1956–1960	Wellington Town	-	(-)
- * Club domestic league appearances and goals

William Charles Crook (7 June 1926 – 29 May 2011) was an English footballer who spent the majority of his playing career at Wolverhampton Wanderers, with whom he won the 1949 FA Cup.

== Career ==
Crook first joined Wolverhampton Wanderers in August 1940 aged 14, eventually signed professional forms three years later. He made his debut in a League War Cup tie on 10 January 1942 against Blackpool, en route to lifting the trophy. He made 121 wartime appearances for the club in total, as well as guesting for Aldershot and Chelsea.

He became a regular first team player when league football recommenced in 1946, and held his place over the next six seasons. He was part of the team that lifted the FA Cup in 1949, beating Leicester City 3–1 at Wembley. However, Crook lost his place in the 1952–53 season to Ron Flowers and left for Walsall in October 1954.

He spent two seasons in the Third Division with the Saddlers then dropped into the non-league with Wellington Town before retiring in 1960 aged 34.

After giving up the game, he worked as a structural draughtsman for an engineering company in Darlaston, a role he had already held part-time during his playing days.

== Honours ==
Wolverhampton Wanderers

- FA Cup: 1948–49
- Football League War Cup: 1942
- FA Charity Shield: 1949 (shared)
