= Peter Crook (businessman) =

- Born: Peter Stuart Crook; July 1963 (age 63)
- Education: Loughborough University; Cranfield University
- Title: Former CEO, Provident Financial
- Term: -August 2017
- Children: 4

Peter Stuart Crook was the chief executive of Provident Financial until August 2017.

Peter Stuart Crook was born in July 1963. He graduated from Loughborough University with a BSc in Economics in 1985, and completed an MBA at Cranfield University in 1996.

In 2005, Crook joined Provident Financial as financial MD of its consumer credit division.

Crook has four children and lives in Northamptonshire.
