= A. R. Crook =

American scientist and academic

- Born: Alja Robinson Crook; June 17, 1864; Circleville, Ohio
- Died: May 31, 1930 (aged 65); Springfield, Illinois
- Occupation: Geologist

Alja Robinson Crook (June 17, 1864 – May 31, 1930) was an American scientist and academic from Ohio. Crook attended Ohio Wesleyan University and received a Dr. phil. in Munich, Germany in 1892. He was a professor of mineralogy and economic geology at Northwestern University from 1893 to 1906, when he was named Illinois State Geologist. As state geologist, he greatly expanded the state museum.

== Biography ==
Alja Robinson Crook was born in Circleville, Ohio, on June 17, 1864. His father Isaac was a Methodist minister. Crook attended Ohio Wesleyan University, graduating in 1887. He studied abroad in the following years, attaining a Dr. Phil. at Ludwig-Maximilians-Universität München (LMU) in 1892. He returned to Illinois and taught at Wheaton College for a year. Crook then accepted a position at Northwestern University as a professor of mineralogy and economic geology.

Crook taught at Northwestern until September 15, 1906, when he was named Illinois State Geologist by Charles S. Deneen. This made him curator of the Illinois State Museum, which at the time was no more than a room in the state arsenal building. Crook greatly expanded the museum, moving it to the Centrannial Building on the Illinois State Fairgrounds. Crook wrote The Guide to Mineral Collection, which was a popular text in colleges in museums. From 1914 to 1915, he was the president of the Illinois Academy of Science. He remained in this position until his death.

Crook married Florence Wayne Purdum; they had five children. An active Methodist, he was the vice president of the Illinois Sunday School association and was president of the Illinois conference of the Methodist Episcopal Layman's association. He was also a fellow of the American Association for the Advancement of Science and a member of Sigma Xi. A. R. Crook died on May 31, 1930, in Springfield, Illinois. He was buried there in Roselawn Memorial Park, though a marker for him is instead found in Oak Ridge Cemetery.
