= Thomas Crook Sullivan =

United States Army general

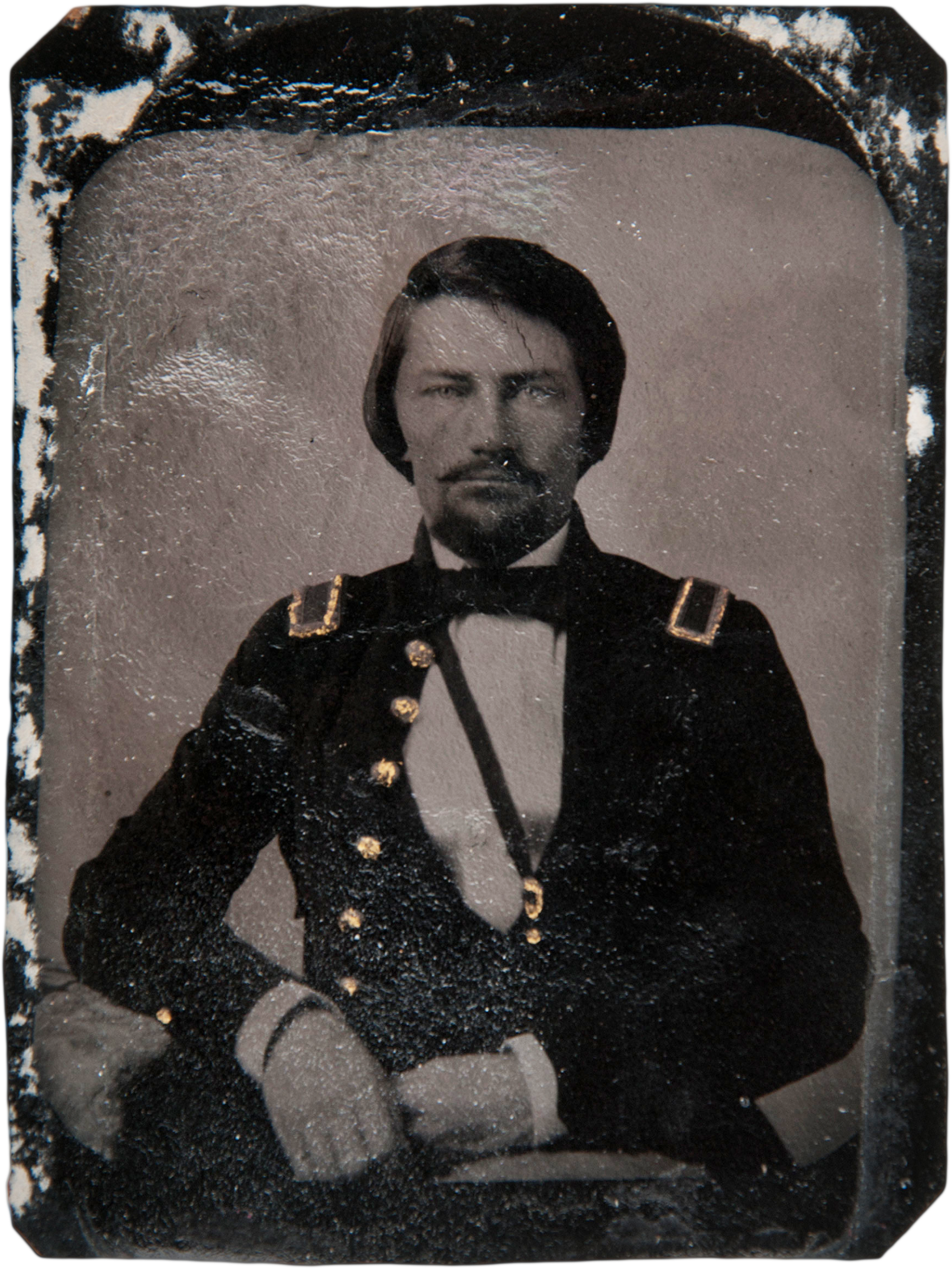
- General Sullivan
- Born: November 14, 1833; Montgomery County, Ohio
- Died: March 11, 1908 (aged 74); Fortress Monroe, Virginia

Thomas Crook Sullivan (November 14, 1833 – March 11, 1908) was a brigadier general in the United States Army.

Sullivan was born at Montgomery County, Ohio, the son of Samuel Sullivan, the proprietor of Sullivan's Tavern, the brother of Ohio 2nd Dist Appellate Judge Theodore Sullivan, and the nephew of future Major General George Crook via older sister Maria Crook Sullivan. He graduated from West Point in 1856, ranking twelfth in a class of forty-nine. His first assignment was as a second lieutenant in the 1st U.S. Artillery Regiment serving on the Texas frontier and during this period was with the expedition against Juan Cortina's Mexican marauders, seeing combat near Fort Brown, Texas. He was later ordered to Washington (D.C.), arriving in the Winter of 1861, and selected as a guard for president-elect Abraham Lincoln during his first inauguration.

He served throughout the American Civil War and was brevetted major and lieutenant colonel on March 13, 1865, for "faithful and meritorious service".

He remained in the army following the war, mainly in supply and subsistence roles until he retired on November 14, 1897, as Commissary General of Subsistence.

He died at the Hotel Chamberlain, Fort Monroe, Virginia, aged seventy-four. The entire garrison of officers and enlisted men turned out and gave honors and services while his remains lay in state at Fortress Monroe chapel. His cremated remains were later buried in Section one of Arlington National Cemetery. He is buried in one of only two mausoleums in Arlington, the other being that of Lieutenant General Nelson Appleton Miles in Section 3.
