= Baron Crook =

Barony in the Peerage of the United Kingdom

Baron Crook, of Carshalton in the County of Surrey, is a title in the Peerage of the United Kingdom. It was created on 3 July 1947 for Reginald Crook, later Chairman of the National Dock Labour Board. As of 2010 the title is held by his grandson, the third Baron, who succeeded his father in 2001.

== Barons Crook (1947) ==
- Reginald Douglas Crook, 1st Baron Crook (1901–1989)
- Douglas Edwin Crook, 2nd Baron Crook (1926–2001)
- Robert Douglas Edwin Crook, 3rd Baron Crook (b. 1955)

The heir apparent is the present holder's son Hon. Matthew Robert Crook (b. 1990)

== Arms ==
Coat of arms of Baron Crook
Crest Two shepherds’ crooks in saltire Or surmounted by a Tudor rose barbed and seeded Proper. Escutcheon Or on a bend Vert between in chief two Tudor roses barbed and seeded Proper and in base a sprig of oak slipped and fructed of the second a shepherd’s crook of the field. Supporters On the dexter side an antelope gorged with a chaplet of Tudor roses barbed and seeded Proper and on the sinister side a greyhound Argent gorged with a collar Or thereon three cross crosslets and with line reflexed over the back Gules. Motto Crux Scutum
