= Mystic Lake Casino Hotel =

Casino hotel in Minnesota

Coordinates: 44°43′51″N 93°28′25″W

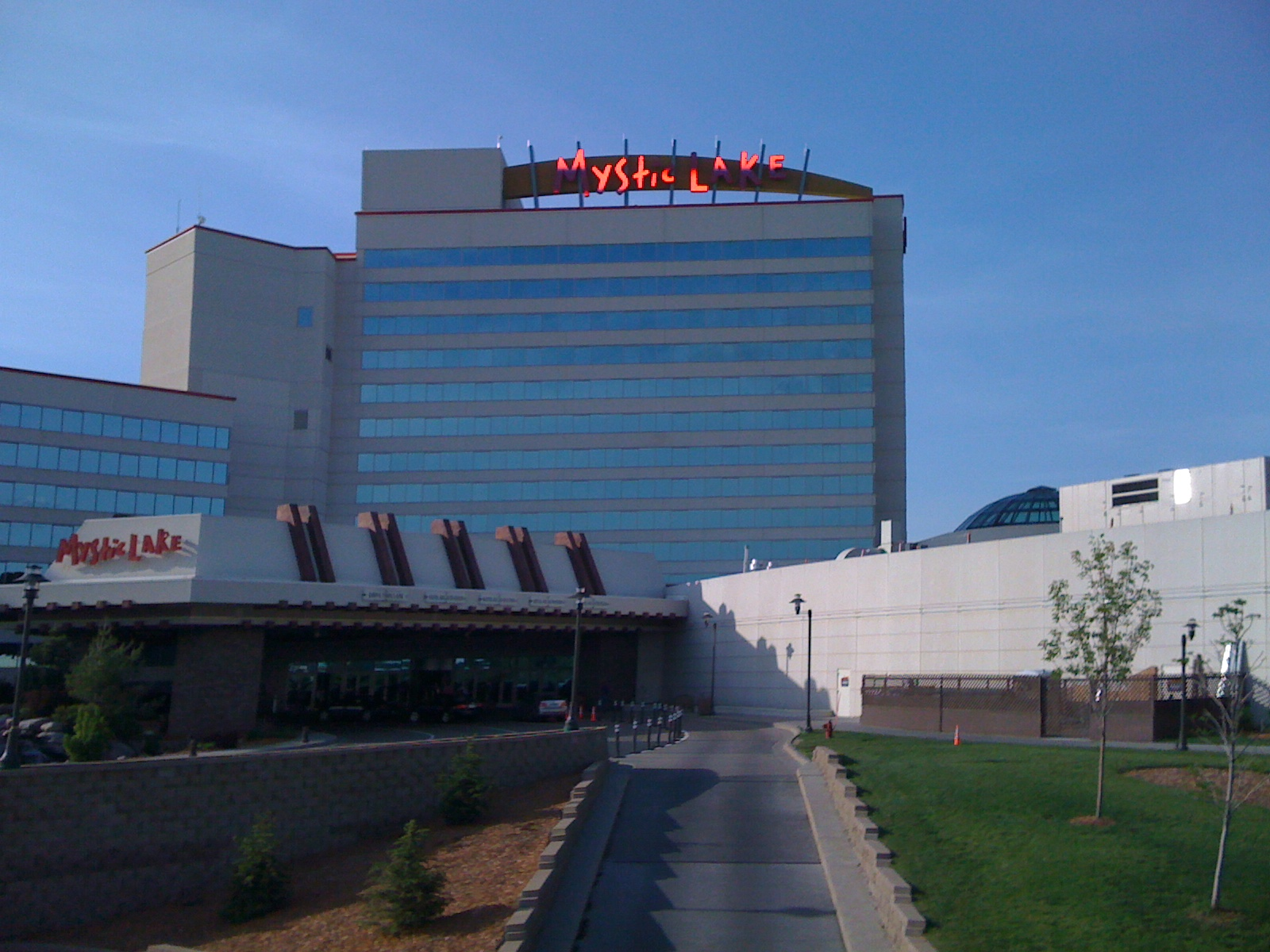
Mystic Lake Casino in 2010

Mystic Lake Casino Hotel is owned and operated by the Shakopee Mdewakanton Sioux Community (SMSC) in Prior Lake, Minnesota, United States, southwest of Minneapolis and Saint Paul. With 4,100 employees, the SMSC—including Mystic Lake Casino Hotel and Little Six Casino—is Scott County's largest employer. The casino's gambling options include slots, bingo, video roulette, pulltabs, and live dealer blackjack. Mystic Lake also offers bars, restaurants, shows, special events, and accommodations.

== History ==
Mystic Lake Casino Hotel is owned and operated by the Shakopee Mdewakanton Sioux Community (SMSC), a federally recognized, sovereign Indian tribe.

The SMSC opened Little Six Bingo in 1982, which became Little Six Casino in 1990 upon the passage of the federal Indian Gaming Regulatory Act of 1988 and the signing of a gaming compact between the SMSC and the State of Minnesota. The SMSC and other Minnesota tribes were the first in the United States to negotiate and sign tribal-state compacts with a state government related to gaming.

Mystic Lake Casino Hotel opened on May 12, 1992. It is named after the nearby lake of the same name. Its success has helped fund SMSC goals, including economic diversification and improvements to tribal infrastructure and services.

In 2012 the SMSC initiated a 10-year cooperative agreement with Canterbury Park in neighboring Shakopee to support increased purses for live horseraces and joint marketing opportunities. In 2013, the first full racing season under the agreement, Canterbury Park completed its longest season since 2006, with a purse distribution double the amount paid out to horse owners in 2011.

In 2018 Mystic Lake Center opened, the newest addition to Mystic Lake Casino Hotel.

With 766 hotel rooms, Mystic Lake Casino Hotel is one of the Minneapolis–Saint Paul metropolitan area's largest hotels.

In 2025, the SMSC entered into a naming rights agreement with venue operator Live Nation Entertainment for a new 19,000-seat outdoor concert venue being constructed adjacent to nearby Canterbury Park. The new amphitheater was named Mystic Lake Amphitheater and opened on June 20, 2026.

== Awards ==
The SMSC Gaming Enterprise, which includes Mystic Lake and Little Six, received "Best Places to Work" awards from the Minneapolis-Saint Paul Business Journal in 2012 and 2013, and a "Top 100 Workplaces" award from the Minnesota Star Tribune in 2013.
