= 1910 Western Conference football season =

- Sport: Football
- Champion: Illinois & Minnesota

Football seasons
- 1909 1911

1910 Western Conference football standings
	Conf.					Overall
Team	W		L		T	W		L		T
Illinois +	4	–	0	–	0	7	–	0	–	0
Minnesota +	2	–	0	–	0	6	–	1	–	0
Indiana	3	–	1	–	0	5	–	1	–	0
Iowa	1	–	1	–	0	5	–	2	–	0
Wisconsin	1	–	2	–	1	1	–	2	–	2
Northwestern	1	–	2	–	1	1	–	3	–	1
Chicago	2	–	4	–	0	2	–	5	–	0
Purdue	0	–	4	–	0	1	–	5	–	0
+ – Conference co-champions

The 1910 Western Conference football season was the fifteenth season of college football played by the member schools of the Western Conference (later known as the Big Ten Conference) and was a part of the 1910 college football season.

== Season overview ==
Illinois and Minnesota were declared co-champions after posting undefeated conference records of 4-0 and 2–0, respectively. Illinois finished their season undefeated at 7–0 overall, while Minnesota ended up at 6–1, their lone loss coming in the Little Brown Jug game.

Indiana finished in third at 5–1 overall, 3–1 in league play. Iowa, Wisconsin, and Northwestern acquired one conference win all season, although Iowa's overall 5–2 record was stronger than Wisconsin's 1-2-2 mark and Northwestern's 1-3-1 season.

Chicago ended up at 2-5 (2-4 WC), while Purdue went winless in the league at 0-4 and 1–5 overall. Their lone victory was a home game win over DePauw.

=== Illinois ===
Date	Opponent	Site	Result	Source
October 1	Millikin*	Illinois Field; Champaign, IL	W 11–0	
October 8	Drake*	Illinois Field; Champaign, IL	W 29–0	
October 15	Chicago	Illinois Field; Champaign, IL	W 3–0	
October 29	at Purdue	Stuart Field; West Lafayette, IN (rivalry)	W 11–0	
November 5	at Indiana	Jordan Field; Bloomington, IN (rivalry)	W 3–0	
November 12	at Northwestern	Northwestern Field; Evanston, IL (rivalry)	W 27–0	
November 19	Syracuse*	Illinois Field; Champaign, IL	W 3–0	
*Non-conference game

=== Minnesota ===
Date	Opponent	Site	Result	Attendance
September 24	Lawrence*	Northrop Field; Minneapolis, MN	W 34–0	4,000
October 1	South Dakota*	Northrop Field; Minneapolis, MN	W 17–0	5,000
October 8	Iowa State*	Northrop Field; Minneapolis, MN	W 49–0	8,000
October 15	Nebraska*	Northrop Field; Minneapolis, MN (rivalry)	W 27–0	15,000
October 29	at Chicago	Marshall Field; Chicago, IL	W 24–0	
November 12	Wisconsin	Northrop Field; Minneapolis, MN (rivalry)	W 28–0	18,000
November 19	at Michigan*	Ferry Field; Ann Arbor, MI (Little Brown Jug)	L 0–6	18,000
*Non-conference game

=== Indiana ===
Date	Opponent	Site	Result	Source
October 1	DePauw*	Jordan Field; Bloomington, IN	W 12–0	
October 8	at Chicago	Marshall Field; Chicago, IL	W 6–0	
October 15	Millikin*	Jordan Field; Bloomington, IN	W 34–0	
October 22	vs. Wisconsin	Washington Park; Indianapolis, IN	W 12–3	
October 29	Butler*	Jordan Field; Bloomington, IN	W 33–0	
November 5	Illinois	Jordan Field; Bloomington, IN (rivalry)	L 0–3	
November 19	at Purdue	Stuart Field; West Lafayette, IN (rivalry)	W 15–0	
*Non-conference game

=== Iowa ===
Date	Time	Opponent	Site	Result	Attendance	Source
October 4		Morningside*	Iowa Field; Iowa City, IA	W 12–0		
October 8		at Northwestern	Northwestern Field; Evanston, IL	L 5–10		
October 15		at Missouri	Rollins Field; Columbia, MO	L 0–5		
October 22		Purdue	Iowa Field; Iowa City, IA	W 16–0		
November 5		at Iowa State	State Field; Ames, IA (rivalry)	W 2–0		
November 12		Drake	Iowa Field; Iowa City, IA	W 21–0		
November 19	2:45 p.m.	at Washington University	Francis Field; St. Louis, MO	W 38–0	2,000	
*Non-conference game

=== Wisconsin ===
Date	Opponent	Site	Result	Attendance
October 8	Lawrence*	Randall Field; Madison, WI	T 6–6	
October 22	vs. Indiana	Washington Park; Indianapolis, IN	L 3–12	
October 29	Northwestern	Randall Field; Madison, WI	T 0–0	
November 12	at Minnesota	Northrop Field; Minneapolis, MN (rivalry)	L 0–28	18,000
November 19	Chicago^{†}	Randall Field; Madison, WI	W 10–0	
*Non-conference game; ^{†}Homecoming

=== Northwestern ===
Date	Opponent	Site	Result	Source
October 1	Illinois Wesleyan	Northwestern Field; Evanston, IL	L 0–3	
October 8	Iowa	Northwestern Field; Evanston, IL	W 10–5	
October 22	at Chicago	Marshall Field; Chicago, IL	L 0–10	
October 29	at Wisconsin	Randall Field; Madison, WI	T 0–0	
November 12	Illinois	Northwestern Field; Evanston, IL (rivalry)	L 0–27	

=== Chicago ===
Date	Opponent	Site	Result	Source
October 8	Indiana	Marshall Field; Chicago, IL	L 0–6	
October 15	at Illinois	Illinois Field; Champaign, IL	L 0–3	
October 22	Northwestern	Marshall Field; Chicago, IL	W 10–0	
October 29	Minnesota	Marshall Field; Chicago, IL	L 0–24	
November 5	Purdue	Marshall Field; Chicago, IL (rivalry)	W 14–5	
November 12	at Cornell*	Percy Field; Ithaca, NY	L 0–18	
November 19	at Wisconsin	Randall Field; Madison, WI	L 0–10	
*Non-conference game

=== Purdue ===
Date	Opponent	Site	Result	Attendance	Source
October 8	Wabash*	Stuart Field; West Lafayette, IN	L 0–3		
October 22	at Iowa	Iowa Field; Iowa City, IA	L 0–16		
October 29	Illinois	Stuart Field; West Lafayette, IN (rivalry)	L 0–11		
November 5	at Chicago	Stagg Field; Chicago, IL (rivalry)	L 5–14		
November 12	DePauw*	Stuart Field; West Lafayette, IN	W 14–6		
November 19	Indiana	West Lafayette, IN (Old Oaken Bucket)	L 0–15		
*Non-conference game

=== Bowl games ===
No Western Conference schools participated in any bowl games during the 1910 season.
