= 1911 Western Conference football season =

- Sport: Football
- Champion: Minnesota

Football seasons
- ← 1910 1912 →

1911 Western Conference football standings
| | Conf. | | | | | Overall |
| Team | W | | L | | T | W | | L | | T |
|---|---|---|---|---|---|---|---|---|---|---|
| Minnesota $ | 3 | – | 0 | – | 1 | 6 | – | 0 | – | 1 |
| Chicago | 5 | – | 1 | – | 0 | 6 | – | 1 | – | 0 |
| Wisconsin | 2 | – | 1 | – | 1 | 5 | – | 1 | – | 1 |
| Illinois | 2 | – | 2 | – | 1 | 4 | – | 2 | – | 1 |
| Iowa | 2 | – | 2 | – | 0 | 3 | – | 4 | – | 0 |
| Purdue | 1 | – | 3 | – | 0 | 3 | – | 4 | – | 0 |
| Northwestern | 1 | – | 4 | – | 0 | 3 | – | 4 | – | 0 |
| Indiana | 0 | – | 3 | – | 1 | 3 | – | 3 | – | 1 |
$ – Conference champion

The 1911 Western Conference football season was the sixteenth season of college football played by the member schools of the Western Conference (later known as the Big Ten Conference) and was a part of the 1911 college football season.

== Season overview ==
At 3-0-1 in conference play and 6-0-1 overall, Minnesota was declared Western Conference champions. In their 12th year under head coach Henry L. Williams, the Golden Gophers outscored their opponents by a combined total of 102 to 15. The team was also recognized retroactively as the national champion by the Billingsley Report.

Chicago rebounded from last year's seventh-place finish to go 6-0-1 (5-1), their lone loss coming to the Golden Gophers. Wisconsin went 5-1-1 (2-1-1), which included a tie to the eventual National Champions. They were followed closely by Illinois at 4-2-1 (2-2-1) and Iowa at 3-4 (1-3).

Purdue and Northwestern both ended with overall records of 3-4, but the Boilermakers had a conference record of 1-3 compared to the Purple's 1-4 WC mark.

Indiana finished at 3-3-1 overall but went winless in the conference at 0-3-1.

=== Minnesota ===
| Date | Time | Opponent | Site | Result | Attendance | Source |
|---|---|---|---|---|---|---|
| September 30 | | Iowa State* | Northrop Field; Minneapolis, MN | W 5–0 | 3,000 | |
| October 7 | 3:00 p.m. | South Dakota* | Northrop Field; Minneapolis, MN | W 5–0 | 3,500 | |
| October 21 | | Nebraska* | Northrop Field; Minneapolis, MN (rivalry) | W 21–3 | 10,000 | |
| October 28 | | Iowa | Northrop Field; Minneapolis, MN (rivalry) | W 24–6 | 5,000 | |
| November 4 | | Chicago | Northrop Field; Minneapolis, MN | W 30–0 | 20,000 | |
| November 18 | | at Wisconsin | Randall Field; Madison, WI (rivalry) | T 6–6 | 15,000 | |
| November 25 | | at Illinois | Illinois Field; Champaign, IL | W 11–0 | 10,000 | |
*Non-conference game

=== Chicago ===
| Date | Opponent | Site | Result | Attendance | Source |
|---|---|---|---|---|---|
| October 7 | Indiana | Marshall Field; Chicago, IL | W 23–6 | | |
| October 14 | Purdue | Marshall Field; Chicago, IL (rivalry) | W 11–3 | | |
| October 21 | Illinois | Marshall Field; Chicago, IL | W 24–0 | | |
| November 4 | at Minnesota | Northrop Field; Minneapolis, MN | L 0–30 | 20,000 | |
| November 11 | at Northwestern | Northwestern Field; Evanston, IL | W 9–3 | | |
| November 18 | Cornell* | Marshall Field; Chicago, IL | W 6–0 | | |
| November 25 | Wisconsin | Marshall Field; Chicago, IL | W 5–0 | | |
*Non-conference game

=== Wisconsin ===
| Date | Opponent | Site | Result | Attendance | Source |
|---|---|---|---|---|---|
| October 7 | Lawrence* | Randall Field; Madison, WI | W 15–0 | | |
| October 14 | Ripon* | Randall Field; Madison, WI | W 24–0 | | |
| October 21 | Colorado College* | Randall Field; Madison, WI | W 26–0 | | |
| October 28 | at Northwestern | Northwestern Field; Evanston, IL | W 28–3 | | |
| November 4 | Iowa | Randall Field; Madison, WI (rivalry) | W 12–0 | | |
| November 18 | Minnesota^{†} | Randall Field; Madison, WI (rivalry) | T 6–6 | 15,000 | |
| November 25 | at Chicago | Marshall Field; Chicago, IL | L 0–5 | | |
*Non-conference game; ^{†}Homecoming

=== Illinois ===
| Date | Opponent | Site | Result | Attendance | Source |
|---|---|---|---|---|---|
| October 7 | Millikin* | Illinois Field; Champaign, IL | W 33–0 | | |
| October 14 | Saint Louis* | Illinois Field; Champaign, IL | W 9–0 | | |
| October 21 | at Chicago | Marshall Field; Chicago, IL | L 0–24 | | |
| November 4 | Purdue | Illinois Field; Champaign, IL (rivalry) | W 12–3 | | |
| November 11 | vs. Indiana | Jordan Field; Indianapolis, IN (rivalry) | T 0–0 | | |
| November 18 | Northwestern | Illinois Field; Champaign, IL (rivalry) | W 27–13 | | |
| November 25 | Minnesota | Illinois Field; Champaign, IL | L 0–11 | 10,000 | |
*Non-conference game

=== Iowa ===
| Date | Opponent | Site | Result | Attendance | Source |
|---|---|---|---|---|---|
| October 14 | Morningside* | Iowa Field; Iowa City, IA | W 11–5 | | |
| October 21 | Cornell (IA)* | Iowa Field; Iowa City, IA | L 0–3 | | |
| October 28 | at Minnesota | Northrop Field; Minneapolis, MN (rivalry) | L 6–24 | 5,000 | |
| November 4 | at Wisconsin | Randall Field; Madison, WI (rivalry) | L 0–12 | | |
| November 11 | at Purdue | Stuart Field; West Lafayette, IN | W 11–0 | | |
| November 18 | Iowa State* | Iowa Field; Iowa City, IA (rivalry) | L 0–9 | | |
| November 25 | Northwestern | Iowa Field; Iowa City, IA | W 6–0 | | |
*Non-conference game

=== Purdue ===
| Date | Opponent | Site | Result | Source |
|---|---|---|---|---|
| October 8 | Wabash* | Stuart Field; West Lafayette, IN | L 0–3 | |
| October 15 | at Chicago | Stagg Field; Chicago, IL (rivalry) | L 3–11 | |
| October 28 | DePauw* | Stuart Field; West Lafayette, IN | W 5–0 | |
| November 4 | at Illinois | Illinois Field; Champaign, IL (rivalry) | L 3–12 | |
| November 11 | Iowa | Stuart Field; West Lafayette, IN | L 0–11 | |
| November 18 | Rose Polytechnic* | Stuart Field; West Lafayette, IN | W 35–6 | |
| November 25 | at Indiana | Jordan Field; Bloomington, IN (Old Oaken Bucket) | W 12–5 | |
*Non-conference game

=== Northwestern ===
| Date | Opponent | Site | Result | Source |
|---|---|---|---|---|
| October 7 | Monmouth (IL)* | Northwestern Field; Evanston, IL | W 26–0 | |
| October 14 | Illinois Wesleyan* | Northwestern Field; Evanston, IL | W 10–0 | |
| October 21 | Indiana | Northwestern Field; Evanston, IL | W 5–0 | |
| October 28 | Wisconsin | Northwestern Field; Evanston, IL | L 3–28 | |
| November 11 | Chicago | Northwestern Field; Evanston, IL | L 3–9 | |
| November 18 | at Illinois | Illinois Field; Champaign, IL (rivalry) | L 13–27 | |
| November 25 | at Iowa | Iowa Field; Iowa City, IA | L 0–6 | |
*Non-conference game

=== Indiana ===
| Date | Opponent | Site | Result | Attendance | Source |
|---|---|---|---|---|---|
| September 30 | DePauw* | Jordan Field; Bloomington, IN | W 9–6 | | |
| October 7 | at Chicago | Marshall Field; Chicago, IL | L 6–23 | | |
| October 14 | Franklin (IN)* | Jordan Field; Bloomington, IN | W 42–0 | | |
| October 21 | at Northwestern | Northwestern Field; Evanston, IL | L 0–5 | | |
| October 28 | Washington University* | Jordan Field; Bloomington, IN | W 12–0 | 3,000 | |
| November 11 | vs. Illinois | Indianapolis, IN (rivalry) | T 0–0 | | |
| November 25 | Purdue | Jordan Field; Bloomington, IN (rivalry) | L 5–12 | | |
*Non-conference game

=== Bowl games ===
No Western Conference schools participated in any bowl games during the 1911 season.
