= History of Iowa Hawkeyes football =

History of the Iowa Hawkeyes football team.

The Iowa Hawkeyes Football team was founded as a club team in 1872 and was officially recognized as a varsity team in 1889. They have won 13 conference titles and 5 national titles.

== Overview ==
=== Early history (1889–1978) ===
The State University of Iowa began playing football as a club sport in 1872, with intramural games against other colleges played as early as 1882. It was not until 1889 that Iowa challenged Grinnell College, then-known as Iowa College, to a game of football. On November 16, 1889; the two teams met in Grinnell, Iowa to play the first game of intercollegiate football in the state of Iowa and the first one west of the Mississippi River. Iowa lost, 24–0, and a rematch between the two teams in Iowa City was canceled due to poor weather. A stone marker still stands in Grinnell Field marking the event.

The next season, Iowa once again played Grinnell, this time in Iowa City in its first home game on Iowa Field. Playing in rain and strong winds, the Hawkeyes lost 14–6, but scored the first touchdown in school history when Martin Sampson blocked a Grinnell kick and returned it 70 yards for the score. However, much displeasure was expressed with this second loss to the Pioneers. The S.U.I. Medics, angry with two straight losses to a "small academy", challenged the varsity team to a game in an attempt to prove that Iowa's team was not composed of the best players available. Confident of their victory, the varsity team accepted, but lost 22–10. The loss brought in multiple changes in personnel and strategy, but it did not deter Iowa from challenging Iowa Wesleyan College to a game. In Mount Pleasant, Iowa, the Hawkeyes scored 19 touchdowns, and rolled to the first victory in school history by score of 91–0.

In 1891, Iowa won three of its five games to finish with the first winning season in school history. In the following years, Iowa began hiring head coaches to assemble and prepare the team before the season, the first being E. A. Dalton of Princeton University, who was hired for ten days before the 1892 season. Following a two-week tenure by Ben Donnelly in 1893, Iowa hired Roger Sherman, who became the first coach to lead the Hawkeyes for the entire season in 1894.

In 1895, however, Iowa decided to forgo hiring a head coach to save money, and limped to a 2–5 record under the volunteer efforts of Bill Larrabee. For the last time in school history, the Hawkeyes had gone without a head coach. The following year, Iowa hired Alfred E. Bull of Penn as the next coach of the Hawkeyes. Under the leadership of one of the greatest centers to date, the Hawkeyes finished with a 7–1–1 record and won the conference championship in the Western Interstate University Football Association (WIUFA). Controversy, however, sparked in Iowa's game against the Missouri Tigers. Missouri alumni demanded that the Hawkeyes play the game without Frank Holbrook, Iowa's star black athlete. Iowa refused, and won the game 12–0, amid a hostile crowd in Columbia, Missouri. Holbrook was one of the two players to score a touchdown during the game. Following Bull's tenure, Iowa hired Otto Wagonhurst, the last Hawkeye coach until John G. Griffith in 1909 to lead the team for only one season.

Alden Knipe coached the team in 1898, and Knipe was the first Iowa football coach ever rehired for a second season in 1899. The 1899 Hawkeyes posted an 8–0–1 record, tying only 1899 Western Conference champion Chicago. The one field goal allowed to Chicago were the only points scored on Iowa all year. Iowa's success that season led to an invitation for membership in the Western Conference, now known as the Big Ten Conference, beginning in 1900.

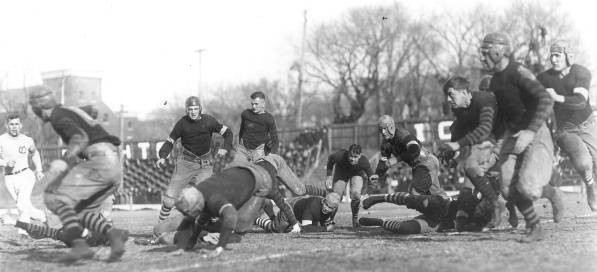
Iowa plays Nebraska on November 25, 1916.

Coach Alden Knipe, back for a third season in 1900, led the Hawks to a 7–0–1 record and a share of the Western Conference title in Iowa's first year in the league. For the second straight season, Iowa did not yield a touchdown. From 1898 to 1901, Iowa would establish a streak of 23 straight games both without a defeat and without allowing a touchdown. Alden Knipe, who was also Iowa's first director of athletics, retired from coaching after the 1902 season, and Iowa would struggle in the Western Conference for the rest of the decade. Before the 1910 season, school officials hired Jesse Hawley of Dartmouth as head football coach and Nelson A. Kellogg as athletic director, separating the job into two different positions for the first time. Hawley was a brilliant offensive coach, and some of Iowa's wins under Hawley are among the most lopsided in school history. The 1913 Hawkeyes led the nation in scoring by a wide margin, averaging over 44 points per game. Iowa's only conference loss that year was to Western Conference champion Chicago; it was the first time since 1900 that Iowa seriously challenged for the league title. In 1914, the Hawkeyes defeated Northern Iowa 95–0, the largest margin of victory in school history. When Iowa lost its last four games in 1915, criticism of Hawley mounted. In particular, many talented native Iowans were star players elsewhere. Eleven of the best players in the Western Conference were native Iowans playing for other league schools. Further, Hawley only lived in Iowa City during the season, and Iowa wanted a full-time coach. Coach Hawley left after the 1915 season, and Iowa offered Howard Jones of Yale a five-year contract to replace him.

The Jones era at Iowa got off to a slow start, in large part due to America's impending involvement in World War I. Athletic Director Nelson A. Kellogg left Iowa to join the service, so Howard Jones was appointed athletic director. Iowa nearly won the Big Ten Conference, in 1918 and 1919. Losses to league champ Illinois cost the Hawkeyes the title both seasons. The 1921 Hawkeye team was one of the nation's best that year and one of the greatest in school history. The team, whose 11 starters were all native Iowans, finished with a perfect 7–0 record. Iowa defeated Notre Dame, 10–7, in their first meeting with the Irish; Notre Dame and Coach Knute Rockne had won 20 consecutive games. Iowa had a 5–0 record in Big Ten play and won its second Big Ten title. Despite the graduations of many key players, Iowa again posted a perfect 7–0 final record in the 1922 season. Iowa again went 5–0 in the Big Ten, capturing its second straight Big Ten crown. Iowa's winning streak from 1920 to 1923 lasted 20 games and almost three full years. Howard Jones' wife was not fond of Iowa City, and Jones demanded a new contract, which would allow him to coach and live in Iowa City only during football season. A conflict between Coach Jones and the chairman of the Athletics Board at Iowa contributed to the tension, and Jones eventually resigned as head coach and athletic director at Iowa. Jones went on to have a legendary career at Southern California, leading the Trojans to 7 conference titles, 5 Rose Bowls (all victories), and 3 mythical national titles. Newly hired athletic director Paul Belting needed to replace a legend, and after an attempt to lure Knute Rockne from Notre Dame failed, Belting quickly hired Burt Ingwersen, an assistant coach at Illinois. Many Iowa fans disliked Ingwersen, both because he was an Illini, and because he wasn't a famous coach like Rockne. Iowa performed very well in 1924, falling just one game short of another Big Ten title. But the detractors noted that the one league loss was to conference champion Illinois, Ingwersen's former school. Iowa soon struggled, and fan discontent with Ingwersen grew. Paul Belting shocked Hawkeye fans during the 1928 season when he announced that within the year, Iowa would be playing in a new football stadium designed to seat sixty to eighty thousand fans. Belting's promise was indeed fulfilled; the Hawkeyes left Iowa Field behind in 1929 and played most of their games that year in a new facility named Iowa Stadium.

Two incidents rocked Iowa's athletic program in 1929, the repercussions of which were felt throughout the 1930s. First, Iowa was suspended from athletic participation in the Big Ten Conference for the month of January 1930. In 1929, athletic director Paul Belting abruptly resigned and was succeeded by Edward Lauer. The Big Ten Commissioner, John L. Griffith, was concerned about widespread illegal recruiting by alumni at Big Ten schools. Belting's sudden resignation caused Griffith to call for a university investigation of the athletic department, which uncovered a slush fund totaling $4,000 existed through which athletes were given scholarships and illegal bank loans. Iowa was suspended from the Big Ten for lack of faculty control of the athletic department. Griffith also accused Iowa officials of illegal recruiting practices. The Big Ten Conference demanded that Iowa declare 14 athletes ineligible due to illegal recruiting. Iowa initially refused, claiming that the athletes accused had done nothing wrong, and stating that the blame for the situation lay with Belting and that the 14 athletes accused did not know their loans and scholarships were illegal. School officials eventually relented, suspended the players, and Iowa was reinstated. The scandal and suspension made Iowa the conference pariah for years. Iowa played just one Big Ten team, Purdue, in 1930 due to the suspension. The second incident in 1929, which had perhaps a more profound effect on Hawkeye football and certainly on the nation, was the onset of the Great Depression. Iowa, a predominantly agricultural state, was hit particularly hard by the Depression, and it hurt Iowa's athletic revenues badly. Iowa Stadium, which cost tens of thousands of dollars to build, appeared to be a monument to bad timing. With so many players gone, Iowa fell so fast and so hard that in 1931 the team scored just seven points all season long, and Coach Burt Ingwersen soon resigned, his overall record at Iowa standing at 33–27–4 (.547) despite all the difficulties caused by the athletic scandals. Lauer hired Ossie Solem of Drake University to replace Ingwersen. Iowa finished with one win overall and none in the Big Ten in both 1931 and 1932. After a fine year in 1933, Solem took over for Lauer as athletic director. The next five years were miserable for Iowa fans, as Iowa compiled a record of 11–24–5 from 1934 to 1938 under Solem and Irl Tubbs.

Iowa football was clearly struggling as 1939 began, and the entire athletic department was in poor financial shape. The debt on Iowa Stadium grew by the year, and Iowa had finished among the worst three teams in the league standings every year in the 1930s, except 1933. Iowa's new coach, Dr. Eddie Anderson, felt the Hawks, lacking depth, could still be a good team in 1939, but only if the starters played all sixty minutes. Thus, the 1939 Hawkeye football team, nicknamed the Ironmen, became one of the greatest teams in school history and certainly the most romanticized. Much of the sentimentality surrounding that team is due to Nile Kinnick. Kinnick was an all-Big Ten selection as a sophomore, when he led the nation in punting average, but he struggled through an injury-riddled junior season. Kinnick personified Anderson's Ironman mentality for the team. Kinnick played halfback (though he did most of the passing for the team), defensive back, kicker, punter, kick returner, and punt returner. Iowa finished the year with a 6–1–1 record and was ranked ninth in the final Associated Press (AP) poll. Postseason honors rolled in for the Ironmen, most of them going to Kinnick. The climax of the season occurred when Nile Kinnick won the 1939 Heisman Trophy, becoming the only Iowa Hawkeye to receive college football's most prestigious honor. Nile Kinnick was an intelligent, well-spoken, and likeable young man. Kinnick graduated as a Phi Beta Kappa scholar and was elected president of the senior class. When world war seemed inevitable, he signed up for the Navy, wanting to become a fighter pilot. On June 2, 1943, on a routine training flight in the Caribbean, Kinnick was forced to make an emergency landing in the water. His body was never found. Nile Kinnick was 24. The Ironmen revived the spirits of a depressed fan base and turned Iowa's financial fortunes around. A few years later, the athletic department would be out of financial danger, and the debt on Iowa Stadium would finally be paid off. The positive momentum that was generated for the program by the Ironmen of 1939 did not last long, as the nation geared up for World War II. Two factors hurt the Hawkeye football program in the 1940s. The first was the three-year absence of Coach Anderson. Anderson, a urologist, left the Iowa team to serve in a military hospital for the duration of the war. His departure left the Iowa team in the hands of two interim coaches: Slip Madigan in 1943 and 1944 and Clem Crowe in 1945. The second factor that hurt the Iowa program was the emergence of the Seahawks. As the war approached, Iowa City was selected as one of five campuses across the country to host a Naval Pre-Flight school for soldiers in training. This Pre-Flight school formed its own football team, called the Iowa Pre-Flight Seahawks. The Hawkeyes and the Seahawks shared the university's athletic facilities for the duration of the war. Naturally, the Pre-Flight school was seen as the more important concern, and the Hawkeyes were often second in line to use their own facilities. Nearly all the able-bodied men in Iowa City found their way into the Naval Pre-Flight school, while Iowa's roster was mostly filled with players with conditions that exempted them from military service. The results were predictable. The Hawkeyes compiled a record of 4–20–1 from 1943 to 1945. The Seahawks, conversely, had a record of 26–5 over three years, twice finishing in the AP top ten. The Seahawks had a 9–1 record in 1943 and finished the year ranked second in the nation. In 1944, the Seahawks had a record of 10–1 and finished sixth in the nation. By the time Eddie Anderson returned from the war in 1946, the Hawkeyes were devoid of talent and once again had a losing mentality. Anderson coached Iowa for four more unspectacular years from 1946 to 1949 before returning to Holy Cross. Leonard Raffensperger, who had played for Iowa in the 1920s, coached Iowa in 1950 and 1951.

In 1952, Paul Brechler, who replaced Schroeder as Iowa's athletic director in 1947, searched for a new football coach. Fritz Crisler, the athletic director and former coach at Michigan, suggested that Brechler consider Forest Evashevski. Evy, as he was called, had played quarterback for both Michigan and the Iowa Navy Pre-Flight Seahawks. Evy was coaching at Washington State, but he wanted a head job in the Big Ten. Crisler did note, however, that Evy was tough and stubborn, which could eventually cause a problem. Since Iowa hadn't won a Big Ten title in almost thirty years, Brechler took that chance and hired Evy. Evy was a charismatic and ambitious man, a brilliant coach with a combative personality. Iowa struggled in 1952, though a shocking upset of Ohio State foreshadowed the success to come. Iowa ended the 1953 season with the most controversial game in school history. The Hawkeyes had a 5–3 record as they played their final game of the season against #1 Notre Dame in South Bend. The game ended in a controversial 14–14 draw, as Notre Dame scored both of their touchdowns at the end of each half by having players fake injuries and exploiting a rule which stopped the clock for an injury. The tie cost the Irish the #1 spot in the final AP poll, dropping Notre Dame to #2. Iowa rocketed into the AP rankings, finishing the year #9 in the nation and garnering six first place votes. It was Iowa's highest ranking since 1939, and the tie gave the Iowa program national attention. After two more decent years, Evy would put together the finest five-year run in school history. From 1956 to 1960, Iowa would have a record of 37–8–2 and garner four top ten finishes, three Big Ten titles, and two Rose Bowl victories. In 1956, Iowa was 6–1 when they faced Ohio State in Iowa's last Big Ten game of the year. In one of the most hard-hitting and memorable games in Iowa history, Iowa defeated the Woody Hayes-led Buckeyes, 6–0, to clinch Iowa's fourth Big Ten title and the first in 34 years. It also secured Iowa's first Rose Bowl berth. Such a happy occasion was marred, however, by the tragic news that former Hawkeye Cal Jones had just died in a plane crash in Canada. The Hawks quietly dedicated their first bowl trip to Pasadena to Jones' memory and defeated Oregon State, 35–19. Ohio State got their revenge in 1957, defeating Iowa for the Big Ten title and handing the Hawkeyes their only defeat of the year. Iowa came back in 1958 and stormed through the Big Ten season, clinching the Big Ten title earlier than any team in conference history. Iowa went back to Pasadena and clobbered California, 38–12, setting or tying six Rose Bowl records in the process. Iowa finished the year ranked #2 in the AP poll, although the vote was taken before the bowl games. The Football Writers Association of America gave their national championship trophy, the Grantland Rice Trophy, to Iowa. (LSU was awarded the national championship by the AP and UPI, whose final polls were released before the bowl games.) Iowa went 5–4 in 1959, a season marred by a very public feud between Evy and Brechler. At the end of the 1959 season, Brechler left Iowa to become the commissioner of the Mountain States Conference. Evy, who had frequently mentioned that he never intended to grow old in coaching, clearly wanted the athletic director job. Members on the Board of Athletics, however, were concerned about the prospect of the ambitious Evashevski holding both positions. The Board told Evy that he could take either job: head football coach or athletic director. Evy chose to become Iowa's athletic director and promised to appoint a new football coach after the 1960 season. Evy's final season as football coach at Iowa was another memorable one. In 1960, Iowa overcame a fierce schedule and finished the year 8–1 and ranked #2 in the AP poll. Iowa's only loss came to Minnesota, which finished #1 in the AP poll before losing the Rose Bowl. However, Iowa defeated Ohio State in the last game of the conference season to clinch a share of the league crown with Minnesota. It was Evy's third Big Ten title at Iowa. Evy's nine years as a head coach at Iowa were wildly successful, and Forest Evashevski was eventually inducted into the College Football Hall of Fame.

Evashevski selected his assistant, Jerry Burns, to succeed him as coach of the Hawkeyes. Iowa began the 1961 season ranked #1 in the AP poll but staggered to a disappointing 5–4 record. A defeat of Notre Dame on the final game of the season gave Iowa a winning record for the year; it would be Iowa's last winning season for the next 20 years. Iowa stumbled to a 4–5 record in 1962, though for the only time in school history, Iowa defeated both Michigan and Ohio State in the same season. Two more subpar seasons put Burns on the hot seat entering 1965, but the 1965 team was predicted to do well. Instead, Iowa finished the year 1–9, and Burns was fired by his former mentor Evashevski. Evy now had to find a new head coach, and he resisted cries to fill the post himself. Instead, he tabbed Ray Nagel of Utah for the spot. Nagel seemed like an odd choice, since his record at Utah was unspectacular. His hiring was questioned even more after he had a 3–16–1 record in 1966 and 1967 at Iowa. However, the Hawkeyes set several school and conference offensive records in 1968 and finished with a 5–5 record. Many Iowa fans felt that the program had turned a corner and that 1969 would be the year that the Hawks broke through with a winning record and possibly a Rose Bowl bid. 1969 was a volatile year, with Vietnam War protests and the civil rights movement gaining full steam. In the spring of 1969, Nagel dismissed two black players from the team for disciplinary reasons. This played a role in motivating 16 black players to ignore Nagel's repeated warnings and boycott spring practice. Nagel immediately dismissed the 16 players from the team. That summer, Nagel allowed the dismissed athletes to appeal to the team for reinstatement. The team allowed seven of the twelve athletes who appealed for reinstatement to rejoin the squad. But the damage was done. The Black Boycott, as it was called, doomed Iowa to another 5–5 record. Further, the team was distracted by a growing and very public feud between Nagel and athletic director Evashevski. The Board of Athletics completed a long investigation of the Iowa football program and decided to fire both Evy and Nagel. Bump Elliott, former head football coach at Michigan, was hired to replace Evy as athletic director. Then the Board reversed itself and allowed Elliott to rehire Nagel before the 1970 season. The offseason turmoil did not help the 1970 Hawkeye squad, which finished 3–6–1. At the end of that season, Nagel had had enough of the emotional roller coaster at Iowa and abruptly resigned. Elliott hired Frank Lauterbur to replace Nagel. The program hit rock bottom, as Iowa went 4–28–1 from 1971 to 1973 under Lauterbur. That included an embarrassing 0–11 record in 1973, the only winless season for the Hawks since Iowa's first season in 1889. The highlight of Lauterbur's tenure at Iowa came in 1972, when Iowa Stadium was officially renamed Kinnick Stadium, in honor of the 1939 Heisman Trophy winner. In 1974, Bob Commings became the third Iowa graduate to lead the Hawkeye football team, joining John G. Griffith in 1909 and Leonard Raffensperger in 1950–1951. Occasional upset victories kept Commings in Iowa City for five years. Iowa had 3–8 records in 1974 and 1975, and then the Hawks went to the brink of a winning record with 5–6 records in 1976 and 1977. But Commings' Hawkeyes slumped to a 2–9 record in 1978, and Commings was fired after five seasons.

=== Hayden Fry era (1979–1998) ===
It had been 17 years since Iowa had posted a winning record, the longest such drought in the nation. Bump Elliott sought to end it with the hiring of John Hayden Fry from North Texas. Elliott publicly stated that Fry would be the last football coach he would ever hire. Elliott believed that after the failures of Lauterbur and Commings, a failure by Fry to turn Iowa's program around would cause the fans to ask for more than just the job of the head coach this time around. Fry, a lifelong Texan, was full of Southern charm and interesting anecdotes. Fry turned his attention to changing a losing attitude and starting new traditions at Iowa. Hayden would not celebrate close losses or moral victories. Fry assembled a terrific coaching staff, bringing many of his assistant coaches with him from North Texas. He emphasized defense and brought a wide-open passing game to the Big Ten for the first time. All this did not immediately translate into wins. Iowa had losing seasons in 1979 and 1980, and some began to wonder if Fry would suffer the same fate as the four coaches before him. But that all changed in 1981, a magical season for Hawkeye fans. Iowa began the season by upsetting Nebraska, a team that had defeated Iowa 57–0 the previous season. Iowa had a record of 8–3 in the regular season in 1981, their first winning record in 21 years. The Hawks also garnered a share of the Big Ten title and a Rose Bowl berth. Iowa went 25–11–1 from 1982 to 1984 and qualified for three more bowl games. 1985 was arguably Fry's best season at Iowa. Iowa was ranked #1 in the AP poll for five weeks in October and used thrilling, last-minute victories over Michigan State and Michigan to win their first outright Big Ten title since 1958 and a 10–1 regular season record. Iowa played in the Rose Bowl. The Hawkeyes had a 25–10–3 record from 1986 to 1988 and qualified for three more bowl games. Fry had taken Iowa to eight straight winning seasons and eight bowl games before going 5–6 in 1989. The Hawkeyes bounced right back in 1990, winning Iowa's ninth Big Ten title and qualifying for Iowa's fifth Rose Bowl, though Iowa lost in Pasadena for the third time under Fry. Iowa went 10–1 in 1991, but Iowa's lone loss cost the Hawks another Big Ten title and a Rose Bowl trip.

As Fry got older and several assistant coaches departed for other coaching jobs, Iowa had a down period from 1992 to 1994, posting a 16–18–1 record and qualifying for just one bowl game, a 37–3 Alamo Bowl loss. But Fry had one last strong run in him. Iowa went 7–4 and won the Sun Bowl in 1995, and the Hawks went 8–3 and won the Alamo Bowl in 1996, a game in which the Hawkeyes wore blank black helmets in honor of linebacker Mark Mitchell's mother, Diane Mitchell, who had died in a car accident on the way to the game. In 1997, the Hawkeyes were expected to again challenge for the Big Ten title. Instead, Iowa settled for a 7–4 record and a loss in the Sun Bowl. Iowa went just 3–8 in 1998, Fry's worst season at Iowa. It would also be his last, as Hayden Fry would retire from coaching at the end of the year. It is difficult to overstate Hayden Fry's positive impact on Iowa football. Fry coached twenty years at Iowa, more than twice as long as any coach before him. Hayden had a 143–89–6 record at Iowa and led the Hawkeyes to three Big Ten titles, three Rose Bowl appearances, and 14 bowl games. But more than that, Coach Hayden Fry established a winning tradition at Iowa, on and off the field. Iowa was no longer considered a coaching graveyard but rather, a place where a great coach could excel. Several of Fry's former assistants followed Fry's example in resurrecting other struggling football programs. Fry retired after the 1998 season.

=== Kirk Ferentz era (1999–present) ===
Those former Fry assistants were courted heavily after Hayden Fry announced his retirement in 1998. Bob Bowlsby, who had succeeded Bump Elliott as athletic director in 1990, entertained several candidates for the position, but one candidate was clearly the fan favorite. Bob Stoops, who had played defensive back on the 1982 Rose Bowl team and later coached under Fry, was the defensive coordinator under Steve Spurrier at Florida. Most Hawkeye fans saw him as a natural successor to Fry. Shortly after an interview with Iowa, Stoops decided to take the coaching job at Oklahoma. Most Iowa fans were furious at Bowlsby for not doing enough, in their minds, to convince Stoops to take the Iowa job. Many fans were not appeased when Bowlsby announced that Kirk Ferentz would be the next Iowa coach. Some fans were consoled by the fact that the new coach had Iowa ties. Ferentz was Fry's offensive line coach from 1981 to 1989, the best years of Hayden's tenure at Iowa. Ferentz left Iowa to become the head coach at Maine and was later hired to work as an assistant for the Cleveland Browns and head coach Bill Belichick. Ferentz made the move with the Browns to Baltimore and was an assistant coach for the Baltimore Ravens when Bowlsby called him to Iowa City. The fact that Ferentz had Coach Fry's seal of approval quieted many Hawk fans, though several still loudly bemoaned not hiring Stoops. Since Fry was not able to leave Ferentz with much talent on the field, Iowa's 1–10 overall record and 0–8 record in the Big Ten in 1999 was not entirely unexpected. Iowa appeared to hit rock bottom in 2000 when Iowa entered the Big Ten 0–4, and given Iowa's conference record in 1999, a 0–12 season was not an impossibility. Instead, Iowa charted a 3–5 record in the Big Ten, narrowly missing a chance at a .500 league record. The Hawkeyes went 6–5 in 2001, defeating Minnesota 42–24 to clinch a bowl bid and take back Floyd of Rosedale. Iowa capped the year by upsetting Texas Tech in the Alamo Bowl.

Nothing could have prepared Iowa fans for the 2002 season. Following a non-conference loss to Iowa State, Iowa won nine consecutive games. Iowa finished the regular season 11–1 and clinched a berth in the Orange Bowl, where the #5 USC Trojans defeated the #3 Hawkeyes, 38–17. The Hawkeyes had an 8–0 record in the Big Ten and won a share of the league title for the first time since 1990. The 2002 team set the school record for overall wins and Big Ten wins in a season, and numerous Hawkeye players won major national awards. In 2003, the Hawkeyes went 9–3, earning a trip to the Outback Bowl. The Hawks defeated Florida, 37–17, to give Iowa back-to-back ten win seasons for the first time in school history. In 2004, a slew of injuries to Iowa tailbacks left the Hawks with virtually no running game all year. Iowa lost six tailbacks to injury, and many of their injuries were season-ending. Still, following a 2–2 start, Iowa used a powerful defense and an opportunistic offense to win seven straight Big Ten games. On the final day of the season, Iowa defeated the Wisconsin Badgers, 30–7, to clinch the eleventh Big Ten title in school history. Iowa, with a record of 9–2, was awarded a berth in the Capital One Bowl to face defending national champion LSU. Iowa defeated the Tigers, 30–25, in one of the most spectacular finishes in the history of college football. After trailing the entire game, LSU took their first lead with 47 seconds remaining. On the game's final play, Iowa's Drew Tate fired a 56-yard, game-winning touchdown pass to Warren Holloway as time expired. The win gave Iowa its third straight ten win season. In 2005, Iowa went 7–4 with a 5–3 record in the Big Ten. Just like in 2003, the Hawkeyes accepted an invitation to play Florida in the Outback Bowl. But this time, the Gators got a measure of revenge for their loss two years earlier by defeating the Hawkeyes, 31–24. In 2006, Iowa started the season strong with a 5–1 record, losing only to top-ranked Ohio State. However, the Hawkeyes collapsed down the stretch, losing five of their last six games, including shocking losses to Northwestern and Indiana. Iowa finished the season with a 6–7 record, after losing to a heavily favored Texas team, 26–24, in the Alamo Bowl. In 2007, Ferentz' Hawkeyes started 2–4 and lost their first three conference games. An upset victory over Illinois ended a nine-game conference losing streak for Iowa, and the Hawkeyes closed out the Big Ten season by winning their last three conference games. However, a disappointing loss in the season finale to Western Michigan dropped the Hawkeyes' season record to 6–6. Though Iowa was bowl eligible, the Hawkeyes did not receive a bowl bid, snapping Iowa's streak of six consecutive bowl appearances.

2008 marked Ferentz' tenth season as the head coach at Iowa. The 2008 Hawkeyes started the season 3–3, with the three losses coming by a combined nine points. But Iowa ended the season very strong, defeating third-ranked Penn State, 24–23, on a last second field goal, and handing Minnesota a 55–0 defeat, their worst conference loss in over a century of Big Ten play. In all, the Hawks won five of their last six conference games to finish the regular season with an 8–4 record and earn a trip to the Outback Bowl, where Iowa defeated South Carolina, 31–10. The 2009 season proved to be one of the greatest in Iowa football history. The opener pitted the Hawkeyes against in-state FCS foe Northern Iowa. Trailing by one point in the final seconds of the game, UNI opted for a field goal but the attempt was blocked, seemingly clinching the game for Iowa. However, officials ruled that since the attempt occurred on third down and was recovered by Northern Iowa behind the line of scrimmage, the Panthers retained possession with one more down to play. Amazingly, a second field goal attempt was also blocked by the Hawkeyes, giving them the 17–16 win. Iowa would go on to a school record 9–0 start to the season but fell to Northwestern after quarterback Ricky Stanzi left the game with a leg injury. The Hawkeyes lost the next week to Ohio State University in overtime but finished the season with the second straight shutout of Minnesota. Receiving their second invitation to play in the Orange Bowl, Iowa's stout defense led the Hawkeyes to a 24–14 victory over the ACC Champion Georgia Tech Yellow Jackets, giving Iowa its first BCS-level bowl victory since the 1950s. 2010 came with high expectations after the Orange bowl season. The 2010 season didn't live up to the hype as the team failed to close out games. They lost four games by a total of four points or less. Iowa accepted an invitation to play Missouri in the Insight Bowl. Winning a thrilling game 27–24 on late game interception for a touchdown, finishing the season 8–5. 2011 was another season marked with high hopes, but with the injury to Mik'ail McCall in the first game and a devastating 3OT loss to Iowa State, 44–41, the season became a disappointment, culminating with a loss in the Insight Bowl to Oklahoma and a 7–6 record. In 2012 the Hawkeyes saw their worst season under Ferentz. With offensive coordinator Ken O'Keefe leaving for an assistant position with the Miami Dolphins and defensive coordinator Norm Parker retiring, the Hawks looked to new coordinators. Greg Davis came to Iowa from Texas, and Phil Parker was promoted to defensive coordinator. The Hawkeyes began the season 4–2, but went on a 6-game losing streak to finish the season 4–8. 2013 saw the Hawkeyes improve, coming off a 4–8 record, to go 8–5 overall, and 5–3 in the Big Ten, giving them a 2nd-place finish in the Big Ten Legends Division. Iowa lost to LSU in the Outback Bowl, 14–21. The 2014 Hawkeyes football team ended up 7–6, 4–4 in the first year of the West Division of the Big Ten. Iowa was invited to play Tennessee in the TaxSlayer Bowl, where they went into halftime down 7–35 and eventually lost 28–45.

With rumors mounting and talks of Ferentz being on the hot seat, the Hawkeyes did not have high expectations leading into the 2015 season. The Hawkeyes started out strong and beat a Pittsburgh team with a last second 57-yard field goal by Marshall Koehn. Iowa went on to beat #19 Wisconsin to break into the Top 25. Iowa finished the regular season 12–0, 8–0 in the Big Ten, with speculations that Iowa might appear in the College Football Playoff (CFP) after finishing the regular season ranked #4 in the nation. However, in a de facto CFP play-in game, Iowa lost to #5 Michigan State in the Big Ten Championship, 13–16. As a result, Iowa was left out of the CFP but was selected to represent the Big Ten in the Rose Bowl. In Pasadena, the Hawks were tasked with containing Heisman runner-up Christian McCaffery and his #5 Stanford Cardinal. McCaffery took the opening play of scrimmage for a 75-yard touchdown and the Cardinal never looked back, defeating Iowa 45–16. Iowa finished the 2015 season 12–2, 8–1 in the Big Ten, and #9 in the AP. Ferentz is ranked as one of the finest coaches in college football by several publications. Because of both his record at Iowa and his NFL ties, Ferentz is often named as a potential candidate for NFL head coaching vacancies. However, Ferentz has stated that he is happy at Iowa, and his current contract, which runs through 2022, pays him $4.075 million annually.
