= 1911 Iowa Hawkeyes football team =

American college football season

1911 Iowa Hawkeyes football
- Conference: Western Conference
- Record: 3–4 (2–2 Western)
- Head coach: Jesse Hawley (2nd season)
- Captain: James Murphy Sr.
- Home stadium: Iowa Field

1911 Western Conference football standings
	Conf.					Overall
Team	W		L		T	W		L		T
Minnesota $	3	–	0	–	1	6	–	0	–	1
Chicago	5	–	1	–	0	6	–	1	–	0
Wisconsin	2	–	1	–	1	5	–	1	–	1
Illinois	2	–	2	–	1	4	–	2	–	1
Iowa	2	–	2	–	0	3	–	4	–	0
Purdue	1	–	3	–	0	3	–	4	–	0
Northwestern	1	–	4	–	0	3	–	4	–	0
Indiana	0	–	3	–	1	3	–	3	–	1
$ – Conference champion

The 1911 Iowa Hawkeyes football team was an American football team that represented the State University of Iowa ("S.U.I."), now commonly known as the University of Iowa, as a member of the Western Conference during the 1911 college football season. In their second year under head coach Jesse Hawley, the Hawkeyes compiled a 3–4 record (2–2 in conference games), finished in fifth place in the Western Conference, and were outscored by a total of 53 to 34.

James Murphy Sr. was the team captain. Center Willis O'Brien was named to the 1911 All-Western college football team. Playing at the tackle position from 1909 to 1911, Archie Alexander was the second African-American to play football at Iowa. (Frank Kinney Holbrook was the first.)

The team played its home games at Iowa Field in Iowa City, Iowa.

== Schedule ==
Date	Opponent	Site	Result	Attendance	Source
October 14	Morningside*	Iowa Field; Iowa City, IA	W 11–5		
October 21	Cornell (IA)*	Iowa Field; Iowa City, IA	L 0–3		
October 28	at Minnesota	Northrop Field; Minneapolis, MN (rivalry)	L 6–24	5,000	
November 4	at Wisconsin	Randall Field; Madison, WI (rivalry)	L 0–12		
November 11	at Purdue	Stuart Field; West Lafayette, IN	W 11–0		
November 18	Iowa State*	Iowa Field; Iowa City, IA (rivalry)	L 0–9		
November 25	Northwestern	Iowa Field; Iowa City, IA	W 6–0		
*Non-conference game

== Players ==
The following 13 players received major varsity letters for their participation on the 1911 football team:

- Archie Alexander, tackle
- Burton Baird, halfback
- George Buckley, end
- Paul Curry, quarterback
- Henry Hanson, guard
- Ralph McGinnis, halfback
- Charles Meloy, quarterback
- Jame Murphy Sr., fullback and captain
- John Ney, tackle
- Willis O'Brien, center
- Walter Penningroth, end/halfback
- Jim Trickey, guard
- Herman Von Lackum, end
