= 1910 Chicago Maroons football team =

American college football season

1910 Chicago Maroons football
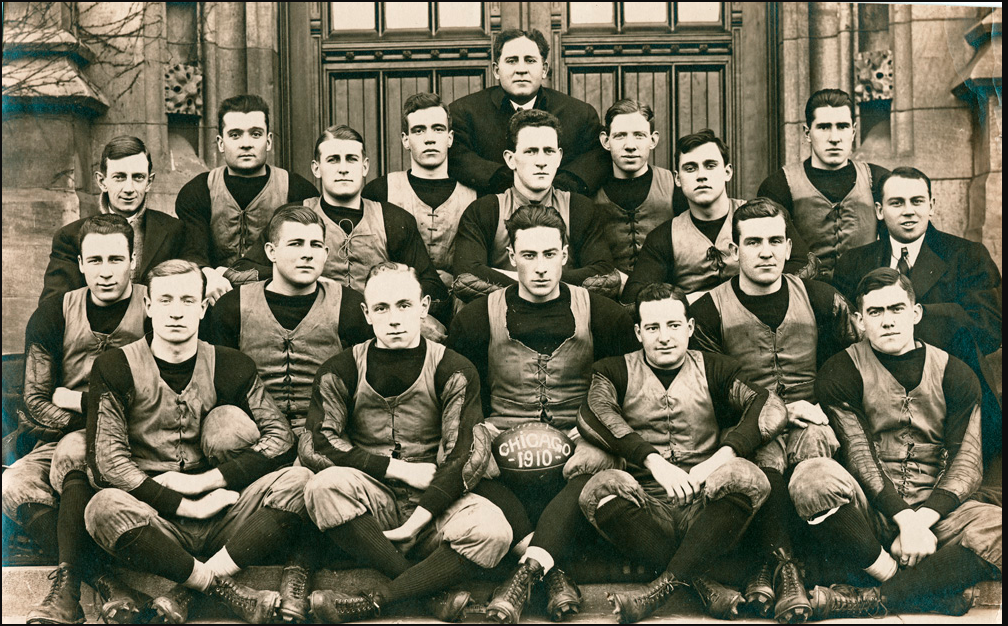
- Conference: Western Conference
- Record: 2–5 (2–4 Western)
- Head coach: Amos Alonzo Stagg (19th season)
- Captain: William Lucas Crawley
- Home stadium: Marshall Field

1910 Western Conference football standings
	Conf.					Overall
Team	W		L		T	W		L		T
Illinois +	4	–	0	–	0	7	–	0	–	0
Minnesota +	2	–	0	–	0	6	–	1	–	0
Indiana	3	–	1	–	0	5	–	1	–	0
Iowa	1	–	1	–	0	5	–	2	–	0
Wisconsin	1	–	2	–	1	1	–	2	–	2
Northwestern	1	–	2	–	1	1	–	3	–	1
Chicago	2	–	4	–	0	2	–	5	–	0
Purdue	0	–	4	–	0	1	–	5	–	0
+ – Conference co-champions

The 1910 Chicago Maroons football team was an American football team that represented the University of Chicago during the 1910 college football season. In their 19th season under head coach Amos Alonzo Stagg, the Maroons compiled a 2–5 record, finished in fifth place in the Western Conference with a 2–4 record against conference opponents, and were outscored by their opponents by a combined total of 66 to 24.

== Schedule ==
Date	Opponent	Site	Result	Source
October 8	Indiana	Marshall Field; Chicago, IL	L 0–6	
October 15	at Illinois	Illinois Field; Champaign, IL	L 0–3	
October 22	Northwestern	Marshall Field; Chicago, IL	W 10–0	
October 29	Minnesota	Marshall Field; Chicago, IL	L 0–24	
November 5	Purdue	Marshall Field; Chicago, IL (rivalry)	W 14–5	
November 12	at Cornell*	Percy Field; Ithaca, NY	L 0–18	
November 19	at Wisconsin	Randall Field; Madison, WI	L 0–10	
*Non-conference game

== Roster ==
Player	Position	Weight
William Lucas Crawley (captain)	right halfback	176
Halstead Carpenter	right tackle	183
Ira Nelson Davenport	left halfback	160
Walter Scott Kassulker	left end	163
James Menaul	right end	157
Norman C. Paine	left end	155
Charles M. Rademacher	left tackle	194
Rufus Boynton Rogers	left halfback	154
Clark G. Sauer	right end	167
Charles Pierre Sawyer	left guard	190
Horace Whiteside	right guard	192
Lawrence Harley Whiting	center	174
Eberle Irving Wilson	quarterback	160
Hume Cliffton Young	quarterback	138
Ralph Hayward Young	fullback	183
Nicolai B. Johnson	trainer

- Head coach: Amos Alonzo Stagg (19th year at Chicago)
