= 1911 Chicago Maroons football team =

American college football season

1911 Chicago Maroons football
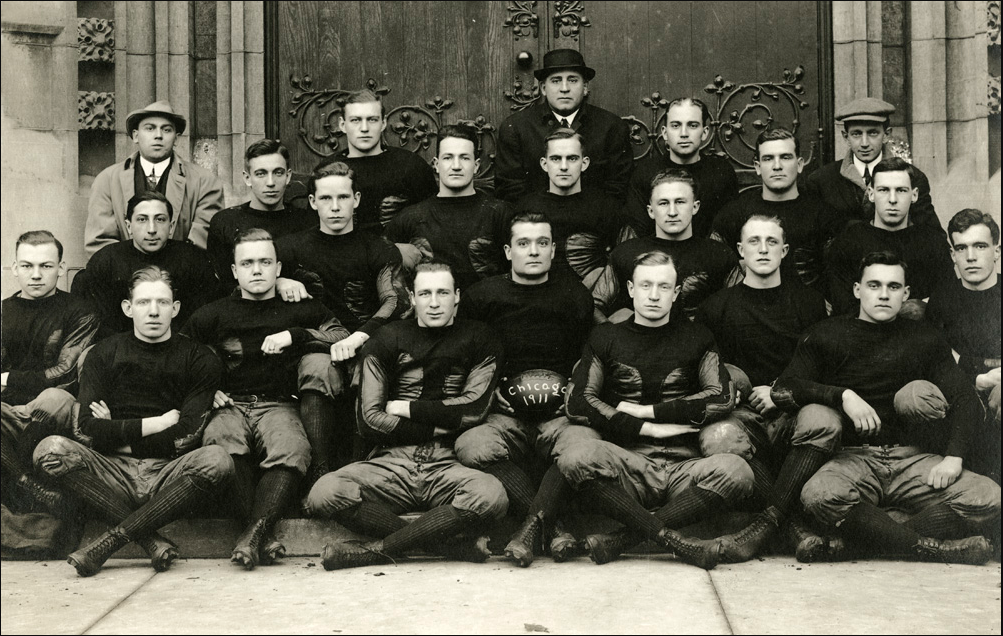
- Conference: Western Conference
- Record: 6–1 (6–1 Western)
- Head coach: Amos Alonzo Stagg (20th season)
- Captain: Charles M. Rademacher
- Home stadium: Marshall Field

1911 Western Conference football standings
	Conf.					Overall
Team	W		L		T	W		L		T
Minnesota $	3	–	0	–	1	6	–	0	–	1
Chicago	5	–	1	–	0	6	–	1	–	0
Wisconsin	2	–	1	–	1	5	–	1	–	1
Illinois	2	–	2	–	1	4	–	2	–	1
Iowa	2	–	2	–	0	3	–	4	–	0
Purdue	1	–	3	–	0	3	–	4	–	0
Northwestern	1	–	4	–	0	3	–	4	–	0
Indiana	0	–	3	–	1	3	–	3	–	1
$ – Conference champion

The 1911 Chicago Maroons football team was an American football team that represented the University of Chicago during the 1911 college football season. In their 20th season under head coach Amos Alonzo Stagg, the Maroons compiled a 6–1 record, finished in second place in the Western Conference with a 5–1 record against conference opponents, and outscored all opponents by a combined total of 78 to 42.

The team included the future University of Chicago head basketball coach Nelson Norgren as well as Clark G. Sauer and Horace Frank Scruby, consensus all-conference players.

== Schedule ==
Date	Opponent	Site	Result	Attendance	Source
October 7	Indiana	Marshall Field; Chicago, IL	W 23–6		
October 14	Purdue	Marshall Field; Chicago, IL (rivalry)	W 11–3		
October 21	Illinois	Marshall Field; Chicago, IL	W 24–0		
November 4	at Minnesota	Northrop Field; Minneapolis, MN	L 0–30	20,000	
November 11	at Northwestern	Northwestern Field; Evanston, IL	W 9–3		
November 18	Cornell*	Marshall Field; Chicago, IL	W 6–0		
November 25	Wisconsin	Marshall Field; Chicago, IL	W 5–0		
*Non-conference game

== Roster ==
Player	Position	Weight
Charles M. Rademacher (captain)	right halfback	176
John Bennett Canning	right guard	160
Halstead Marvin Carpenter	right tackle	187
Ira Nelson Davenport	left halfback	165
Clarence Preston Freeman	center	186
Walter Wood Goddard	left guard	177
Harold Ernest Goettler	right end	183
Harvey Louis Harris	left guard	171
Walter Scott Kassulker	left end	178
Walter Lee Kennedy	right halfback	175
Joseph Brown Lawler	quarterback	143
Nelson Norgren	right halfback	169
Norman C. Paine	quarterback	158
Stanley Robert Pierce	Fullback	171
Clark G. Sauer	left halfback	165
Horace Frank Scruby	right guard	187
Sanford Sellers, Jr.	right tackle	167
Robert Vier Fonger	fullback	151
Lawrence Harley Whiting	center	175
Leon Burdette Walker	reserve right end	155
Horace Charles Fitzpatrick	reserve fullback	156
Nicolai B. Johnson	trainer

- Head coach: Amos Alonzo Stagg (20th year at Chicago)
