= 1910 Illinois Fighting Illini football team =

American college football season

1910 Illinois Fighting Illini football
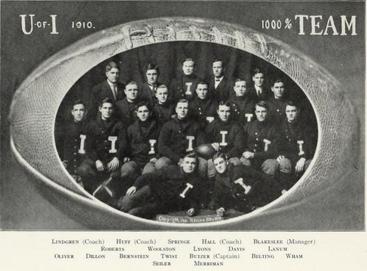

Western Conference co-champion
- Conference: Western Conference
- Record: 7–0 (4–0 Western)
- Head coach: Arthur R. Hall (5th season)
- Captain: G. D. Butzer
- Home stadium: Illinois Field

1910 Western Conference football standings
	Conf.					Overall
Team	W		L		T	W		L		T
Illinois +	4	–	0	–	0	7	–	0	–	0
Minnesota +	2	–	0	–	0	6	–	1	–	0
Indiana	3	–	1	–	0	5	–	1	–	0
Iowa	1	–	1	–	0	5	–	2	–	0
Wisconsin	1	–	2	–	1	1	–	2	–	2
Northwestern	1	–	2	–	1	1	–	3	–	1
Chicago	2	–	4	–	0	2	–	5	–	0
Purdue	0	–	4	–	0	1	–	5	–	0
+ – Conference co-champions

The 1910 Illinois Fighting Illini football team was an American football team that represented the University of Illinois as a member of the Western Conference during the 1910 college football season. In their fifth season under head coach Arthur R. Hall, the Illini compiled a perfect 7–0 record (4–0 in conference games), won the Western Conference championship, and outscored opponents by a total of 89 to 0.

Four Illinois players received honors on the 1910 All-Western college football team: halfback Otto Seiler; guards Glenn D. Butzer and Paul Belting; center John F. "Heavy" Twist.

== Schedule ==
Date	Opponent	Site	Result	Source
October 1	Millikin*	Illinois Field; Champaign, IL	W 11–0	
October 8	Drake*	Illinois Field; Champaign, IL	W 29–0	
October 15	Chicago	Illinois Field; Champaign, IL	W 3–0	
October 29	at Purdue	Stuart Field; West Lafayette, IN (rivalry)	W 11–0	
November 5	at Indiana	Jordan Field; Bloomington, IN (rivalry)	W 3–0	
November 12	at Northwestern	Northwestern Field; Evanston, IL (rivalry)	W 27–0	
November 19	Syracuse*	Illinois Field; Champaign, IL	W 3–0	
*Non-conference game

== Roster ==
Player	Position
T. Edwin Lyons	Right end
Otto Springe	Right tackle
Glenn D. Butzer	Right guard
J. Frank Twist	Center
Charles H. Belting	Left guard
Charles Wham	Left tackle
Chauncey B. Oliver	Left end
Otto E. Seiler	Quarterback
Johnny Merriman	Quarterback
Chester C. Dillon	Right halfback
Louis S. Bernstein	Left halfback
Chester C. Roberts	Fullback
William H. Woolston	Substitute end and back
Harold B. Lanum	Substitute tackle and guard
Chester W. Davis	Substitute center and guard

- Head coach: Arthur R. Hall (5th year at Illinois)

== Awards and honors ==
- Glenn D. Butzer, guard

- Third-team pick by Walter Camp for the Collier's Weekly 1910 All-America team
- Outing magazine honor roll of the game's top players "chosen on the judgement of various coaches of college football elevens"; at some positions multiple selections without designation as first or second teams

- Homer Dutter, tackle

- Outing magazine honor roll
