= Charles Hammett =

American football and basketball coach, college athletics administrator

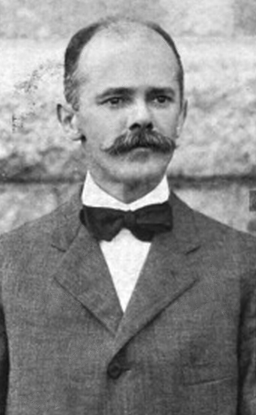
- Hammett pictured in The Syllabus 1911, Northwestern yearbook

Biographical details
- Born: January 29, 1865; Frederick County, Maryland, U.S.
- Died: October 2, 1945 (aged 80); Meadville, Pennsylvania, U.S.

Coaching career (HC unless noted)

Football
- 1910–1912: Northwestern
- 1913–1917: Allegheny
- 1919: Allegheny

Basketball
- 1911–1912: Northwestern
- 1913–1918: Allegheny
- 1919–1920: Allegheny
- 1921–1922: Allegheny

Administrative career (AD unless noted)
- 1910–1913: Northwestern

Head coaching record
- Overall: 35–19–6 (football); 60–41 (basketball)

Charles Edward Hammett Sr. (January 29, 1865 – October 2, 1945) was an American college football and college basketball coach and athletics administrator. He served as the head football coach at Northwestern University from 1910 to 1912 and at Allegheny College from 1913 to 1917 and in 1919, compiling a career college football coaching record of 35–19–6. Hammett was also the head basketball coach at Northwestern (1911–1912) and Allegheny (1913–1918, 1919–1920, 1921–1922), tallying a career college basketball coaching mark of 60–41. In addition, he served as Northwestern's athletic director from 1910 to 1913.

Hammett was born in Frederick County, Maryland in 1865 to David Calvin and Ellen (née Krieger) Hammett. He died of a stroke in 1945 at the age of 80.

== Head coaching record ==
=== Football ===
Year	Team	Overall	Conference	Standing	Bowl/playoffs
Northwestern Purple (Western Conference) (1910–1912)
1910	Northwestern	1–3–1	0–2	T–5th	
1911	Northwestern	3–4	0–2	T–6th	
1912	Northwestern	2–3–1	0–2	T–6th	
Northwestern:		6–10–2	0–2		
Allegheny Gators (Independent) (1913–1917)
1913	Allegheny	7–1			
1914	Allegheny	6–0–1			
1915	Allegheny	5–3			
1916	Allegheny	4–2–1			
1917	Allegheny	6–0–1			
Allegheny Gators (Independent) (1919)
1919	Allegheny	1–3–1			
Allegheny:		29–9–4			
Total:		35–19–6			
