= 1910 Kansas Jayhawks football team =

American college football season

1910 Kansas Jayhawks football
- Conference: Missouri Valley Conference
- Record: 6–1–1 (1–1–1 MVC)
- Head coach: A. R. Kennedy (7th season)
- Captain: Tommy Johnson
- Home stadium: McCook Field

1910 Missouri Valley Conference football standings
	Conf.					Overall
Team	W		L		T	W		L		T
Nebraska $	2	–	0	–	0	7	–	1	–	0
Iowa	3	–	1	–	0	5	–	2	–	0
Missouri	2	–	1	–	1	4	–	2	–	2
Iowa State	2	–	2	–	0	4	–	4	–	0
Kansas	1	–	1	–	1	6	–	1	–	1
Washington University	0	–	2	–	0	3	–	4	–	0
Drake	0	–	3	–	0	3	–	5	–	0
$ – Conference champion

The 1910 Kansas Jayhawks football team was an American football team that represented the University of Kansas as a member of the Missouri Valley Conference (MVC) during the 1910 college football season. In their seventh and final season under head coach A. R. Kennedy, the Jayhawks compiled a 6–1–1 record (1–1–1 against conference opponents), finished in fifth place in the conference, and outscored opponents by a total of 75 to 22. The Jayhawks played home games at McCook Field in Lawrence, Kansas. Tommy Johnson was the team captain.

== Schedule ==
Date	Time	Opponent	Site	Result	Attendance	Source
October 1		Ottawa*	McCook Field; Lawrence, KS	W 11–0		
October 8		St. Mary's (KS)*	McCook Field; Lawrence, KS	W 9–5	1,500	
October 15		Baker*	McCook Field; Lawrence, KS	W 21–0	2,000	
October 22		at Drake	Des Moines, IA	W 6–0		
October 29		Washburn*	McCook Field; Lawrence, KS	W 21–6	3,500	
November 5		Nebraska	McCook Field; Lawrence, KS (rivalry)	L 0–6	6,500	
November 12		at Oklahoma*	Boyd Field; Norman, OK	W 2–0		
November 24	2:00 p.m.	vs. Missouri	Gordon and Koppel Field; Kansas City, MO (rivalry)	T 5–5	20,000	
*Non-conference game
