= 1911 Purdue Boilermakers football team =

American college football season

1911 Purdue Boilermakers football
- Conference: Western Conference
- Record: 3–4 (1–3 Western)
- Head coach: Bill Horr (2nd season)
- Captain: R. W. Tavey
- Home stadium: Stuart Field

1911 Western Conference football standings
	Conf.					Overall
Team	W		L		T	W		L		T
Minnesota $	3	–	0	–	1	6	–	0	–	1
Chicago	5	–	1	–	0	6	–	1	–	0
Wisconsin	2	–	1	–	1	5	–	1	–	1
Illinois	2	–	2	–	1	4	–	2	–	1
Iowa	2	–	2	–	0	3	–	4	–	0
Purdue	1	–	3	–	0	3	–	4	–	0
Northwestern	1	–	4	–	0	3	–	4	–	0
Indiana	0	–	3	–	1	3	–	3	–	1
$ – Conference champion

The 1911 Purdue Boilermakers football team was an American football team which represented Purdue University during the 1911 college football season. In their second season under head coach Bill Horr, the Boilermakers compiled a 3–4 record, finished in sixth place in the Western Conference with a 1–3 record against conference opponents and outscored their opponents by a total of 58 to 48. R. W. Tavey was the team captain.

== Schedule ==
Date	Opponent	Site	Result	Source
October 8	Wabash*	Stuart Field; West Lafayette, IN	L 0–3	
October 15	at Chicago	Stagg Field; Chicago, IL (rivalry)	L 3–11	
October 28	DePauw*	Stuart Field; West Lafayette, IN	W 5–0	
November 4	at Illinois	Illinois Field; Champaign, IL (rivalry)	L 3–12	
November 11	Iowa	Stuart Field; West Lafayette, IN	L 0–11	
November 18	Rose Polytechnic*	Stuart Field; West Lafayette, IN	W 35–6	
November 25	at Indiana	Jordan Field; Bloomington, IN (Old Oaken Bucket)	W 12–5	
*Non-conference game

== Roster ==
- E. G. Ball, E
- John Berns, G
- William Bowman, G
- Marton Collen, T
- C. D. Dunwoody
- G. H. Fletcher, QB
- Al Freygang, T
- C. E. Glossop, C
- Frank Hanna, E
- Robert Hutchison, QB
- Don Miles, E
- James Miller, E
- Alan Ogan, FB
- Elmer Oliphant, HB
- Van Ruffner, G
- C. S. Winston
