= Edward Lauer =

Edward H. Lauer was an athletic director for the University of Iowa from 1929-1934. He was the fourth athletic director in school history, and he guided the athletic department through a one-month Big Ten suspension from athletic competition and the first few years of the Great Depression.

== Background ==
Edward Lauer graduated from the University of Michigan in 1916. He was named a professor at the University of Iowa in 1921. In 1927, Lauer was named director of Iowa’s Extension Division.

== Athletic director ==
Paul Belting, Iowa’s athletic director, abruptly resigned at the end of his five-year contract on April 26, 1929. University president Walter Jessup appointed Edward Lauer to become the fourth athletic director in school history on May 7, 1929, and Lauer agreed to take over the duties of athletic director on June 1, 1929. On May 25, Lauer attended his first Big Ten meeting of athletic directors in Chicago, Illinois. At that meeting, Lauer was told that Iowa would be suspended from Big Ten athletic competition on January 1, 1930, due to alleged recruiting violations.

Lauer, who had no known connection to any of the alleged violations, began a long process to get Iowa’s athletic department reinstated. He attended a Big Ten meeting in December 1929, where Iowa’s request for reinstatement was denied. Finally, on February 1, 1930, the suspension of Iowa’s athletic department was rescinded by the Big Ten.

== Departure ==
After five years as Iowa’s athletic director, Lauer resigned in June 1934. Iowa named their football coach, Ossie Solem, to succeed him. Lauer took a job with the University of Washington, where he was named dean of the College of Arts & Sciences.
