= Tommy Johnson (basketball) =

American basketball/football player (1885–1911)

- Johnson in 1908

Personal information
- Born: 1885 East Atchison, Missouri, U.S.
- Died: November 24, 1911 (aged 26) Kansas City, Missouri, U.S.
- Listed height: 5 ft 11 in (1.80 m)
- Listed weight: 160 lb (73 kg)

Career information
- High school: Lawrence (Lawrence, Kansas)
- College: Kansas (1908–1910)
- Position: Guard / forward

Career highlights
- Consensus All-American (1909)

Thomas Warwick Johnson (1885 – November 24, 1911) was an American college basketball and football player for the Kansas Jayhawks. He was chosen as an All-American as a member of the Jayhawks basketball team in 1909 which was the first nationally recognized individual athletic award in University of Kansas history. Johnson struggled with poor health throughout his life and was forced to end his athletic career prematurely in 1911. He died of tuberculosis later that year. Johnson was once considered the best athlete to ever play for the Jayhawks but had his legacy relegated during the decades after his death.

== Early life ==
Johnson was born in East Atchison, Missouri in 1885. His father died when he was aged 1. Johnson was poor in health as a child which prevented him from participating in sports. He began training in athletics when he was aged 8. Johnson's family moved to Lawrence, Kansas, in 1901. He attended Lawrence High School where he developed into a general athlete. Johnson was captain of the track team, a champion broad jumper, pole vaulter, high hurdler, and high jumper at Lawrence. He played as a quarterback on the school's football team for four years and was a captain part of the time.

== College career ==
=== Football ===
Johnson enrolled at the University of Kansas in 1905. He tried out for the Jayhawks football team as a freshman but was told that he would never develop into a football player. Johnson was injured in a scrimmage at the start of the season and did not make the team. Unable to pay his expenses, he left the university and was out of school for the next two years. Johnson was employed as an assistant secretary at the city YMCA and was active in its athletic departments.

In 1908, Johnson was induced to return to school by Jayhawks head coach A. R. Kennedy and took the position of quarterback. The 1908 team was undefeated and won the Missouri Valley Intercollegiate Athletic Association championship. Johnson played as quarterback the following season and was selected as the All-Western quarterback in 1909. He made a famed play in the final game of the season against the Nebraska Cornhuskers when he ran nearly the length of the field for the only score of the game. Johnson served as team captain during the 1910 season. In his three years playing football for the Jayhawks, he led the team to a 23–2–1 record.

=== Basketball ===
Johnson debuted for the Jayhawks basketball team in December 1908 after finishing the football season. He was credited with introducing the forward pass to basketball which was a move he utilised on the football team. By catching the basketball at the lacing, Johnson was able to throw it from one side of the court to the other which was considered "an entirely new departure in the game." Johnson was chosen as an All-American for his play in 1909. It was the first nationally recognized individual athletic award in Jayhawks history. Johnson was named as team captain for the 1909–10 season.

Prior to the start of the 1910–11 season, Johnson announced that he would relinquish his remaining amateur status to become a professional basketball coach and referee in December 1910. He reported to the basketball team at the start of January 1911 after it was revealed that his work did not result in the loss of his amateur standing. On January 24, Johnson decided to withdraw from any further participation in Jayhawks athletics.

=== Other sports ===
Johnson also played for the Jayhawks baseball team and was a member of the track and field team. The Missouri Valley Conference passed a ruling that no player could participate in more than two sports so Johnson chose to commit to football and basketball while he dropped his other athletic pursuits.

== Death ==
Johnson suffered an injury to his back in a basketball game against the Saint Louis Billikens which was to be the start of his health decline. In the final game of the 1910 football season against the Missouri Tigers, Johnson was squashed between two Tiger defenders and re-aggravated a kidney condition that had plagued him since his childhood. His injury meant that he was unable to play basketball during the 1910–11 season and his health steadily deteriorated over the next year.

On October 10, 1911, Johnson was taken to the University Hospital for treatment for severe kidney trouble. Surgeons believed that tubercular bacilli were confined to a single kidney and believed that cutting away part of his organ would be sufficient for recovery. Subsequent microscopic examinations revealed that the tubercular area had spread to several organs and intestinal tracts so the surgeons abandoned the idea of operating.

On November 24, 1911, Johnson died in hospital due to tuberculosis of the liver. His mother, Francis Lupher, and brother, Edward Johnson, were at his bedside when he died.

== Legacy ==
In an obituary published in the Lawrence Journal-World, Johnson was called "the most famous athlete that the University of Kansas, has ever known from an individual standpoint." In 1935, the University of Kansas honored Johnson at halftime of the Homecoming game against the Missouri Tigers where teammates celebrated him as the best athlete in Jayhawks history.

In 1939, the University Daily Kansan ranked Johnson third in its poll for the greatest Jayhawks athletes behind Jim Bausch and Glenn Cunningham. By the end of the century, Johnson's legacy had been relegated; he was not listed in the top 10 athletes of the past 100 years in a 1999 ranking by the University Daily Kansan.
