= 1910 Iowa Hawkeyes football team =

American college football season

1910 Iowa Hawkeyes football

Iowa state champion
- Conference: Missouri Valley Conference, Western Conference
- Record: 5–2 (0–1 MVC, 1–1 Western)
- Head coach: Jesse Hawley (1st season)
- Captain: Mike Hyland
- Home stadium: Iowa Field

1910 Missouri Valley Conference football standings
	Conf.					Overall
Team	W		L		T	W		L		T
Nebraska $	2	–	0	–	0	7	–	1	–	0
Iowa	3	–	1	–	0	5	–	2	–	0
Missouri	2	–	1	–	1	4	–	2	–	2
Iowa State	2	–	2	–	0	4	–	4	–	0
Kansas	1	–	1	–	1	6	–	1	–	1
Washington University	0	–	2	–	0	3	–	4	–	0
Drake	0	–	3	–	0	3	–	5	–	0
$ – Conference champion

1910 Western Conference football standings
	Conf.					Overall
Team	W		L		T	W		L		T
Illinois +	4	–	0	–	0	7	–	0	–	0
Minnesota +	2	–	0	–	0	6	–	1	–	0
Indiana	3	–	1	–	0	5	–	1	–	0
Iowa	1	–	1	–	0	5	–	2	–	0
Wisconsin	1	–	2	–	1	1	–	2	–	2
Northwestern	1	–	2	–	1	1	–	3	–	1
Chicago	2	–	4	–	0	2	–	5	–	0
Purdue	0	–	4	–	0	1	–	5	–	0
+ – Conference co-champions

The 1910 Iowa Hawkeyes football team was an American football team that represented the State University of Iowa ("S.U.I"), now commonly known as the University of Iowa, as a member of both the Missouri Valley Conference (MVC) and the Western Conference during the 1910 college football season. In their first year under head coach Jesse Hawley, the Hawkeyes compiled a 5–2 record, shut out five of seven opponents, and outscored all opponents by a total of 94 to 15. They finished in second place in the MVC with a 3–1 record in conference games. In the Western Conference, they finished in fourth place with a 1–1 record in conference games. With victories over Morningside, Iowa State, and Drake, the Hawkeyes claimed the undisputed championship of Iowa.

On November 5, 1910, Iowa defeated Iowa State by a 2–0 score, the only points being scored on a safety as Iowa State fumbled while trying to kick from behind its goal. It remains the lowest scoring game in Iowa football history.

Mike Hyland, who played at the end and fullback positions, was the team captain. Playing at the tackle position from 1909 to 1911, Archie Alexander was the second African-American to play football at Iowa. (Frank Kinney Holbrook was the first.)

The team played its home games at Iowa Field in Iowa City, Iowa.

== Schedule ==
Date	Time	Opponent	Site	Result	Attendance	Source
October 4		Morningside*	Iowa Field; Iowa City, IA	W 12–0		
October 8		at Northwestern	Northwestern Field; Evanston, IL	L 5–10		
October 15		at Missouri	Rollins Field; Columbia, MO	L 0–5		
October 22		Purdue	Iowa Field; Iowa City, IA	W 16–0		
November 5		at Iowa State	State Field; Ames, IA (rivalry)	W 2–0		
November 12		Drake	Iowa Field; Iowa City, IA	W 21–0		
November 19	2:45 p.m.	at Washington University	Francis Field; St. Louis, MO	W 38–0	2,000	
*Non-conference game

== Players ==
The following players received major varsity letters for the participation on the 1910 football team:

- Archie Alexander, tackle
- Oscar Benton, halfback
- George Buckley, end
- Homer Clemons, tackle/center
- Paul Curry, quarterback
- Hans Hoerlein, end
- Mike Hyland, fullback/end
- James Murphy, halfback
- Milo Neidig, tackle
- John Ney, tackle
- Willis O'Brien, center
- Maurice Repass, guard
- Floyd Thomas, halfback
- Jim Trickey, guard/fullback
- Seth Weeks, guard
