= 1911 Illinois Fighting Illini football team =

American college football season

1911 Illinois Fighting Illini football
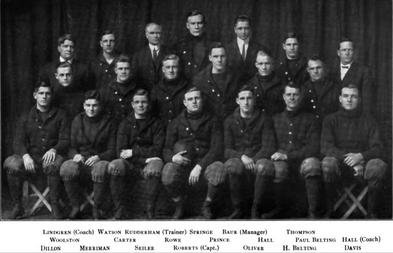
- Conference: Western Conference
- Record: 4–2–1 (2–2–1 Western)
- Head coach: Arthur R. Hall (6th season)
- Captain: Chester C. Roberts
- Home stadium: Illinois Field

1911 Western Conference football standings
	Conf.					Overall
Team	W		L		T	W		L		T
Minnesota $	3	–	0	–	1	6	–	0	–	1
Chicago	5	–	1	–	0	6	–	1	–	0
Wisconsin	2	–	1	–	1	5	–	1	–	1
Illinois	2	–	2	–	1	4	–	2	–	1
Iowa	2	–	2	–	0	3	–	4	–	0
Purdue	1	–	3	–	0	3	–	4	–	0
Northwestern	1	–	4	–	0	3	–	4	–	0
Indiana	0	–	3	–	1	3	–	3	–	1
$ – Conference champion

The 1911 Illinois Fighting Illini football team was an American football team that represented the University of Illinois during the 1911 college football season. In their sixth season under head coach Arthur R. Hall, the Illini compiled a 4–2–1 record and finished in fourth place in the Western Conference. Halfback Chester C. Roberts was the team captain.

== Schedule ==
Date	Opponent	Site	Result	Attendance	Source
October 7	Millikin*	Illinois Field; Champaign, IL	W 33–0		
October 14	Saint Louis*	Illinois Field; Champaign, IL	W 9–0		
October 21	at Chicago	Marshall Field; Chicago, IL	L 0–24		
November 4	Purdue	Illinois Field; Champaign, IL (rivalry)	W 12–3		
November 11	vs. Indiana	Jordan Field; Indianapolis, IN (rivalry)	T 0–0		
November 18	Northwestern	Illinois Field; Champaign, IL (rivalry)	W 27–13		
November 25	Minnesota	Illinois Field; Champaign, IL	L 0–11	10,000	
*Non-conference game

== Awards and honors ==
- Chauncey Oliver, end

- Selected by Outing magazine for its "Football Honor List for 1911" selected by coaches from the East and West.

- Paul Belting, guard

- Outing magazine "Football Honor List for 1911"
