= 1910 Indiana Hoosiers football team =

American college football season

1910 Indiana Hoosiers football
- Conference: Western Conference
- Record: 6–1 (3–1 Western)
- Head coach: James M. Sheldon (6th season)
- Captain: Arthur Berndt
- Home stadium: Jordan Field

1910 Western Conference football standings
	Conf.					Overall
Team	W		L		T	W		L		T
Illinois +	4	–	0	–	0	7	–	0	–	0
Minnesota +	2	–	0	–	0	6	–	1	–	0
Indiana	3	–	1	–	0	5	–	1	–	0
Iowa	1	–	1	–	0	5	–	2	–	0
Wisconsin	1	–	2	–	1	1	–	2	–	2
Northwestern	1	–	2	–	1	1	–	3	–	1
Chicago	2	–	4	–	0	2	–	5	–	0
Purdue	0	–	4	–	0	1	–	5	–	0
+ – Conference co-champions

The 1910 Indiana Hoosiers football team was an American football team that represented Indiana University Bloomington during the 1910 college football season. In their sixth season under head coach James M. Sheldon, the Hoosiers compiled a 6–1 record, finished in third place in the Western Conference, shut out five of seven opponents, and outscored all opponents by a combined total of 111 to 6.

== Schedule ==
Date	Opponent	Site	Result	Source
October 1	DePauw*	Jordan Field; Bloomington, IN	W 12–0	
October 8	at Chicago	Marshall Field; Chicago, IL	W 6–0	
October 15	Millikin*	Jordan Field; Bloomington, IN	W 34–0	
October 22	vs. Wisconsin	Washington Park; Indianapolis, IN	W 12–3	
October 29	Butler*	Jordan Field; Bloomington, IN	W 33–0	
November 5	Illinois	Jordan Field; Bloomington, IN (rivalry)	L 0–3	
November 19	at Purdue	Stuart Field; West Lafayette, IN (rivalry)	W 15–0	
*Non-conference game
