= 1910 Purdue Boilermakers football team =

American college football season

1910 Purdue Boilermakers football
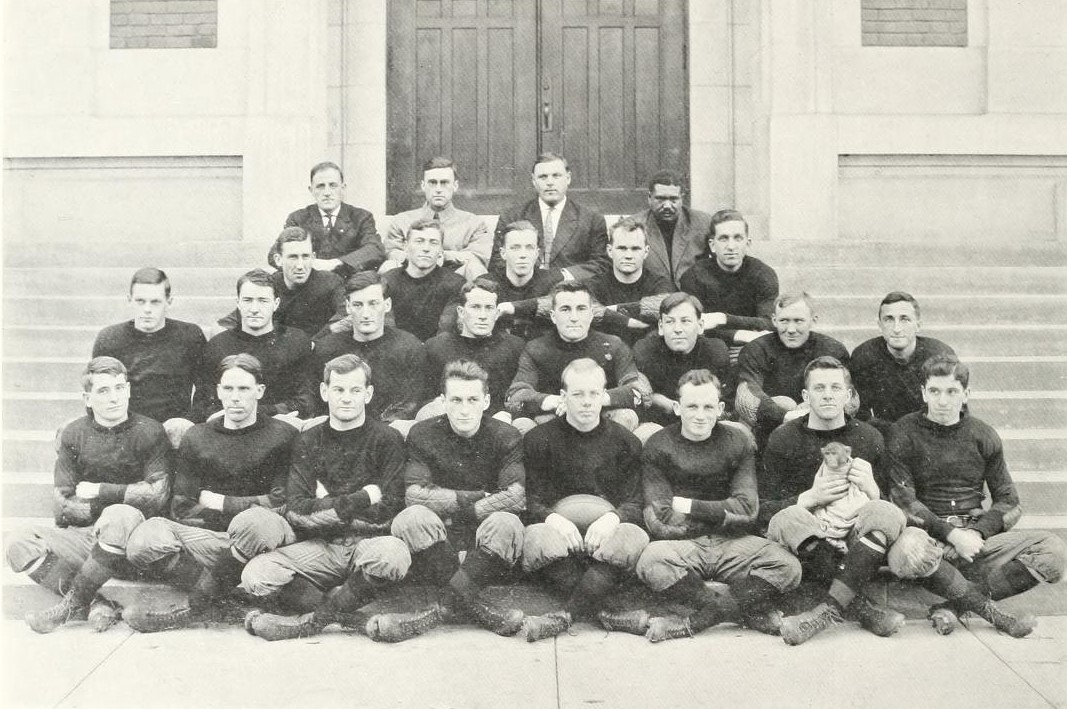
- Conference: Western Conference
- Record: 1–5 (0–4 Western)
- Head coach: Bill Horr (1st season)
- Captain: H. G. Fletcher
- Home stadium: Stuart Field

1910 Western Conference football standings
	Conf.					Overall
Team	W		L		T	W		L		T
Illinois +	4	–	0	–	0	7	–	0	–	0
Minnesota +	2	–	0	–	0	6	–	1	–	0
Indiana	3	–	1	–	0	5	–	1	–	0
Iowa	1	–	1	–	0	5	–	2	–	0
Wisconsin	1	–	2	–	1	1	–	2	–	2
Northwestern	1	–	2	–	1	1	–	3	–	1
Chicago	2	–	4	–	0	2	–	5	–	0
Purdue	0	–	4	–	0	1	–	5	–	0
+ – Conference co-champions

The 1910 Purdue Boilermakers football team was an American football team that represented Purdue University during the 1910 college football season. In their first season under head coach Bill Horr, the Boilermakers compiled a 1–5 record, finished in last place in the Western Conference with an 0–4 record against conference opponents, and were outscored by their opponents by a total of 65 to 19. H. G. Fletcher was the team captain.

== Schedule ==
Date	Opponent	Site	Result	Attendance	Source
October 8	Wabash*	Stuart Field; West Lafayette, IN	L 0–3		
October 22	at Iowa	Iowa Field; Iowa City, IA	L 0–16		
October 29	Illinois	Stuart Field; West Lafayette, IN (rivalry)	L 0–11		
November 5	at Chicago	Stagg Field; Chicago, IL (rivalry)	L 5–14		
November 12	DePauw*	Stuart Field; West Lafayette, IN	W 14–6		
November 19	Indiana	West Lafayette, IN (Old Oaken Bucket)	L 0–15		
*Non-conference game

== Roster ==
- William Bowman, G
- H. A. Carter, FB
- G. H. Fletcher, QB
- C. D. Franks, T
- Frank Hanna, E
- W. V. Heekin, HB
- Don Miles, E
- Thaddeus Reese, T
- L. W. Shenefield, G
- R. W. Tavey, HB
