= 1910 Wisconsin Badgers football team =

American college football season

1910 Wisconsin Badgers football
- Conference: Western Conference
- Record: 1–2–2 (1–2–1 Western)
- Head coach: Thomas A. Barry (3rd season)
- Captain: James P. Dean
- Home stadium: Randall Field

1910 Western Conference football standings
	Conf.					Overall
Team	W		L		T	W		L		T
Illinois +	4	–	0	–	0	7	–	0	–	0
Minnesota +	2	–	0	–	0	6	–	1	–	0
Indiana	3	–	1	–	0	5	–	1	–	0
Iowa	1	–	1	–	0	5	–	2	–	0
Wisconsin	1	–	2	–	1	1	–	2	–	2
Northwestern	1	–	2	–	1	1	–	3	–	1
Chicago	2	–	4	–	0	2	–	5	–	0
Purdue	0	–	4	–	0	1	–	5	–	0
+ – Conference co-champions

The 1910 Wisconsin Badgers football team represented the University of Wisconsin as a member of the Western Conference during the 1910 college football season. Led by Thomas A. Barry in his third and final season as head coach, the Badgers compiled an overall record of 1–2–2 with a mark of 1–2–1 in conference play, tying for fifth place in the Western Conference. The team's captain was James P. Dean.

== Schedule ==
Date	Opponent	Site	Result	Attendance
October 8	Lawrence*	Randall Field; Madison, WI	T 6–6	
October 22	vs. Indiana	Washington Park; Indianapolis, IN	L 3–12	
October 29	Northwestern	Randall Field; Madison, WI	T 0–0	
November 12	at Minnesota	Northrop Field; Minneapolis, MN (rivalry)	L 0–28	18,000
November 19	Chicago^{†}	Randall Field; Madison, WI	W 10–0	
*Non-conference game; ^{†}Homecoming
