= 1911 Minnesota Golden Gophers football team =

American college football season

1911 Minnesota Golden Gophers football

National champion (Billingsley) Western Conference champion
- Conference: Western Conference
- Record: 6–0–1 (3–0–1 Western)
- Head coach: Henry L. Williams (12th season)
- Captain: Earle T. Pickering
- Home stadium: Northrop Field

1911 Western Conference football standings
| | Conf. | | | | | Overall |
| Team | W | | L | | T | W | | L | | T |
|---|---|---|---|---|---|---|---|---|---|---|
| Minnesota $ | 3 | – | 0 | – | 1 | 6 | – | 0 | – | 1 |
| Chicago | 5 | – | 1 | – | 0 | 6 | – | 1 | – | 0 |
| Wisconsin | 2 | – | 1 | – | 1 | 5 | – | 1 | – | 1 |
| Illinois | 2 | – | 2 | – | 1 | 4 | – | 2 | – | 1 |
| Iowa | 2 | – | 2 | – | 0 | 3 | – | 4 | – | 0 |
| Purdue | 1 | – | 3 | – | 0 | 3 | – | 4 | – | 0 |
| Northwestern | 1 | – | 4 | – | 0 | 3 | – | 4 | – | 0 |
| Indiana | 0 | – | 3 | – | 1 | 3 | – | 3 | – | 1 |
$ – Conference champion

The 1911 Minnesota Golden Gophers football team was an American football team that represented the University of Minnesota in the Western Conference during the 1911 college football season. In their 12th year under head coach Henry L. Williams, the Golden Gophers compiled a 6–0–1 record (2–0–1 against Western Conference opponents), won the conference championship for the third consecutive year, and outscored their opponents by a combined total of 102 to 15. The team has been recognized retroactively as the national champion by the Billingsley Report.

Center Clifford Morrell and halfback Reuben Rosenwald were named All-Big Ten first team.

== Schedule ==
| Date | Time | Opponent | Site | Result | Attendance | Source |
|---|---|---|---|---|---|---|
| September 30 | | Iowa State* | Northrop Field; Minneapolis, MN | W 5–0 | 3,000 | |
| October 7 | 3:00 p.m. | South Dakota* | Northrop Field; Minneapolis, MN | W 5–0 | 3,500 | |
| October 21 | | Nebraska* | Northrop Field; Minneapolis, MN (rivalry) | W 21–3 | 10,000 | |
| October 28 | | Iowa | Northrop Field; Minneapolis, MN (rivalry) | W 24–6 | 5,000 | |
| November 4 | | Chicago | Northrop Field; Minneapolis, MN | W 30–0 | 20,000 | |
| November 18 | | at Wisconsin | Randall Field; Madison, WI (rivalry) | T 6–6 | 15,000 | |
| November 25 | | at Illinois | Illinois Field; Champaign, IL | W 11–0 | 10,000 | |
*Non-conference game
