= 1910 Washington University Pikers football team =

American college football season

1910 Washington University Pikers football
- Conference: Missouri Valley Conference
- Record: 3–4 (0–2 MVC)
- Head coach: Frank Cayou (3rd season)
- Captain: Hartling
- Home stadium: Francis Field

1910 Missouri Valley Conference football standings
	Conf.					Overall
Team	W		L		T	W		L		T
Nebraska $	2	–	0	–	0	7	–	1	–	0
Iowa	3	–	1	–	0	5	–	2	–	0
Missouri	2	–	1	–	1	4	–	2	–	2
Iowa State	2	–	2	–	0	4	–	4	–	0
Kansas	1	–	1	–	1	6	–	1	–	1
Washington University	0	–	2	–	0	3	–	4	–	0
Drake	0	–	3	–	0	3	–	5	–	0
$ – Conference champion

The 1910 Washington University Pikers football team represented Washington University in St. Louis as a member of the Missouri Valley Conference (MVC) during the 1910 college football season. Led by third-year head coach Frank Cayou, the Pikers compiled an overall record of 3–4 with a mark of 0–2 in conference play, placing sixth in the MVC. Washington University played home games at Francis Field in St. Louis.

== Schedule ==
Date	Time	Opponent	Site	Result	Attendance	Source
October 8	3:00 p.m.	Shurtleff*	Francis Field; St. Louis, MO	L 6–11	600	
October 15	3:00 p.m.	Westminster (MO)*	Francis Field; St. Louis, MO	W 31–6		
October 22	3:00 p.m.	Rose Polytechnic*	Francis Field; St. Louis, MO	W 6–0		
October 29	3:00 p.m.	Drury*	Francis Field; St. Louis, MO	W 32–6		
November 5	2:45 p.m.	Arkansas*	Francis Field; St. Louis, MO	L 0–50	2,000	
November 12	3:00 p.m.	at Missouri	Rollins Field; Columbia, MO	L 3–27	2,400	
November 19	2:45 p.m.	Iowa*	Francis Field; St. Louis, MO	L 0–38	2,000	
*Non-conference game
