= 1910 Minnesota Golden Gophers football team =

American college football season

1910 Minnesota Golden Gophers football

Western Conference co-champion
- Conference: Western Conference
- Record: 6–1 (2–0 Western)
- Head coach: Henry L. Williams (11th season)
- Captain: Lisle Johnston
- Home stadium: Northrop Field

1910 Western Conference football standings
	Conf.					Overall
Team	W		L		T	W		L		T
Illinois +	4	–	0	–	0	7	–	0	–	0
Minnesota +	2	–	0	–	0	6	–	1	–	0
Indiana	3	–	1	–	0	5	–	1	–	0
Iowa	1	–	1	–	0	5	–	2	–	0
Wisconsin	1	–	2	–	1	1	–	2	–	2
Northwestern	1	–	2	–	1	1	–	3	–	1
Chicago	2	–	4	–	0	2	–	5	–	0
Purdue	0	–	4	–	0	1	–	5	–	0
+ – Conference co-champions

The 1910 Minnesota Golden Gophers football team represented the University of Minnesota in the 1910 college football season. In their 11th season under head coach Henry L. Williams, the Golden Gophers compiled a 6–1 record (2–0 against Western Conference opponents), won the conference championship, shut out their first six opponents, and outscored all opponents by a combined total of 179 to 6. The team lost only one game, falling to Michigan, 6–0, in the final game of the season.

Tackle James Walker was named an All-American by Walter Camp. Fullback Lisle Johnston, quarterback John McGovern, halfback Reuben Rosenwald and tackle James Walker were named All-Big Ten first team.

== Schedule ==
Date	Opponent	Site	Result	Attendance
September 24	Lawrence*	Northrop Field; Minneapolis, MN	W 34–0	4,000
October 1	South Dakota*	Northrop Field; Minneapolis, MN	W 17–0	5,000
October 8	Iowa State*	Northrop Field; Minneapolis, MN	W 49–0	8,000
October 15	Nebraska*	Northrop Field; Minneapolis, MN (rivalry)	W 27–0	15,000
October 29	at Chicago	Marshall Field; Chicago, IL	W 24–0	
November 12	Wisconsin	Northrop Field; Minneapolis, MN (rivalry)	W 28–0	18,000
November 19	at Michigan*	Ferry Field; Ann Arbor, MI (Little Brown Jug)	L 0–6	18,000
*Non-conference game
