= 1910 Drake Bulldogs football team =

American college football season

1910 Drake Bulldogs football
- Conference: Missouri Valley Conference
- Record: 3–5 (0–2 MVC)
- Head coach: John L. Griffith (3rd season)
- Home stadium: Haskins Field

1910 Missouri Valley Conference football standings
	Conf.					Overall
Team	W		L		T	W		L		T
Nebraska $	2	–	0	–	0	7	–	1	–	0
Iowa	3	–	1	–	0	5	–	2	–	0
Missouri	2	–	1	–	1	4	–	2	–	2
Iowa State	2	–	2	–	0	4	–	4	–	0
Kansas	1	–	1	–	1	6	–	1	–	1
Washington University	0	–	2	–	0	3	–	4	–	0
Drake	0	–	3	–	0	3	–	5	–	0
$ – Conference champion

The 1910 Drake Bulldogs football team was an American football team that represented Drake University in the Missouri Valley Conference (MVC) during the 1910 college football season. In their third season under head coach John L. Griffith, the team compiled a 3–5 record (0–2 against MVC opponents).

== Schedule ==
Date	Opponent	Site	Result	Source
October 1	Des Moines Baptist*	Des Moines, IA	L 5–6	
October 8	at Illinois*	Illinois Field; Champaign, IL	L 0–29	
October 15	Coe*	Des Moines, IA	W 22–0	
October 22	Kansas	Des Moines, IA	L 0–6	
October 29	Simpson (IA)*	Des Moines, IA	W 3–0	
November 5	Grinnell*	Des Moines, IA	W 13–9	
November 12	at Iowa	Iowa Field; Iowa City, IA	L 0-21	
November 25	Iowa State	Des Moines, IA	L 0–2	
*Non-conference game
