= 1911 All-Western college football team =

American all-star college football team

The 1911 All-Western college football team consists of American football players selected to the All-Western teams chosen by various selectors for the 1911 college football season.

== All-Western selections ==
=== Ends ===
- Stanfield Wells, Michigan (AX, CEP, ECP-1, EWC, GWA, LGS, SFE, SJ, WE)
- Joseph Hoeffel, Wisconsin (EWC, LGS, SFE, WE)
- Paul Harold Tobin, Minnesota (AX, ECP-2, GWA)
- Knute Rockne, Notre Dame (SJ)
- Chauncey B. Oliver, Illinois (ECP-2)

=== Tackles ===
- Alfred L. Buser, Wisconsin (AX, CEP, ECP-1, EWC [guard], GWA, SFE)
- Frederick L. Conklin, Michigan (AX, ECP-2, EWC, GWA, LGS, WE)
- Charles M. Rademacher, Chicago (CEP, ECP-1, LGS, SFE, WE)
- Leonard Frank, Minnesota (ECP-2)

=== Guards ===
- Horace F. Scruby, Chicago (CEP, ECP-1, EWC, GWA, LGS, SFE, WE)
- Sylvester V. Shonka, Nebraska (AX, CEP, ECP-2, EWC [tackle], SFE, SJ [tackle], WE)
- Lucius A. Smith, Minnesota (ECP-1, LGS, SJ)
- Charles H. Belting, Illinois (AX, GWA)
- Charles J. Robinson, Minnesota (SJ)
- Paul Belting, Illinois (ECP-2)

=== Centers ===
- Willis "Fat" O'Brien, Iowa (AX, CEP, GWA, LGS, SFE, SJ)
- Clifford F. Morrell, Minnesota (ECP-1, EWC, WE)
- R. E. Branstad, Wisconsin (ECP-2)

=== Quarterbacks ===
- John "Keckie" Moll, Wisconsin (AX, CEP, ECP-2, EWC, GWA, LGS, SJ, WE)
- Thomas Andrew Gill, Indiana (SFE)
- Eddie Gillette, Wisconsin (ECP-1)

=== Halfbacks ===
- Reuben Martin Rosenwald, Minnesota (AX, CEP [fullback], ECP-1, GWA, LGS, SFE, SJ, WE)
- Clark Sauer, Chicago (AX [fullback], CEP, ECP-1, GWA [fullback], LGS, SFE, WE)
- James B. Craig, Michigan (AX, CEP, ECP-2, EWC, GWA)
- Owen A. Frank, Nebraska (EWC, SJ [tackle])
- Lewis C. Stevens, Minnesota (ECP-2, SJ)

=== Fullbacks ===
- George C. Thomson, Michigan (ECP-1, EWC, SFE, WE)
- Ralph Capron, Minnesota (CEP [end], ECP-1 [end], LGS, SJ)
- Stanley R. Pierce, Chicago (ECP-2)

== Key ==
Bold = consensus choice by a majority of the selectors

AX = G. W. Axelson

CEP = Chicago Evening Post

ECP = E. C. Patterson of Collier's Weekly

EWC = Edward W. Cochrane, sporting editor of Kansas City Journal

GWA = G. W. Axelson, sporting editor of Chicago Record-Herald

LGS = L. G. Sullivan, sporting editor of Chicago Daily News

SJ = Edgar L. Shave and John L. Johnson in the St. Paul Daily News

WE = Walter Eckersall

SFE = San Francisco Examiner

== See also ==
- 1911 College Football All-America Team
