= 1910 Missouri Tigers football team =

American college football season

1910 Missouri Tigers football
- Conference: Missouri Valley Conference
- Record: 4–2–2 (2–1–1 MVC)
- Head coach: Bill Hollenback (1st season)
- Captain: Frank B Thacher
- Home stadium: Rollins Field

1910 Missouri Valley Conference football standings
	Conf.					Overall
Team	W		L		T	W		L		T
Nebraska $	2	–	0	–	0	7	–	1	–	0
Iowa	3	–	1	–	0	5	–	2	–	0
Missouri	2	–	1	–	1	4	–	2	–	2
Iowa State	2	–	2	–	0	4	–	4	–	0
Kansas	1	–	1	–	1	6	–	1	–	1
Washington University	0	–	2	–	0	3	–	4	–	0
Drake	0	–	3	–	0	3	–	5	–	0
$ – Conference champion

The 1910 Missouri Tigers football team was an American football team that represented the University of Missouri in the Missouri Valley Conference (MVC) during the 1910 college football season. The team compiled a 4–2–2 record (2–1–1 against MVC opponents) and outscored all opponents by a combined total of 77 to 17. Bill Hollenback was the head coach for his first and only season. The team played its home games at Rollins Field in Columbia, Missouri.

== Schedule ==
Date	Time	Opponent	Site	Result	Attendance	Source
September 30		Monmouth (IL)*	Rollins Field; Columbia, MO	W 9–0		
October 8		Missouri Mines*	Rollins Field; Columbia, MO	T 0–0		
October 15		Iowa	Rollins Field; Columbia, MO	W 5–0		
October 22		at Iowa State	Ames, IA (rivalry)	L 5–6		
October 28		vs. Oklahoma	Joplin, MO (rivalry)	W 26–0		
November 5	2:30 p.m.	at Saint Louis*	Sportsman's Park; St. Louis, MO	L 0–3	8,000	
November 12	3:00 p.m.	Washington University	Rollins Field; Columbia, MO	W 27–3	3:00 p.m.	
November 24	2:00 p.m.	Kansas	Gordon and Koppel Field; Kansas City, MO (rivalry)	T 5–5	20,000	
*Non-conference game
