= Mike Hyland =

American sports coach, lawyer (1886–1958)

Biographical details
- Born: September 26, 1886; Des Moines, Iowa, U.S.
- Died: April 14, 1958 (aged 71); Marshalltown, Iowa, U.S.

Playing career

Football
- 1908–1910: Iowa

Basketball
- 1908–1909: Iowa

Track and field
- c. 1909: Iowa

Coaching career (HC unless noted)

Football
- 1911–1913: Leander Clark
- 1915–1916: Highland Park (IA)
- 1923: Grinnell (line)
- 1924–1926: Grinnell

Basketball
- 1911–1914: Leander Clark
- 1926–1927: Grinnell

Administrative career (AD unless noted)
- 1911–1914: Leander Clark

Mark William "Mike" Hyland IV (September 26, 1886 – April 14, 1958) was an American football and basketball player and coach, athletics administrator, and lawyer. He served as the head football coach at Leander Clark College in Toledo, Iowa from 1911 to 1913, Highland Park College in Des Moines, Iowa from 1915 to 1916, and Grinnell College in Grinnell, Iowa from 1924 to 1926. Hyland played college football at the University of Iowa, lettering from 1908 to 1910.

Hyland was born on September 26, 1886, in Des Moines, Iowa. Hyland graduated from the University of Iowa College of Law in 1911. That year, he was hired as the coach and athletic director at Leander Clark. In 1915, he was appointed head football coach at Highland Park. Hyland joined the football coaching staff as line coach at Grinnell late in 1923 season. The next year he was named head football coach at Grinnell.

Hyland practiced law in Tama, Iowa. He died on April 14, 1958, at a hospital in Marshalltown, Iowa.

== Head coaching record ==
=== Football ===
Year	Team	Overall	Conference	Standing
Grinnell Pioneers (Missouri Valley Conference) (1924–1926)
1924	Grinnell	3–3	2–1	4th
1925	Grinnell	3–3–2	2–2–1	T–5th
1926	Grinnell	6–1–1	3–1–1	4th
Grinnell:		12–7–3	7–4–2	
Total:				
