= 1911 Northwestern Purple football team =

American college football season

1911 Northwestern Purple football
- Conference: Western Conference
- Record: 3–4 (1–4 Western)
- Head coach: Charles Hammett (2nd season)
- Captain: Ernest A. Reese
- Home stadium: Northwestern Field

1911 Western Conference football standings
	Conf.					Overall
Team	W		L		T	W		L		T
Minnesota $	3	–	0	–	1	6	–	0	–	1
Chicago	5	–	1	–	0	6	–	1	–	0
Wisconsin	2	–	1	–	1	5	–	1	–	1
Illinois	2	–	2	–	1	4	–	2	–	1
Iowa	2	–	2	–	0	3	–	4	–	0
Purdue	1	–	3	–	0	3	–	4	–	0
Northwestern	1	–	4	–	0	3	–	4	–	0
Indiana	0	–	3	–	1	3	–	3	–	1
$ – Conference champion

The 1911 Northwestern Purple team represented Northwestern University during the 1911 college football season. In their second year under head coach Charles Hammett, the Purple compiled a 3–4 record (1–4 against Western Conference opponents) and finished in seventh place in the Western Conference.

== Schedule ==
Date	Opponent	Site	Result	Source
October 7	Monmouth (IL)*	Northwestern Field; Evanston, IL	W 26–0	
October 14	Illinois Wesleyan*	Northwestern Field; Evanston, IL	W 10–0	
October 21	Indiana	Northwestern Field; Evanston, IL	W 5–0	
October 28	Wisconsin	Northwestern Field; Evanston, IL	L 3–28	
November 11	Chicago	Northwestern Field; Evanston, IL	L 3–9	
November 18	at Illinois	Illinois Field; Champaign, IL (rivalry)	L 13–27	
November 25	at Iowa	Iowa Field; Iowa City, IA	L 0–6	
*Non-conference game
