= 1911 Wisconsin Badgers football team =

American college football season

1911 Wisconsin Badgers football
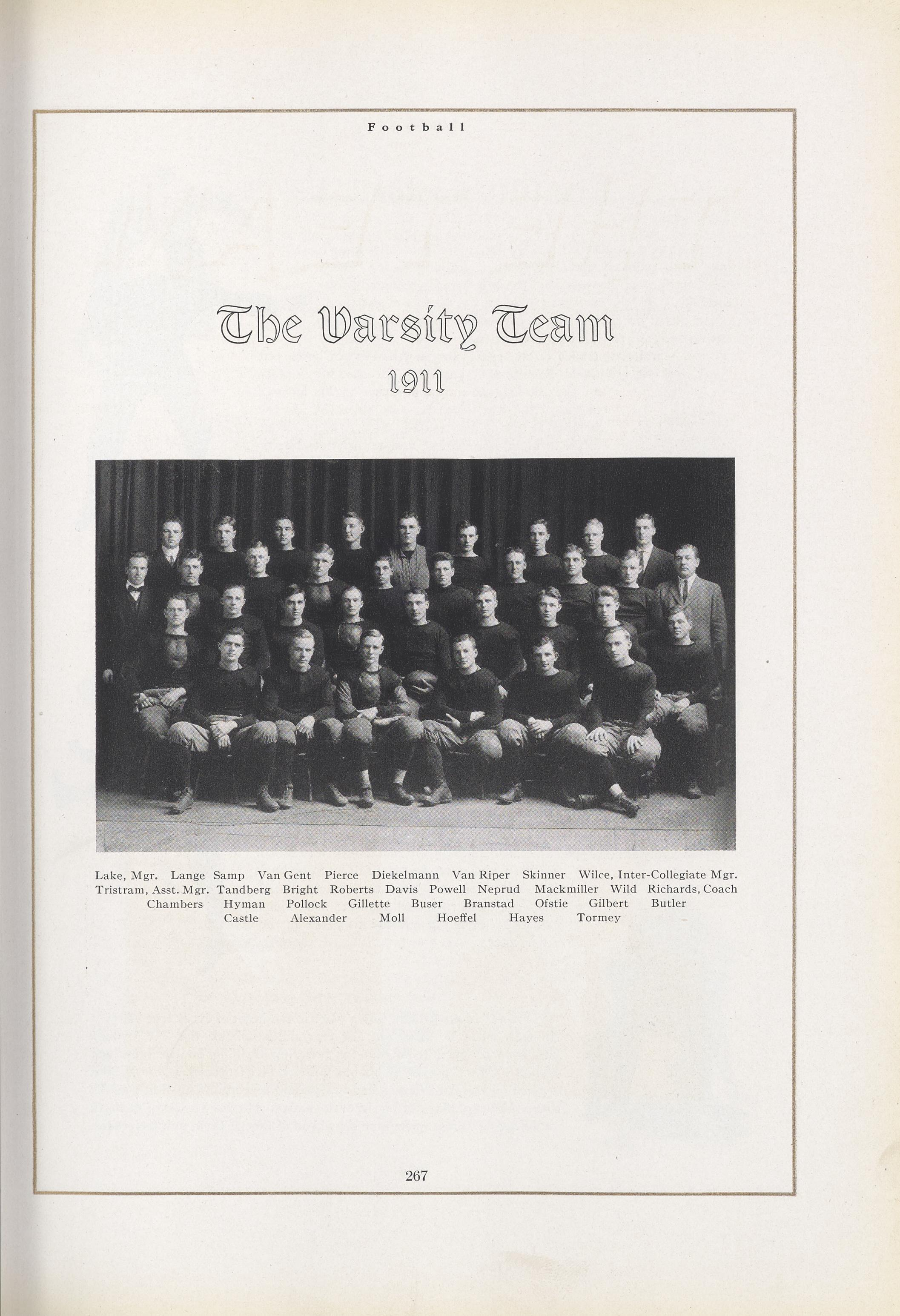
- Conference: Western Conference
- Record: 5–1–1 (2–1–1 Western)
- Head coach: John R. Richards (1st season)
- Captain: Alfred L. Buser
- Home stadium: Randall Field

1911 Western Conference football standings
| | Conf. | | | | | Overall |
| Team | W | | L | | T | W | | L | | T |
|---|---|---|---|---|---|---|---|---|---|---|
| Minnesota $ | 3 | – | 0 | – | 1 | 6 | – | 0 | – | 1 |
| Chicago | 5 | – | 1 | – | 0 | 6 | – | 1 | – | 0 |
| Wisconsin | 2 | – | 1 | – | 1 | 5 | – | 1 | – | 1 |
| Illinois | 2 | – | 2 | – | 1 | 4 | – | 2 | – | 1 |
| Iowa | 2 | – | 2 | – | 0 | 3 | – | 4 | – | 0 |
| Purdue | 1 | – | 3 | – | 0 | 3 | – | 4 | – | 0 |
| Northwestern | 1 | – | 4 | – | 0 | 3 | – | 4 | – | 0 |
| Indiana | 0 | – | 3 | – | 1 | 3 | – | 3 | – | 1 |
$ – Conference champion

The 1911 Wisconsin Badgers football team represented the University of Wisconsin as a member of the Western Conference during the 1911 college football season. Led first-year head coach John R. Richards, the Badgers compiled an overall record of 5–1–1 with a mark of 2–1–1 in conference play, placing third in the Western Conference. The team's captain was Alfred L. Buser.

== Schedule ==
| Date | Opponent | Site | Result | Attendance | Source |
|---|---|---|---|---|---|
| October 7 | Lawrence* | Randall Field; Madison, WI | W 15–0 | | |
| October 14 | Ripon* | Randall Field; Madison, WI | W 24–0 | | |
| October 21 | Colorado College* | Randall Field; Madison, WI | W 26–0 | | |
| October 28 | at Northwestern | Northwestern Field; Evanston, IL | W 28–3 | | |
| November 4 | Iowa | Randall Field; Madison, WI (rivalry) | W 12–0 | | |
| November 18 | Minnesota^{†} | Randall Field; Madison, WI (rivalry) | T 6–6 | 15,000 | |
| November 25 | at Chicago | Marshall Field; Chicago, IL | L 0–5 | | |
*Non-conference game; ^{†}Homecoming
