= 1910 Northwestern Purple football team =

American college football season

1910 Northwestern Purple football
- Conference: Western Conference
- Record: 1–3–1 (1–2–1 Western)
- Head coach: Charles Hammett (1st season)
- Captain: John Manley
- Home stadium: Northwestern Field

1910 Western Conference football standings
	Conf.					Overall
Team	W		L		T	W		L		T
Illinois +	4	–	0	–	0	7	–	0	–	0
Minnesota +	2	–	0	–	0	6	–	1	–	0
Indiana	3	–	1	–	0	5	–	1	–	0
Iowa	1	–	1	–	0	5	–	2	–	0
Wisconsin	1	–	2	–	1	1	–	2	–	2
Northwestern	1	–	2	–	1	1	–	3	–	1
Chicago	2	–	4	–	0	2	–	5	–	0
Purdue	0	–	4	–	0	1	–	5	–	0
+ – Conference co-champions

The 1910 Northwestern Purple team represented Northwestern University during the 1910 college football season. In their first year under head coach Charles Hammett, the Purple compiled a 1–3–1 record (1–2–1 against Western Conference opponents) and finished in a tie for sixth place in the Western Conference.

== Schedule ==
Date	Opponent	Site	Result	Source
October 1	Illinois Wesleyan	Northwestern Field; Evanston, IL	L 0–3	
October 8	Iowa	Northwestern Field; Evanston, IL	W 10–5	
October 22	at Chicago	Marshall Field; Chicago, IL	L 0–10	
October 29	at Wisconsin	Randall Field; Madison, WI	T 0–0	
November 12	Illinois	Northwestern Field; Evanston, IL (rivalry)	L 0–27	
