= 1910 Iowa State Cyclones football team =

American college football season

1910 Iowa State Cyclones football
- Conference: Missouri Valley Conference
- Record: 4–4 (2–2 MVC)
- Head coach: Clyde Williams (4th season)
- Captain: Cliff Scott
- Home stadium: State Field

1910 Missouri Valley Conference football standings
| | Conf. | | | | | Overall |
| Team | W | | L | | T | W | | L | | T |
|---|---|---|---|---|---|---|---|---|---|---|
| Nebraska $ | 2 | – | 0 | – | 0 | 7 | – | 1 | – | 0 |
| Iowa | 3 | – | 1 | – | 0 | 5 | – | 2 | – | 0 |
| Missouri | 2 | – | 1 | – | 1 | 4 | – | 2 | – | 2 |
| Iowa State | 2 | – | 2 | – | 0 | 4 | – | 4 | – | 0 |
| Kansas | 1 | – | 1 | – | 1 | 6 | – | 1 | – | 1 |
| Washington University | 0 | – | 2 | – | 0 | 3 | – | 4 | – | 0 |
| Drake | 0 | – | 3 | – | 0 | 3 | – | 5 | – | 0 |
$ – Conference champion

The 1910 Iowa State Cyclones football team represented Iowa State College of Agricultural and Mechanic Arts (later renamed Iowa State University) in the Missouri Valley Conference during the 1910 college football season. In their fourth season under head coach Clyde Williams, the Cyclones compiled a 4–4 record (2–2 against conference opponents), finished in fourth place in the conference, and were outscored by opponents by a combined total of 85 to 37. Cliff Scott was the team captain.

Between 1892 and 1913, the football team played on a field that later became the site of the university's Parks Library. The field was known as State Field; when the new field opened in 1915, it became known as "New State Field".

== Schedule ==
| Date | Opponent | Site | Result | Attendance | Source |
|---|---|---|---|---|---|
| October 1 | Coe* | State Field; Ames, IA | W 12–0 | | |
| October 8 | at Minnesota* | Northrop Field; Minneapolis, MN | L 0–49 | 8,000 | |
| October 15 | Des Moines* | State Field; Ames, IA | W 17–0 | | |
| October 22 | at Missouri | Rollins Field; Columbia, MO (rivalry) | W 6–5 | | |
| October 29 | Morningside* | State Field; Ames, IA | L 0–5 | | |
| November 5 | Iowa | State Field; Ames, IA (rivalry) | L 0–2 | | |
| November 12 | at Nebraska | Nebraska Field; Lincoln, NE (rivalry) | L 0–24 | | |
| November 24 | at Drake | Drake Stadium; Des Moines, IA | W 2–0 | | |
*Non-conference game
