= Horace Whiteside =

American football and basketball coach (1891–1956)

Biographical details
- Born: June 5, 1891; Bell Buckle, Tennessee, U.S.
- Died: June 9, 1956 (aged 65)

Playing career

Football
- 1910–1912: Chicago

Coaching career (HC unless noted)

Football
- 1913: Waterloo HS East (IA)
- 1914–1916: Earlham

Basketball
- 1914–1917: Earlham

Head coaching record
- Overall: 6–17–2 (college football); 14–29 (college basketball)

Horace Eugene Whiteside (June 5, 1891 – June 9, 1956) was an American football player and coach of football and basketball. He served as the head football coach at Earlham College from 1914 to 1916, compiling a record of 6–17–2.

== Head coaching record ==
=== College football ===
Year	Team	Overall	Conference	Standing	Bowl/playoffs
Earlham Quakers (Independent) (1914–1916)
1914	Earlham	3–5			
1915	Earlham	2–6			
1916	Earlham	1–6–2			
Earlham:		6–17–2			
Total:		6–17–2			
