= 1910 Nebraska Cornhuskers football team =

American college football season

1910 Nebraska Cornhuskers football
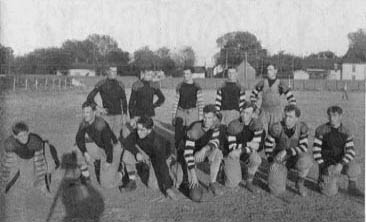

MVC champion
- Conference: Missouri Valley Conference
- Record: 7–1 (2–0 MVC)
- Head coach: William C. "King" Cole (4th season)
- Home stadium: Nebraska Field

1910 Missouri Valley Conference football standings
	Conf.					Overall
Team	W		L		T	W		L		T
Nebraska $	2	–	0	–	0	7	–	1	–	0
Iowa	3	–	1	–	0	5	–	2	–	0
Missouri	2	–	1	–	1	4	–	2	–	2
Iowa State	2	–	2	–	0	4	–	4	–	0
Kansas	1	–	1	–	1	6	–	1	–	1
Washington University	0	–	2	–	0	3	–	4	–	0
Drake	0	–	3	–	0	3	–	5	–	0
$ – Conference champion

The 1910 Nebraska Cornhuskers football team represented the University of Nebraska as a member of the Missouri Valley Conference (MVC) during the 1910 college football season. The team was coached by fourth-year head coach William C. "King" Cole and played its home games at Nebraska Field in Lincoln, Nebraska.

The Cornhuskers won the MVC championship, the school's first since 1907. After the season, the conference adopted a new rule prohibiting "special coaching" and requiring that athletic coaches be full-time faculty members. Unwilling to commit to a year-round position, Cole resigned and moved to his farm in Missoula, Montana. His final game at Nebraska was a record-setting 119–0 win over Haskell.

== Schedule ==
Date	Time	Opponent	Site	Result	Attendance	Source
October 1		Nebraska State Normal*	Nebraska Field; Lincoln, NE	W 66–0		
October 8	3:00 p.m.	South Dakota*	Nebraska Field; Lincoln, NE	W 12–9		
October 15		at Minnesota*	Northrop Field; Minneapolis, MN (rivalry)	L 3–21	15,000	
October 22		Denver*	Nebraska Field; Lincoln, NE	W 27–0		
October 29		Doane*	Nebraska Field; Lincoln, NE	W 6–0		
November 5		at Kansas	Central Park; Lawrence, KS (rivalry)	W 6–0	6,500	
November 12		Iowa State	Nebraska Field; Lincoln, NE (rivalry)	W 24–0		
November 24	2:30 p.m.	Haskell*	Nebraska Field; Lincoln, NE	W 119–0		
*Non-conference game

== Coaching staff ==
Coach	Position	First year	Alma mater
William C. "King" Cole	Head coach	1907	Marietta
Harry W. Ewing	Assistant coach	1910	Nebraska
Jack Best	Trainer	1890	Nebraska

== Roster ==
Anderson, Arthur G
Chauner, Walter E
Elliott, E.B. LG
Frank, Ernest HB
Frank, Owen HB
Gibson, J.P. FB
Harman, Dewey RT
Hornberger, Evans C
Lofgren, Gus E
McKee PLAYER
Minor, Harry HB
Pearson, Monte RG
Potter, Herbert QB
Purdy, Leonard FB
Racely PLAYER
Rathbone, Harvey FB
Russell, Richard HB
Shonka, Sylvester LT
Sturmer, Frederick T
Temple, LeRoy RT
Warner, Leon QB

== Game summaries ==
=== Peru State ===
Peru State at Nebraska

Team	1	2	Total
Peru State			0
• Nebraska			66

- Date: October 1
- Location: Nebraska Field, Lincoln, NE

This was the final meeting between Nebraska and Peru State.

=== South Dakota ===
South Dakota at Nebraska

Team	1	2	Total
South Dakota			9
• Nebraska			12

- Date: October 8
- Location: Nebraska Field, Lincoln, NE
- Game start: 3:00 PM CT

=== At Minnesota ===
Nebraska at Minnesota

Team	1	2	Total
Nebraska			3
• Minnesota			21

- Date: October 15
- Location: Northrop Field, Minneapolis, MN

=== Denver ===
Denver at Nebraska

Team	1	2	Total
Denver			0
• Nebraska			27

- Date: October 22
- Location: Nebraska Field, Lincoln, NE

This was the final meeting between Denver and Nebraska.

=== Doane ===
Doane at Nebraska

Team	1	2	Total
Doane			0
• Nebraska			6

- Date: October 29
- Location: Nebraska Field, Lincoln, NE

=== At Kansas ===
Nebraska at Kansas

Team	1	2	Total
• Nebraska			6
Kansas			0

- Date: November 5
- Location: Central Park, Lawrence, KS

Nebraska clinched at least a share of the MVIAA championship with a 6–0 win over Kansas.

=== Iowa State ===
Iowa State at Nebraska

Team	1	2	Total
Iowa State			0
• Nebraska			24

- Date: November 12
- Location: Nebraska Field, Lincoln, NE

Nebraska clinched the conference title outright with a 24–0 win over Iowa State, NU's fourth consecutive shutout.

=== Haskell ===
Haskell at Nebraska

Team	1	2	Total
Haskell			0
• Nebraska			119

- Date: November 24
- Location: Nebraska Field, Lincoln, NE
- Game start: 2:30 PM CT

In Cole's final game as head coach, Nebraska set several program records in a 119–0 blowout of Haskell. Among the marks that still stand are points scored, margin of victory, and yards of offense (1,150). The Indians managed only 67 yards in their 17 total plays in the game.
