= 1911 Indiana Hoosiers football team =

American college football season

1911 Indiana Hoosiers football
- Conference: Western Conference
- Record: 3–3–1 (0–3–1 Western)
- Head coach: James M. Sheldon (7th season)
- Captain: Thomas Andrew Gill
- Home stadium: Jordan Field

1911 Western Conference football standings
	Conf.					Overall
Team	W		L		T	W		L		T
Minnesota $	3	–	0	–	1	6	–	0	–	1
Chicago	5	–	1	–	0	6	–	1	–	0
Wisconsin	2	–	1	–	1	5	–	1	–	1
Illinois	2	–	2	–	1	4	–	2	–	1
Iowa	2	–	2	–	0	3	–	4	–	0
Purdue	1	–	3	–	0	3	–	4	–	0
Northwestern	1	–	4	–	0	3	–	4	–	0
Indiana	0	–	3	–	1	3	–	3	–	1
$ – Conference champion

The 1911 Indiana Hoosiers football team was an American football team that represented Indiana University Bloomington during the 1911 college football season. In their seventh season under head coach James M. Sheldon, the Hoosiers compiled a 3–3–1 record. Although they finished in last place in the Western Conference, they outscored all opponents by a combined total of 74 to 46.

== Schedule ==
Date	Opponent	Site	Result	Attendance	Source
September 30	DePauw*	Jordan Field; Bloomington, IN	W 9–6		
October 7	at Chicago	Marshall Field; Chicago, IL	L 6–23		
October 14	Franklin (IN)*	Jordan Field; Bloomington, IN	W 42–0		
October 21	at Northwestern	Northwestern Field; Evanston, IL	L 0–5		
October 28	Washington University*	Jordan Field; Bloomington, IN	W 12–0	3,000	
November 11	vs. Illinois	Indianapolis, IN (rivalry)	T 0–0		
November 25	Purdue	Jordan Field; Bloomington, IN (rivalry)	L 5–12		
*Non-conference game
