= Charles M. Rademacher =

American football player and college sports coach

Playing career

Football
- 1909–1911: Chicago
- Positions: Tackle, guard

Coaching career (HC unless noted)

Football
- 1912–1914: New Mexico Military
- 1915: Idaho
- 1917: Saint Louis
- 1919–1920: Saint Louis
- 1925: New Mexico Military

Basketball
- 1915–1916: Idaho

Baseball
- 1916: Idaho

Administrative career (AD unless noted)
- 1912–1915: New Mexico Military
- c. 1921: Saint Louis
- 1925–1926: New Mexico Military

Head coaching record
- Overall: 12–15–4 (football)

Accomplishments and honors

Awards
- All-American (1911); All-Western (1911)

Charles Martin Rademacher was an American football player and college sports coach. He served as the head football coach (1915), basketball coach (1915–1916) and baseball coach (1916) at the University of Idaho. Rademacher later served as the head football coach and athletic director at Saint Louis University.

Rademacher played college football at the University of Chicago under head coach Amos Alonzo Stagg, serving as team captain in 1911.

In 1912, Rademacher was appointed athletic director and coach at the New Mexico Military Institute in Roswell, New Mexico. He returned to the same post at New Mexico Military in 1925.

== Head coaching record ==
=== Football ===
| Year | Team | Overall | Conference | Standing | Bowl/playoffs |
|---|---|---|---|---|---|
Idaho (Northwest Conference) (1915)
| 1915 | Idaho | 1–4–1 | 0–3–1 | 5th | |
| Idaho: | | 1–4–1 | 0–3–1 | | |
Saint Louis Billikens (Independent) (1917)
| 1917 | Saint Louis | 4–3–1 | | | |
Saint Louis Billikens (Independent) (1919–1920)
| 1919 | Saint Louis | 4–2–2 | | | |
| 1920 | Saint Louis | 3–6 | | | |
| Saint Louis: | | 11–11–3 | | | |
| Total: | | 12–15–4 | | | |
