= Paul Belting =

American athletic director (1887–1943)

Paul E. Belting (1887 – July 20, 1943) was an athletic director for the University of Iowa from 1924 to 1929. He was the third athletic director in school history, and he oversaw the construction of the Iowa Field House in 1927 and Iowa Stadium in 1929.

== Background ==
Paul Belting graduated from Eastern Illinois State Normal High School in Illiopolis, Illinois. He played football for Eastern Illinois State Teachers College in 1907 and 1908. He then attended the University of Illinois, where he played football, lettering in the sport in 1911. He later served as a high school principal in Oskaloosa, Iowa, Globe, Arizona, and Martinsville, Illinois. Belting coached Oskaloosa High School to the football state championship in 1916. He then was a high school athletic director in New York City from 1917 to 1920. Belting joined the College of Education at the University of Illinois in 1920. He wrote "The Development of the Free Public High School in Illinois to 1860" (ISBN 1-14020-704-0) in 1919.

== Athletic director ==
In 1924, Iowa's head football coach and athletic director, Howard Jones, left Iowa to take the head coaching position at Duke University. The University of Iowa hired Paul Belting to succeed Jones as Iowa's athletic director on March 13, 1924. Belting now needed to hire a football coach, and after a failed attempt to hire Notre Dame head coach Knute Rockne, Belting hired fellow Illinois alumnus Burt Ingwersen. Many Iowa alumni were displeased with Belting hiring a fellow Illini to the post.

Paul Belting consolidated athletics with the Physical Education program at Iowa and planned several new athletic buildings. Within five years, Belting oversaw the constructions of the Iowa Field House and Iowa Stadium. Belting got funding and architectural plans approved in a surprisingly short time. "If it hadn’t been for him, Iowa's new stadium probably wouldn’t have been built for another 20 years", former Iowa sports information director George Wine wrote.

Belting abruptly resigned at the end of his five-year contract on April 26, 1929. Two weeks later, Iowa was suspended from Big Ten athletic competition by the conference for allegedly maintaining a "slush fund" for prospective athletes. This fund was nicknamed the "Belting fund" in the press, while Belting accused the university of not having proper faculty control of athletics. Iowa fans held Belting responsible for their suspension from Big Ten athletic competition and threw eggs at his home.

== Retirement ==
Belting moved back to Illinois and took a job as an assistant state superintendent of public instruction. He wrote "The Modern High School Curriculum" (ISBN 1-40673-815-8) in 1942.
