= Stuart Field =

Stadium at Purdue University in Indiana, US

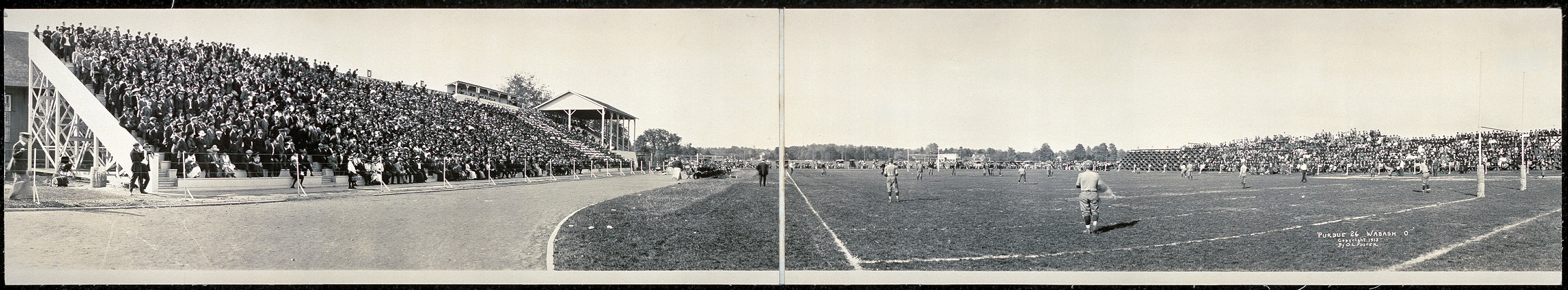
- Football game in 1913. (Click to enlarge.)
- Location: West Lafayette, Indiana, U.S.
- Owner: Purdue University
- Operator: Purdue University

Construction
- Opened: April 16, 1892
- Closed: 1940

Tenants
- Purdue Boilermakers football (1892–1924); Purdue Boilermakers baseball (1892–1939)

Stuart Field was a stadium at Purdue University in West Lafayette, Indiana, United States. It was the home field of the Purdue Boilermakers football team from 1892 until 1924 when Ross–Ade Stadium opened. Purdue's baseball team continued to play at Stuart Field until 1939. The Elliott Hall of Music is located at Stuart Field's former site, while the west grand stand of the field was adjacent to the Purdue Armory.

The field was dedicated on April 16, 1892, and named for Charles B. and William V. Stuart, two brothers who served on the university's board of trustees. Originally a seven-acre (2.8 ha) field with 800 seats, by the 1910s it was expanded to twice that area and a seating capacity of 5,000. Stuart Field was also used for special events, including a biplane demonstration on June 13, 1911, which attracted 17,000 spectators.
