= 1910 All-Eastern football team =

American all-star college football team

The 1910 All-Eastern football team consists of American football players chosen by various selectors as the best players at each position among the Eastern colleges and universities during the 1910 college football season.

== All-Eastern selections ==
=== Quarterbacks ===
- Earl Sprackling, Brown (NYH-1; NYT-1; TC-1; HF-1)
- Art Howe, Yale (NYT-2; TC-2; HF-2)
- E. W. Butler, Cornell (NYH-2)

=== Halfbacks ===
- Percy Wendell, Harvard (NYH-1; NYT-1; TC-1; HF-1)
- James Russell McKay, Brown (NYT-1; TC-1; HF-1)
- Hamilton Corbett, Harvard (NYH-2; TC-2; HF-1)
- John Field, Yale (TC-2; HF-2)
- John Dalton, Navy (NYH-2)

=== Fullbacks ===
- Leroy Mercer, Penn (NYH-1; NYT-1; TC-1; HF-2)
- Talbot Pendleton, Princeton (NYH-1; NYT-2; TC-2; HF-2)
- Erle Oatman Kistler, Yale (NYH-2)
- Fred Ramsdell, Penn (NYT-2)

=== Ends ===
- John Kilpatrick, Yale (NYH-1; NYT-1; TC-1; HF-1)
- L.D. Smith, Harvard (NYH-1; NYT-1; TC-1; HF-1)
- Edward Daley, Dartmouth (TC-2; HF-2)
- Busty Ashbaugh, Brown (TC-2; HF-2)
- William Marks, Penn (NYH-2)
- K. P. Gilchrist, Navy (NYH-2; NYT-2)
- Harold Eyrich, Cornell (NYT-2)

=== Tackles ===
- Robert McKay, Harvard (NYH-2; NYT-1; TC-1; HF-1)
- Paul, Yale (NYT-1; TC-1; HF-1)
- Paul Withington, Harvard (NYH-1; NYT-2; HF-2)
- Jim Scully, Yale (NYH-1; TC-2)
- Ralph W. Sherwin, Dartmouth (NYH-2; NYT-2; TC-2; HF-2)

=== Guards ===
- Bob Fisher, Harvard (NYH-1; NYT-1; TC-1; HF-1)
- Weir, Army (NYH-2; NYT-2; TC-1; HF-1)
- John H. Brown Jr., Navy (NYH-1; NYT-1; TC-2)
- Wright, Navy (TC-2; HF-2)
- Archibald Vincent Arnold, Army (NYH-2; HF-2)
- Thomas A. Wilson, Princeton (NYH-2; NYT-2)

=== Centers ===
- Ernest Cozens, Penn (NYH-1; NYT-1; TC-2; HF-1)
- Effingham Morris, Yale (NYT-2; TC-1; HF-2)

== Key ==
- NYH = New York Herald
- NYT = New York Tribune
- NYS = The New York Sun
- TC = Ted Coy, head coach of Yale
- HF = Hamilton Fish III

== See also ==
- 1910 College Football All-America Team
