= 1908 All-Western college football team =

American all-star college football team

The 1908 All-Western college football team consists of American football players selected to the All-Western teams chosen by various selectors for the 1908 college football season.

== All-Western selections ==
=== Ends ===
- James Dean, Wisconsin (ALF, CDN, WE)
- Walter Henry Rademacher, Minnesota (CDN, CRH)
- Harlan Page, Chicago (ALF, WE)
- Anderson, Wisconsin (CRH)

=== Tackles ===
- James Walker, Minnesota (ALF, CDN, CRH, WE)
- Oscar Osthoff, Wisconsin (ALF, CDN)
- Ralph Dimmick, Notre Dame (WE)

=== Guards ===
- Albert Benbrook, Michigan (CDN, CRH, WE) (CFHOF)
- Glenn D. Butzer, Illinois (ALF, CDN, CRH)
- Sam Dolan, Notre Dame (WE)
- William Mackmiller, Wisconsin (ALF)

=== Centers ===
- Henry E. Farnum, Minnesota (CDN, CRH)
- Andrew W. Smith, Michigan (WE)
- Benjamin Harrison Badenoch, Chicago (ALF)

=== Quarterbacks ===
- John McGovern, Minnesota (ALF, CRH, WE) (CFHOF)
- Harlan Page, Chicago (CDN)

=== Halfbacks ===
- Dave Allerdice, Michigan (CDN, WE)
- Joe Magidsohn, Michigan (CRH, WE)
- William Lucas Crawley, Chicago (ALF, CRH)
- Reuben Martin Rosenwald, Minnesota (ALF, CDN)

=== Fullbacks ===
- Earle T. Pickering, Minnesota (ALF, CRH)
- Oscar William Worthwine, Chicago (CDN)
- Robert E. Vaughan, Notre Dame (WE)

== Key ==
Bold = consensus choice by a majority of the selectors

ALF = A. L. Fridstein in Daily Maroon (Univ. of Chicago)

CDN = Chicago Daily News

CRH = Chicago Record-Herald

WE = Walter Eckersall in the Chicago Tribune

CFHOF = College Football Hall of Fame

== See also ==
- 1908 College Football All-America Team
