= List of Michigan Wolverines football All-Americans =

Michigan Wolverines football All-Americans are collegiate football players who have been named as All-Americans while playing for the University of Michigan football team.

== Overview ==
Since 1898, 145 Michigan Wolverines football players have earned first-team All-American honors recognized by the NCAA (Note: The five official selectors the NCAA recognizes and deems for unanimous and consensus All-Americans are the Walter Camp Football Foundation (WCFF), American Football Coaches Association (AFCA), Associated Press (AP), Football Writers Association of America (FWAA) and The Sporting News (TSN).) (including 76 consensus All-Americans on 89 separate selections).

There are two players who have earned the distinction three times: Bennie Oosterbaan (1925–1927) and Anthony Carter (1980–1982).

There are twenty-four others who have earned the distinction twice: Willie Heston, Albert Benbrook, Benny Friedman, Chuck Bernard, Ted Petoskey, Tom Harmon, Alvin Wistert, Robert Wahl, Ron Kramer, Bill Yearby, Dave Brown, Mark Donahue, Jumbo Elliott, Mark Messner, Tripp Welborne, Greg Skrepenak, Charles Woodson, Steve Hutchinson, Marlin Jackson, Jake Long, Taylor Lewan, Jake Butt, Jourdan Lewis, and Blake Corum.

Twenty-seven Michigan players have been unanimous All-American selections: Bennie Oosterbaan, Harry Newman, Chuck Bernard, Ralph Heikkinen, Tom Harmon, Bill Daley, Bob Chappuis, Ron Kramer, Jack Clancy, Jim Mandich, Mike Taylor, Dave Brown, Mark Donahue, Anthony Carter, Mark Messner, Tripp Welborne, Desmond Howard, Greg Skrepenak, Charles Woodson, Steve Hutchinson, Braylon Edwards, Jake Long, Jabrill Peppers, Aidan Hutchinson, Blake Corum, Zak Zinter, and Mason Graham.

Two players have been selected as unanimous All-Americans twice: Anthony Carter and Tripp Welborne (two of eleven players in Big Ten Conference history).

William Cunningham was the first All-American in 1898, based on a performance that led Louis Elbel to write "The Victors". Neil Snow was the second in 1901, based on his role on the 1901 team that outscored its opponents 550–0. Willie Heston was the first Michigan All-American selected by Walter Camp in 1903. Since then the Wolverines have had 85 players selected by the Walter Camp Football Foundation; the most storied of any collegiate program.

== Sortable chart of Michigan's All-Americans ==
Player	Position	Year	Unanimous	Consensus	Selectors
William Cunningham	C	1898	No	Yes	CW-1
Allen Steckle	T	1898	No	No	WC-2
John McLean	HB	1899	No	No	PI
Richard France	G	1899	No	No	PI
Neil Snow	E	1899	No	No	PI
Neil Snow	E	1901	No	Yes	
Joe Maddock	T	1902	No	No	NA
Boss Weeks	QB	1902	No	No	NA
Willie Heston	HB	1902	No	No	NA; CW-2
Willie Heston	HB	1903	No	Yes	WC-1; CW-1; FY-1; SA-1
Herb Graver	HB	1903	No	No	WC-3
Joe Maddock	T	1903	No	No	WC-3; CW-2; FY-1; SA-1
Curtis Redden	E	1903	No	No	WC-3
Willie Heston	HB	1904	No	Yes	WC-1, NYET, FL
Joe Curtis	T	1904	No	No	WC-2, FL
Joe Curtis	T	1905	No	No	WC-2
Thomas Hammond	HB	1905	No	No	WC-3
Henry Schulte	G	1905	No	No	WC-2
John Garrels	FB	1906	No	No	WC-3
Germany Schulz	C	1907	No	Yes	WC-1; CW-2; FY-1
Walter Rheinschild	T	1907	No	No	FY-1
Germany Schulz	C	1908	No	No	CON-2 [9]; NYW; PI; FY; TT; CSM; NYET; BSU; BP; PD; NHR; TJ; KCJ; PP; PT; PES
William Casey	T	1909	No	No	
Albert Benbrook	G	1909	No	Yes	WC-1
Dave Allerdice	HB	1909	No	No	WC-2; NYT-1; TC-1
Joe Magidsohn	HB	1909	No	No	WC-2
Albert Benbrook	G	1910	No	Yes	WC–1; TC-1; OUT; ES; LES; TEL
Stanfield Wells	E	1910	No	Yes	WC-1; OUT
Joe Magidsohn	HB	1910	No	No	LES-2; TC-1; CP; OUT; TEL; PP-2; WT; PD; NYG; NYMT; PT; ALS; PL; Penn
Stanfield Wells	E	1911	No	No	WC-3 [hb]; NYG-1; HW-1; HL
Miller Pontius	T	1912	No	No	ASH-1
Miller Pontius	T	1913	No	Yes	NS-1; MFP-2; FY-1; PHD-1; TT-1
James Craig	HB	1913	No	Yes	WC–1; HW-1; INS-1; MFP-1; FY-1; TT-1; TET-1
Bubbles Paterson	C	1913	No	No	WC–3; MFP-1
Tommy Hughitt	QB	1913	No	No	MFP-2; FY-1
John Maulbetsch	HB	1914	No	Yes	WC–1; VF [fb]; PHD; WE–1; FM-1; MO-1; PGT [fb]; BN; AC; PS; DD; PET; SLT; MD; NES; DN; PPL; BP; AW; PI; OUT
John Maulbetsch	HB	1915	No	No	WE-2; MON-2; TC-1
Cliff Sparks	QB	1916	No	No	MON-1
John Maulbetsch	HB	1916	No	No	FY-1
Cedrick "Pat" Smith	FB	1917	No	No	
Ernest Allmendinger	G	1917	No	No	
Frank Culver	G	1917	No	No	WC–1; NEA; JV-2; PP-1
Oscar Lambert	C	1917	No	No	WE-2
Archie Weston	QB	1917	No	No	WE-1
Frank Steketee	FB	1918	No	No	WC-1; BM-2
Angus Goetz	T	1918	No	No	WC-3
Angus Goetz	T	1920	No	No	WC-2
Tad Wieman	T	1920	No	No	LP-2
Ernie Vick	C	1921	No	No	FW-3; WC-1; WE-3; MM-2
Paul Goebel	E	1921	No	No	LP-1
Robert J. Dunne	G	1921	No	No	NB-1
Franklin Cappon	T	1921	No	No	NB-2
Paul Goebel	E	1922	No	No	NYT-1; NB-1; AW-1; LP-1; BE; RO-1
Bernard Kirk	E	1922	No	No	WC-2; NYT-1; WE-1; NB-2; LP-2; BE; FH-1; RO-2
Irwin Uteritz	QB	1922	No	No	WC-3; WE-3; FM-1; RO-5
Harry Kipke	HB	1922	No	Yes	WC-1; NYT-2; AW-1; WE-1; NB-1; LP-1 [qb]; BE; RO-2
Stanley Muirhead	T	1922	No	No	LP-2; RO-4
Franklin Cappon	FB	1922	No	No	WE-3; NYT-2 [hb]; FH-2; RO-5 [hb]
Edliff Slaughter	G	1923	No	No	LP-1
Jack Blott	C	1923	No	Yes	AW-1; WC-1; NB-1; DW-1
Harry Kipke	HB	1923	No	No	AW-2; LP-1; TT-3
Stanley Muirhead	T	1923	No	No	AW-2; LP-2; NB-2
Edliff Slaughter	G	1924	No	No	WC-1; LP-1; BE-2; NB-1
Harry Hawkins	G	1925	No	No	JRW-3; WE-3
Robert J. Brown	C	1925	No	No	AP-2; COL-2; A&S-1; Sun–2; BE-1; NB-1
Tom Edwards	T	1925	No	No	AP-2; COL-2; A&S-1; Sun–2; BE-1; NB-1
Benny Friedman	QB	1925	No	Yes	UP-1; AP-2; COL-2; JRW-1; Sun–1; WE–2; BE-2
Bennie Oosterbaan	E	1925	No	Yes	UP-1; AP-1; COL-1; A&S-1; JRW-1; Sun-1; WC; WE–1; BE-1; NB-1
Benny Friedman	QB	1926	No	Yes	AP-1; COL-1; CP-1; NYS-1; BE-1; RWJ-2; RG-1; DW-1; ES-1
Bennie Oosterbaan	E	1926	No	Yes	AP-3; COL-1; CP-1; WC-1; BE-1; RWJ-1; RG-2; ES-1
Bennie Oosterbaan	E	1927	Yes	Yes	AP-1; UP-1; COL-1; CP-1; HE-1; DJW-1; NYS-1; BE-1; LP-1
Otto Pommerening	T	1928	No	Yes	AP-1; UP-1; CO-1
Harry Newman	QB	1930	No	No	INS-3
Maynard Morrison	C	1931	No	No	AP–3; COL–1; NEA-1; CP–3
Bill Hewitt	E	1931	No	No	NEA-3
Harry Newman	QB	1932	Yes	Yes	AP-1; UP-1; CO-1; AAB-1; NEA-1; INS-1; CP-1; NYS-1; NYT-1; WC-1; TR-1
Chuck Bernard	C	1932	No	No	AP-3; NEA-1; INS-1
Ted Petoskey	E	1932	No	No	WC-1; AAB-1; INS-3; NYS-2
Chuck Bernard	C	1933	Yes	Yes	AP-1; UP-1; CO-1; NEA-1; INS-1; CP-1; NYS-1; WC-1; DJW-1; WD-1
Ted Petoskey	E	1933	No	No	AP-2; UP-2; CO-2; INS-1; CP-1
Francis Wistert	T	1933	No	Yes	UP-1; CO-1; INS-2; CP-2; NYS-1; WC-1; DJW-1; WD-1
Herman Everhardus	HB	1933	No	No	COL-3; NEA-2; INS-2
Matt Patanelli	E	1936	No	No	AP-3; CP-2
Ralph Heikkinen	G	1938	Yes	Yes	AP-1; UP-1; CP-1; CO-1; NEA-1; NYS-1; WC-1
Tom Harmon	HB	1939	No	Yes	AP-1; UP-1; CO-1; CP-1; INS-1; NEA-3; NYS-1 [fb]; WC-1; NW-1 (2nd in Heisman Trophy voting)
Tom Harmon	HB	1940	Yes	Yes	AP-1; UP-1; HE-1; CP-1; CO-1; NEA-1; NYS-1; WC-1 (Heisman Trophy winner)
Ed Frutig	E	1940	No	No	AP-3; UP-3; HE-1; CP-3
Bob Westfall	FB	1941	No	Yes	AP-1; UP-1; AAB-1; CO-1; NEA-1; INS-1; CP-1; NYS-1; WC-1
Julius Franks	G	1942	No	Yes	AP-2; SN-3; INS-1; CP-1; NEA-2; CO-1; NYS-2
Al Wistert	T	1942	No	Yes	AP-2; UP-1; SN-2; CP-3; NEA-3; LK-1; NYS-1; WC-1; MS-1
Julius Franks	G	1942	Yes	Yes	AP-2; CO-1; INS-1; NEA-2; NW; SN-3; CP-1; NYS-2
Merv Pregulman	T	1942	No	No	SN-3; NEA-1; MS-1 [4-way tie]
Merv Pregulman	T	1943	No	No	CO-1; SS-1 [tackle]
Bill Daley	FB	1943	Yes	Yes	AP-1; UP-; CO-1; SS-1; INS-1; CP-1; NYS-1
Milan Lazetich	T	1944	No	No	AP-2; UP-3; FWAA-2; INS-2; CP-2
Elmer Madar	E	1946	No	No	AP-1; INS-2; CP-3
Bob Chappuis	HB	1947	Yes	Yes	AP-1; UP-1; PO-1; CO-1; NEA-1; CP-1; INS-1; WC-1; FW-1 (2nd in Heisman Trophy voting)
J.T. White	C	1947	No	No	FWAA-2
Bump Elliott	HB	1947	No	No	AP-2; UP-2; PO-1; NEA-3; CP-2; INS-3; FW-2
Pete Elliott	QB	1948	No	No	INS-1 [defense]
Dick Rifenburg	E	1948	No	Yes	AP-1; UP-1; NEA-1; CP-1; INS-1 [offense]; WC-1; FW-1
Alvin Wistert	T	1948	No	Yes	UP-1; CO-1; NEA-2; CP-1; WC-1; FW-2
Dick Kempthorn	FB	1949	No	No	AP-2; UP-2; FWAA-3
Chuck Ortmann	HB	1949	No	No	FWAA-2
Robert Wahl	T	1949	No	No	NEA-1 (offense); FWAA-1
Alvin Wistert	T	1949	No	Yes	WC-1; AP-3; UP-1; TSN; INS-1 (defense)
Robert Wahl	T	1950	No	No	AAB; AP (defense)-1; UP-2; INS (offense)-1; CP-2
Chuck Ortmann	HB	1950	No	No	CP-3
Tom Johnson	T	1951	No	No	CT
Lowell Perry	E	1951	No	No	UP-3; CP-2
Lowell Perry	E	1952	No	No	NEA
Art Walker	T	1954	No	No	AAB, FWAA
Ron Kramer	E	1954	No	No	AP-3; UP-3; CP-1; INS-2
Ron Kramer	E	1955	No	Yes	AAB, AFCA, FWAA, INS, NEA, SN, UP, WC
Tom Maentz	E	1955	No	No	AP-2; UP-2; CP-3
Ron Kramer	E	1956	Yes	Yes	AP, UP, CP, NEA, INS, TSN, AFCA, WC, FWAA (6th in Heisman Trophy voting)
Jim Pace	HB	1957	No	No	AAB, AP-1, INS-2, UP-2
Jim Van Pelt	QB	1957	No	No	INS-2
Bennie McRae	HB	1961	No	No	AP-3
Bob Timberlake	QB	1964	No	No	AP-1, FWAA, FN [RB], NEA-2 [RB]) (4th in Heisman Trophy voting)
Bill Yearby	DT	1964	No	No	AFCA-3, AP-2, CP-1, FN, NEA-1
Tom Mack	OT	1965	No	No	UPI-2, NEA-2
Bill Yearby	DT	1965	No	Yes	AFCA, AP-2, CP-1, UPI-1, Time, TSN, WC
Jack Clancy	E	1966	Yes	Yes	AFCA, AP-1, CP-1, FWAA, NEA-1, UPI-1, Time, TSN, WC
Rick Volk	DB	1966	No	No	Time, TSN
Joe Dayton	C	1967	No	No	CP-3
Ron Johnson	HB	1967	No	No	CP-2
Ray Phillips	OG	1967	No	No	CP-3, UPI-2
Tom Curtis	DB	1968	No	No	AP-2, UPI-2
Ron Johnson	HB	1968	No	No	FWAA, FN, AP-2, CP-2, NEA-2, UPI-2
Tom Curtis	DB	1969	No	Yes	AP, UPI, WC, CP, FN
Jim Mandich	TE	1969	Yes	Yes	AP, UPI, NEA, WC, AFCA, FWAA, CP, Time, FN
Marty Huff	LB	1970	No	No	AFCA
Dan Dierdorf	OT	1970	No	Yes	AP, UPI, NEA, FWAA, WC, AFCA, Time, PFW, FN
Henry Hill	G	1970	No	No	CP
Reggie McKenzie	OG	1971	No	Yes	AP, UPI, NEA, WC, FWAA, TSN, Time, FN
Thom Darden	DB	1971	No	No	AFCA, TSN
Billy Taylor	RB	1971	No	No	FN
Mike Taylor	LB	1971	Yes	Yes	AP, UPI, NEA, WC, AFCA, FWAA, TSN, Time, FN
Paul Seymour	OT	1972	No	Yes	NEA, FWAA, AFCA, TSN, Time
Randy Logan	DB	1972	No	Yes	UPI, WC, AFCA, FN
Dave Gallagher	DT	1973	No	Yes	AP, NEA, WC, AFCA, FWAA, TSN, Time
Dave Brown	DB	1973	No	Yes	UPI, AFCA, FWAA
Mike Lantry	PK	1973	No	No	FN
Dave Brown	DB	1974	Yes	Yes	AP, UPI, NEA, WC, AFCA, FWAA, TSN, FN, Time
Don Dufek	DB	1975	No	No	WC, FWAA, FN
Rob Lytle	RB	1976	No	Yes	AP, UPI, WC, AFCA, FN, CFN (3rd in Heisman Trophy voting)
Calvin O'Neal	LB	1976	No	No	UPI, WC, TSN, CFN
Jim Smith	WR	1976	No	No	AP, TSN, FN, FWAA
Mark Donahue	OG	1976	No	Yes	UPI, NEA, WC, FWAA, FN
Mark Donahue	OG	1977	Yes	Yes	AP, UPI, NEA, WC, AFCA, FWAA, TSN, FN
John Anderson	LB	1977	No	No	FWAA
Walt Downing	C	1977	No	No	AFCA, TSN, FN
Rick Leach	QB	1978	No	No	AFCA-t (3rd in Heisman Trophy voting)
Ron Simpkins	LB	1979	No	Yes	AP, UPI, WC, FWAA
Curtis Greer	DT	1979	No	No	NEA, AFCA, FWAA
George Lilja	C	1980	No	No	WC
Anthony Carter	WR	1980	No	No	AP, TSN
Anthony Carter	WR	1981	Yes	Yes	AP, UPI, NEA, WC, AFCA, FWAA, TSN
Ed Muransky	OT	1981	No	Yes	AP, UPI
Bubba Paris	OT	1981	No	No	WC
Kurt Becker	OG	1981	No	Yes	AP, NEA, AFCA
Butch Woolfolk	RB	1981	No	No	FN
Anthony Carter	WR	1982	Yes	Yes	AP, UPI, NEA, WC, AFCA, FWAA, TSN (4th in Heisman Trophy voting)
Tom Dixon	C	1983	No	No	AP, AFCA, TSN
Stefan Humphries	OG	1983	No	No	UPI, FWAA, TSN
Brad Cochran	DB	1985	No	Yes	UPI, WC, AFCA, FWAA
Mike Hammerstein	DT	1985	No	Yes	AP, UPI, AFCA
Jim Harbaugh	QB	1986	No	No	UPI-2 (3rd in Heisman Trophy voting)
Garland Rivers	DB	1986	No	Yes	NEA, WC, AFCA
Jumbo Elliott	OT	1986	No	No	AFCA
Jumbo Elliott	OT	1987	No	Yes	UPI, WC, AFCA, FWAA
Mark Messner	DT	1987	No	No	TSN
Mark Messner	DT	1988	Yes	Yes	AP, UPI, WC, AFCA, FWAA, TSN
John Vitale	C	1988	No	Yes	UPI, WC
Tripp Welborne	DB	1989	Yes	Yes	AP, UPI, WC, AFCA, FWAA, TSN, FN
Tripp Welborne	DB	1990	Yes	Yes	AP, UPI, NEA, WC, AFCA, FWAA, SH, TSN, FN
Dean Dingman	OG	1990	No	No	AFCA, TSN
Greg Skrepenak	OT	1990	No	No	WC
Greg Skrepenak	OT	1991	No	Yes	AP, UPI, NEA, WC, AFCA, FWAA, SH, TSN, FN
Erick Anderson	LB	1991	No	No	UPI
Desmond Howard	WR	1991	Yes	Yes	AP, UPI, NEA, WC, AFCA, SH, TSN, FN (Heisman Trophy winner)
Chris Hutchinson	DT	1992	No	No	AFCA, FWAA, SH, FN
Tyrone Wheatley	RB	1993	No	No	SH
Remy Hamilton	PK	1994	No	No	WC
Ty Law	DB	1994	No	No	WC
Jason Horn	DT	1995	No	No	AFCA
Jarrett Irons	LB	1996	No	Yes	AP, AFCA, WC
Rod Payne	C	1996	No	No	AFCA
Charles Woodson	DB	1996	No	No	AP, FWAA
Charles Woodson	DB	1997	Yes	Yes	AP, AFCA, FWAA, WC, TSN, FN (Heisman Trophy winner)
Jerame Tuman	TE	1997	No	No	FN
Glen Steele	DT	1997	No	No	AFCA
Jon Jansen	OT	1998	No	No	AFCA
Rob Renes	DT	1999	No	No	TSN
Steve Hutchinson	OG	1999	No	No	PFW, CNNSI
Steve Hutchinson	OG	2000	Yes	Yes	AP, WC, AFCA, FWAA, PFW, FN, CNNSI, Rivals
David Terrell	WR	2000	No	No	PFW, CNNSI, Rivals
Larry Foote	LB	2001	No	No	FN
Marquise Walker	WR	2001	No	No	AFCA
Bennie Joppru	TE	2002	No	No	PFW
Marlin Jackson	DB	2002	No	No	PFW
Chris Perry	RB	2003	No	Yes	AP, AFCA, WC, TSN, PFW, SI, ESPN, Rivals (4th in Heisman Trophy voting)
Marlin Jackson	DB	2004	No	Yes	AP, AFCA, FWAA, TSN, ESPN
Braylon Edwards	WR	2004	Yes	Yes	AP, AFCA, FWAA, TSN, SI, PFW, ESPN, CBS, CFN, Rivals.com
David Baas	C	2004	No	Yes	AP, FWAA, WC, CBS
Ernest Shazor	DB	2004	No	Yes	AP, FWAA, WC, SI, ESPN, CBS, CFN, Rivals.com
Mike Hart	RB	2006	No	No	CFN, Rivals.com
Alan Branch	DT	2006	No	No	SI, PFW, ESPN, Scout.com
LaMarr Woodley	LB	2006	Yes	Yes	AP, AFCA, FWAA, WC, TSN, ESPN, CBS, Rivals.com, Scout.com
Leon Hall	DB	2006	No	Yes	AP, FWAA, AFCA, WC, PFW, CBS, CFN, Rivals.com, Scout.com
Jake Long	OT	2006	No	Yes	AP, AFCA, FWAA, WC, SI, PFW, ESPN, CBS, Rivals.com, Scout.com
Jake Long	OT	2007	Yes	Yes	AP, AFCA, FWAA, WC, TSN, SI, PFW, ESPN, CBS, CFN, Rivals.com, Scout.com
Brandon Graham	DE	2009	No	No	ESPN, Rivals.com, Scout.com
Denard Robinson	QB	2010	No	No	FWAA (6th in Heisman Trophy voting)
David Molk	C	2011	No	Yes	AP, AFCA, FWAA, SI
Taylor Lewan	OT	2012	No	No	WC, ESPN, AP, SI
Taylor Lewan	OT	2013	No	No	TSN
Jake Butt	TE	2015	No	No	CBS, SI
Jourdan Lewis	CB	2015	No	No	SI, USAT
Jourdan Lewis	CB	2016	No	Yes	AFCA, AP, WCFF, TSN, SI, ESPN, CBS
Jake Butt	TE	2016	No	Yes	AFCA, WCFF
Jabrill Peppers	LB	2016	Yes	Yes	AFCA, FWAA, AP, WCFF, TSN, SI, USAT, ESPN, FOX, CBS (5th in Heisman Trophy voting)
Chris Wormley	DE	2016	No	No	TSN-2
Maurice Hurst	DT	2017	No	Yes	AP, TSN, USAT, ESPN, CBS
Devin Bush	LB	2018	No	Yes	AFCA, FWAA, TSN, WCFF, SI, USAT, CFN, CBS
Chase Winovich	DE	2018	No	No	WCFF-2, AFCA-2, CFN-2
Ben Bredeson	G	2019	No	No	WCFF-2
Aidan Hutchinson	DE	2021	Yes	Yes	AP, AFCA, FWAA, TSN, WCFF, ESPN, CBS, Athletic, USAT (2nd in Heisman Trophy voting)
Jake Moody	K	2021	No	Yes	AP, AFCA, WCFF, CBS
Hassan Haskins	RB	2021	No	No	AFCA-2
Andrew Stueber	G	2021	No	No	AFCA-2
David Ojabo	DE	2021	No	No	AP-2, CBS-2
Blake Corum	RB	2022	Yes	Yes	AP, AFCA, FWAA, TSN, WCFF, ESPN, CBS, Athletic, USAT (7th in Heisman Trophy voting)
Olusegun Oluwatimi	C	2022	No	Yes	AFCA, FWAA, TSN, WCFF, ESPN, Athletic, USAT
Mike Morris	DE	2022	No	No	FWAA-2, AFCA-2
Zak Zinter	G	2023	Yes	Yes	AP, AFCA, FWAA, TSN, WCFF, ESPN, Athletic, USAT, SI, FOX
Blake Corum	RB	2023	No	No	AFCA (9th in Heisman Trophy voting)
Mike Sainristil	CB	2023	No	No	TSN, ESPN, FOX
Will Johnson	CB	2023	No	No	SI
Mason Graham	DT	2023	No	No	TSN-2
Kris Jenkins	DT	2023	No	No	FWAA-2, AFCA-2
Mason Graham	DT	2024	Yes	Yes	AP, AFCA, FWAA, TSN, WCFF, USAT, CBS, Athletic, PFF, SI, ESPN
Dominic Zvada	K	2024	No	No	TSN, Athletic, ESPN
Will Johnson	CB	2024	No	No	AFCA-2, WCFF-2, CBS-2
Colston Loveland	TE	2024	No	No	FWAA-2
Kenneth Grant	DT	2024	No	No	AP-3
