= 1909 All-Western college football team =

American all-star college football team

The 1909 All-Western college football team consists of American football players selected to the All-Western teams chosen by various selectors for the 1909 college football season.

== All-Western selections ==
=== Ends ===
- Harlan Page, Chicago (ECP-1, WE)
- James Dean, Wisconsin (ECP-2, WE)
- Walter Henry Rademacher, Minnesota (ECP-1)
- Frederick L. Conklin, Michigan (ECP-2)

=== Tackles ===
- James Walker, Minnesota (ECP-1, WE)
- George Philbrook, Notre Dame (ECP-1)
- Ralph Dimmick, Notre Dame (WE)
- F. E. Boyle, Wisconsin (ECP-2)
- Homer W. Dutter, Indiana (ECP-2)

=== Guards ===
- Albert Benbrook, Michigan (ECP-1, WE) (CFHOF)
- Sam Dolan, Notre Dame (ECP-1, WE)
- Glenn D. Butzer, Illinois (ECP-2)
- Harry W. Powers, Minnesota (ECP-2)

=== Centers ===
- Andrew W. Smith, Michigan (ECP-2, WE)
- Henry E. Farnum, Minnesota (ECP-1)

=== Quarterbacks ===
- John McGovern, Minnesota (ECP-1, WE) (CFHOF)
- Otto E. Seiler, Illinois (ECP-2)

=== Halfbacks ===
- Dave Allerdice, Michigan (ECP-1, WE)
- Joe Magidsohn, Michigan (ECP-1, WE)
- William Lucas Crawley, Chicago (ECP-2)
- Harry "Red" Miller, Notre Dame (ECP-2)

=== Fullbacks ===
- Earle T. Pickering, Minnesota (ECP-1)
- Robert E. Vaughan, Notre Dame (WE)
- John Wilce, Wisconsin (ECP-2) (CFHOF)

== Key ==
Bold = consensus choice by a majority of the selectors

ECP = E. C. Patterson for Collier's Weekly

WE = Walter Eckersall in the Chicago Tribune

CFHOF = College Football Hall of Fame

== See also ==
- 1909 College Football All-America Team
