= 1910 All-Western college football team =

American all-star college football team

The 1910 All-Western college football team consists of American football players selected to the All-Western teams chosen by various selectors for the 1910 college football season.

== All-Western selections ==
=== Ends ===
- Stanfield Wells, Michigan (ECP, WE-1)
- Stanley Borleske, Michigan (WE-1)
- Otto E. Seiler, Illinois (ECP)
- Arthur Berndt, Indiana (WE-2)
- James Dean, Wisconsin (WE-2)

=== Tackles ===
- William P. Edmunds, Michigan (WE-1)
- James Walker, Minnesota (ECP, WE-1)
- Homer W. Dutter, Indiana (ECP, WE-2)
- Sylvester V. Shonka, Nebraska (WE-2)

=== Guards ===
- Albert Benbrook, Michigan (ECP, WE-1) (CFHOF)
- Glenn D. Butzer, Illinois (ECP, WE-1)
- Paul Belting, Illinois (WE-2)
- Ernest W. Baldwin, Michigan Agricultural (WE-2)

=== Centers ===
- John F. Twist, Illinois (ECP, WE-1)
- Sydney M. Collins, Nebraska (WE-2)

=== Quarterbacks ===
- John McGovern, Minnesota (ECP, WE-1) (CFHOF)
- Shorty McMillan, Michigan (WE-2)

=== Halfbacks ===
- Joe Magidsohn, Michigan (ECP, WE-1)
- Otto E. Seiler, Illinois (WE-1)
- Thomas Andrew Gill, Indiana (WE-2)
- Reuben Martin Rosenwald, Minnesota (ECP, WE-2)

=== Fullbacks ===
- Lisle Alexander Johnston, Minnesota (ECP, WE-1)
- Leon Exelby, Michigan Agricultural (WE-2)

== Key ==
Bold = consensus choice by a majority of the selectors

ECP = E. C. Patterson in Collier's Weekly

WE = Walter Eckersall in the Chicago Tribune

CFHOF = College Football Hall of Fame

== See also ==
- 1910 College Football All-America Team
