= 1910 All-America college football team =

Official list of the best college football players of 1910

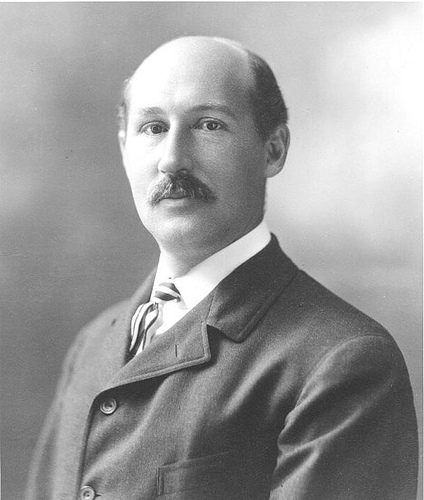
Walter Camp, the only "official" All-America selector in 1910

The 1910 All-America college football team is composed of college football players who were selected as All-Americans for the 1910 college football season. The only selector for the 1910 season who has been recognized as "official" by the National Collegiate Athletic Association (NCAA) is Walter Camp. Many other sports writers, newspapers, coaches and others also selected All-America teams in 1910. The magazine Leslie's Weekly attempted to develop a consensus All-American by polling 16 football experts and aggregating their votes. Others who selected All-Americans in 1910 include The New York Times, The New York Sun, and sports writer Wilton S. Farnsworth of the New York Evening Journal.

The 1910 Harvard Crimson football team compiled a record of 9–0–1 and outscored opponents 161 to 5. Harvard allowed only one team to score a point and played Yale to a 0–0 tie. A total of eight Harvard players were named first-team All-Americans by at least one selector. They are Hamilton Corbett, Robert Fisher, Richard Plimpton Lewis, Robert Gordon McKay, Wayland Minot, Lawrence Dunlap Smith, Percy Wendell, and Lothrop "Ted" Withington.

Only three players from schools outside of the Ivy League were selected as consensus first-team All-Americans. They are Albert Benbrook and Stanfield Wells from Michigan and James Walker of Minnesota.

== Walter Camp's "official" selections ==
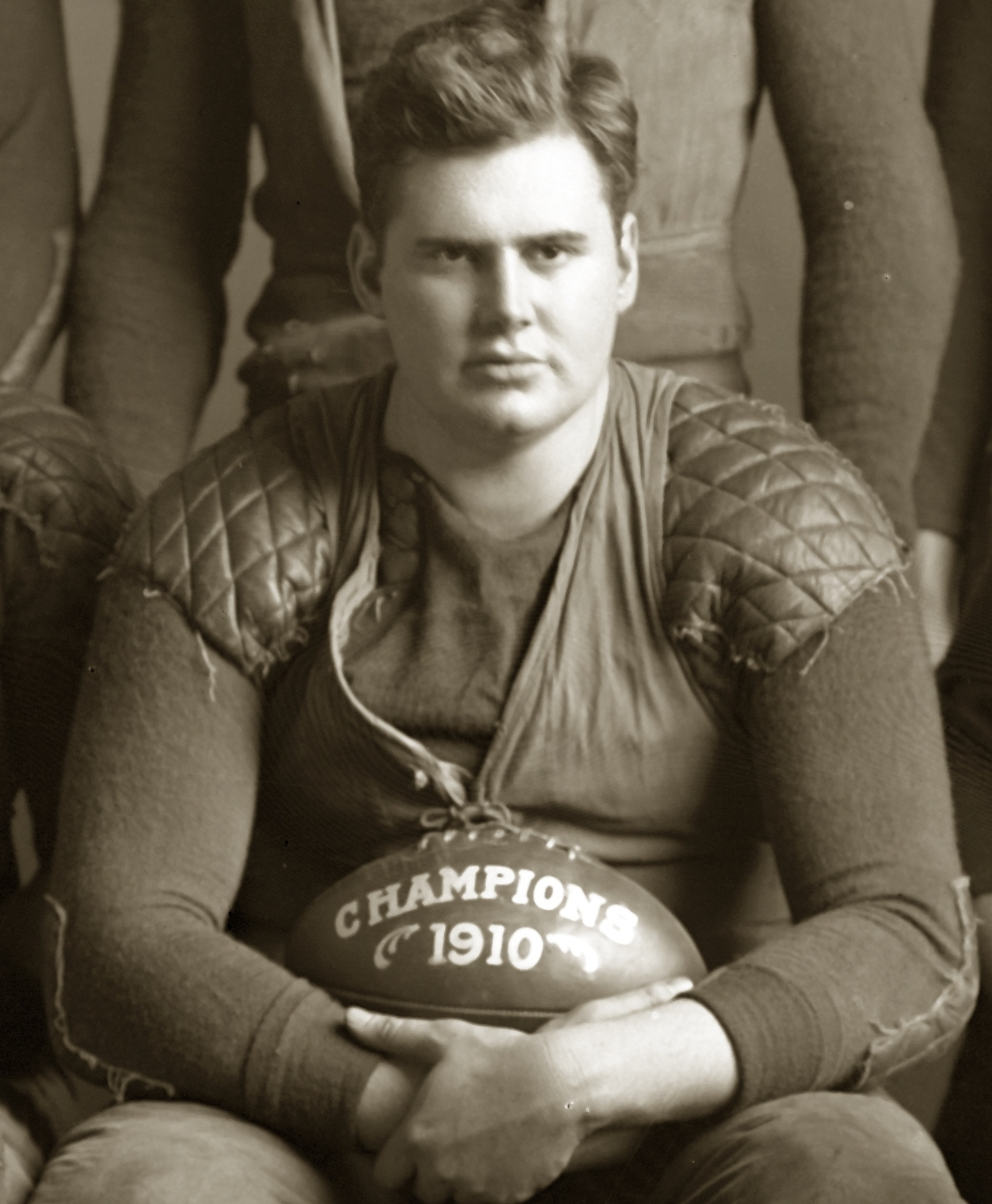
Albert Benbrook of Michigan

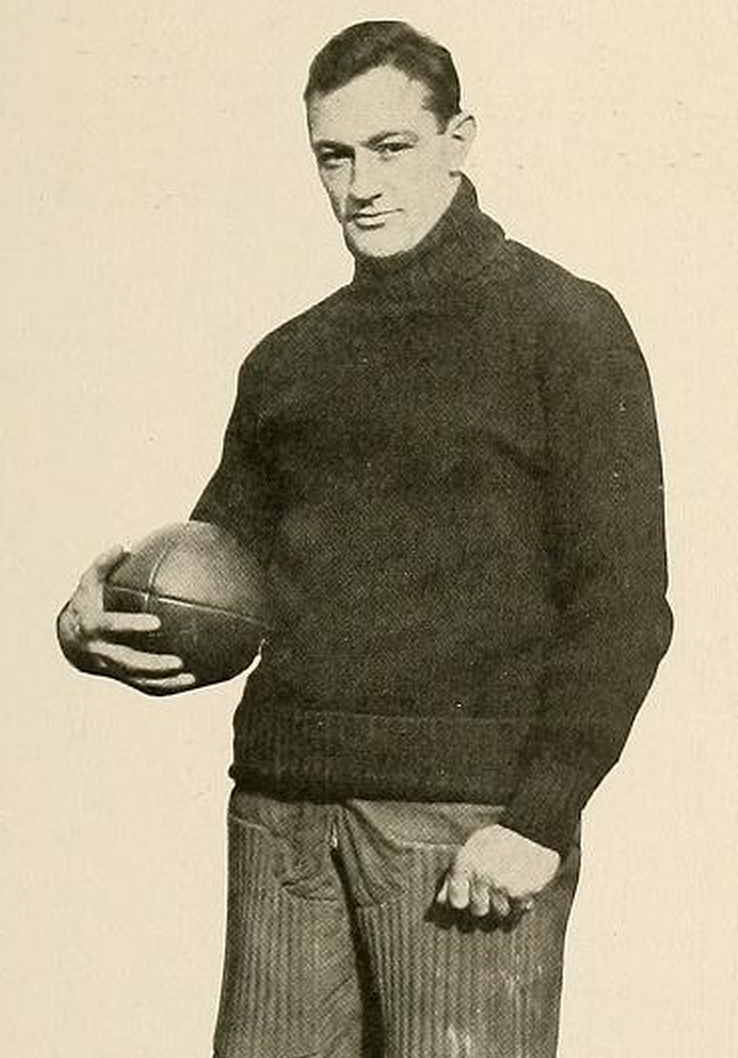
Leroy Mercer of Penn

The only individual who has been recognized as an "official" selector by the National Collegiate Athletic Association (NCAA) for the 1910 season is Walter Camp. Accordingly, the NCAA's official listing of "Consensus All-America Selections" mirrors Camp's first-team picks. Eight of Camp's first-team All-Americans in 1910 played on teams from the Ivy League. The only players recognized by Camp from outside the Ivy League were Albert Benbrook and Stanfield Wells from Michigan and James Walker of Minnesota.

Camp's first-team selections for 1910 were:

- Albert Benbrook, guard from Michigan. Benbrook was inducted into the College Football Hall of Fame in 1971. He weighed over 200 pounds, was considered "huge for his time," and was known as a "dominating force" due to his "exceptional quickness."
- Ernest Cozens, center from Penn. Cozens was "one of the first of the roving centers." In the 1910 game between Penn and the Haskell Indian School, Cozens intercepted a pass and returned it 80 yards for a touchdown. He was also the catcher for the Penn baseball team. After graduating from Penn, Cozens was a football coach at Carnegie Tech.
- Bob Fisher, guard from Harvard. Fisher later coached Harvard from 1919 to 1925 and was inducted into the College Football Hall of Fame in 1973.
- John "Kil" Kilpatrick. Kilpatrick played at the end position for Yale. He was inducted into the College Football Hall of Fame in 1955. He later ran Madison Square Garden for more than 25 years and oversaw the operations of the New York Rangers from 1934 to 1960. He was inducted into the Hockey Hall of Fame in 1960.
- Robert McKay, tackle for Harvard. McKay later served as the commander of the 305th Infantry Machine Gun Division, known as "Death", during World War I.
- Leroy Mercer, fullback for Penn, inducted into the College Football Hall of Fame in 1955.
- Talbot Pendleton, halfback from Princeton. Talbot was also a sprinter for Princeton's track team.
- Earl Sprackling, quarterback from Brown. Sprackling was inducted into the College Football of Fame in 1964.
- James Walker, tackle from Minnesota. Walker later became an orthopedic surgeon.
- Stanfield Wells, end from Michigan. Though known principally as an end, Wells was Michigan's first forward passer of note. He threw two passes to help Michigan win the Western Conference championship against Minnesota in 1910. He later played professional football.
- Percy Wendell, halfback from Harvard. He was elected to the College Football Hall of Fame in 1972. He later coached football at Boston University, Williams College, and Lehigh.

== Other selectors ==
By 1910, there was a proliferation of newspapers, sports writers, coaches and others choosing All-America teams. Recognizing the difficulties faced by any single person who could only watch one game per week, some began to seek better methodologies for selecting a true "consensus" All-America team. Leslie's Weekly sought to identify a consensus All-America team. Its team was compiled by Edward Bushnell, the editor of the official year book of the intercollegiate association of amateur athletics, by polling "sixteen men who he regards as the best experts in America." The experts polled were all associated with Eastern colleges and universities: Joseph B. Pendleton of Bowdoin, Dave Fultz of Brown, Carl S. Williams of Penn, Carl Marshall of Harvard, M.V. Bergen and James Hugh Moffatt of Princeton, Thomas Murphy of Harvard, A.C. Whiting and Charles Morice of Cornell, Clarence Weymouth of Yale, Fred Crolius of Dartmouth, Horatio B. Hackett of West Point, Walter R. Okeson of Lehigh, and Wilmer G. Crowell of Swarthmore. Eleven of the twelve players selected as consensus All-Americans by Leslie's Weekly played for Ivy League teams. The sole exception was Albert Benbrook of Michigan.

Bushnell's efforts revealed that two of Camp's picks were not truly "consensus" picks among the Eastern experts. The two players overlooked by Camp, but recognized by Leslie's Weekly, are:

- Lawrence Dunlap Smith, end from Harvard, was selected by 11 of 16 Eastern experts polled. Camp chose Stanfield Wells of Michigan instead of Smith.
- Jim Scully, tackle from Yale, was selected by 8 of 16 Eastern experts polled. Camp chose James Walker of Minnesota instead of Scully.

== Concerns over Eastern bias ==
The dominance of Ivy League players on Camp's All-America teams led to criticism over the years that his selections were biased against players from the leading Western universities, including Chicago, Michigan, Minnesota, Wisconsin, and Notre Dame. Many selectors picked only Eastern players. For example, Wilton S. Farnsworth's All-American eleven for the New York Evening Journal was made up of five players from Harvard, two from West Point, and one each from Yale, Princeton, Penn, and Brown.

The selectors were typically Eastern writers and former players who attended only games in the East. In December 1910, The Mansfield News, an Ohio newspaper, ran an article headlined: "All-American Teams of East Are Jokes: Critics Who Never Saw Western Teams Play to Name Best in Country -- Forget About Michigan, Minnesota and Illinois." The article noted: "Eastern sporting editors must be devoid of all sense of humor, judging by the way in which they permit their football writers to pick 'All-American' elevens. What man in the lot that have picked 'All-American' elevens this fall, saw a single game outside the North Atlantic States? With a conceit all their own they fail to recognize that the United States reaches more than 200 miles in any direction from New York. ... Suppose an Ohio football writer picked 'All-American' teams. Ohio readers would not stand for it. But apparently the eastern readers will swallow anything."

== All-Americans of 1910 ==
=== Ends ===
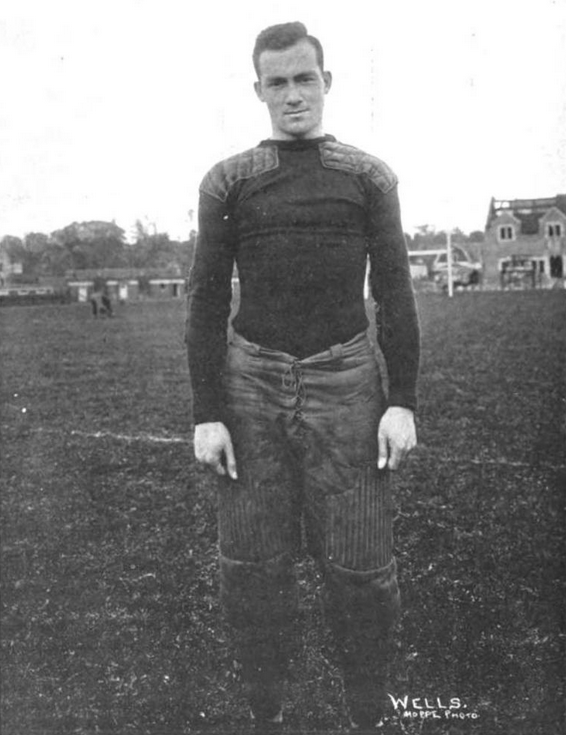
Stanfield Wells of Michigan

- **Stanfield Wells**, Michigan (WC–1; CP; OUT)
- **John Kilpatrick**, Yale (WC–1; LES-1 (16); CP; OUT; ES; NYT-1; TC-1; NYEJ; NYS; NYH; TEL; NYEW; PP-1; COY-1; WT; PD; NYG; NYMT; PT; ALS; PL; Penn)
- Lawrence Dunlap Smith, Harvard (WC–2; LES-1 (11); OUT; ES; NYT-1; TC-2; NYS; NYH; TEL; PP-1; PD; NYG; NYMT; PT)
- Richard Plimpton Lewis, Harvard (TC-1; NYEJ)
- Edward J. Daly, Dartmouth (WC–2; NYT-2; OUT; NYEW; PL)
- Springer H. Brooks, Yale (NYT-2; WT)
- Arthur Berndt, Indiana (OUT)
- William Marks, Penn (TC-2; PP-2)
- Woodcock, Lafayette (PP-2)
- Tom Piollet, Penn State (ALS; Penn)
- Harold Eyrich, Cornell (WC–3)
- James Dean, Wisconsin (WC–3)

=== Tackles ===
- **Robert McKay**, Harvard (WC–1; LES-1 (14); CP; OUT; ES; NYT-1; TC-1; NYEJ; NYS; TEL; NYEW; PP-1; COY-1; WT; PD; NYG; NYMT; PT; ALS; Penn)
- **James Walker** Minnesota (WC–1; TC-1; OUT)
- James W. "Jim" Scully, Yale (WC–2; LES-1 (8); ES; NYT-2; NYS; NYH; TEL; NYEW; PP-2; PD; NYMT; PL; Penn)
- Lothrop "Ted" Withington, Harvard (LES-2 (7); NYT-2; CP; OUT; NYEJ; NYH; PP-1; WT; NYG; PT; PL)
- Ralph W. "Bud" Sherwin, Dartmouth (NYT-1; TC-2)
- Brenton G. Smith, Brown (WC–2)
- Rodgers, Penn (TC-2)
- Alfred L. Buser, Wisconsin (OUT)
- Homer Dutter, Illinois (OUT)
- Rudolph "Rudy" Probst, Syracuse (OUT)
- William Munk, Cornell (PP-2)
- Huber “Polly” Grimm, Washington (WC–3)
- Sylvester V. Shonka, Nebraska (WC–3)

=== Guards ===
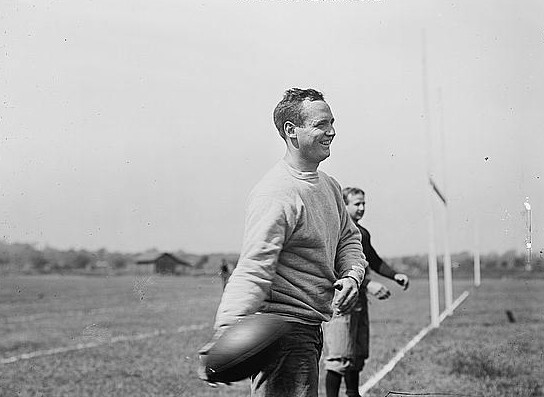
Bob Fisher of Harvard.

- **Albert Benbrook**, Michigan (College Football Hall of Fame) (WC–1; LES-1 (12); TC-1; CP; OUT; ES; TEL; PP-1; WT; PD; NYG; NYMT; PT; ALS; PL; Penn)
- **Bob Fisher**, Harvard (College Football Hall of Fame) (WC–1; LES-1 (11); CP; OUT; ES; NYT-1; TC-1; NYEJ; NYS; NYH; TEL; NYEW; PP-2; WT; PD; NYMT; ALS; Penn)
- Joseph L. Wier, West Point (WC–2; LES-2 (4); NYEJ; COY-1; PT)
- John Brown, Navy (College Football Hall of Fame) (WC–2; LES-2 (4); NYT-2; NYS; NYH; ALS [t]; PL)
- T. S. Wilson, Princeton (NYT-2; TC-2; NYEW; PP-1; NYG)
- Wayland Minot, Harvard (NYT-1)
- Glenn D. Butzer, Illinois (OUT; WC–3)
- George Bromley, Minnesota (TC-2)
- Edwin Foresman, Lafayette (PP-2)
- Will Metzger, Vanderbilt (WC–3)

=== Centers ===
- **Ernest Cozens**, Penn (WC–1; LES-1 (16); OUT; ES; NYT-1; TC-1; NYS; NYH; TEL; NYEW; PP-1; WT; NYG; NYMT; PT; ALS; Penn)
- Archibald Vincent Arnold, Army (OUT; TC-2; NYT-2; NYEJ)
- Effingham Morris, Yale (CP; OUT; COY-1; WC-2)
- Ralph Galvin, Pittsburgh (PD; PL)
- John Twist, Illinois (OUT)
- Harry Hartman, Syracuse (OUT)
- Forsman, Lafayette (OUT)
- Charles P. Sisson, Brown (WC–3)

=== Quarterbacks ===
- **Earl Sprackling**, Brown (College Football Hall of Fame) (WC–1; LES-1 (12); CP; OUT; ES; NYT-1; TC-2; NYEJ; NYS; NYH; TEL; NYEW; PP-2; COY-1; WT; PD; NYG; NYMT; PT; ALS; PL; Penn)
- Art Howe, Yale (College Football Hall of Fame) (WC–2; NYT-2; OUT; PP-1)
- John McGovern, Minnesota (College Football Hall of Fame) (WC–3; TC-1; OUT)
- John E. Ingersoll, Dartmouth (OUT; NYEW [fb])
- James Scott, Penn (OUT)
- Schef, Illinois (OUT)
- V. Ballou, Princeton (OUT)
- Ashel Cunningham, Indiana (OUT)
- James Dean, Wisconsin (OUT)
- G. H. Fletcher, Purdue (OUT)

=== Halfbacks ===
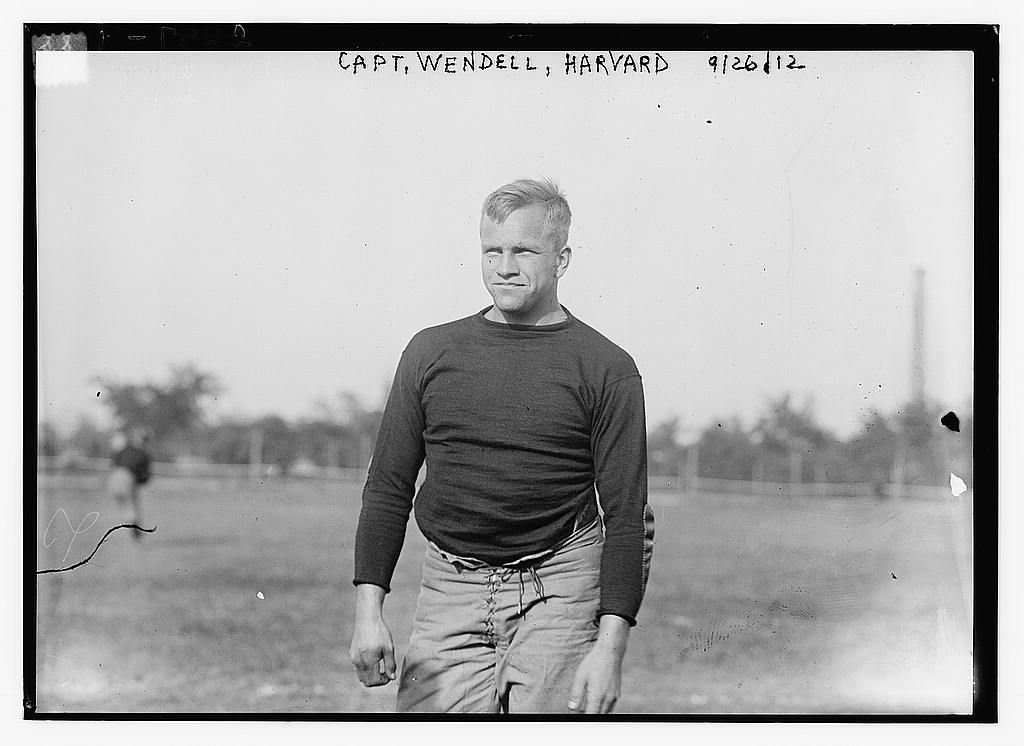
Percy Wendell of Harvard

- **Percy Wendell**, Harvard (College Football Hall of Fame) (WC–1; LES-1 (13); ES; NYT-1; TC-1; CP [fb]; OUT; NYS; NYH [fb]; TEL; NYEW; PP-1; COY-1; WT [fb]; PD; NYG; NYMT; PT; ALS; Penn)
- **Talbot Pendleton**, Princeton (WC–1; LES-1 (7); CP; OUT; NYT-2; TC-2; NYEJ; NYH; NYEW; WT; PL)
- Joe Magidsohn, Michigan (LES-2 (5); TC-1; CP; OUT; TEL; PP-2; WT; PD; NYG; NYMT; PT; ALS; PL; Penn)
- James Russell McKay, Brown (WC-2 [fb]; LES-2 (3); NYT-2 [fb]; TC-2; OUT; ES; NYS; PP-2; COY-1)
- Hamilton Corbett, Harvard (NYT-2; OUT; NYEJ)
- Fred "Tex" Ramsdell, Penn (WC-3; OUT; PP-1)
- Fred Daly, Yale (NYT-1; OUT)
- John Field, Yale (WC–2; OUT)
- John Dalton, Navy (WC–2)
- John Rosenwald, Minnesota(OUT)
- Thomas Andrew Gill, Indiana (OUT)
- William Crawley, Chicago (OUT)
- C. M. Taylor, Oregon (WC–3)

=== Fullbacks ===
- **Leroy Mercer**, Penn (College Football Hall of Fame) (WC–1; LES-1 (9); OUT; ES; TC-1; NYEJ; NYS; NYH [hb]; TEL; PP-1; COY-1; NYG; NYMT; PT; ALS; PL; Penn)
- John Dalton, Navy (NYT-1; OUT)
- Ed Hart, Princeton (LES-2 (3); TC-2; PP-2)
- Reuben Johnson, Minnesota (OUT)
- Pete Hauser, Carlisle (OUT)
- Tex Richards, Pittsburgh (PD)
- Ham Corbett, Harvard (WC–3)

=== Key ===
NCAA recognized selectors for 1910

- WC = Collier's Weekly as selected by Walter Camp

Other selectors

- LES = Leslie's Weekly, Consensus All-America team compiled by Edward Bushnell, editor of the official year book of the intercollegiate association of amateur athletics, by polling "sixteen men who he regards as the best experts in America." The experts polled were all associated with Easter schools: Joseph B. Pendleton of Bowdoin, Dave Fultz of Brown, Carl S. Williams of Penn, Carl Marshall of Harvard, M.V. Bergen and James Hugh Moffatt of Princeton, Thomas Murphy of Harvard, A.C. Whiting and Charles Morice of Cornell, Clarence Weymouth of Yale, Fred Crolius of Dartmouth, Horatio B. Hackett of West Point, Walter R. Okeson of Lehigh, and Wilmer G. Crowell of Swarthmore. The numbers in parentheses are the number of votes (out of 16 total) that the player received. Players not named to the consensus team, but who polled at least three votes, are identified as second team.
- OUT = Outing magazine, honor roll of the game's top players "chosen on the judgement of various coaches of college football elevens"; at some positions multiple selections without designation as first or second teams
- ES = Evening Standard. This was determined by the consensus among the various Eastern football experts who picked All-American teams.
- NYT = The New York Times
- TC = Tommy Clark
- NYEJ = Selected by sports writer, W.S. Farnsworth, of the New York Evening Journal
- NYS = The New York Sun
- NYH = New York Herald
- TEL = New York Telegraph
- NYEW = New York Evening World
- PP = The Philadelphia Press
- COY = Former Yale star Ted Coy
- CP = The Cincinnati Post
- WT = Washington Times
- PD = Pittsburgh Dispatch
- NYG = New York Globe, by Burton S. Brown
- NYMT = New York Morning Telegraph
- PT = Philadelphia Times
- ALS = Andrew Latham Smith, Penn coach for the Philadelphia Bulletin
- PL = Pittsburgh Leader
- Penn = The Pennsylvanian

Bold = Consensus All-American

- 1 – First-team selection
- 2 – Second-team selection
- 3 – Third-team selection

== See also ==
- 1910 All-Southern college football team
- 1910 All-Western college football team
