= Art Howe (American football) =

American football player, coach and teacher (1890–1955)

4th President of Hampton Institute
- In office 1930–1940
- Preceded by: George Perley Phenix
- Succeeded by: Malcolm Shaw MacLean

Personal details
- Born: Arthur Howe; March 3, 1890 South Orange, New Jersey, U.S.
- Died: March 28, 1955 (aged 65) Plymouth, New Hampshire, U.S.
- Relations: Samuel Chapman Armstrong (father in-law)
- Education: Yale University, Union Theological Seminary in the City of New York
- Occupation: Football player, coach, teacher, minister, university president
- Football career

Yale Bulldogs
- Position: Quarterback

Personal information
- Born: March 3, 1890; South Orange, New Jersey, U.S.
- Died: March 28, 1955 (aged 65); Plymouth, New Hampshire, U.S.

Career information
- College: Yale (1909–1911)

Awards and highlights
- National champion (1909); Consensus All-American (1911); 2× Second-team All-American (1910, 1909)

Arthur Howe (March 3, 1890 – March 28, 1955) was an American football player and coach, teacher, minister and university president. He played college football for Yale University from 1909 to 1911, was the quarterback of Yale's 1909 national championship team, and was a consensus first-team All-American in 1912. He was the head coach of the 1912 Yale football team. Howe was later ordained as a Presbyterian minister and taught at Eastern preparatory schools and at Dartmouth College. From 1930 to 1940, he was the president of Hampton University. He was posthumously inducted into the College Football Hall of Fame in 1973.

== Early life ==
Howe was born in South Orange, New Jersey, in 1890. His father, Solomon Howe (born April 1856), was a Massachusetts native and was a wholesaler dealer of dry goods. His mother, Mable Rose (Almy) Howe (born September 1863), was a New York native. Howe played high school football at Columbia High School in Maplewood, New Jersey and at The Hotchkiss School in Lakeville, Connecticut.

== Yale University ==
Howe enrolled at Yale University in 1908. He played for the Yale Bulldogs football team as a quarterback from 1909 to 1911. As a sophomore in 1909, Howe led the team to a perfect 10–0 record, as the Yale team outscored its opponents by a combined score of 209–0. At the end of the 1909 season, Howe was selected as a second-team All-American by Walter Camp. After another strong year in 1910, Howe was unanimously elected by his teammates as the captain of Yale's 1911 football team. As a senior, he set a collegiate record by returning 18 kicks in a November 1911 game against Princeton. After the 1911 season, Howe was selected as the first-team All-American quarterback by Collier's Weekly (as selected by Walter Camp), The New York Globe, W.S. Farnsworth, Dr. Henry L. Williams, and Charles Chadwick.

While attending Yale, Howe led a religious life at the university, studied well, and played hockey.

At the end of December 1911, Howe agreed to return in the fall of 1912 as the school's head football coach, after graduating with Yale's Class of 1912. In his one year as head coach, Howe led the 1912 Yale football team to a 7–1–1 record, with the only loss coming against that year's national championship team from Harvard.

During the period from 1899 to 1912, Yale had 14 different head football coaches in 14 years – despite compiling a combined record of 127–11–10 in those years. During that 14-year span, the Yale football team has also been recognized as the national championship team by one or more of the major national championship selectors on seven occasions – 1900 (Billingsley, Helms, Houlgate, National Championship Foundation, Parke Davis), 1901 (Parke Davis), 1902 (Parke Davis), 1905 (Parke Davis, Whitney), 1906 (Billingsley, Parke Davis, Whitney), 1907 (Billingsley, Helms, Houlgate, National Championship Foundation, Parke Davis, Whitney), and 1909 (Billingsley, Helms, Houlgate, National Championship Foundation, Parke Davis).

== Seminary and teaching career ==
After leaving Yale, Howe enrolled at the Union Theological Seminary in the City of New York. He graduated from the seminary in 1916 and became a Presbyterian minister.

In June 1916, Howe was hired as a teacher and coach at the Loomis Institute (now known as The Loomis Chaffee School) in Windsor, Connecticut. In a draft registration card completed in June 1917, Howe indicated that he was living in Windsor, Connecticut, and was employed as the chaplain at the Loomis Institute.

In 1918, Howe was the head football coach at Trinity College in Hartford, Connecticut.

In approximately 1920, Howe left the Loomis School and joined the faculty of the Taft School in Watertown, Connecticut. Howe was a teacher and the chaplain at the Taft School through most of the 1920s. At the time of the 1920 United States census, Howe was living in Watertown with his wife Margaret and their two children. Howe's occupation at the time was listed as a professor at the Taft School.

After leaving the Taft School, Howe became a professor of citizenship at Dartmouth College. He remained at Dartmouth from approximately 1929 to 1930. At the time of the 1930 United States census, Howe was living in Hanover, New Hampshire, with his wife Margaret and their daughter and four sons. His occupation was listed as a minister and teacher at Dartmouth College.

== Hampton Institute ==
In November 1930, Howe was selected as the president of Hampton Institute (now known as Hampton University), a historically black university in Hampton, Virginia. The university had been founded by Howe's father-in-law, Gen. Samuel Chapman Armstrong, in 1869. He served as the president at Hampton for nearly a decade. In the last couple years of his administration, Howe faced increasing agitation from students and alumni seeking reforms, including an increase in African-American faculty representation and equal pay for African-American faculty members. Howe resigned as Hampton's president effective June 1940. Howe's wife, Margaret Armstrong Howe, continued to serve as a trustee of Hampton until her death in 1971.

== Later life ==
From 1940 to 1949, Howe was the managing director of the Welfare Federation of the Oranges and Maplewood in New Jersey. In a draft registration card completed in 1942, Howe indicated that he was living with his wife Margaret in East Orange, New Jersey, and that he was employed by the Welfare Federation. He also served as chairman of the Tilton, New Hampshire School for Wayward Boys.

== Family, death and posthumous honors ==
In August 1916, Howe was married to Margaret Marshall Armstrong in a ceremony held at the Chocorua Chapel on Chocorua Island in Lake Asquam, near Chocorua, New Hampshire. They had a daughter (Alice) and four sons (Harold, Arthur Jr., Richard and Sydney).

In 1955, Howe died after a short illness at Sceva Speare Memorial Hospital in Plymouth, New Hampshire.

He was posthumously inducted into the College Football Hall of Fame in 1973.

== Head coaching record ==
Year	Team	Overall	Conference	Standing	Bowl/playoffs
Yale Bulldogs (Independent) (1912)
1912	Yale	7–1–1			
Yale:		7–1–1			
Trinity Bantams (Independent) (1918)
1918	Trinity	0–1–1			
Trinity:		0–1–1			
Total:		7–2–2			
