= Stanfield Wells =

American football player (1889–1967)

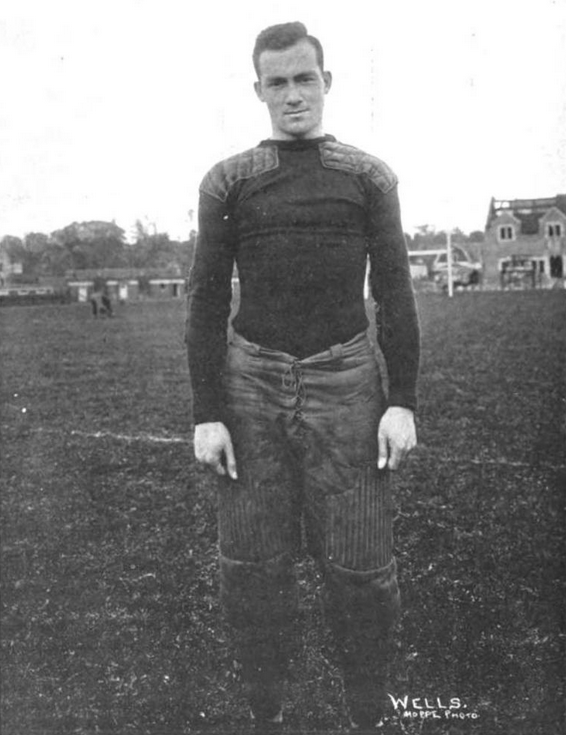
- Stanfield Wells became an All-American in 1910, photo c. 1911.

Profile
- Position: End

Personal information
- Born: July 25, 1889
- Died: August 17, 1967 (aged 78)

Career information
- High school: Massillon Washington (Massillon, Ohio)
- College: Michigan

Awards and highlights
- Consensus All-American (1910); Third-team All-American (1911); 2× All-Western (1910–1911)

Stanfield McNeill Wells (July 25, 1889 – August 17, 1967) was an All-American football player for the University of Michigan Wolverines football team from 1909–1911. He was the first in a long line of All-Americans to come out of Massillon Washington High School, and was one of the pioneers of the forward pass. Though known principally as an end, Wells was Michigan's first forward passer of note. He threw two passes to help Michigan win the Western Conference championship against Minnesota in 1910. He played professional football after college and wrote a chapter of a book on playing the end position. He later became the manager of an insurance company in Nashville, Tennessee.

== Massillon Washington High School ==
Wells attended Washington High School in Massillon, Ohio. He played left halfback in high school and graduated in 1907. His high school coach Fritz Merwin was a volunteer who helped the players get organized.

Massillon's Washington High School has produced more than ten All-Americans, with Wells being the first and others including Harry Stuhldreher, Ed Molinski, Lin Houston, Chris Spielman, and Coach Paul Brown. In 1964, the school honored its first ten All-Americans by creating an All-American Hall of Fame at the school. At the time of the induction ceremony, Wells (who was in his 70s) was unable to attend but wrote a letter that was published in the Massillon newspaper. In the letter, Wells recalled the early days of football in Massillon:

“The old days. After all the fall of 1906 is a far piece back, and high school football then was a mighty casual and simple thing. That was my senior year and I was a ‘new boy’, having just moved to Massillon that summer from the wide open spaces of South Dakota, Wyoming and Nebraska. The first day at school several of my classmates came around to suggest that of course I was coming out for football; and although I protested that I had never had a ball in my hands, they countered with the argument that I was a good sized lump of a boy and would make a fine prospect. So I promised. Well the only preparation necessary was to take an old pair of shoes down to the town cobbler and have some cleats nailed on them. I think the athletic association must have had some football pants, but I do remember distinctly that you had to furnish your own stockings (any color) and an old sweater. Put these on and you were in business. I can’t believe that there were more than 11 candidates out because I made the team the first afternoon. Nor did we have a regular coach. A boy named Fritz Merwin, who I think had played the year before was our coach. If you ask me, he’s the one whose picture ought to be hanging up around there someplace. He didn’t get paid anything, and if a coach ever had an awkward squad of 11 nit-wits, he did. But he was out there every afternoon, early and late teaching us fundamentals instead of fancy razzle-dazzle plays, and in the end it paid off because we won a few games. I can’t remember who we beat, but I do recall, painfully even after this lapse of time, that our friends over at the county seat (Canton, Ohio) took us to the cleaners twice.”

== University of Michigan ==
=== 1909 season ===
After graduating from high school in Massillon, Wells went north to play for Coach Fielding H. Yost at the University of Michigan. In 1909, he started seven games at right tackle on at team that was 6–1, outscored opponents 115–34, and lost its only game to Notre Dame, 11–3.

=== 1910 season ===
In 1910, Michigan went 3–0–3 and Wells started the first three games at right tackle and the final three at right end. According to the 1911 Michiganensian yearbook, Wells “started out as a tackle but was shifted to end, and here he so distinguished himself in the last three games, that he was Camp’s other selection for the honorary team.”

In December 1910, two Wolverines, Wells and Albert Benbrook, were named first-team All-Americans by Walter Camp. Penn was the only other school with two players on Camp’s 1910 All-American team.

In the second to last game of the 1910 season, a scoreless tie with the University of Pennsylvania, Wells made his second start as an end. It appeared Wells had scored the winning touchdown, but the play was called back. The 1911 Michiganensian described the play this way: "'Shorty' McMillan sent 'Stan' Wells down the side lines. Then the Michigan team opened up and Bill Edmunds was given the ball. Bill stepped back and sent a beautiful long pass to 'Stan' Wells. The pigskin came sailing through the air on a perfect line, Wells grabbed it and ran for a touchdown. Instantly the small Michigan rooting contingent rose as one man and cheered until their voices failed. Then Umpire Crowell asked for the ball. It was handed him, and he walked back to where it had been put in play and told the Michiganders to start anew. Wells had stepped out of bounds for an instant, just as he received the ball."

=== The 1910 Little Brown Jug game ===
Wells drew national attention for his performance in Michigan's final game of the season, a 6–0 win over Minnesota. That game secured the Western Conference championship for Michigan, and Wells was credited with the win after he led a fourth quarter drive and scored the winning touchdown with three minutes remaining. In selecting Wells to his All-American team, Camp credited Wells with Michigan's win over Minnesota, saying that “had it not been for Wells, Michigan would have failed of its victory.” He said that Wells “practically alone and unaided” won the championship game against Minnesota.

According to newspaper accounts, and a lengthy account of the game in the 1911 Michiganensian yearbook, the game was a scoreless tie late in the fourth quarter. Michigan took possession at the forty-yard line with 60 yards to go for a touchdown. The Michiganensian described the game-winning drive this way: "With the sun already far down in the West, . . . and the ball in Michigan's possession, sixty yards from Minnesota’s goal, the unexpected did take place. 'Shorty' McMillan signaled for a forward pass. . . . 'Stan' (Wells) ran backwards and threw far and true to Borleske, who was thirty yards down the field before a Swede tackled him. Minnesota was slightly worried. Thirty yards on one play, and it seemed certain that Michigan would now try some old football. Instead, 'Shorty' called for the same play and again Wells threw true to Borleske, who was tackled on the Gopher two yard line. Minnesota, desperate, tried to check the onslaught, but it was like trying to turn a freshet from its course. Wells hit the line but was thrown back. Again the auburned lad struck the line. Minnesota blocked his path. 'Stan' twisted slightly and slipped between two men. When the officials separated the men, the ball was on the far side of the Gopher goal line."

A wire service account picked up in newspapers across the country described the events this way: "Wells, whose name is written large tonight, ran out and sent the ball straight to Borleske. The crowd cheered itself hoarse, for this was one of the few successful forward passes of the game and it had netted twenty-six yards. Michigan lined up quickly. The same play was hardly to be expected so soon, and in exactly the same way. Yet, that was the strategy. Wells ran to the sideline as before and threw diagonally down the field as before to Borleske. Michigan now had four yards to go. Every spectator on his feet, the Minnesota crowd crying, 'hold,' 'hold.' It was a serious moment for both sides, and they took time to breathe and collect themselves for the supreme effort. Wells was hurled against center, but the whole Minnesota team got into the defense and stopped the play about where it had started. The next attack was deceptive. Wells found a hole at left tackle, and although the enemy fell upon him furiously, they were too late, for he twisted across the line and emerged a hero. Ann Arbor is his private property tonight, as well as the rest of collegiate Michigan."

Harold Titus of The Detroit News wrote that "the forward pass and terrible determination" won the Minnesota game for Michigan. Of Wells' touchdown, Titus wrote: “Stanfield Wells was Michigan’s last hope. Once he tried the line and the Gopher, snarling, checked him. Again he tried it and this time his thudding feet sounded the death of Minnesota’s hopes and carried to the ears of his fellow team players the clang of victory.”

=== 1911 season ===
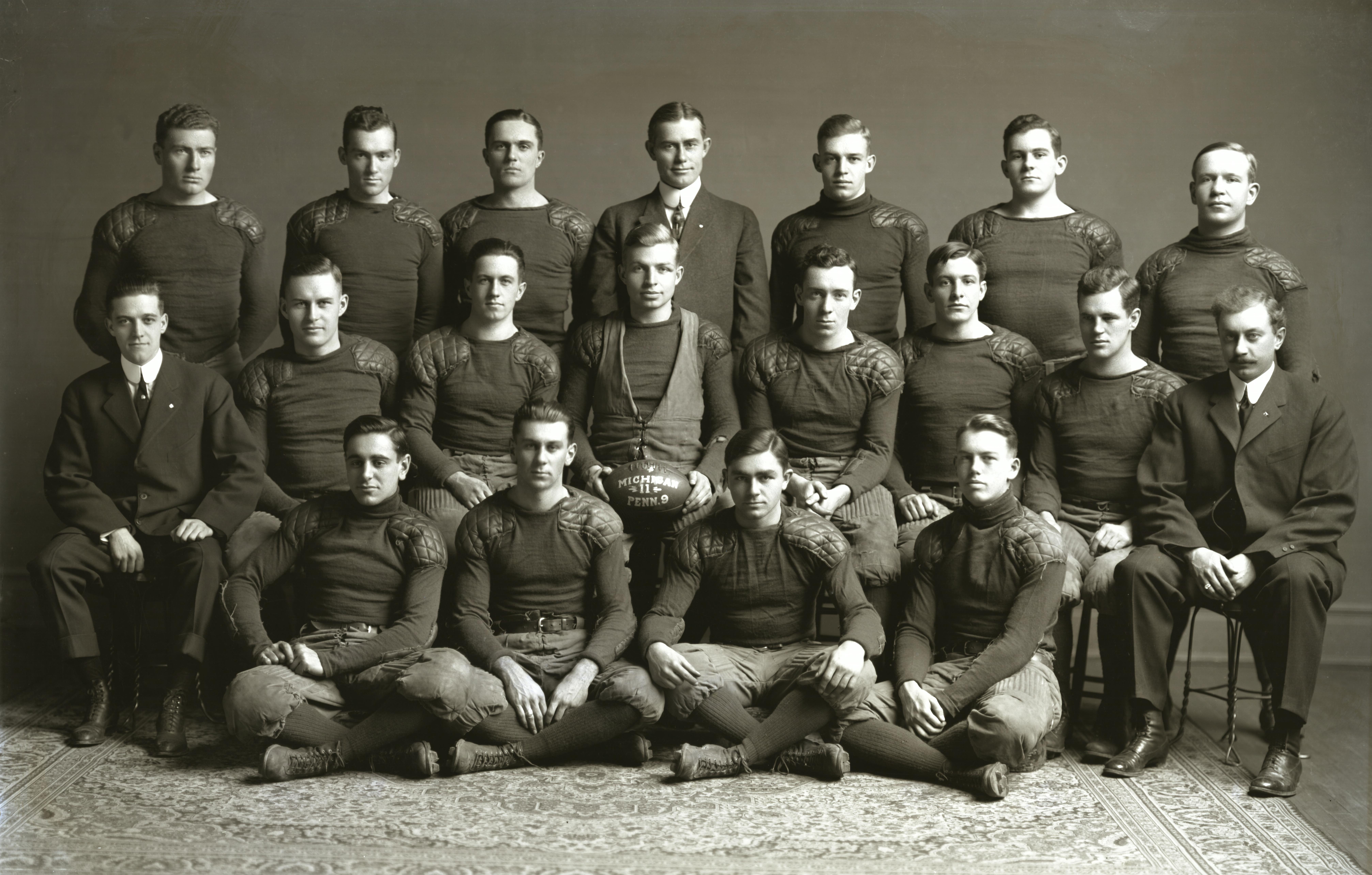
1911 Michigan Wolverines football team

In 1911, Michigan was 5–1–2 and Wells started four games at right end and three games at right halfback.

Speaking in 1964, Wells recalled the words of his old coach: "I have heard my old coach at Ann Arbor, Fielding H. Yost say it a dozen times. Give him 11 men, big or little, short or tall, thin or fat, and if every last one of them could and would block and tackle, he would guarantee to go out and beat any time in the country, every Saturday afternoon for an entire season."

== Later life ==
In 1914, Wells published a chapter in "The Book of Athletics" providing details and advice on playing the end position in football.

A 1964 article in the Massillon, Ohio newspaper reported that Wells played professional football in the years after graduating from Michigan, but records of professional football in the 1910s are hard to verify.

Wells later became a successful executive with a life and casualty insurance company in Nashville, Tennessee. In 1964, Wells was retired with homes in Sun City, Arizona and a summer home in Cedarville, Michigan.

== See also ==
- List of Michigan Wolverines football All-Americans
