= Earl Sprackling =

American football player (1890–1980)

- Sprackling in 1910

Brown Bears
- Position: Quarterback

Personal information
- Born: September 6, 1890; Cleveland, Ohio, U.S.
- Died: May 27, 1980 (aged 89); Los Angeles, California, U.S.
- Listed height: 5 ft 9 in (1.75 m)
- Listed weight: 150 lb (68 kg)

Career information
- College: Brown (1908–1911)

Awards and highlights
- First-team All-American (1910); Second-team All-American (1911); Third-team All-American (1909)
- College Football Hall of Fame (Class of 1964)

William Earl Sprackling (September 6, 1890 – May 27, 1980) was an American football quarterback. He was elected to the College Football Hall of Fame in 1964. A native of Cleveland, Ohio, Sprackling was the quarterback for the Brown University football team in 1909, 1910, and 1911. He was selected as an All-American at the quarterback position in 1910 and has been rated as the best college football player in the United States in 1910.

== Football player ==
=== All-American ===
A historic account of Sprackling refers to him as a "cocky little quarterback" who weighed only 155 pounds. Another account referred to him as "[a] heady field general, clever in the open, a deadly tackler and an expert field goal kicker." Ivy League historian George Trevor called him an "eye-dazzler in the open field, a flashy punt-handler and bulls-eye passer. In addition, he could drop-kick field goals from nearly mid-field under pressure. As a quarterback, he was a marvel at calling plays, picking out soft spots in the defense of an opponent unerringly."

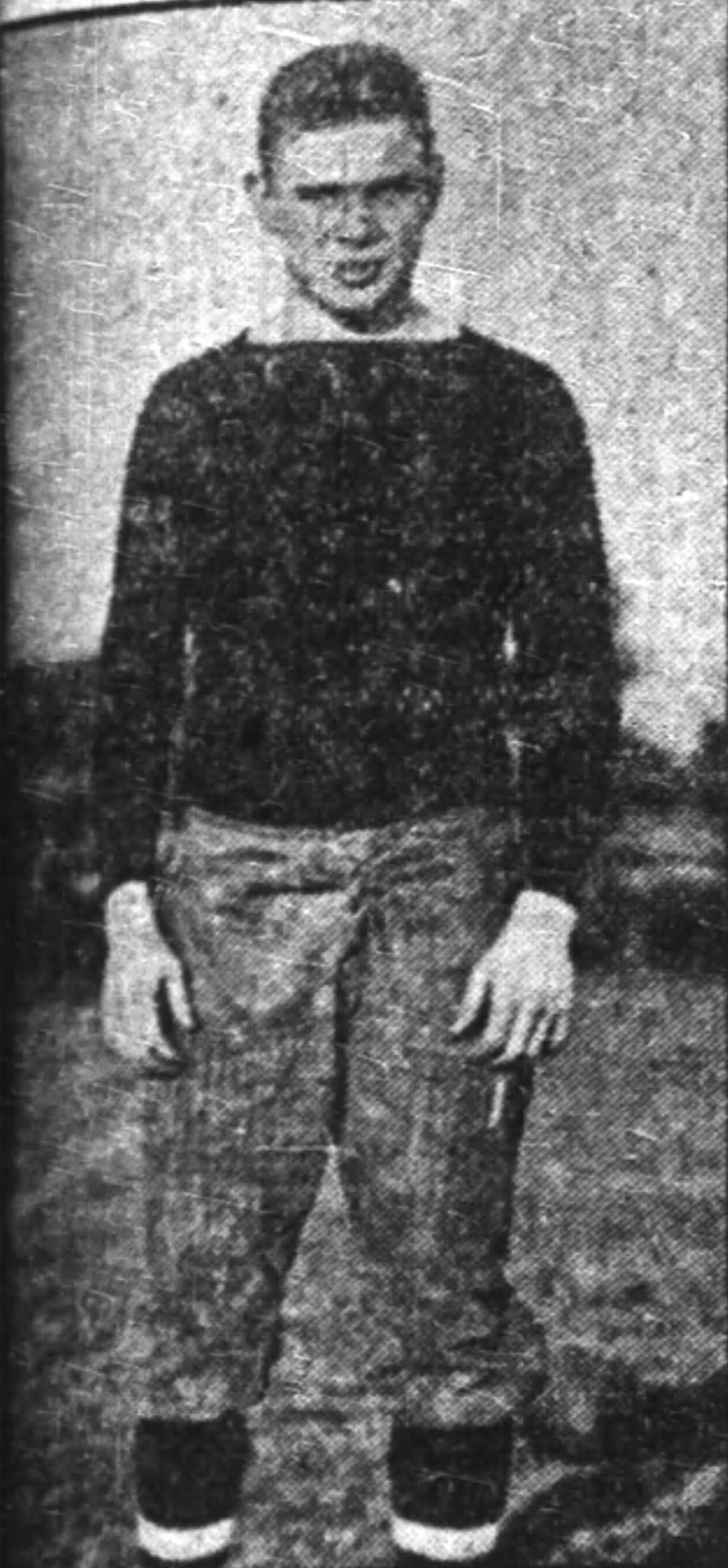
Sprackling, circa 1910

Despite his size, Sprackling was chosen by Walter Camp for his All-America teams three times, as a third-team selection in 1909, a first-team selection in 1910, and a second-team selection in 1911. He was reportedly the unanimous choice of all the experts to pick an All-American team in 1910, including Camp (published in Collier's Weekly), the Evening Standard (determined by the consensus among the various Eastern football experts who picked All-American teams), Leslie's Weekly (compiled by Edward R. Bushnell, by polling 16 Eastern experts), and W.S. Farnsworth, (for the New York Evening Journal).

The "ESPN College Football Encyclopedia: The Complete History of the Game" reviewed the records of college football in the years before the Heisman Trophy was awarded and selected one player each year as the deserving recipient if the Heisman had been awarded in the early years of college football. Sprackling was selected as the deserving recipient for 1910. Sprackling was also picked as the top player of 1910 in a 1913 article identifying the top football player of each year from 1902–1912. Sports Illustrated reached the same conclusion in a 2008 article picking the players deserving of the Heisman from the game's early years: "Sprackling had a fine season, but one game won him the Heisman. Brown had not won a game over Yale until Spackling helped guide his club past the Elis in 1910."

Sprackling was recognized as the greatest football player of 1910 despite competing against Jim Thorpe. Sprackling later recalled playing against Thorpe and the Carlisle team: "I tripped Jim Thorpe instead of tackling him. The fans gave me the booing I deserved."

=== 1910 Yale game ===
Sprackling won his greatest acclaim for his performance in Brown's November 1910 victory over Yale. In 18 prior matches, Brown had never beaten Yale. Sprackling played a central role in the victory, kicking three field goals, completing five of six passes for 180 yards and a touchdown, carrying the ball nine times for 36 yards, and returning 13 punts for 150 yards and five kickoffs for 90 yards. Brown had 608 total yards in the Yale game, and Sprackling was responsible for 456 of them. After the game, Brown students "carried Sprack on their shoulders, hugged and patted him and then the girls started to kissing him."

Walter Camp wrote the following about Sprackling's performance against Yale: "Rarely has a quarterback on an American college eleven come out of a big contest with so fine a record. Sprackling by his unexcelled play in every department demonstrated more clearly than ever that he is the best quarterback in the country." In 1960, Sprackling and other members of the 1910 team that beat Yale was honored at a 50th anniversary reunion of the team.

=== Top scorer in 1911 ===
Sprackling was also selected as the captain of the 1911 Brown Bears football team. During the 1911 season, Sprackling scored 44 points, including seven touchdowns and three field goals. This was a higher point total than any other Eastern football player in 1911. Also in 1911, Sprackling wrote an article about playing the quarterback position that was published in newspapers. Among other things, Sprackling gave advice on signal calling:

"A team is guided by signals by the quarterback and he should know them by heart, frontwards, backwards and in his dreams. He should give them in a low, smooth, even tone, not in a series of short, shrill, jerky numbers. The tone should come from the diaphragm and not the chest."

=== College Football Hall of Fame ===
In 1964, Sprackling was inducted into the College Football Hall of Fame. His biography at the Hall of Fame notes:

"Bill Sprackling was Brown University's original 'Defiant One'. A peppery field general, Sprackling frequently chided his teammates over missed assignments and teased opponents with his refusal to don helmet and pads. This, from a man with matinee-idol features and a fragile-appearing 150-pounds over a 5-9 frame."

== Later life ==
After graduating from Brown, Sprackling worked for a time as an assistant football coach at Brown. Brown played in the 1916 Rose Bowl game with star back Fritz Pollard. When the hotel in Pasadena refused to allow Pollard, one of the first African Americans to play in the NFL, Sprackling demanded to see the manager. According to an account published in Sports Illustrated: "When the clerk refused, Sprackling pounded on the desk bell and shouted, 'If there isn't a room for Fritz Pollard, none of us wants one.' The manager appeared, and Pollard got a room."

Sprackling later had a career in business and became the President and Chief Executive Officer of the Anaconda Wire and Cable Company.
