= Talbot Pendleton =

American football player

Profile
- Position: Halfback

Career information
- College: Princeton

Awards and highlights
- National champion (1911); Consensus All-American (1910)

Talbot Pendleton was an American football player. He attended Princeton University, where he played football, baseball, and ran track. In 1910, he was named a consensus All-American by Collier's Weekly, Leslie's Weekly, and sportswriter W.S. Farnsworth.
