= Albert Benbrook =

American football player (1887–1943)

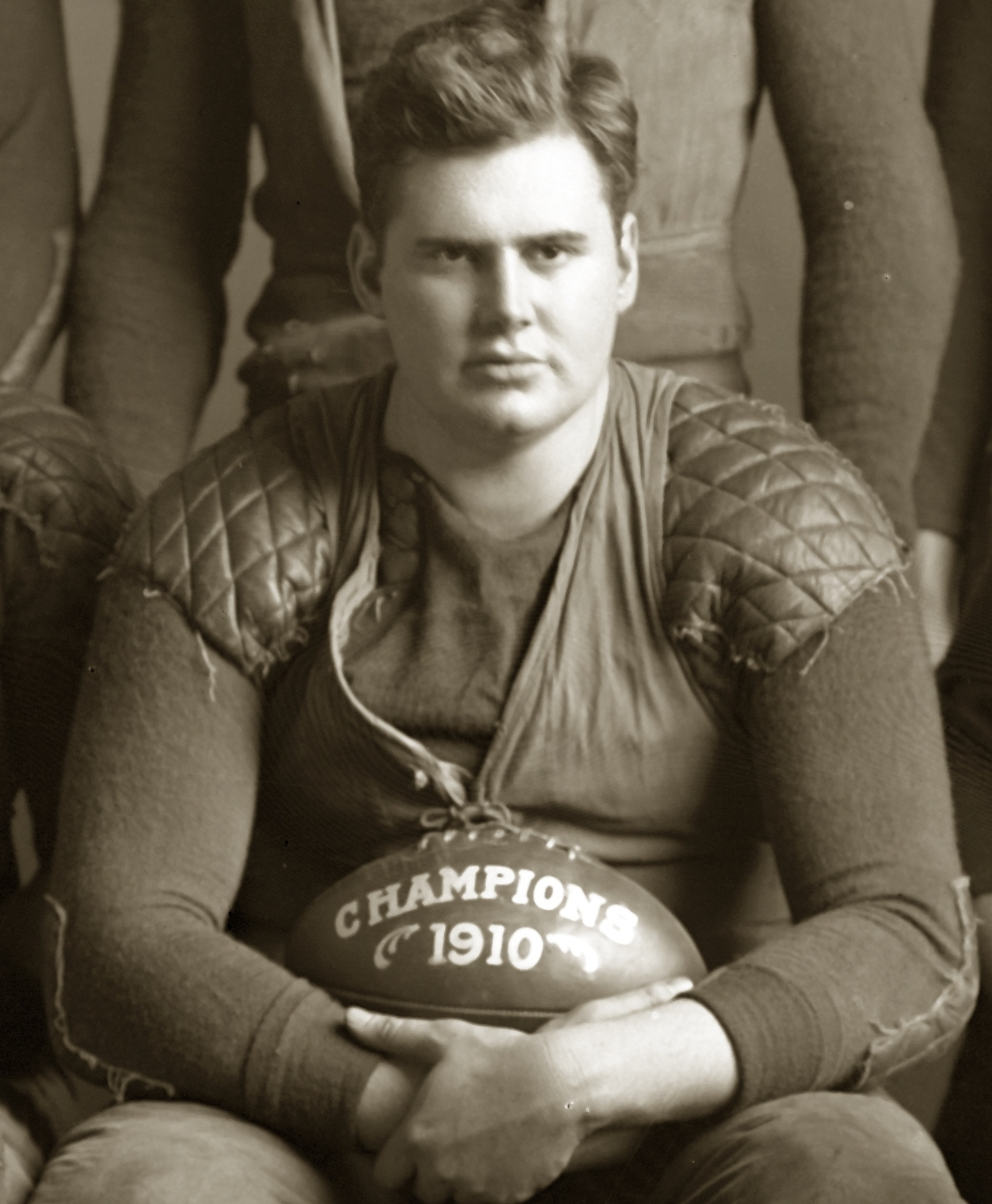
- Benbrook in 1910 (from Michigan football team photograph)

Profile
- Position: Guard

Personal information
- Born: August 24, 1887; Texas, U.S.
- Died: August 16, 1943 (aged 55); Dallas, Texas, U.S.

Career information
- College: Michigan (1908–1910)

Awards and highlights
- 2× Consensus All-American (1909, 1910); 3× First-team All-Western (1908, 1909, 1910); First-team All-Service (1917)
- College Football Hall of Fame

Albert "Benny" Benbrook (August 24, 1887 – August 16, 1943) was an American football guard who played for the University of Michigan Wolverines from 1908 to 1910. He was chosen by Walter Camp as a first-team All-American in 1909 and 1910 and was Michigan's team captain in 1910. He is considered one of the best college football linemen in the early years of the sport. He served in the military and later had a career in the office furniture and seating businesses. He was posthumously elected to the College Football Hall of Fame in 1971.

== Early life ==
Benbrook was a born in 1887 at either Benbrook, or Fort Worth, Texas. His father, Monroe Benbrook (1860-1927), was an Illinois native, and his mother, Lilly (Draper) Benbrook (1864-1934), was an immigrant from Canada. The family moved to Chicago in 1898. He was a "weight man" and football player at Chicago's prestigious Morgan Park Academy before enrolling at Michigan.

== All-American football player at Michigan ==
Benbrook enrolled at the University of Michigan in 1907 and played on the "scrubs" team as a freshman. He made the varsity football team in 1908 and was the second heaviest man on the team behind the team's captain Germany Schulz.

=== 1909 season ===
In 1909, Benbrook started all seven of the Wolverines' games at left guard. He helped lead the team to a 6-1 record, including wins over Ohio State (33-6), Syracuse (43-0), Penn (12-6), and Minnesota (15-6). The team's only loss was an 11-3 defeat against Notre Dame on November 6, 1909. No other team scored more than six points against the Wolverines that year, and they outscored their opponents 115 to 34. At the end of the 1909 season, Benbrook was selected by Walter Camp as a first-team guard on the 1909 College Football All-America Team. He was one of two players from outside the Ivy League to be picked for Camp's first team. He was also the unanimous choice of 13 eastern critics who met to select the All-American team.

=== 1910 season ===
In January 1910, Benbrook was elected captain of the Michigan team. He initially lost a close election to end, J. Joy Miller, but Miller was barred from the team. Miller was removed by the faculty when it was learned he had failed to enroll in classes in the fall of 1909.

In the summer of 1910, Benbrook challenged heavyweight boxing champion Jack Johnson to a boxing match.

The 1910 Michigan Wolverines football team finished with a 3-0-3 record. In one of the lowest scoring seasons in school history, the team scored only 29 points and allowed only nine points. They played to a scoreless tie against Penn, and played to 3-3 ties against both Ohio State and Case.

The final game of the 1910 season was the Little Brown Jug game against Minnesota. Fielding H. Yost rated the 1910 Minnesota game as one of "the greatest game he ever saw." According to accounts of the game, Benbrook and Stanfield Wells were "at their very peak that day," as Michigan won, 6-0. There was no score late in the game, when a forward pass took Michigan to the Minnesota three-yard line. After Michigan ran twice without success, Benbrook called for a run to his side. Pushing Minnesota tacklers aside he opened a hole that led to a touchdown and the only scoring of the game.

At the end of the 1910, Benbrook was selected by Walter Camp for the second consecutive year as a first-team player on his 1910 College Football All-America Team. In announcing the selection, Camp said: "Benbrook is a born player. Last year he showed great strength and dash, and an ability to follow the ball; this year he has improved in every line and there is no match for him on the gridiron." When Outlook magazine selected its "honor list" for 1910, Benbrook was the only player unanimously chosen for a position.

== Honors and accolades ==
The University of Michigan Athletics History web site describes Benbrook's contributions this way: "Football critics regard Benbrook as the first of the great running guards. Despite his giant 240 pound frame, Benbrook moved with cat-like quickness and was faster than most backs."

After choosing Benbrook to his All-American teams in 1909 and 1910, Walter Camp said of Benbrook: "He leads his mates across the line with his quick, ripping charge that simply smothers the opposition. A tremendous player."

Walter Eckersall described Benbrook as the greatest guard in history. And in 1951, legendary Illinois coach Robert Zuppke chose Benbrook as a guard for his first-team All-Time All-American team. Another writer concluded: "There have been many great linesmen, but his record and the verdict of many experts seems to put Benbrook in advance of them all."

In 1971, he was posthumously inducted into the College Football Hall of Fame. Benbrook's biography at the Hall of Fame notes: "A testament to the ability of Albert Benbrook was that he was the first western linemen to become a two-time All-American. Weighing over 200 pounds he was considered huge for his time. What made Benbrook such a dominating force was his exceptional quickness".

In 2005, he was selected as one of the 100 greatest Michigan football players of all time by the "Motown Sports Revival," ranking 22nd on the all-time team.

== Service in World War I ==
When Benbrook enlisted in the U.S. Army during World War I, his participation received considerable publicity. In November 1917, eight All-American football players, including Benbrook and Michigan's James B. Craig and Ernest Allmendinger, were made officers in a ceremony in Chicago. In March 1918, Benbrook's photograph was published in newspapers around the country with the following caption: "Al Benbrook, the old Michigan football star and regarded by many as the greatest guard ever developed in America is soon to buck the Hun's line in the greatest game of all. Benbrook is now a lieutenant stationed at Camp Zachary Taylor." An article published the following month featured the same theme: "The foremost football guard ever developed is soon to go over to buck the Hun line in the greatest game of all".

== Family and later years ==
Benbrook married Dena Prehl on January 7, 1914, in Chicago. They had a son, James Benbrook, born in approximately 1922. The lived in the Rogers Park section of Chicago.

Benbrook was employed in the office furniture and seating business throughout his adult life. During the 1920s, he was a member of his father's office furniture business (Monroe Benbrook & Co., also known as Monroe Benbrook & Son) in Chicago. He also served as an official for Big Ten Conference football games. He was employed as a salesman by American Seating Company from 1931 until his death in 1943.

In August 1943, Benbrook died at age 55 of a coronary occlusion while on a business trip in Dallas. He was buried at the Acacia Park Cemetery and Mausoleum in Chicago.

== See also ==
- List of Michigan Wolverines football All-Americans
