= John McGovern (American football) =

American football player (1887–1963)

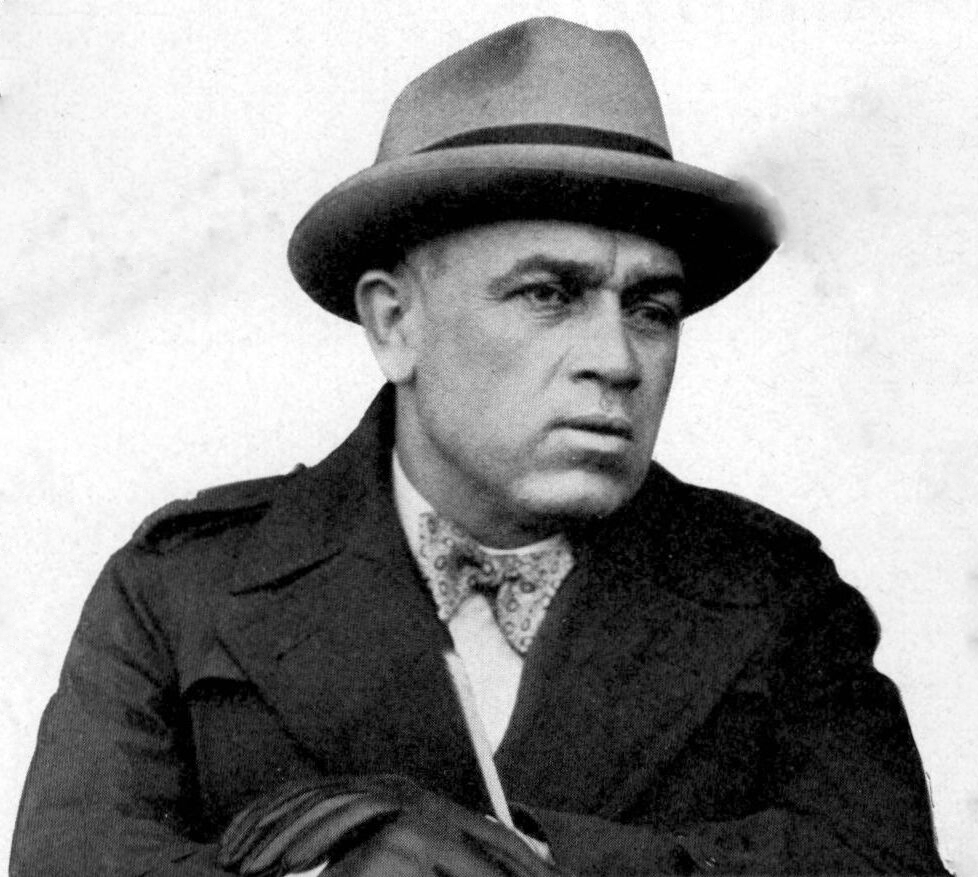

Minnesota Golden Gophers
- Position: Quarterback

Personal information
- Born: September 15, 1887; Arlington, Minnesota, U.S.
- Died: December 13, 1963 (aged 76); Le Sueur, Minnesota, U.S.
- Listed height: 5 ft 9 in (1.75 m)
- Listed weight: 155 lb (70 kg)

Career information
- College: Minnesota (1908–1910)

Awards and highlights
- Consensus All-American (1909); Third-team All-American (1910); 3× First-team All-Western (1908, 1909, 1910)

John McGovern (September 15, 1887 – December 13, 1963) was an American college football player. He was elected to the College Football Hall of Fame in 1966.

== Biography ==
McGovern was born in Arlington, Minnesota, and attended high school in Arlington. McGovern played college football for the University of Minnesota, and was the junior captain and quarterback at the University of Minnesota, leading them through play against the Intercollegiate Conference of Faculty Representatives. McGovern was named an All-American by the Walter Camp Football Foundation and Look Magazine in 1909. McGovern played for the Minnesota Golden Golphers football team under coach Henry L. Williams. While at Minnesota, McGovern was a member of Alpha Tau Omega fraternity, and Phi Delta Phi, a law society.

After college graduation, he worked as a sports editor for a Minnesota newspaper and then practiced law in Washington D.C. McGovern died on December 13, 1963, in Le Sueur, Minnesota.

== See also ==
- Minnesota Golden Gophers football under Henry L. Williams

== In literature ==
In F. Scott Fitzgerald's This Side of Paradise, John McGovern was on the mind of protagonist Amory Blaine.
