= Ernest Cozens =

American football player and college administrator (1888–1929)

- photograph of Cozens, circa 1910

Penn Quakers
- Position: Center

Personal information
- Born: November 24, 1888
- Died: June 8, 1929 (aged 40)

Career information
- College: Penn (1910)

Awards and highlights
- Consensus All-American (1910)

Ernest Brazier Cozens (November 24, 1888 – June 8, 1929) was an American football player and college administrator. He was one of the first "roving centers" in American football and was named an All-American in 1910.

== Athlete ==
Born in Haddonfield, New Jersey, Cozens attended the Haverford School where he played football, baseball and cricket. He enrolled at the University of Pennsylvania in 1907 and became one of the greatest athletes in the school's history. He was selected as an All-American at the center in 1910, and also won All-Eastern honors in baseball. Cozens was the starting center for Penn in 1909 and 1910 and was elected captain of the 1910 team. Cozens was "one of the first of the roving centers." In the 1910 game between Penn and the Haskell Indian School, Cozens intercepted a pass and returned it 80 yards for a touchdown. He was also the catcher for the Penn baseball team.

== Coach and administrator ==
After graduating from Penn, Cozens was a football coach at Carnegie Tech and a baseball coach at Shady Side Academy.

In 1922, Cozens was hired as the graduate manager of athletics at Penn. In that capacity, he was one of the organizers of intercollegiate boxing and served as the President of the Eastern Intercollegiate Boxing Association. He also helped organize and served as President of the Eastern Intercollegiate Baseball League.

== Family and death ==
Cozens was married in 1919 to Amelia Schmertz. They had four children, Ernest B. Cozens, Jr. (born c. 1917, Amelia Cozens (born c. 1920), William Cozens (born c. 1924) and Lee Cozens (born c. 1927). He died suddenly of heart failure while sitting in his office at Penn. He was age 40 when he died.

== Head coaching record ==
=== College football ===
Year	Team	Overall	Conference	Standing	Bowl/playoffs
Carnegie Tech Tartans (Independent) (1911)
1911	Carnegie Tech	4–5			
Carnegie Tech:		4–5			
Total:		4–5			
