= James Walker (American football player) =

American football player (1890–1973)

Profile
- Position: Tackle

Personal information
- Born: March 22, 1890
- Died: September 1, 1973 (aged 83)

Career information
- High school: Los Angeles
- College: Minnesota

Awards and highlights
- All-American (1910); 3× First-team All-Western (1908, 1909, 1910)

James Cloudsley Walker Jr. (March 22, 1890 – September 1, 1973) was an American football player. He played college football at the tackle position for the University of Minnesota. He was selected as a first-team All-American by Walter Camp in 1910. He was also selected by E.C. Patterson of Collier's as an All-Western player in 1910.

Walker attended Los Angeles High School. From there, he enrolled in medical study at Minnesota and played football for the Golden Gophers for two years. He graduated from the Medical College of Virginia in 1914. He was an intern at Park View Hospital in Rocky Mount, North Carolina, and at Minneapolis City Hospital. In 1915, he became a fellow in orthopedic surgery at Minnesota's Mayo Foundation. He later practiced as an orthopedic surgeon in Dayton, Ohio, serving for a time as the chief of the orthopedic staff at Miami Valley Hospital.
