= Joe Magidsohn =

American football player and official (1888–1969)

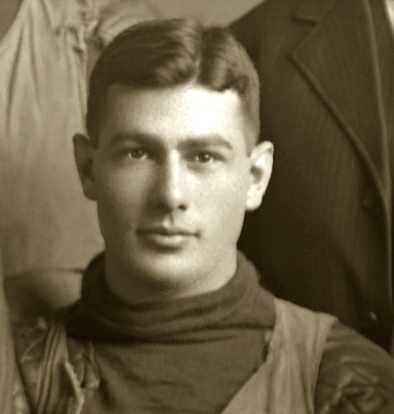

Michigan Wolverines
- Position: Halfback

Personal information
- Born: December 20, 1888; Tukums, Russian Empire (now Latvia)
- Died: February 14, 1969 (aged 80); Oak Park, Michigan, U.S.

Career information
- College: Michigan (1909–1910)

Awards and highlights
- Second-team All-American (1909); First-team All-Western (1909)

Joseph Magidsohn (December 20, 1888 – February 14, 1969) was an American football player and official. He played halfback for the University of Michigan Wolverines in 1909 and 1910 and was selected as a second-team All-American by Walter Camp in 1909 and a first-team All-American in 1910. He was the first Jewish athlete to win a varsity "M" at the University of Michigan and is the first athlete known to have refused to compete on the Jewish High Holy Days.

== Biography ==
=== Early life ===
In 1888, Magidsohn was born in Tukums, a town that was then part of the Russian Empire, but which is now part of Latvia, and was Jewish. He was the son of Herman Magidsohn, a merchant born in Russia in July 1863, and Bessie Magidsohn, born in August 1864 in Russia. His father immigrated to the United States in 1889, and his mother followed in 1892 with two sons, Joe and Sam.

At the time of the 1900 U.S. Census, the family had grown to four children and was living in Oliver Township in The Thumb region of Michigan. Magidsohn attended high school in Elkton, Michigan.

After graduating from high school, Magidsohn enrolled at Alma College. He had never played football before and took up the sport at Alma.

=== University of Michigan ===
In 1907, Magidsohn transferred to the University of Michigan where he played two years of varsity football (1909–10) under head coach Fielding H. Yost. Magidsohn was 5 feet, 10 inches tall and weighed 163 pounds when he played football at Michigan.

Magidsohn and Dave Allerdice were the starting halfbacks for the 1909 Michigan football team that finished the season with a 6–1 record and outscored its opponents 116–34.

In Michigan's 15–6 win over Minnesota in 1909, Magidsohn scored both of Michigan's touchdowns, including a run for a touchdown in the first half and a 35-yard (32 m) interception return for a touchdown in the second half.

==== 1909 football season ====
The 1909 season marked the first time that any school from the "West" defeated one of the "Big Four" eastern schools, as Michigan defeated Penn by a score of 12–6 in Philadelphia. Penn came into the 1909 Michigan game with a 23-game winning streak in which they had allowed their opponents only 44 points. Magidsohn scored both of Michigan's touchdowns in the 1909 win over the Penn, including a 20-yard (18 m) touchdown reception from Allerdice and a 40-yard (37 m) run around Penn's right end for a touchdown.

Magidsohn later said of the Penn game: "That 1909 Michigan-Penn game is the one I regard as my greatest... My All-America teammate, halfback and captain, Dave Allerdice, had a broken left hand so I was obliged to do most of the ball carrying."

At the end of the 1909 season, eastern football expert Walter Camp selected both of Michigan's halfbacks (Magidsohn and Allerdice) as a second-team All-Americans. Both Michigan halfbacks were also picked by Walter Eckersall as first-team selections for his All-Western team.

==== 1910 football season ====
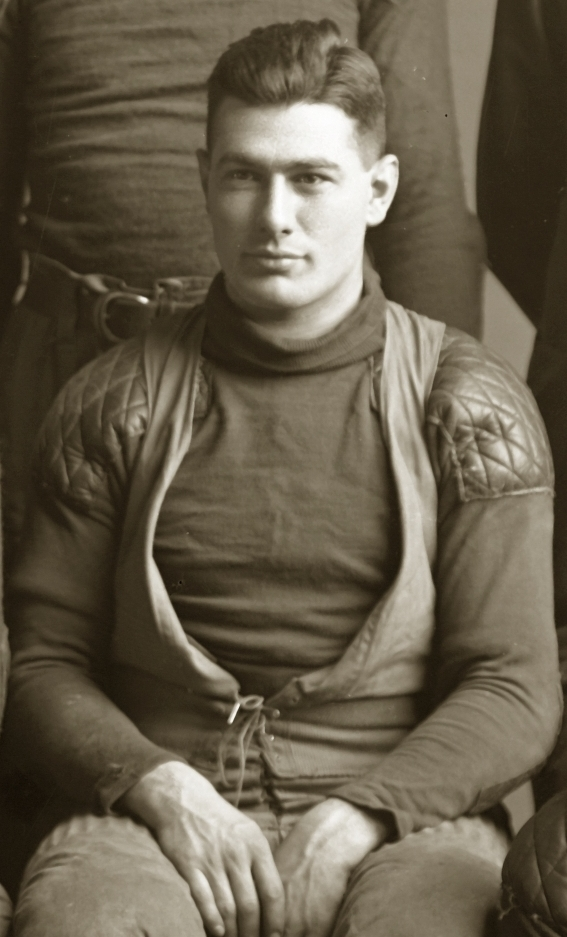
Magidsohn from the 1910 Michigan football team photograph

In 1910, Magidsohn started all six games at left halfback for an undefeated Michigan team (3–0–3) that outscored its opponents 29–9. Following Michigan's win over Syracuse in November 1910, the press called Magidsohn, who scored both of Michigan's touchdowns, the "Star of the Game" and noted that "his plunges were one of the features of the game." At the end of the 1910 season, Magidsohn was chosen by at least a dozen selectors as a first-team member of the 1910 College Football All-America Team. He was also selected by E.C. Patterson as a first-team All-Western halfback in 1910.

During Magidsohn's two seasons on the Michigan football team, the Wolverines lost only one game.

==== First Jewish letter winner at Michigan ====
Magidsohn was the first Jew to win an "M", the varsity letter awarded to competitors on the University of Michigan's varsity sports teams. After Magidsohn broke the barrier, other Jewish football players starred for Michigan, including All-Americans Benny Friedman, Harry Newman, Merv Pregulman and Dan Dworsky. According to several publications on Jews in sports, Magidsohn was the first athlete known to have refused to play on the Jewish High Holy Days.

Magidsohn later recalled that Coach Yost "reluctantly excused me from workouts for two days to attend Rosh Hashanah services." When teammates learned that Magidsohn had gotten two days off for the Holy Days, several reportedly responded, "Next year I'm going to be a Jew."

=== Later life ===
External images
- via Detroit Free Press (September 27, 1936)
- Joe Magidsohn, Big Ten Official, Demonstrates Latest Signs to Indicate Infraction of Football Rules
- Latest Signs to Indicate Infraction of Football Rules

After graduating from Michigan, Magidsohn served as a Big Ten Conference football official from 1912 to 1946 and was often assigned to officiate at many of the sport's biggest events, including the Army–Navy Game, the Rose Bowl, and the College All-Star Game.

In a World War I draft registration card completed in June 1917, Magidsohn stated that he was a naturalized United States citizen residing in Chicago, working as a civil engineer, and married with one child. At the time of the 1920 U.S. Census, Magidsohn was listed as a civil engineer residing in Chicago with his wife Jennie (née, Golden), age 30, son Elliot, age 5, and daughter Dorothy (age 2 years, 1 month).

Magidsohn was one of the organizers of Knollwood Country Club, its first secretary and its second president. He was also a former president of the Men's Club of Temple Beth El and served on the board for six years. He also served on the boards of the Jewish Community Center and the University of Michigan Alumni Association. he died in Oak Park Michigan in 1969 at age 80

== Hall of fame ==
He was inducted into the International Jewish Sports Hall of Fame in 1999.

== See also ==
- Michigan Wolverines football All-Americans
- 1909 College Football All-America Team
- 1910 College Football All-America Team
- List of select Jewish football players
