= James Russell McKay =

American football player, attorney and banker

Profile
- Position: Halfback

Personal information
- Born: May 16, 1889; Youngstown, Ohio, U.S.
- Died: October 16, 1966 (age 77); Youngstown, Ohio, U.S.

Career information
- College: Brown

Awards and highlights
- Second-team All-American (1910)

James Russell McKay (May 16, 1889 – October 16, 1966) was an American football player. A native of Youngstown, Ohio, McKay played college football at the halfback position for Brown University in 1909 and 1910 and was selected as the captain of the 1910 Brown Bears football team. In 1910, he was selected as a first-team All-American by the Evening Standard, as determined by the consensus among the various Eastern football experts who picked All-American teams. He was also named a first-team All-American by The New York Sun, and by Ted Coy, and as a second-team All-American by Walter Camp. After graduating from Brown, McKay returned to Youngstown where he worked as a lawyer. He became a vice president at Home Savings & Loan in Youngstown. He died in Youngstown in 1966 at age 77. He was posthumously inducted into the Brown Hall of Fame in 1971.
