= Frederick L. Conklin =

American football player and coach

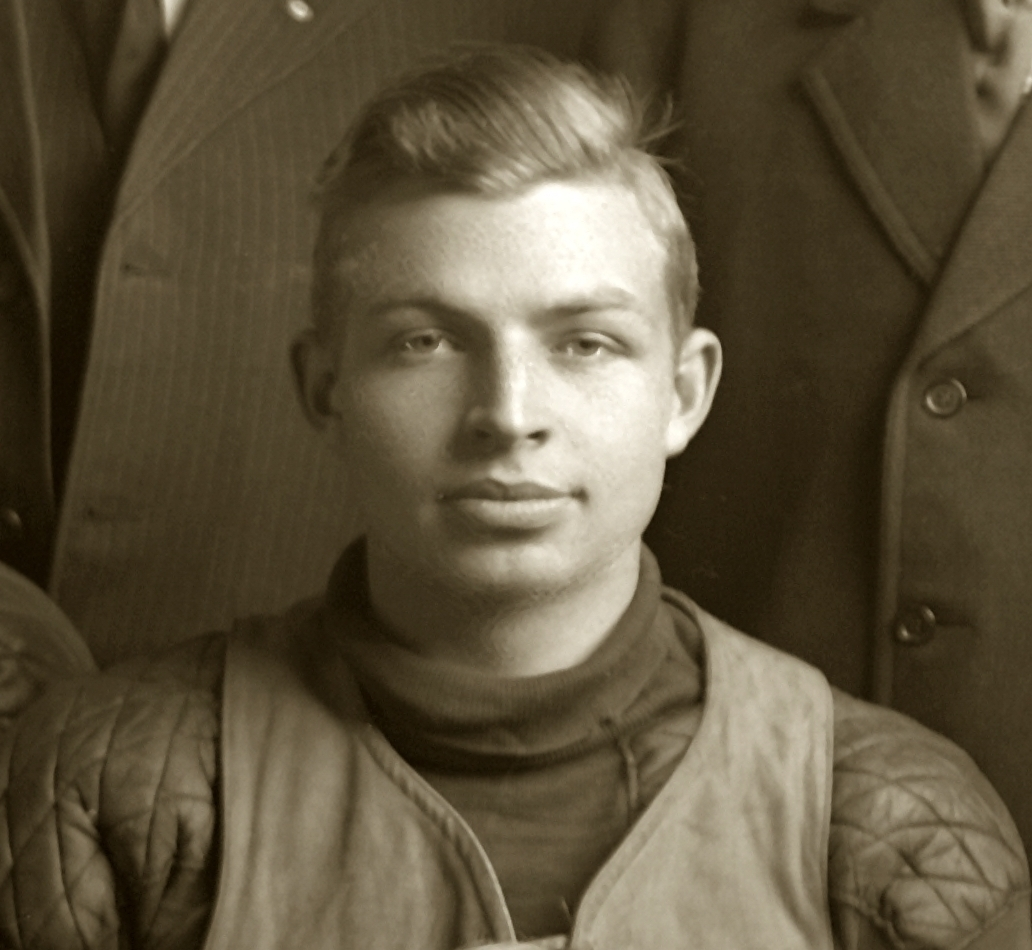

Profile
- Positions: End, Tackle, Guard

Personal information
- Born: April 12, 1888; Manchester, Michigan, U.S.
- Died: December 25, 1974 (aged 86); San Diego, California, U.S.

Career information
- College: University of Michigan

Awards and highlights
- U.S. Navy Legion of Merit (1942); All-Western team (1911); Outing magazine Honor List (1911)

Frederick L. Conklin (first name also spelled Fredric; April 12, 1888 – December 25, 1974) was an American football player and coach, medical doctor and naval officer. He played football for Fielding H. Yost's University of Michigan teams from 1909 to 1911 and was selected as an All-Western player in 1911. He spent 32 years as an officer in the U.S. Navy, reaching the rank of rear admiral after serving in World War I and World War II. He received the Legion of Honor for establishing a mobile hospital in New Caledonia in 1942 and later presented John F. Kennedy with a Navy and Marine Corps Medal for heroism in rescuing members of the crew of the PT 109.

== Michigan ==
A native of Manchester, Michigan, Conklin attended Ann Arbor High School before enrolling at University of Michigan. He played at the left end and right guard and left tackle positions for Fielding H. Yost's Michigan football teams from 1909 to 1911. He was also elected captain of the 1911 Michigan team. At the end of 1911 season, Conklin was selected as an All-Western player and named to Outing magazine's "Honor List" as one of the four best players at the left end position in the country. After completing his undergraduate education at Michigan, Conklin enrolled in medical school at Michigan and served as an assistant football coach under head coach Yost in the 1912 season. He graduated from the University of Michigan Medical School in 1914.

== Naval career ==
In September 1914, Conklin enlisted in the U.S. Navy and was commissioned as a lieutenant junior grade. He attended a six-week Naval training school in Washington, D.C. to qualify as a navy surgeon. He was promoted to the rank of lieutenant upon the U.S. entry into World War I in April 1918. During World War I, Conklin served aboard the cruisers USS Milwaukee and USS Brooklyn and in the Far East at naval hospitals in Cacaco and Cavite in the Philippines and at the naval hospital in Yokohama, Japan. Conklin later recalled the advances made in battlefield medical care during World War I:

"In all wars prior to the World War, four times as many sailors and soldiers died from diseases as were killed by the enemy. Had this ratio been maintained, the World War would have been terminated in two years because of the lack of manpower. The Germans lost more than 1,000,000 soldiers killed in combat during the first thirty months, while their loss by disease was 60,000 instead of the expected disease loss of 4,00,000. Therefore, the military value of application of the principles of modern medicine cannot too highly be evaluated."

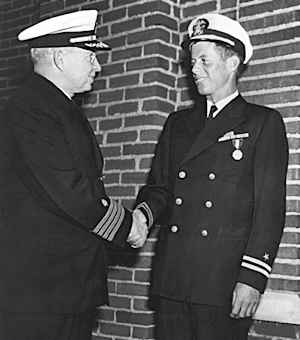
Conklin awarding John F. Kennedy the Navy and Marine Corps Medal.

After the end of World War I, Conklin continued to serve in the navy at various naval hospitals and aboard naval vessels. He was promoted to the rank of lieutenant commander in July 1921, commander in October 1931, and captain in 1939.

At the time of the U.S. entry into World War II, Conklin served as the medical officer in command of the Chelsea Naval Hospital in Chelsea, Massachusetts. He was assigned to overseas duty and set up a mobile hospital in New Caledonia one month after embarking from San Diego. He received the Legion of Merit for exceptionally meritorious conduct in the performance of outstanding services and achievements in establishing the mobile hospital. He also served on the staff of Gen. Douglas MacArthur in July 1945 as liaison officer of the Fifth Marine Division assigned to the Sixth Army for the planned invasion of Japan. On June 12, 1944, Conklin presented Lt. John F. Kennedy with the Navy and Marine Corps Medal for heroism in rescuing members of the crew of the PT 109.

At the end of World War II, Conklin was placed in command of the U.S Navy special hospital in Palm Beach, Florida. In January 1946, Conklin was commissioned as a rear admiral and became the medical officer of the Ninth Naval district headquartered at the Great Lakes Naval Training Station in Great Lakes, Illinois.

== Later life ==
In September 1949, Conklin retired from the navy at age 63. He was then hired as the head of the Berrien County Hospital at Berrien Center, Michigan. Conklin was credited with having "performed miracles in bringing the hospital up to standards considered normal of first run institutions." Conklin resigned the post in 1953 after complaining that he could not conduct a good operation unless he a free hand in hiring staff and control of medical operations.
