= John Field (American football) =

American football player and coach (1886–1979)

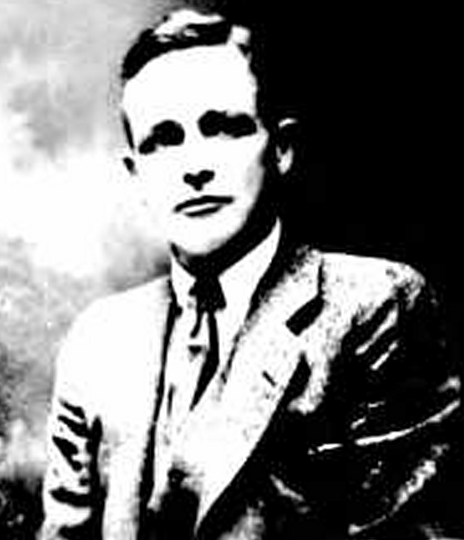
- John Field from 1920 passport application

Biographical details
- Born: September 26, 1886; Viroqua, Wisconsin, U.S.
- Died: May 3, 1979 (aged 92); Fairfield, Connecticut, U.S.

Playing career
- 1908–1910: Yale
- Positions: Fullback, halfback

Coaching career (HC unless noted)
- 1911: Yale

Head coaching record
- Overall: 7–2–1

Accomplishments and honors

Awards
- Second-team All-American (1910)

John W. Field (September 26, 1886 – May 3, 1979) was an American football player and coach. Field played college football for Yale University from 1908 to 1910 and was captain of Yale's football team. He also served as the head coach of the 1911 Yale football team. He later worked for more than 60 years as manufacturer of corsets and lingerie.

== Early years ==
Field was born in Viroqua, Wisconsin, in 1886. His father, Walter S. Field (born October 1856), was a Wisconsin native and an attorney. His mother, Emma (Tourjee) Field (born October 1858), was also a Wisconsin native. He moved with his family to Oklahoma as a boy. At the time of the 1900 United States census, Field was living with his parents and three sisters (Eva, Ruth and Luella) in Washington, D.C.. His father was employed at that time as an attorney. Field attended high school at the local high school in Washington, D.C.

== Yale ==
Field enrolled at Yale University. He played for Yale's freshman football team in 1907 and then at the halfback and fullback positions for the Yale Bulldogs football team from to 1908 to 1910. During his three years as a player, the Yale football team compiled an overall record of 23–3–3, and has been recognized as national champions in 1909.

After graduating from Yale in 1911, Field was hired to stay on at Yale as the head football coach. Field coached the 1911 Yale football team to a 7–2–1 record, outscoring opponents 191 to 16. Field continued to serve the Yale football team as an assistant coach in several subsequent seasons.

During the period from 1899 to 1912, Yale had 14 different head football coaches in 14 years – despite compiling a combined record of 127–11–10 in those years. During that 14-year span, the Yale football team has also been recognized as the national championship team by one or more of the major national championship selectors on seven occasions – 1900 (Billingsley, Helms, Houlgate, National Championship Foundation, Parke Davis), 1901 (Parke Davis), 1902 (Parke Davis), 1905 (Parke Davis, Whitney), 1906 (Billingsley, Parke Davis, Whitney), 1907 (Billingsley, Helms, Houlgate, National Championship Foundation, Parke Davis, Whitney), and 1909 (Billingsley, Helms, Houlgate, National Championship Foundation, Parke Davis).

== Business career and family ==
Field was married to Margaret Lucetta Warner (born October 15, 1891), the daughter of corset manufacturer, DeVer Warner.

Field began working in his father-in-law's corset manufacturing business in approximately 1910. In a draft registration card completed in June 1917, Field stated that he was living in Bridgeport, Connecticut, and working as the general superintendent of Warner Bros. Co.

By 1920, Field was the manager of the corset department of The Warner Brothers Company in Bridgeport. At the time of the 1920 United States census, Field was living in Fairfield, Connecticut, with his wife, Margaret Warner Field and their three children – John W. Field (1914–2005), William Field (age 2-1/2), and Jean Field (age 6 months). They also had two live-in maids and one live-in cook. His occupation was listed as a manufacturer of corsets.

In December 1920, Field traveled to Europe to establish a branch of the business in Brussels, Belgium.

At the time of the 1930 United States census, Field was living in Fairfield, Connecticut, with his wife Margaret Warner Field, their children, John W. Field and Jean Field, and three live-in servants. Field's occupation was listed as the president for a factory.

Field's father-in-law died in 1934, and Field took over as chief executive officer of The Warner Brothers Company. Under Field's leadership, the company revamped its product line with new products, including the "Two-Way-One-Way" girdle, "an elastic undergarment that wrapped around the body and flattened the hips yet still allowed full body movement." In a draft registration card completed at the time of World War II, Field indicated that he was living with his wife at 1514 Hillside Road in Fairfield, Connecticut, and that he was employed by The Warner Brothers Company in Bridgeport.

In 1947, as the post-war economy boomed, the company's revenues topped $12 million with profits of $1 million. The company prospered through the 1950s with the Warner brand lines of bras, girdles, and "corselettes." By 1956, sales had risen to more than $25 million. In 1957, Field's son, John Warner Field, persuaded the company's board of directors to oust his 73-year-old father, and the younger Field took over as chief executive officer.

Field remained active with the company as the chairman of its board of directors from 1957 to 1973. The company became publicly traded in 1961 and changed its name to Warnaco Inc. During the 1960s, the company acquired several other apparel companies, including the Hathaway, Lady Hathaway, Puritan and Thane brands. In 1968, the company achieved sales of $185 and profits of $77 million. The company evolved from a manufacturer of corsets and brassieres to a leading manufacturer of wide range lingerie, intimate apparel, and sports apparel. In 1969, the company also began to manufacture panty hose and stretch hosiery. When Field retired as chairman in 1973, his son, John W. Field, took over as chairman. His son, John W. Field, took over as the company's president in 1957 and continued to serve in that capacity until 1979. The company today is known as the Warnaco Group and is the producer of a wide range of intimate apparel, sportswear, and swimwear, including the brand names Calvin Klein, Speedo, Chaps, Warner's, and Olga.

Field's wife, Margaret Warner Field, died in November 1973 at their home on Hillside Road in Fairfield. Field died six years later in 1979 at a hospital in Fairfield, Connecticut.

== Head coaching record ==
Year	Team	Overall	Conference	Standing	Bowl/playoffs
Yale Bulldogs (Independent) (1911)
1911	Yale	7–2–1			
Yale:		7–2–1			
Total:		7–2–1			
