= Leroy Mercer =

American athlete and surgeon (1888–1957)

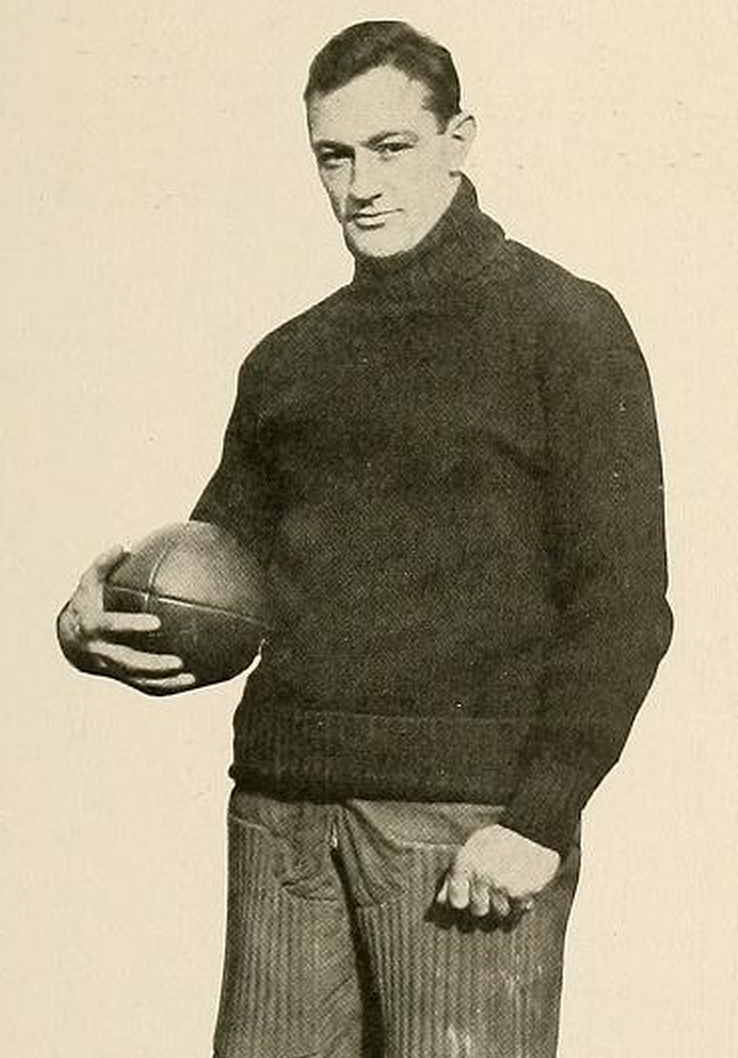
- Mercer pictured in Halcyon 1918, Swarthmore yearbook

Biographical details
- Born: October 30, 1888; Kennett Square, Pennsylvania, U.S.
- Died: July 3, 1957 (aged 68); Swarthmore, Pennsylvania, U.S.

Playing career
- 1910–1912: Penn
- Position: Fullback

Coaching career (HC unless noted)
- 1917–1930: Swarthmore

Head coaching record
- Overall: 63–41–7

Accomplishments and honors

Awards
- 2× Consensus All-American (1910, 1912); Third-team All-American (1911); Penn Athletics Hall of Fame
- College Football Hall of Fame; Inducted in 1955 (profile)

Eugene Leroy Mercer (October 30, 1888 – July 3, 1957) was a respected surgeon but was best known for his college football career while attending the University of Pennsylvania. In 1910, he led Penn to the eastern championship and served as the Quakers' captain for the next two seasons. During his time at Penn, Mercer helped the Quakers to a 23–10 football record and received All-American honors in 1910, 1911 and 1912.

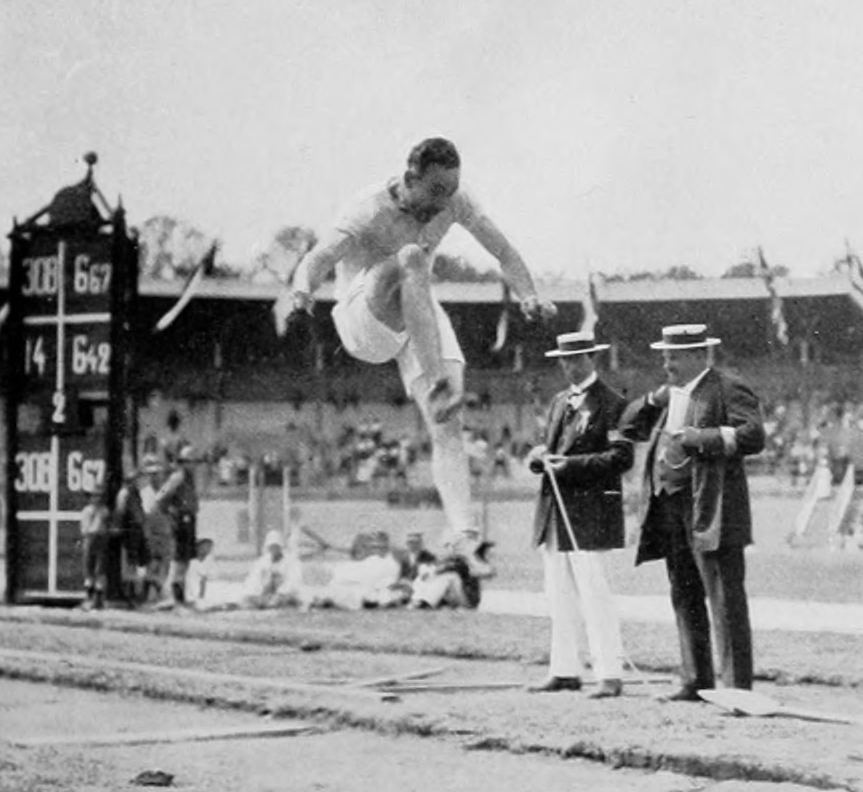
Mercer performing a long jump in the Olympics

In 1908, Mercer cleared 12-foot (3.7 m) in the pole vault, setting a record which he then broke in 1909. He is credited with becoming the only high school athlete to clear that height with a now-outdated spruce pole. Mercer was named to the United States Olympic team for the 1912 Olympic Games and placed fifth in the long jump and sixth in the decathlon. He also competed in baseball, which was a demonstration sport at those Games. Mercer then captained Penn's 1913 champion track team and received All-American honors for his long jump accomplishments, and he won the IC4A long jump titles in 1912 and 1913.

He received his Doctorate in Medicine in 1913 and launched a distinguished career as a physician and educator. He later worked at Swarthmore College as the school's athletic director and as a physical education professor. He also coached the school's lacrosse team in 1918 and 1919.

Mercer returned to Penn in 1930 to serve as the director and dean of the school's Physical Education Department. In 1955, he was elected to the College Football Hall of Fame.

== Head coaching record ==
Year	Team	Overall	Conference	Standing	Bowl/playoffs
Swarthmore Quakers / Garnet Tide (Independent) (1917–1930)
1917	Swarthmore	6–2			
1918	Swarthmore	4–2			
1919	Swarthmore	7–1			
1920	Swarthmore	4–3–1			
1921	Swarthmore	4–2–2			
1922	Swarthmore	3–5			
1923	Swarthmore	5–2–1			
1924	Swarthmore	4–3–1			
1925	Swarthmore	4–3			
1926	Swarthmore	5–3			
1927	Swarthmore	4–3–1			
1928	Swarthmore	6–2			
1929	Swarthmore	6–3			
1930	Swarthmore	1–7–1			
Swarthmore:		63–41–7			
Total:		63–41–7			
