= Sam Dolan =

American football player and coach (1884–1944)

- Dolan in 1912

Biographical details
- Born: August 14, 1884; Folkestone, England
- Died: December 30, 1944 (aged 60); Bend, Oregon, U.S.

Playing career
- 1903–1904: Albany College (OR)
- 1905: Oregon Agricultural
- 1906–1909: Notre Dame
- Position: Guard

Coaching career (HC unless noted)
- 1911–1912: Oregon Agricultural

Head coaching record
- Overall: 8–6

Accomplishments and honors

Awards
- First-team All-Western (1909)

Samuel Michael Patrick "Rosy" Dolan (August 14, 1884 – December 30, 1944) was an American college football player, coach, and referee. He played collegiately for the University of Notre Dame and coached for two seasons at Oregon Agricultural College (today's Oregon State University).

After leaving the coaching profession, Dolan became a football official, gaining a reputation for competence and fairness over a period of two decades.

== Biography ==
=== Early years ===
Dolan was born August 14, 1884, in Folkestone, England of Irish parentage. He came to the United States with his family when he was about six, moving to Portland, Oregon, where he attended the Josiah Failing School in the south part of the city.

=== Playing career ===
Dolan began his collegiate football career as a student at Albany College (today's Lewis & Clark College) in Albany, Oregon.

In 1905, Dolan attended Oregon Agricultural College in neighboring Corvallis, Oregon, starting on the school's football team as a tackle.

Dolan played football at Notre Dame from 1906 to 1909. While at Notre Dame, Dolan was a starter at right guard. In his four seasons as a player, the Fighting Irish were 27–2–2.

Dolan also attended school at Oregon Agricultural College in 1909, however did not play football for OAC.

=== Coaching career ===
In 1911, Dolan became the head football coach at Oregon State. During that 1911 season, OAC did not play their in state rivals, the University of Oregon in an annual rivalry game due to a riot at the game previous year. The OAC student body decided to cancel all athletic events between the two schools for the 1911 season.

The game was brought back for the 1912 season but was moved to a neutral site in Albany, Oregon. The neutral field idea came from an Albany cigar-maker named Billy Eagles, Dolan's brother-in-law.

Dolan served as the head coach for two seasons, posting an 8–6 overall record.

=== Life after coaching ===
Dolan married the former Arlene Train, daughter of a former postmaster of Albany and publisher of the Albany Herald.

Dolan (middle row, far right) with the 1912 OAC Aggies football team.

Dolan made his career as a professor of civil engineering at Oregon State College. In addition to an academic career spanning three decades, Dolan worked as a practicing engineer in the field, taking a leave of absence in 1934 to work for the Oregon State Highway Commission as senior engineering inspector of the Coos Bay Bridge and serving as an engineering examiner in Portland until 1936.

After his time as a head coach, Dolan became a prominent referee in the Pacific Coast Conference, working in important games for a period of twenty years. "He was known as one of the best officials, keeping complete control of the game but exercising his powers impartially," the Albany Democrat-Herald recalled in a memorial editorial published at the time of his death.

Dolan frequently worked important contests as a referee, including the "Big Game" between Stanford University and the University of California and the Rose Bowl Game. He retired from officiating in about 1939.

=== Death and legacy ===
Dolan died December 30, 1944, at his home in Bend, Oregon, from complications resulting from influenza and heart disease. He was 60 years old at the time of his death.

At the time of his death Dolan was eulogized with an editorial in The Oregonian, the largest-circulation newspaper in the state, which lauded Dolan's "thirty-five years of association with the college, his faithfulness, and unflagging support":

"Samuel Michael Patrick Dolan and the late Dr. [J.R.N.] Bell, stout and enthusiastic Presbyterian minister for whom Bell Field was named, were two men whose interest never faltered and who left their impress upon generations of college students by their character even more than by their works. If Oregon State ever has another field to name it should be for Sam Dolan. He played the game hard and fair and he loved it."

After services at St. Mary's Catholic Church in Corvallis, Dolan's body was laid to rest at Riverside Cemetery in Albany.

== Head coaching record ==
Year	Team	Overall	Conference	Standing	Bowl/playoffs
Oregon Agricultural Aggies (Northwest Conference) (1911–1912)
1911	Oregon Agricultural	5–2	2–1	T–2nd	
1912	Oregon Agricultural	3–4	1–3	6th	
Oregon Agricultural:		8–6	3–4		
Total:		8–6			
