= Robert McKay (American football) =

American football player and investment banker (1887–1958)

- McKay, circa 1910

Profile
- Position: Tackle

Personal information
- Born: May 3, 1887; Frankfort, Maine, or Paris, France
- Died: November 26, 1958 (aged 71); Muttontown, New York, U.S.

Career information
- College: Harvard (1908–1910)

Awards and highlights
- National champion (1910); Consensus All-American (1910); Second-team All-American (1909)

Robert Gordon McKay (May 3, 1887 – November 26, 1958) was an American football player and investment banker. He played college football for the Harvard Crimson from 1908 to 1910 and was selected as a consensus All-American football player in 1908 and 1910. He later became an investment banker in New York.

== Early life ==
McKay was born in 1887 in either Frankfort, Maine, or Paris, France. He was the son of Gordon McKay and Baroness Marion Treat von Bruning. He attended preparatory school at the Phillips Academy, before enrolling at Harvard College.

== Harvard ==
McKay played college football at the tackle position for the Harvard Crimson football team from 1908 to 1910. In 1908, he was selected as an All-American by The Christian Science Monitor. In 1909, he was selected as a second-team All-American by Walter Camp, and in 1910, he was selected as a first-team All-American by Camp. He also played for the Harvard Crimson baseball team as a pitcher.

== Later life ==
After graduating from Harvard in 1911, McKay moved to Seattle and then operated a sheep ranch in Montana. During World War I, he was commander of the 305th Infantry Machine Gun Company (nicknamed "Death") of New York's 77th Division. After the war, he worked as an investment banker before retiring in 1937. McKay was associated for a time with the North American Company. He also served in the military during World War II, reaching the rank of colonel.

McKay was married twice. In August 1923, he was married at Garrison, New York, to Virginia Osborn Sanger, the daughter of Henry Fairfield Osborn, president of the American Museum of Natural History. His first wife died in 1955. In January 1957, McKay was married to Alexandra Emery Moore of Muttontown, New York, in a ceremony at the bride's winter home near Monticello, Florida. McKay died at his home in Syosset, New York in November 1958 at age 71.
