= Dave Allerdice =

American footballer and coach (1887–1941)

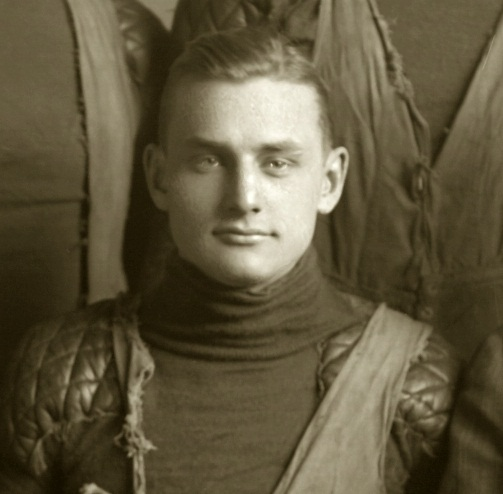
- Allerdice, 1909

Biographical details
- Born: March 26, 1887; Indianapolis, Indiana, U.S.
- Died: January 10, 1941 (aged 53); Indianapolis, Indiana, U.S.

Playing career
- 1907–1909: Michigan
- Position: Halfback

Coaching career (HC unless noted)
- 1910: Michigan (assistant)
- 1911: Butler
- 1911–1915: Texas

Head coaching record
- Overall: 36–11–1

Accomplishments and honors

Awards
- Second-team All-American (1909); First-team All-Western (1909)

David Way Allerdice (March 26, 1887 – January 10, 1941) was an American football player and coach. He played college football as the University of Michigan as a halfback from 1907 to 1909. Allerdice served as the head football coach at Butler University in 1911 and the University of Texas at Austin from 1911 to 1915. He left Butler after the team's first game in early October to move to Texas, succeeding his former Michigan teammate Billy Wasmund, who had died from a fall.

== Early life and playing career ==
Allerdice was born in Indianapolis, Indiana in 1887. He enrolled at the University of Michigan and played at the right halfback position for coach Fielding H. Yost's Michigan Wolverines football teams from 1907 to 1909. Allerdice played on offense and defense for Michigan, and he also handled place-kicking and punting responsibilities. He was Michigan's leading scorer in 1908 with 64 points in seven games, and again in 1909 with 51 points in seven games. In 1908, he scored all of Michigan's points a 12–6 win over Notre Dame and a 10–6 win over Ohio State. He scored a career-high 19 points (two touchdowns, six extra points, and a field goal) in a 1909 victory over Syracuse. Allerdice won praise from the press for playing through injuries, playing the 1908 Penn game with a broken collarbone and the 1909 Penn game with a broken hand.

Allerdice served as captain of the 1909 Michigan football team that compiled a record of 6–1, outscored opponents 116 to 34, and held six of seven opponents to six points or less. At the end of the 1909 season, he was selected as a first-team All-American by The New York Times and syndicated sports writer, Tommy Clark. He was a second-team pick on Walter Camp's 1909 College Football All-America Team. Walter Eckersall also picked Allerdice as a first-team halfback on his 1909 All-Western team.

== Coaching career ==
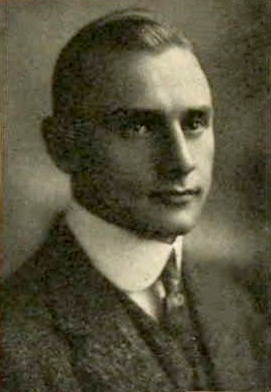
Allerdice, c. 1913

After one year as an assistant coach to Yost in 1910, Allerdice became head coach at Butler University in his hometown of Indianapolis, Indiana, but left for the University of Texas to assume the head coaching position there after Billy Wasmund suddenly died in October 1911.

At age 25, Allerdice was the 2nd-youngest coach in Texas football history (behind his predecessor, Billy Wasmund, who died at age 23). Allerdice's Longhorns finished 5–2 in 1911, 7–1 in both the 1912 and 1913 seasons, and went unbeaten at 8–0 in 1914. In the inaugural Southwest Conference season in 1915, Texas finished 6–3 with losses to Oklahoma, Texas A&M, and Notre Dame. At season's end, despite a career record of 33–7 with the Longhorns, Allerdice informed the Athletic Council of his resignation because of the "super critical nature of the Texas fans."

== Later life, family, and death ==
Allerdice was married in October 1916 to Cornelia Simrall Keasbey, in Austin, Texas. He returned to Indianapolis and went into his family's meat packing business. In a draft registration card completed in June 1917, Allerdice indicated that he was working as cattle buyer in Indianapolis. At the time of the 1920 Census, Allerdice and his wife were listed as residents of Indianapolis along with their son, David W. Allerdice Jr., age one. In 1930, Allerdice continued to be a resident of Indianapolis along with his wife, Cornelia, and sons David (age 11) and John (age 8). A third son, Anthony, was born in 1933.

On January 5, 1941, a fire broke out at Allerdice's home at 3617 Washington Boulevard in Indianapolis. Allerdice's wife, Cornelia, and youngest son, Anthony, died in the fire from suffocation. Allerdice and his eldest son, Dave Jr., suffered severe burns. Allerdice was taken to Methodist Hospital, where he died on January 10.

== Honors ==
Allerdice was posthumously inducted into the Longhorn Hall of Honor in 1981.

== Head coaching record ==
Year	Team	Overall	Conference	Standing	Bowl/playoffs
Butler Christians (Independent) (1911)
1911	Butler	3–4–1 (Note: Allerdice left Butler after the team's first game in early October to become the head football coach at University of Texas at Austin, succeeding Billy Wasmund, who died as a result of a fall. Walter Gipe coached Butler for the remainder of the season. Butler credits the entire season to Allerdice.)			
Butler:		3–4–1			
Texas Longhorns (Independent) (1911–1914)
1911	Texas	5–2			
1912	Texas	7–1			
1913	Texas	7–1			
1914	Texas	8–0			
Texas Longhorns (Southwest Conference) (1915)
1915	Texas	6–3	2–2	T–3rd	
Texas:		33–7	2–2		
Total:		36–11–1			
