= Wilton S. Farnsworth =

Sportswriter and editor

- Born: June 7, 1885; Millbury, Massachusetts, U.S.
- Died: July 10, 1945 (aged 60); New York, New York, U.S.
- Occupation(s): Sportswriter, editor, and boxing promoter

Wilton Simpson "Bill" Farnsworth (June 7, 1885 – July 10, 1945) was an American sports writer, editor, and boxing promoter. He worked for William Randolph Hearst's newspapers from 1904 to 1937. He was the sports editor of Hearst's New York Evening Journal (evening) or New York American (morning) from 1914 to 1937. He also worked for shorter stints on Hearst's Boston American (1904–1907) and Atlanta Georgian (1912–1914). From 1937 to 1944, he was a boxing promoter in partnership with Mike Jacobs.

== Early years ==
Farnsworth was born in 1885 in Millbury, Massachusetts. At the time of the 1900 United States census, Farnsworth was living with his parents, Wilton Grafton Farnsworth and Annie (Simpson) Farnsworth in Millbury. His father's occupation was listed as a "landlord."

== Reporting and editorial career ==
Farnsworth began his career as a journalist working for the Evening Gazette in Worcester, Massachusetts. In 1904, he was hired by the Boston American, a newly formed newspaper that was part of William Randolph Hearst's chain of newspapers.

In 1907, Farnwsworth moved to New York to work for Hearst's New York Evening Journal . In October 1908, Farnsworth established himself when he exposed a plot to bribe umpire Bill Klem in connection with a playoff game between the New York Giants and Chicago Cubs. He spent three months covering the story.

In 1912, Farnsworth was transferred to Atlanta as the sports editor of the Atlanta Georgian after it was acquired by Hearst. He returned to New York in 1914 as the sports editor of Hearst's morning newspaper, the New York American. He also covered the New York Yankees after returning from Atlanta to New York. By the early 1920s, Farnsworth had moved from the American back to Hearst's evening newspaper, The New York Evening Journal, as sports editor. In 1922, Farnsworth hired Ford Frick as a baseball writer.

Farnsworth later returned to the New York Evening Journal, serving as its sports editor for many years, and continued to hold that position after Hearst's morning and evening papers merged to become the New York Journal-American. Farnsworth continued to write during his time as an editor, and his column was published under the title "Sidewalks of New York."

Farnsworth was a friend of New York Yankees' owner Jacob Ruppert and once negotiated a contract renewal with Babe Ruth on behalf of the Yankees.

== Boxing promoter ==
Starting in 1923, Farnsworth teamed with Damon Runyon in promoting boxing bouts which raised more than $1 million for Hearst's Free Milk Fund for Babies. When Madison Square Garden refused to give a larger cut of the gate to the Milk Fund, Farnsworth wrote articles criticizing the refusal and negotiated leases with the city's baseball stadiums to host future fights.

In 1937, Farnsworth teamed up with boxing promoter Mike Jacobs and Damon Runyon to establish the Twentieth Century Sporting Club, a boxing promotion organization formed to compete with Madison Square Garden. Farnsworth served as the vice president and general manager of the organization.

== Family and death ==
Farnsworth was married to Millicent de Freytas of Brookline, Massachusetts. At the time of the 1910 United States census, Farnsworth was living in Manhattan with his wife Millicent and their two children, Marjorie and Wilton. His occupation was listed as the editor of a newspaper. In a draft registration card completed in September 1918, Farnsworth indicated that he was employed by W.R. Hearst as an editor in New York. At the time of the 1920 United States census, Farnsworth was living in Queens with his wife and two children. His occupation was again listed as a newspaper editor.

Farnsworth suffered a stroke while attending a boxing match at Madison Square Garden on November 10, 1944. He remained hospitalized at St. Clare's Hospital in New York where he died in July 1945. A requiem mass was held for Farnsworth at St. Vincent Ferrer Church in Manhattan. The honorary pallbearers as his funeral included his longtime friend Damon Runyon, New York Mayor Jimmy Walker, boxing promoter Mike Jacobs, Pulitzer Prize winner Max Kase, boxing historian Nat Fleischer, and humorist Bugs Baer.

His son Wilton M. Farnsworth was also a sportswriter for the New York Journal-American.
