= 1910 in Michigan =

- Decades: 1890s; 1900s; 1910s; 1920s; 1930s
- See also: History of Michigan; Historical outline of Michigan; List of years in Michigan; 1910 in the United States

Events from the year 1910 in Michigan.

== Office holders ==
=== State office holders ===
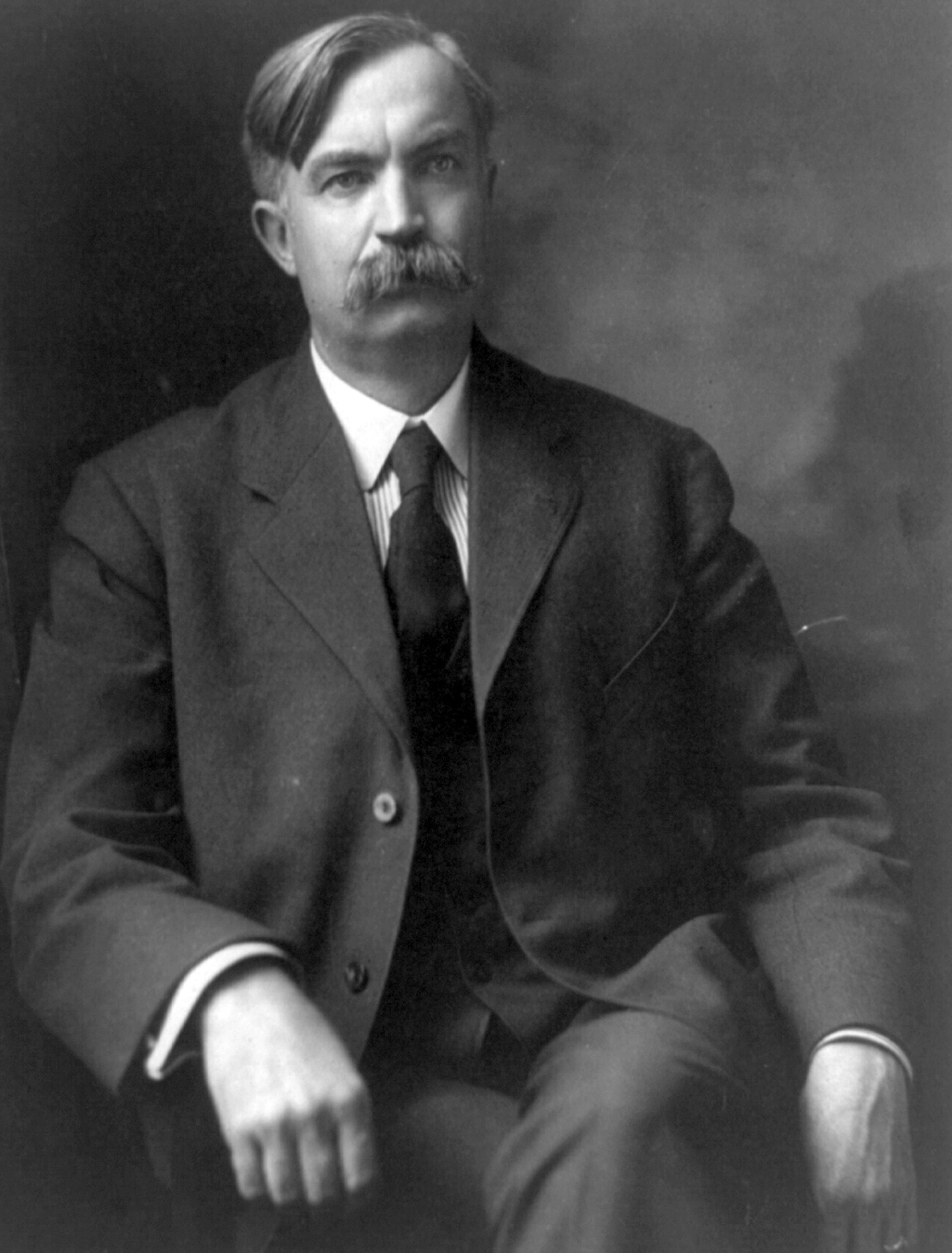
Gov. Fred M. Warner

- Governor of Michigan: Fred M. Warner (Republican)
- Lieutenant Governor of Michigan: Patrick H. Kelley (Republican)
- Michigan Attorney General: Franz C. Kuhn
- Michigan Secretary of State: Frederick C. Martindale (Republican)
- State Land Commissioner: Huntley Russell (Republican)
- Speaker of the Michigan House of Representatives: Colin P. Campbell (Republican)
- Chief Justice, Michigan Supreme Court: John E. Bird

=== Mayors of major cities ===
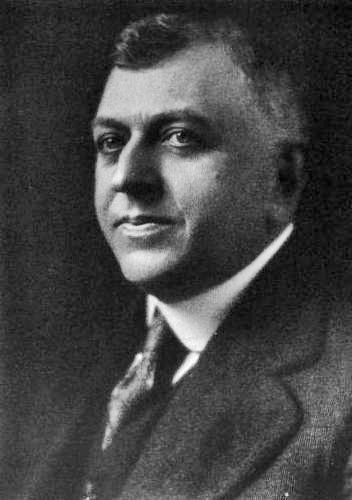
Detroit Mayor Philip Breitmeyer

- Mayor of Detroit: Philip Breitmeyer
- Mayor of Grand Rapids: George E. Ellis
- Mayor of Flint: Guy W. Selby
- Mayor of Lansing: Benjamin A. Kyes
- Mayor of Saginaw: George W. Stewart, M.D.
- Mayor of Ann Arbor: Ernst M. Wurster

=== Federal office holders ===
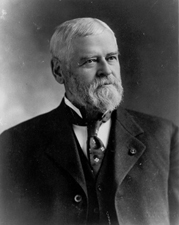
U.S. Sen. Julius C. Burrows

- U.S. Senator from Michigan: Julius C. Burrows (Republican)
- U.S. Senator from Michigan: William Alden Smith (Republican)
- House District 1: Edwin Denby (Republican)
- House District 2: Charles E. Townsend (Republican)
- House District 3: Washington Gardner (Republican)
- House District 4: Edward L. Hamilton (Republican)
- House District 5: Gerrit J. Diekema (Republican)
- House District 6: Samuel William Smith (Republican)
- House District 7: Henry McMorran (Republican)
- House District 8: Joseph W. Fordney (Republican)
- House District 9: James C. McLaughlin (Republican)
- House District 10: George A. Loud (Republican)
- House District 11: Francis H. Dodds (Republican)
- House District 12: H. Olin Young (Republican)

== Population ==
In the 1910 United States census, Michigan was recorded as having a population of 2,810,173, ranking as the ninth most populous state in the country. By 1920, Michigan's population had increased by 30.5% to 3,668,412.

=== Cities ===
The following is a list of cities in Michigan with a population of at least 10,000 based on 1910 U.S. Census data. Historic census data from 1900 and 1920 is included to reflect trends in population increases or decreases. In recent decades, all of the state's most populous cities lie in the southern half of the lower peninsula. In 1910, owing largely to an economy based on extraction of natural resources, eight of the state's most populous cities were located north of 44° latitude; in the chart below, these cities are shaded in aqua.

1910 Rank	City	County	1900 Pop.	1910 Pop.	1920 Pop.	Change 1910-20
1	Detroit	Wayne	285,704	465,766	993,678	113.3%
2	Grand Rapids	Kent	87,565	112,571	137,634	22.3%
3	Saginaw	Saginaw	42,345	50,510	61,903	22.6%
4	Bay City	Bay	27,628	45,166	47,554	5.3%
5	Kalamazoo	Kalamazoo	24,404	39,437	48,487	22.9%
6	Flint	Genesee	13,103	38,550	91,599	137.6%
7	Jackson	Jackson	25,180	31,433	48,374	53.9%
8	Lansing	Ingham	16,485	31,229	57,327	83.6%
9	Battle Creek	Calhoun	18,563	25,267	36,164	43.1%
10	Muskegon	Muskegon	20,818	24,062	36,570	52.0%
11	Port Huron	St. Clair	19,158	18,863	25,944	37.5%
12	Ann Arbor	Washtenaw	14,509	14,817	19,516	31.7%
13	Pontiac	Oakland	9,769	14,532	34,273	135.8%
14	Escanaba	Delta	9,549	13,194	13,103	−0.7%
15	Ironwood	Gogebic	9,705	12,821	15,739	22.8%
16	Alpena	Alpena	11,802	12,706	11,101	−12.6%
17	Sault Ste. Marie	Chippewa	10,538	12,615	12,096	−4.1%
18	Manistee	Manistee	14,260	12,381	9,694	−21.7%
19	Traverse City	Grand Traverse	9,407	12,115	10,925	−9.8%
20	Marquette	Marquette	10,058	11,503	12,718	10.6%
21	Adrian	Lenawee	9,654	10,763	11,878	10.4%
22	Menominee	Menominee	12,818	10,507	8,907	−15.2%
23	Holland	Ottawa	7,790	10,490	12,183	16.1%

=== Boom cities of the 1910s ===
The 1910s saw an explosion of growth in the population of small cities near Detroit. Highland Park and Hamtramck were the most extreme cases, each experiencing population increases in excess of 1,000% during the 1910s.

1910 Rank	City	County	1900 Pop.	1910 Pop.	1920 Pop.	Change 1920-30
	Highland Park	Wayne	427	4,120	46,499	1,028.6%
	Hamtramck	Wayne	--	3,559	48,615	1,266%

=== Counties ===
The following is a list of counties in Michigan with populations of at least 50,000 based on 1910 U.S. Census data. Historic census data from 1900 and 1920 are included to reflect trends in population increases or decreases.

1910 Rank	County	Largest city	1900 Pop.	1910 Pop.	1920 Pop.	Change 1910-20
1	Wayne	Detroit	348,793	531,591	1,177,645	121.5%
2	Kent	Grand Rapids	129,714	159,145	183,041	15.0%
3	Saginaw	Saginaw	81,222	89,290	100,286	12.3%
4	Houghton	Houghton	66,063	88,098	71,930	−18.4%
5	Bay	Bay City	62,378	68,238	69,548	1.9%
6	Genesee	Flint	41,804	64,555	125,668	94.7%
7	Kalamazoo	Kalamazoo	44,310	60,327	71,225	18.1%
8	Calhoun	Battle Creek	49,315	56,638	72,918	28.7%
9	Berrien	Niles	49,165	53,622	62,653	16.8%
10	Jackson	Jackson	48,222	53,426	72,539	35.8%
11	Ingham	Lansing	39,818	53,310	81,554	53.0%
12	St. Clair	Port Huron	55,228	52,341	58,009	10.8%
13	Oakland	Pontiac	44,792	49,576	90,050	81.6%
14	Lenawee	Adrian	48,406	47,907	47,767	−0.3%
15	Marquette	Marquette	41,239	46,739	45,786	−2.0%
16	Ottawa	Holland	39,667	45,301	47,660	5.2%
17	Washtenaw	Ann Arbor	47,761	44,714	49,520	10.7%
18	Muskegon	Muskegon	37,036	40,577	62,362	53.7%
19	Allegan	Holland	38,812	39,819	37,540	−5.7%

== Sports ==
=== Baseball ===
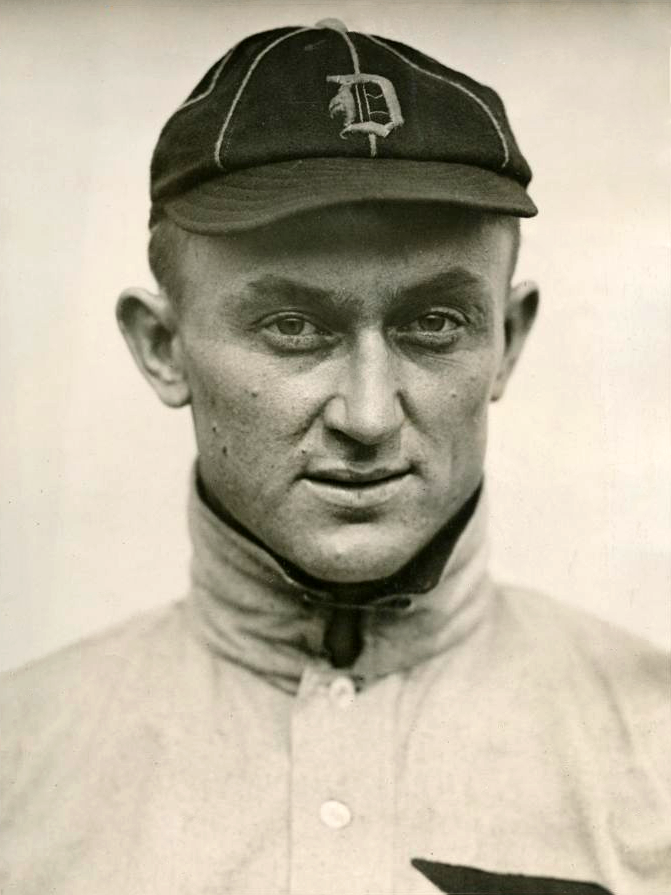
Ty Cobb

- 1910 Detroit Tigers season – After winning three consecutive American League pennants from 1907 to 1909, the Tigers finished third in the American League with a record of 86–68 under manager Hughie Jennings. Outfielder Ty Cobb won his fourth consecutive batting title with an average of .383 and also led the American League in runs scored with 106. George Mullin led the pitching staff with 21 wins, and Ed Willett led with a 2.37 earned run average.
- 1910 Michigan Wolverines baseball season - Under head coach Branch Rickey, the Wolverines compiled a 17–8 record. Clarence Enzenroth was the team captain.

=== American football ===
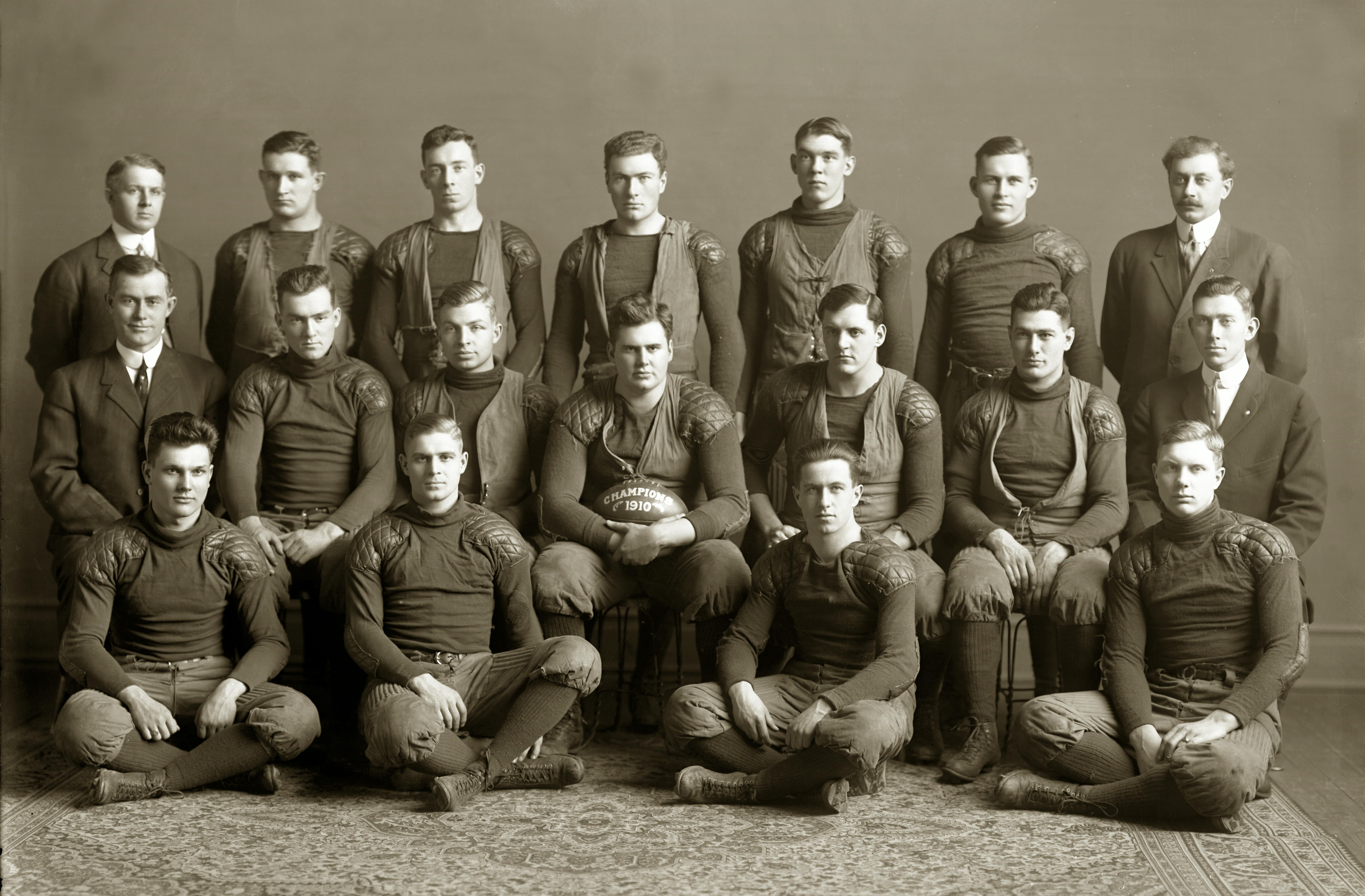
1910 Michigan Wolverines football team

- 1910 Michigan Wolverines football team – Under head coach Fielding H. Yost, Michigan compiled a 3–0–3 record and outscored opponents 29 to 9. Left guard and team captain Albert Benbrook was selected as a consensus first-team All-American for the second consecutive year.
- 1910 Michigan Agricultural Aggies football team – Under head coach Chester Brewer, the Aggies compiled a 6–1 record and outscored their opponents 168 to 8.
- 1910 Central Michigan Normalites football team - Under head coach Harry Helmer, the Central Michigan football team compiled a 6–1–1 record, shut out five of eight opponents, and outscored all opponents by a combined total of 112 to 33.
- 1910 Western State Hilltoppers football team - Under head coach William H. Spaulding, the Hilltoppers compiled a 4–1–1 record and outscored their opponents, 75 to 20.
- 1910 Michigan State Normal Normalites football team – Under head coach Curry Hicks, the Normalites compiled a record of 0–5–1.
- 1910 Detroit College football team – Under head coach George A. Kelly, the team compiled a 3–2 record, but was outscored by its opponents by a combined total of 67 to 28.

== Births ==
- January 1 - Seth Lover, designer of amplifiers who the humbucker or hum-cancelling electric stringed instrument pickup, in Kalamazoo
- January 26 - William C. Lawe, United States Navy sailor who was awarded the Distinguished Flying Cross and Purple Heart for his role in the Battle of Midway during World War II, in Carson City, Michigan
- February 12 - Jay Leyda, avant-garde filmmaker and film historian, noted for his work on U.S., Soviet, and Chinese cinema, in Detroit
- February 27 - Kelly Johnson, aeronautical and systems engineer who was a team leader of the Lockheed Skunk Works whose contributions included the Lockheed U-2, SR-71 Blackbird, the first production aircraft to exceed Mach 3, and the first fighter capable of Mach 2, in Ishpeming, Michigan
- March 12 - Roger L. Stevens, theatrical producer and founding Chairman of both the Kennedy Center for the Performing Arts (1961) and National Endowment for the Arts (1965), in Detroit
- April 3 - James Enright, basketball referee who was inducted into the Naismith Memorial Basketball Hall of Fame, in Sodus, Michigan
- April 3 - Curtis Williams Sabrosky, entomologist specializing in chloropidae, in Sturgis, Michigan
- April 5 - Watson Spoelstra, sportswriter for The Detroit News and president of the Baseball Writers' Association of America, in Grand Rapids
- April 28 - Everett Barksdale, jazz guitarist and session musician, in Detroit
- May 14 - Willard J. Smith, thirteenth Commandant of the United States Coast Guard from 1966 to 1970, in Suttons Bay, Michigan
- May 30 - Alvin Andreas Herborg Nielsen, physicist known for his work in molecular spectroscopy, in Menominee, Michigan
- May 30 - Frank S. Besson, Jr., general in U.S. Army and head of the U.S. Army Materiel Command, in Detroit
- June 28 - John D. Kraus, physicist known for his contributions to electromagnetics, radio astronomy, and antenna theory, in Ann Arbor
- July 14 - Virginia Harriett Kline, geologist, stratigrapher, and librarian, in Coleman, Michigan
- November 22 - Mary Jackson, actress (The Waltons, Days of Our Lives) in Milford, Michigan
- December 7 - Clem Sohn, airshow dare-devil who perfected a way of gliding through the air with a home-made wingsuit, in Fowler, Michigan
- December 17 - Sy Oliver, African-American jazz arranger, trumpeter, composer, singer and bandleader, in Battle Creek

== Deaths ==
- March 10 - Ebenezer O. Grosvenor, former Lieutenant Governor and State Treasurer, in Jonesville, Michigan
- March 30 - William Webb Ferguson, first African-American man elected to Michigan House of Representatives
- July 23 - Henry H. Aplin, Congressman, in West Bay City
- August 1 - George L. Maltz, Michigan State Treasurer (1887–1891), at age 67

== See also ==
- History of Michigan
- History of Detroit
