= 1910 Fairmount Wheatshockers football team =

American college football season

1910 Fairmount Wheatshockers football
- Conference: Independent
- Record: 6–2–1
- Head coach: Roy K. Thomas (2nd season)

1910 Midwestern college football independents records
	Conf.			Overall
Team	W	L	T	W		L		T
Wabash		–		4	–	0	–	0
Michigan Agricultural		–		6	–	1	–	0
St. Mary's (OH)		–		5	–	1	–	0
Central Michigan		–		5	–	1	–	1
Marquette		–		6	–	1	–	2
Notre Dame		–		4	–	1	–	1
Buchtel		–		7	–	2	–	0
Saint Louis		–		7	–	2	–	0
Michigan		–		3	–	0	–	3
Fairmount		–		6	–	2	–	1
Lake Forest		–		5	–	2	–	0
Western State Normal		–		4	–	2	–	0
Northern Illinois State		–		4	–	2	–	1
Mount Union		–		4	–	2	–	2
South Dakota State		–		4	–	2	–	2
Detroit College		–		3	–	2	–	0
Doane		–		3	–	2	–	1
Butler		–		4	–	3	–	1
Rose Poly		–		4	–	4	–	0
North Dakota Agricultural		–		2	–	3	–	0
Miami (OH)		–		2	–	4	–	1
Carthage		–		2	–	4	–	0
Ohio Northern		–		2	–	5	–	0
Iowa State Teachers		–		1	–	4	–	1
Haskell		–		2	–	7	–	0
Heidelberg		–		1	–	7	–	0
Michigan State Normal		–		0	–	5	–	1
Ohio		–		0	–	6	–	1

The 1910 Fairmount Wheatshockers football team was an American football team that represented Fairmount College (now known as Wichita State University) as an independent during the 1910 college football season. In its second season under head coach Roy K. Thomas, the team compiled a 6–2–1 record and shut out five of nine opponents.

== Schedule ==
Date	Opponent	Site	Result	Source
October 1	Cooper	Wichita, KS	W 31–0	
October 8	College of Emporia	Wichita, KS	W 29–0	
October 15	at Kansas State Normal	Emporia, KS	L 11–12	
October 20	Alva Normal	Wichita, KS	W 28–0	
October 28	Oklahoma Christian	Wichita, KS	W 11–6	
November 5	Haskell	Wichita, KS	W 35–0	
November 12	at Kansas State	Manhattan, KS	L 6–33	
November 19	Southwestern (KS)	Wichita, KS	T 0–0	
November 24	Baker	Wichita, KS	W 12–6	
