= Bill Caldwell (American football) =

American football player and coach

Playing career
- 1907–1909: Kansas
- Positions: Tackle, end

Coaching career (HC unless noted)
- 1910: Haskell
- 1911: Muskingum

Head coaching record
- Overall: 2–13

William Caldwell was an American football player and coach. He served as the head football coach at Haskell Institute—now known as Haskell Indian Nations University—in Lawrence, Kansas for one season, in 1910, and Muskingum College—now known as Muskingum University in New Concord, Ohio for one season, in 1911, compiling a career college football coaching record of 2–13. Caldwell played college football for three seasons, from 1907 to 1909, at the University of Kansas.

== Playing career ==
Caldwell was a three-time letter winner at the University of Kansas, playing tackle and end.

== Coaching career ==
Caldwell's first coaching job was as the head football coach at Haskell Institute—now known as Haskell Indian Nations University—in Lawrence, Kansas in 1910.

In 1911, he served as the head football coach at Muskingum College—now known as Muskingum University—in New Concord, Ohio.

== Later life ==
In 1914, Caldwell worked as a teacher at West Technical High School in Cleveland, Ohio.

== Head coaching record ==
Year	Team	Overall	Conference	Standing	Bowl/playoffs
Haskell Indians (Independent) (1910)
1910	Haskell	2–7			
Haskell:		2–7			
Muskingum Fighting Muskies (Independent) (1911)
1911	Muskingum	0–6			
Muskingum:		0–6			
Total:		2–13			
