= 1910 Olivet Crimson football team =

American college football season

1910 Olivet Crimson football
- Conference: Michigan Intercollegiate Athletic Association
- Record: 5–3 (3–1 MIAA)
- Head coach: Henry Hall (3rd season)
- Home stadium: Reed Field

The 1910 Olivet Crimson football team represented Olivet College during the 1910 college football season.

== Schedule ==
| Date | Opponent | Site | Result | Source |
|---|---|---|---|---|
| October 1 | Charlotte High School* | Reed Field?; Olivet, MI | W 49–0 | |
| October 8 | at Notre Dame* | Cartier Field; Notre Dame, IN | L 0–48 | |
| October 13 | Detroit College* | Reed Field; Olivet, MI | W 29–5 | |
| October 22 | at Kalamazoo | Kalamazoo, MI | W 69–6 | |
| October 29? | at Hillsdale | Hillsdale, MI | W 12–2 | |
| November 5 | at Alma | Alma, MI | L 3–14 | |
| November 12 | Albion | Reed Field?; Olivet, MI | W 15–3 | |
| November 19 | Michigan Agricultural | Reed Field?; Olivet, MI | L 0–62 | |
*Non-conference game
