= 1910 Northern Illinois State Normal football team =

American college football season

1910 Northern Illinois State Normal football
- Conference: Independent
- Record: 4–2–1
- Head coach: William Wirtz (1st season)
- Home stadium: Glidden Field

1910 Midwestern college football independents records
	Conf.			Overall
Team	W	L	T	W		L		T
Wabash		–		4	–	0	–	0
Michigan Agricultural		–		6	–	1	–	0
St. Mary's (OH)		–		5	–	1	–	0
Central Michigan		–		5	–	1	–	1
Marquette		–		6	–	1	–	2
Notre Dame		–		4	–	1	–	1
Buchtel		–		7	–	2	–	0
Saint Louis		–		7	–	2	–	0
Michigan		–		3	–	0	–	3
Fairmount		–		6	–	2	–	1
Lake Forest		–		5	–	2	–	0
Western State Normal		–		4	–	2	–	0
Northern Illinois State		–		4	–	2	–	1
Mount Union		–		4	–	2	–	2
South Dakota State		–		4	–	2	–	2
Detroit College		–		3	–	2	–	0
Doane		–		3	–	2	–	1
Butler		–		4	–	3	–	1
Rose Poly		–		4	–	4	–	0
North Dakota Agricultural		–		2	–	3	–	0
Miami (OH)		–		2	–	4	–	1
Carthage		–		2	–	4	–	0
Ohio Northern		–		2	–	5	–	0
Iowa State Teachers		–		1	–	4	–	1
Haskell		–		2	–	7	–	0
Heidelberg		–		1	–	7	–	0
Michigan State Normal		–		0	–	5	–	1
Ohio		–		0	–	6	–	1

The 1910 Northern Illinois State Normal football team represented Northern Illinois State Normal College as an independent in the 1910 college football season. They were led by first-year head coach William Wirtz and played their home games at Glidden Field, located on the east end of campus. The team finished the season with a 4–2–1 record.

== Schedule ==
Date	Opponent	Site	Result	Source
September 24	Oregon High School	Glidden Field; DeKalb, IL	W 17–0	
October 1	at Sycamore High School	Turner Field; Sycamore, IL	T 0–0	
October 8	Alumni	Glidden Field; DeKalb, IL	W 25–0	
October 22	Elgin High School	Glidden Field; DeKalb, IL	W 3–0	
October 29	at East Aurora High School	Aurora, IL	L 0–16	
November 5	Sycamore High School	Glidden Field; DeKalb, IL	W 22–0	
November 12	Dixon	Dixon, IL	L 3–23	
