= 1910 South Dakota State football team =

American college football season

1910 South Dakota State football
- Conference: Independent
- Record: 4–2–2
- Head coach: Jason M. Saunderson (3rd season)
- Captain: Erwin Bibby
- Home stadium: Athletic Park

1910 Midwestern college football independents records
	Conf.			Overall
Team	W	L	T	W		L		T
Wabash		–		4	–	0	–	0
Michigan Agricultural		–		6	–	1	–	0
St. Mary's (OH)		–		5	–	1	–	0
Central Michigan		–		5	–	1	–	1
Marquette		–		6	–	1	–	2
Notre Dame		–		4	–	1	–	1
Buchtel		–		7	–	2	–	0
Saint Louis		–		7	–	2	–	0
Michigan		–		3	–	0	–	3
Fairmount		–		6	–	2	–	1
Lake Forest		–		5	–	2	–	0
Western State Normal		–		4	–	2	–	0
Northern Illinois State		–		4	–	2	–	1
Mount Union		–		4	–	2	–	2
South Dakota State		–		4	–	2	–	2
Detroit College		–		3	–	2	–	0
Doane		–		3	–	2	–	1
Butler		–		4	–	3	–	1
Rose Poly		–		4	–	4	–	0
North Dakota Agricultural		–		2	–	3	–	0
Miami (OH)		–		2	–	4	–	1
Carthage		–		2	–	4	–	0
Ohio Northern		–		2	–	5	–	0
Iowa State Teachers		–		1	–	4	–	1
Haskell		–		2	–	7	–	0
Heidelberg		–		1	–	7	–	0
Michigan State Normal		–		0	–	5	–	1
Ohio		–		0	–	6	–	1

The 1910 South Dakota State football team was an American football team that represented South Dakota State College of Agriculture and Mechanic Arts—now known as South Dakota State University—as an independent during the 1910 college football season. In its third and final season under head coach Jason M. Saunderson, the team compiled a 4–2–2 record and outscored opponents by a total of 76 to 64.

== Schedule ==
Date	Opponent	Site	Result	Attendance	Source
October 1	at Northern Normal	Aberdeen, SD	W 17–0		
October 8	Huron	Brookings, SD	W 41–0		
October 14	Yankton	Brookings, SD	W 12–0		
October 21	North Dakota Agricultural	Dacotah Field; Fargo, ND (rivalry)	W 6–3		
October 29	at St. Thomas (MN)	Lexington Park; Saint Paul, MN	L 0–28	1,200	
November 7	South Dakota	Vermillion, SD (rivalry)	L 0–33		
November 15	Dakota Wesleyan	Athletic Park; Brookings, SD	T 0–0		
November 24	at South Dakota Mines	Rapid City, SD	T 0–0	600	
