= 1910 North Dakota Agricultural Aggies football team =

American college football season

1910 North Dakota Agricultural Aggies football
- Conference: Independent
- Record: 2–3
- Head coach: Arthur Rueber (2nd season)
- Captain: Palmer Foss
- Home stadium: Dacotah Field

1910 Midwestern college football independents records
	Conf.			Overall
Team	W	L	T	W		L		T
Wabash		–		4	–	0	–	0
Michigan Agricultural		–		6	–	1	–	0
St. Mary's (OH)		–		5	–	1	–	0
Central Michigan		–		5	–	1	–	1
Marquette		–		6	–	1	–	2
Notre Dame		–		4	–	1	–	1
Buchtel		–		7	–	2	–	0
Saint Louis		–		7	–	2	–	0
Michigan		–		3	–	0	–	3
Fairmount		–		6	–	2	–	1
Lake Forest		–		5	–	2	–	0
Western State Normal		–		4	–	2	–	0
Northern Illinois State		–		4	–	2	–	1
Mount Union		–		4	–	2	–	2
South Dakota State		–		4	–	2	–	2
Detroit College		–		3	–	2	–	0
Doane		–		3	–	2	–	1
Butler		–		4	–	3	–	1
Rose Poly		–		4	–	4	–	0
North Dakota Agricultural		–		2	–	3	–	0
Miami (OH)		–		2	–	4	–	1
Carthage		–		2	–	4	–	0
Ohio Northern		–		2	–	5	–	0
Iowa State Teachers		–		1	–	4	–	1
Haskell		–		2	–	7	–	0
Heidelberg		–		1	–	7	–	0
Michigan State Normal		–		0	–	5	–	1
Ohio		–		0	–	6	–	1

The 1910 North Dakota Agricultural Aggies football team was an American football team that represented North Dakota Agricultural College (now known as North Dakota State University) as an independent during the 1910 college football season. In their second year under head coach Arthur Rueber, the team compiled a 2–3 record.

== Schedule ==
Date	Opponent	Site	Result	Source
October 8	Wahpeton Indian School	Dacotah Field; Fargo, ND	W 79–0	
October 15	Wahpeton	Dacotah Field; Fargo, ND	W 16–0	
October 21	South Dakota State	Dacotah Field; Fargo, ND (rivalry)	L 3–6	
November 5	at North Dakota	Grand Forks, ND (rivalry)	L 0–18	
November 11	Fargo	Dacotah Field; Fargo, ND	L 2–11	
