= 1910 Buchtel football team =

American college football season

1910 Buchtel football
- Conference: Independent
- Record: 7–2
- Head coach: Frank Haggerty (1st season)
- Captain: Lee Jackson
- Home stadium: League Park

1910 Midwestern college football independents records
	Conf.			Overall
Team	W	L	T	W		L		T
Wabash		–		4	–	0	–	0
Michigan Agricultural		–		6	–	1	–	0
St. Mary's (OH)		–		5	–	1	–	0
Central Michigan		–		5	–	1	–	1
Marquette		–		6	–	1	–	2
Notre Dame		–		4	–	1	–	1
Buchtel		–		7	–	2	–	0
Saint Louis		–		7	–	2	–	0
Michigan		–		3	–	0	–	3
Fairmount		–		6	–	2	–	1
Lake Forest		–		5	–	2	–	0
Western State Normal		–		4	–	2	–	0
Northern Illinois State		–		4	–	2	–	1
Mount Union		–		4	–	2	–	2
South Dakota State		–		4	–	2	–	2
Detroit College		–		3	–	2	–	0
Doane		–		3	–	2	–	1
Butler		–		4	–	3	–	1
Rose Poly		–		4	–	4	–	0
North Dakota Agricultural		–		2	–	3	–	0
Miami (OH)		–		2	–	4	–	1
Carthage		–		2	–	4	–	0
Ohio Northern		–		2	–	5	–	0
Iowa State Teachers		–		1	–	4	–	1
Haskell		–		2	–	7	–	0
Heidelberg		–		1	–	7	–	0
Michigan State Normal		–		0	–	5	–	1
Ohio		–		0	–	6	–	1

The 1910 Buchtel football team represented Buchtel College in the 1910 college football season. The team was led by head coach Frank Haggerty, in his first season. Buchtel outscored their opponents by a total of 136–83.

== Schedule ==
Date	Time	Opponent	Site	Result	Attendance	Source
September 24		at Western Reserve	Cleveland, OH	L 0–7		
October 1		at Oberlin	Oberlin, OH	W 3–0		
October 8		Wooster	League Park; Akron, OH	W 31–0		
October 15	2:30 p.m.	Hiram	League Park; Akron, OH	W 40–0	3,000	
October 22		at Notre Dame	Cartier Field; Notre Dame, IN	L 0–51		
October 29		at Mount Union	Alliance, OH	W 5–3		
November 5		at Heidelberg	Tiffin, OH	W 23–5		
November 12		Allegheny	League Park; Akron, OH	W 12–6		
November 24		Marietta	League Park; Akron, OH	W 22–11		
