= 1910 Miami Redskins football team =

American college football season

1910 Miami Redskins football
- Conference: Independent
- Record: 2–4–1
- Head coach: Harold Iddings (2nd season)
- Home stadium: Miami Field

1910 Midwestern college football independents records
	Conf.			Overall
Team	W	L	T	W		L		T
Wabash		–		4	–	0	–	0
Michigan Agricultural		–		6	–	1	–	0
St. Mary's (OH)		–		5	–	1	–	0
Central Michigan		–		5	–	1	–	1
Marquette		–		6	–	1	–	2
Notre Dame		–		4	–	1	–	1
Buchtel		–		7	–	2	–	0
Saint Louis		–		7	–	2	–	0
Michigan		–		3	–	0	–	3
Fairmount		–		6	–	2	–	1
Lake Forest		–		5	–	2	–	0
Western State Normal		–		4	–	2	–	0
Northern Illinois State		–		4	–	2	–	1
Mount Union		–		4	–	2	–	2
South Dakota State		–		4	–	2	–	2
Detroit College		–		3	–	2	–	0
Doane		–		3	–	2	–	1
Butler		–		4	–	3	–	1
Rose Poly		–		4	–	4	–	0
North Dakota Agricultural		–		2	–	3	–	0
Miami (OH)		–		2	–	4	–	1
Carthage		–		2	–	4	–	0
Ohio Northern		–		2	–	5	–	0
Iowa State Teachers		–		1	–	4	–	1
Haskell		–		2	–	7	–	0
Heidelberg		–		1	–	7	–	0
Michigan State Normal		–		0	–	5	–	1
Ohio		–		0	–	6	–	1

The 1910 Miami Redskins football team was an American football team that represented Miami University as an independent during the 1910 college football season. Led by coach Harold Iddings in his second and final year, Miami compiled a 2–4–1 record.

== Schedule ==
Date	Time	Opponent	Site	Result	Source
October 1		Wilmington (OH)	Miami Field; Oxford, OH	W 5–0	
October 8		at Central University	Cheek Field; Danville, KY	L 2–12	
October 22		DePauw	Miami Field; Oxford, OH	L 0–11	
October 29	2:30 p.m.	at Cincinnati	League Park; Cincinnati, OH (rivalry)	L 0–3	
November 5		at Marietta	Marietta, OH	L 0–17	
November 12		Wittenberg	Miami Field; Oxford, OH	W 19–0	
November 24		at Butler	Washington Park; Indianapolis, IN	T 0–0	
