= 1910 Michigan Wolverines football team =

American college football season

1910 Michigan Wolverines football
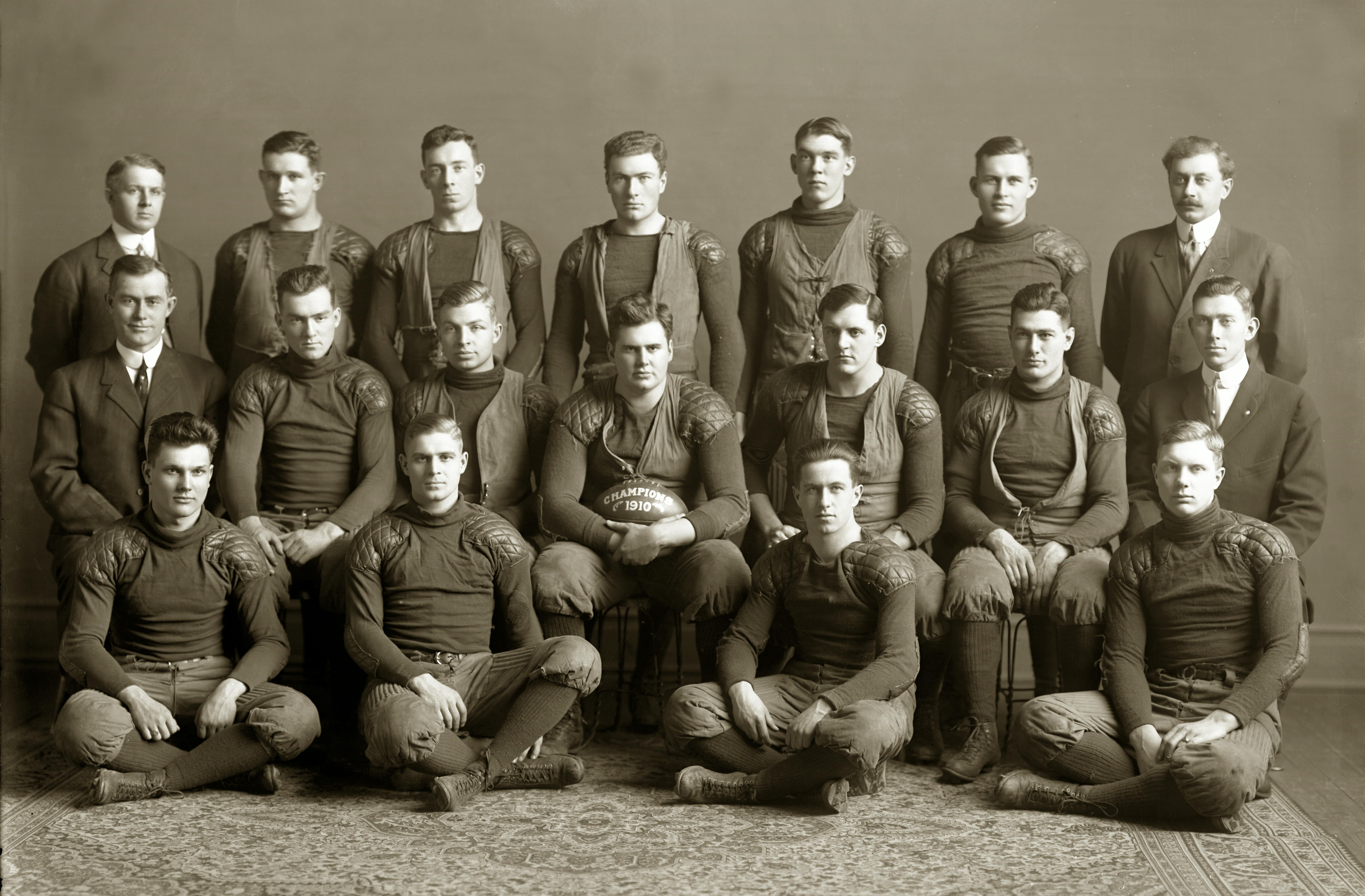

National champion (Billingsley)
- Conference: Independent
- Record: 3–0–3
- Head coach: Fielding H. Yost (10th season)
- Captain: Albert Benbrook
- Home stadium: Ferry Field

Uniform
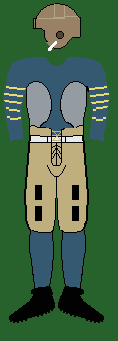

1910 Midwestern college football independents records
	Conf.			Overall
Team	W	L	T	W		L		T
Wabash		–		4	–	0	–	0
Michigan Agricultural		–		6	–	1	–	0
St. Mary's (OH)		–		5	–	1	–	0
Central Michigan		–		5	–	1	–	1
Marquette		–		6	–	1	–	2
Notre Dame		–		4	–	1	–	1
Buchtel		–		7	–	2	–	0
Saint Louis		–		7	–	2	–	0
Michigan		–		3	–	0	–	3
Fairmount		–		6	–	2	–	1
Lake Forest		–		5	–	2	–	0
Western State Normal		–		4	–	2	–	0
Northern Illinois State		–		4	–	2	–	1
Mount Union		–		4	–	2	–	2
South Dakota State		–		4	–	2	–	2
Detroit College		–		3	–	2	–	0
Doane		–		3	–	2	–	1
Butler		–		4	–	3	–	1
Rose Poly		–		4	–	4	–	0
North Dakota Agricultural		–		2	–	3	–	0
Miami (OH)		–		2	–	4	–	1
Carthage		–		2	–	4	–	0
Ohio Northern		–		2	–	5	–	0
Iowa State Teachers		–		1	–	4	–	1
Haskell		–		2	–	7	–	0
Heidelberg		–		1	–	7	–	0
Michigan State Normal		–		0	–	5	–	1
Ohio		–		0	–	6	–	1

The 1910 Michigan Wolverines football team represented the University of Michigan as an independent during the 1910 college football season. The team's head coach was Fielding H. Yost in his 10th season at Michigan. While playing a schedule that included some of the best teams in the country, Michigan compiled an undefeated 3–0–3 record and outscored opponents 29 to 9. Early in the season, the Wolverines defeated a Michigan Agricultural Aggies team that compiled a record of 6–0 and outscored opponents other than Michigan 165 to 2 (including a 17–0 victory over Notre Dame). The Wolverines tied a Penn team that compiled a 9–1–1 record in 1910 while outscoring opponents 184 to 19. They also tied an Ohio State team that finished the season with a 6–1–3 record and outscored opponents 182 to 27 and a Case team that handed Ohio State its only defeat. In the final game of the season, Michigan shut out an undefeated Minnesota team that had outscored its previous opponents 179 to 0.

On defense, the 1910 Wolverines did not give up a touchdown all season, shut out the final three opponents, and gave up an average of 1.5 points per game. At the end of the season, the team was recognized as the champions of the west.

Three Michigan players received first-team All-American honors. Left guard and team captain Albert Benbrook was selected as a consensus first-team All-American for the second consecutive year. Stanfield Wells, who played three games at right tackle and three games at right end, was selected as a first-team All-American by Walter Camp. Left halfback Joe Magidsohn was the team's leading scorer and also received first-team All-American honors from some selectors. Six Michigan players received first-team All-Western honors, including Benbrook, Wells, Magidsohn, tackle William P. Edmunds, end Stanley Borleske, and center Arthur Cornwell.

== Schedule ==
Date	Opponent	Site	Result	Attendance
October 8	Case	Ferry Field; Ann Arbor, MI	T 3–3	3,500
October 15	Michigan Agricultural	Ferry Field; Ann Arbor, MI (rivalry)	W 6–3	
October 22	at Ohio State	Ohio Field; Columbus, OH (rivalry)	T 3–3	
October 29	at Syracuse	Archbold Stadium; Syracuse, NY	W 11–0	11,500
November 12	at Penn	Franklin Field; Philadelphia, PA	T 0–0	
November 19	Minnesota^{†}	Ferry Field; Ann Arbor, MI (Little Brown Jug)	W 6–0	18,000
^{†}Homecoming

== Season summary ==
=== Pre-season ===
In August 1910, Dave Allerdice, captain of the 1909 Michigan Wolverines football team, was hired as an assistant coach with responsibility for developing a kicker. Allerdice joined Prentiss Douglass, Germany Schulz, and Curtis Redden as Fielding H. Yost's assistant coaches.

Michigan opened its pre-season training camp at Whitmore Lake, Michigan, on September 19, 1910. Coach Yost opined that the 1910 season would see a more open style of play under the new rules with reduced risk of injuries. Training camp began with light conditioning work, then progressed to "more strenuous labors." The squad began with 11 players at Whitmore Lake but grew larger as more players arrived over the two weeks. Halfback Joe Magidsohn arrived at Whitemore Lake ten days later but was in "splendid condition after hard summer's work." In late September, Yost announced that Shorty McMillan of Detroit would take over the quarterback spot held the prior year by Billy Wasmund.

As the work at Whitmore Lake concluded, the Detroit Free Press wrote that the team was "rounding into form rapidly" and looked "like a machine." The Free Press opined that the backfield showed plenty of speed, and the line appeared to be Michigan's strongest in years. Pre-season practice continued at Ferry Field during the first week of October.

On October 5, 1910, Michigan announced that Grover "Dutch" Herrington, regarded by Coach Yost as "one of the most promising backfield men he has found in several seasons", had suffered a broken bone in his right leg and would be unable to play during the 1910 season.

=== Case ===
Week 1: Case at Michigan

Team	1	2	3	4	Total
Case	0	3	0	0	3
Michigan	3	0	0	0	3

- Date: October 8, 1910
- Location: Ferry Field
  Ann Arbor, Michigan
- Referee: George Eldridge (Michigan)

Michigan opened its 1910 season at Ferry Field in a 3–3 tie with the team from Cleveland's Case Scientific School. The game was the 14th meeting between the two programs, and Michigan had won all 13 of the prior games by a combined score of 354 to 37. On the eve of the 1910 season opener against Case, Coach Yost expressed satisfaction with his team: "These boys are playing fine football. They are the best we have sent against Case in the past five years." The game was played in good weather before the largest opening day crowd in Michigan history.

In the first quarter, Michigan received excellent field position after a Case punt from behind the goal line traveled only 31 yards. After advancing to the seven-yard line, right guard George M. Lawton place-kicked a field goal from the 20-yard line. In the second quarter, Case received excellent field position when Lawton punted from behind Michigan's goal line. Case's quarterback Goss made a fair catch at the 33-yard line. Heller kicked a field goal to tie the score.

In the Detroit Free Press, E. A. Batchelor wrote:

"For the first time in many years what had come to be regarded as a fixed festival here will be omitted in 1910, for Case, instead of submitting meekly to the annual licking, played Michigan to a standstill . . . This is all very lovely for the Clevelanders who consider the feat of tying the Yost team the event of their lives, but it's tough on Michigan which has become accustomed to whaling Case as an official and auspicious opening for the local football season."

The game was played in 10-minute quarters. Michigan's starting lineup against Case was Daniels (left end), Edmunds (left tackle), Benbrook (left guard), Cole (center), Lawton (right guard), Wells (right tackle), Pattengill (right end), McMillan (quarterback), Magidsohn (left halfback), Green (right halfback), and Wenner (fullback). Branch Rickey served as the head linesman.

=== Michigan Agricultural ===
Week 2: Michigan Agricultural at Michigan

Team	1	2	3	4	Total
Michigan Agricultural	0	0	3	0	3
• Michigan	0	0	0	6	6

- Date: October 15, 1910
- Location: Ferry Field
  Ann Arbor, Michigan
- Referee: Ralph Hoagland (Princeton)

In the second week of the season, Michigan defeated Michigan Agricultural by a 6–3 score at Ferry Field. It was the fifth game in the Michigan–Michigan State football rivalry, and Michigan had a 3–0–1 record in the four prior meetings, outscoring the Aggies by a combined total of 204 to 0. The Aggies came into the 1910 game at Ann Arbor with a 2–0 record, having beaten two prior opponents by a total of 46 to 0. The 1910 Aggies compiled a record of 6–0 and outscored opponents 165 to 2 against teams other than the Wolverines (including a 17–0 victory over Notre Dame. Prior to the Michigan game, the M. A. C. student body adopted the slogan, "On to Michigan."

After a scoreless first half, the Aggies blocked two punts by George C. Thomson in the third quarter. On the second occasion, Thomson kicked from his 50-yard line, and the low punt was blocked and rolled to Michigan's 12-yard line where the Aggies' left tackle Campbell recovered the ball. After Michigan stopped two runs, the Aggies' right halfback, Hill, kicked a field goal from the 21-yard line. The Aggies' maintained a 3–0 into the fourth quarter. With less than five minutes left in the game, Shorty McMillan completed a pass to Stanley Borleske who ran 50 yards to the Aggies' 15-yard line. Don Green then carried the ball to the three-yard line. Due to a penalty, the Wolverines had five unsuccessful chances to score the touchdown after advancing to the three-yard line. Michigan then lined up for a field goal, but the play was a fake. Green took the snap from center and ran for the touchdown. Conklin kicked the extra point, and Michigan won by a score of 6 to 3.

After the game, Coach Yost praised the Michigan Agricultural team as "remarkably strong." The referee, Ralph Hoagland, commented on Michigan's use of the news rules: "Yost has certainly taught his men some great things about the forward pass."

The game was played in 15-minute quarters. Michigan's starting lineup against Michigan Agricultural was Borleske (left end), Edmunds (left tackle), Benbrook (left guard), Bogle (center), Conklin (right guard), Wells (right tackle), Pattengill (right end), McMillan (quarterback), Magidsohn (left halfback), Green (right halfback), and Thomson (fullback). Branch Rickey was the head linesman.

=== At Ohio State ===
Week 3: Michigan at Ohio State

Team	1	2	3	4	Total
Michigan	0	3	0	0	3
Ohio State	0	3	0	0	3

- Date: October 22, 1910
- Location: Ohio Field • Columbus, Ohio
- Game attendance: 5,000
- Referee: Horatio B. Hackett

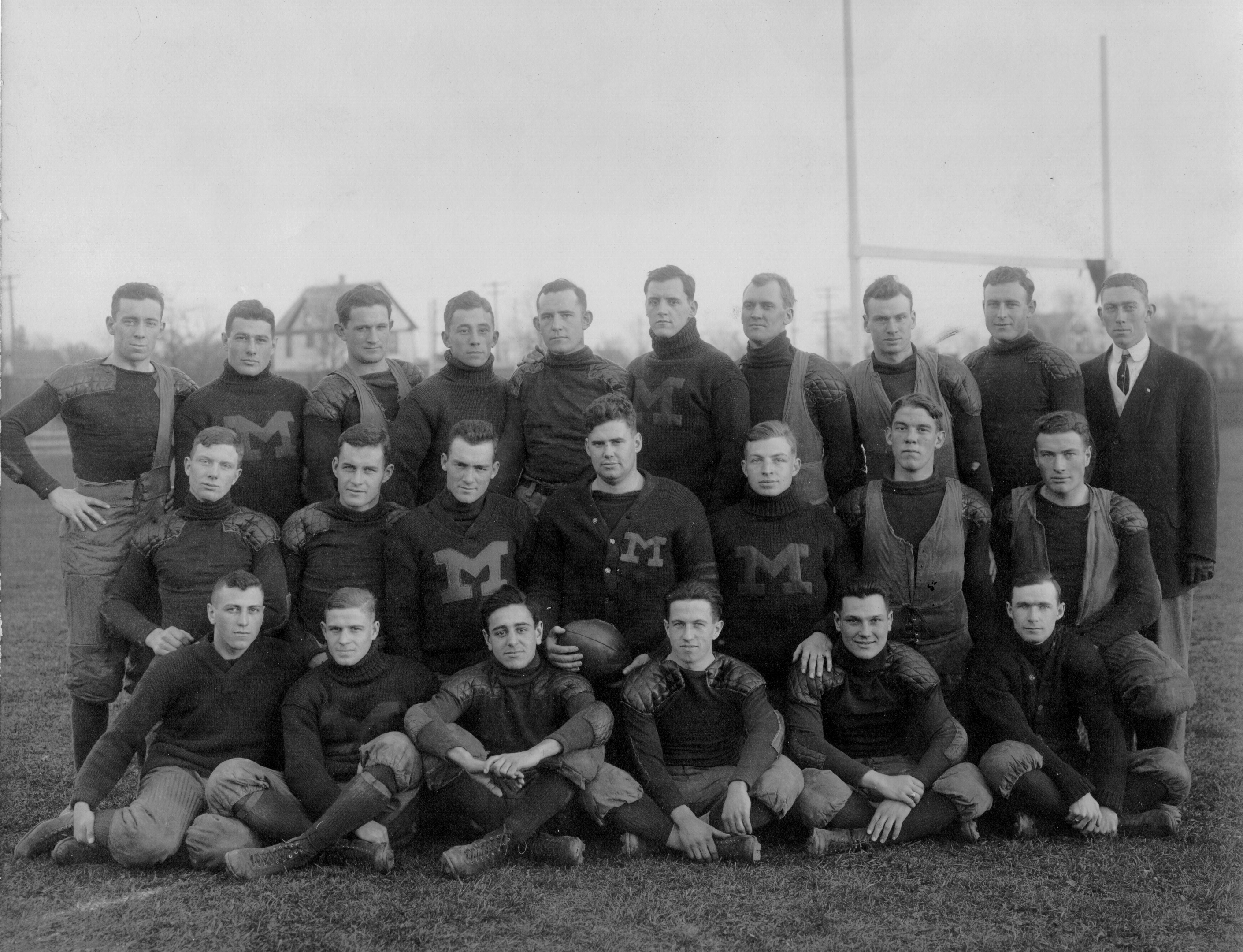
Team portrait taken on Ferry Field, c. October 1910

In the third week of the 1910 season, Michigan played Ohio State to a 3–3 tie at Columbus, Ohio. The game was the 12th meeting in the Michigan–Ohio State football rivalry, with Michigan having won ten of the prior meetings and tied once. The 1910 Ohio State team was coached by former Yale coach, Howard Jones, who was later inducted into the College Football Hall of Fame.

The only scoring in the game consisted of an exchange of field goals in the second quarter. A forward pass from Shorty McMillan to Stanfield Wells took the ball to the Ohio State five-yard line. After an offside penalty and no gain on a fake kick, Frederick L. Conklin kicked a field goal from the 15-yard line to give Michigan a 3–0 lead. Ohio State tied the score with a field goal by its left halfback, Wells, later in the second quarter. Neither team scored in the second half.

The Detroit Free Press reported on the celebratory atmosphere in Columbus after the game:

Seldom has such a demonstration been seen on Ohio field as was carried out by the O. S. U. rooters when the teams left the field after the final whistle. The band played, the rooters swarmed the field, hugged their mule mascot and went daffy in general. The town is in the hands of the celebrators tonight, the State contingent considering a tie score practically a victory for their team.

Michigan's lineup against Ohio State (starters listed first) was Borleske (left end), Edmunds (left tackle), Benbrook (left guard), Bogle and Cole (center), Conklin (right guard), Wells (right tackle), Pattengill (right end), McMillan (quarterback), Magidsohn (left halfback), Green (right halfback), and Thomson (fullback). Ralph Hoagland of Princeton was the umpire. John Esterline of Purdue was the field judge.

=== At Syracuse ===
Week 4: Michigan at Syracuse

Team	1	2	3	4	Total
• Michigan	11	0	0	0	11
Syracuse	0	0	0	0	0

- Date: October 29, 1910
- Location: Archbold Stadium • Syracuse, New York
- Referee: David L. Fultz (Brown)

In the fourth week of the 1910 season, Michigan shut out Syracuse, 11 to 0, before a crowd of 11,500 persons at Archbold Stadium in Syracuse, New York. The game was the third played between the schools, with each team having won one game.

Joe Magidsohn scored two touchdowns for Michigan. The New York Times wrote of Magidsohn: "The work of this sturdy warrior was most brilliant from start to finish of the spectacular struggle. Both on the offensive and on the defensive he was a whirlwind . . ."

The Detroit Free Press wrote that "Michigan completely outclassed Syracuse in every department of the game." However, Michigan had several drives deep into Syracuse territory that resulted in no points. Early in the game, Syracuse held at its one-yard line. Michigan also was penalized for 105 yards in the game, and two of the penalties stopped drives that had penetrated close to Syracuse's goal. Michigan's point total was also limited due to its kicking game. Conklin converted one of two extra point attempts and missed five field goal attempts on a muddy field.

Michigan's defense held Syracuse to one first down in the entire game, and Syracuse never moved the ball to within 40 yards of Michigan's goal line. The game ended on an interception of a Syracuse pass by Magidsohn.

Michigan's lineup against Syracuse was Edmunds (left end), Conklin (left tackle), Benbrook (left guard), Cornwell (center), Quinn and Lawton (right guard), Cole (right tackle), Wells (right end), McMillan (quarterback), Magidsohn (left halfback), Pattengill and Green (right halfback), and Thomson (fullback).

=== Notre Dame (cancelled) ===
Michigan had been scheduled to play Notre Dame on November 5, 1910. Michigan protested Notre Dame's use of two players (George Philbrook and Ralph Dimmick) who had reportedly played more than four years of college football. After Notre Dame refused to bench the players, Michigan's Board of Control of Athletics canceled the game. The New York Times reported: "It is understood here that this ends all athletic relations between Michigan and Notre Dame." The two teams did not play again for more than 30 years, the longest break in the Michigan–Notre Dame football rivalry.

In lieu of the game with Notre Dame, Michigan played a game against the reserves on November 5. The game proved costly, as quarterback Shorty McMillan, who had played every minute of the first four games, sustained torn muscles in his shoulder. As a result of the injury, he was unable to play against Penn.

=== At Penn ===
Week 5: Michigan at Penn

Team	1	2	3	4	Total
Michigan	0	0	0	0	0
Penn	0	0	0	0	0

- Date: November 12, 1910
- Location: Franklin Field • Philadelphia
- Game attendance: 15,000
- Referee: Walter Eckersall (Chicago)

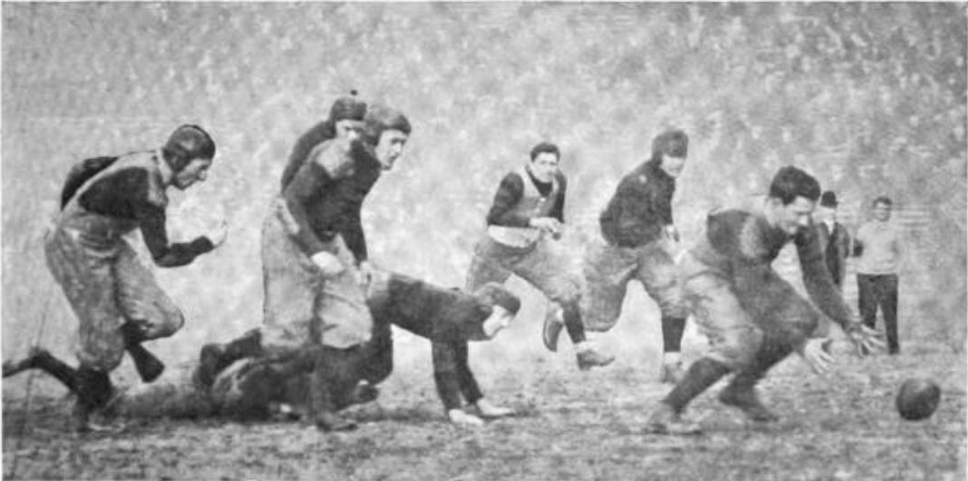
"Cole Attempts to Recover the Ball after Scott's Fumble" in the Penn game

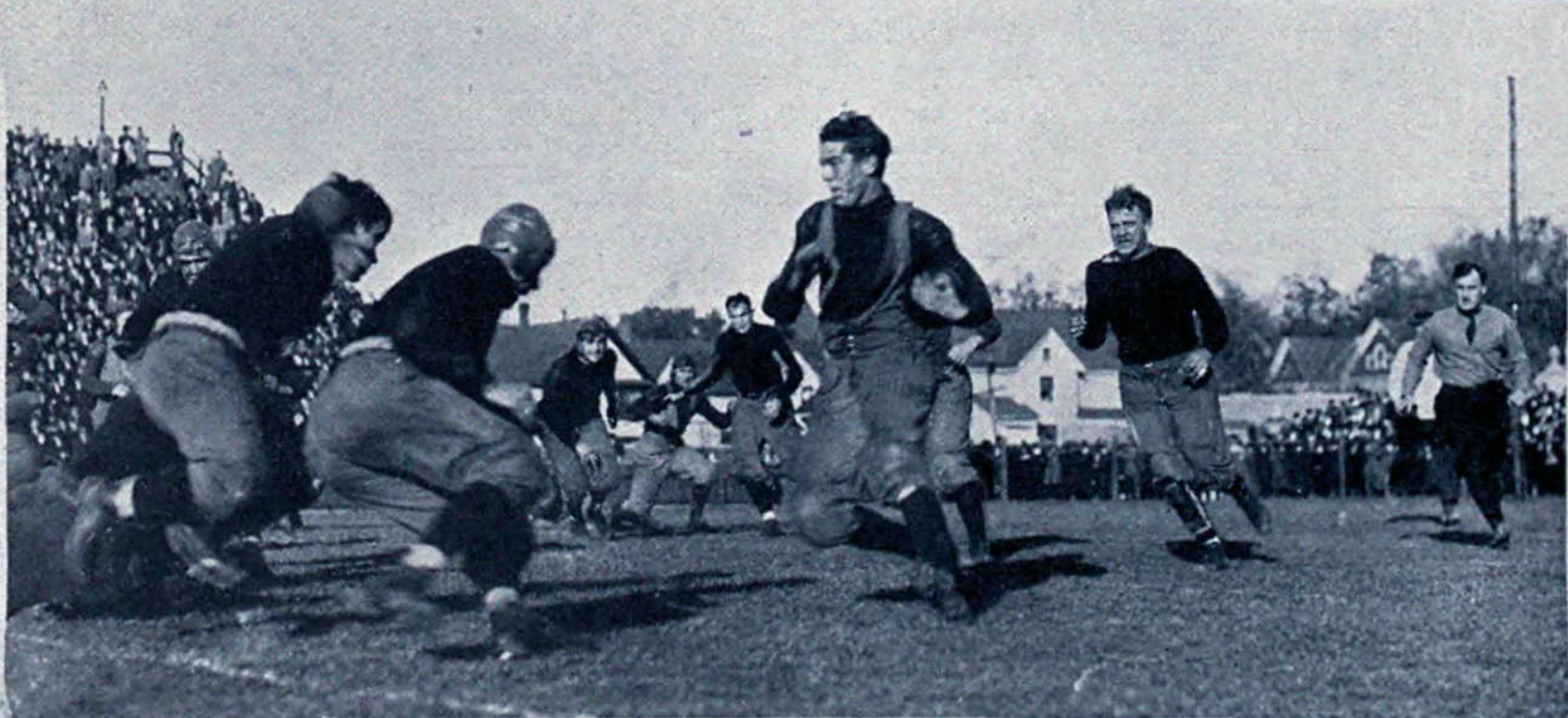
Running play during the Penn game

On November 12, 1910, Michigan played the Penn Quakers to a scoreless tie at Franklin Field in Philadelphia. Since leaving the Big Ten Conference, Michigan had played annual rivalry games against Penn at or near the end of the season. Penn was one of the dominant football programs of the era, winning seven national championships between 1894 and 1912. The 1910 game was the sixth meeting between the schools. Penn won the first four games, and Michigan won the 1909 game. Michigan arrived in Philadelphia on the Thursday afternoon before the game and set up camp in Wayne, Pennsylvania, a Philadelphia suburb.

Although the game ended in a scoreless tie, newspapers opined that Michigan had outplayed Penn. In the Detroit Free Press, E. A. Batchelor wrote: "In everything but the count, it was Michigan's game. Yost's men, quoted at the long price of 10 to 6 in the betting prior to the opening of hostilities, showed a spirit and strength that completely astounded the easterners. In gaining ground on line bucking, the invaders were so superior to the Quakers that there was no comparison." In the Chicago Daily Tribune, Walter Eckersall (who also served as the game's referee) wrote that the game was "the most important intersectional contest of the year", a fierce struggle of "the kind which makes football history", and "a decided triumph for western football." Eckersall wrote that Michigan's versatile offense bewildered Penn, and he described Yost's 1910 squad as "a team which has reached the pinnacle of football perfection."

One of Michigan's best scoring opportunities came on a punt from Penn quarterback Scott to Michigan end Victor Pattengill. Pattengill raised his hand for a fair catch at the Michigan 40-yard line, but was "buried in the sod" by several Penn players. The field judge Beacham did not see Pattengill call for the fair catch and did not call interference. Michigan protested, but the protest was overruled. Under 1910 rules, the penalty would have given Michigan a free kick from the Penn 25-yard line. On another occasion, Stanfield Wells caught a pass and ran 20 yards for what appeared to be a touchdown. However, an official ruled that Wells had "stepped outside" and the play was called back. A third scoring opportunity was lost after a fumble by Penn. Michigan's right tackle, Wheaton Cole, had the ball in front of him with a clear path ahead. Cole was unable to grab the football and "instead kicked it over the goal line where one of Mr. Penn's sons fell on it for a touchback that was a lifesaver to the Red and Blue hosts."

On another occasion, Michigan drove to Penn's eight-yard line and needed three yards for a first down. Wells carried the ball on fourth down and was stopped with the ball going to Penn on downs. Batchelor blamed Michigan's inability to score on a rule change preventing the ball carrier from being pushed or pulled across the goal line by his own teammates. He complained about the new game which "the reformers invented and handed to that element of the public which believes the gridiron pastime should be a sport for invalids in evening dress."

The game was rough and physical. Penn's halfback Sommer was ejected for kicking Frederick Conklin during a play. Despite the rough play, all eleven Michigan starters played the full 60 minutes without substitutions. Quarterback Shorty McMillan was twice hurt so badly that the trainer, Alvin Kraenzlein, had to work on him. Batchelor wrote that "though they did count nine on him", McMillan at the end of the game was still "barking signals and catching punts with all the ginger in the world."

Eckersall singled out Joe Magidsohn as the star of the game:

In Magidsohn, Michigan has a great half back, and his brilliant playing in today's game was the bright feature. He tore through the heavy Penn forwards for substantial gains, while his squirming, turning end runs added many yards to Michigan's total. He was equally effective on the defense, and his ability to solve Penn's offense and direct his team mates to the point of attack had a good deal to do with the checking of the local's best ground gaining plays. "Maggie" was in every play, and carried the ball a greater number of times than any other man of either eleven.

Batchelor praised the work of Michigan captain Albert Benbrook who loomed "like a mountain above the ruck of players" and on defense "smashed up plays with a vigor that sometimes threatened the very lives of the enemy." The Michigan student band traveled with the team to Philadelphia and burst into song "on the slightest provocation", with several band members "parading the field and defying the Quakers with the strains of 'The Victors.'"

Michigan's starting lineup against Penn was Edmunds (left end), Conklin (left tackle), Benbrook (left guard), Cornwell (center), Quinn (right guard), Cole (right tackle), Wells (right end), McMillan (quarterback), Magidsohn (left halfback), Pattengill (right halfback), and Thomson (fullback).

=== Minnesota ===
Week 6: Minnesota at Michigan

Team	1	2	3	4	Total
Minnesota	0	0	0	0	0
• Michigan	0	0	0	6	6

- Date: November 19, 1910
- Location: Ferry Field
  Ann Arbor, Michigan
- Game attendance: 20,000
- Referee: Lt. Horatio Hackett (Army)

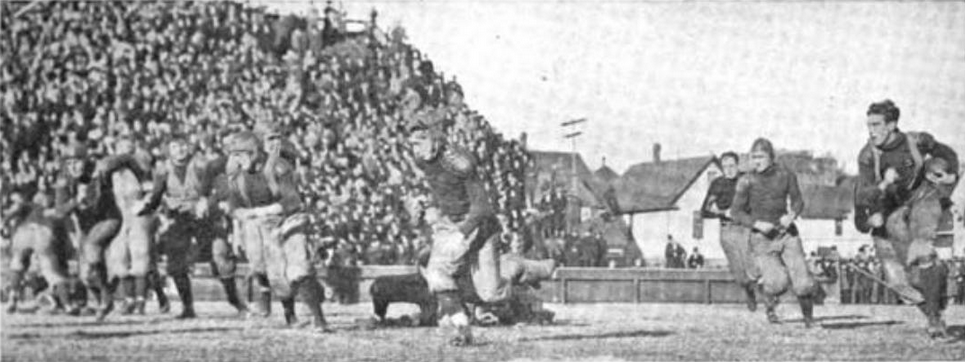
George M. Lawton running with the ball against Minnesota, November 1910

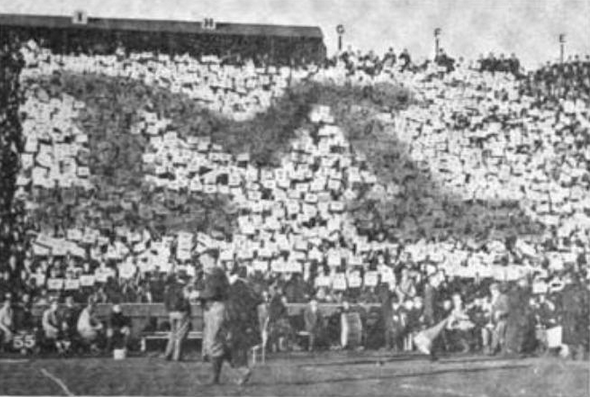
"The Block M Formed by Yellow and Blue Pennants" at the Minnesota game

After three consecutive road games, Michigan concluded its 1910 season at Ferry Field with a 6–0 victory over Minnesota in front of a crowd of more than 20,000 persons. The game was the ninth meeting between the two football programs, and the second game in which the teams competed for possession of the Little Brown Jug, the oldest rivalry trophy in American college football. Both teams came into the game undefeated and were considered the best teams in the west. Minnesota had a 6–0 record and had outscored its opponents 179 to 0. In the four weeks before the game, Minnesota had defeated Iowa State 49–0, Nebraska 27–0, Chicago 24–0, and Wisconsin 28–0. The game was expected to decide the western championship, and Minnesota fans sent the Gophers off with a parade in their honor. Some even opined that the contest would decide the national championship.

In the days leading up to the game, Minnesota officials reportedly challenged the eligibility of George C. Thomson to play against the Gophers. The dean of Michigan's literary department was deputized to investigate. The investigation concluded that Thomson's entrance credits were "equivalent to the requirements of the literary department, though not corresponding to the precise subjects enumerated in the university calendar." Nevertheless, Thomson did not play in the Minnesota game.

Neither team was able to score in the first three quarters. At the end of the third quarter, Michigan drove to the Minnesota nine-yard line. Following the three-minute intermission before the fourth quarter began, the drive stalled. Fullback George Lawton attempted a field goal, but his kick missed the mark by a foot. With five minutes remaining in the game, Michigan finally sustained a touchdown drive. Michigan began the drive at its own 53-yard line (midfield was the 55-yard line in 1910). With time running out, the Wolverines resorted to the forward pass. On the first play of the drive, Stanfield Wells threw to Stanley Borleske for a gain of 27 yards to the Minnesota 30-yard line. On the next play, Michigan ran the same play, and Borleske took the ball for 24 yards to the three-yard line. Wells ran with the ball on first down and was stopped for no gain. On second down, Wells again ran into the Minnesota defense. With a crowd of players on top of Wells, it was not clear initially whether he had crossed the goal line. When the referee separated the pile, Wells was holding the ball and had crossed over the goal line. E. A. Batchelor described the "Niagara of sound" that erupted from the stands:

Venerable professors, giddy freshmen, staid, and usually phlegmatic, business men, small boys, pretty girls and even sweet faced old ladies stood up and howled until their vocal chords refused to emit another sound. Down on the field the Michigan team, substitutes, coaches, band and everyone else who managed to pass the barriers and gain admittance to the inclosure [sic] set aside for the elect, swarmed out on the battle ground, mingling in one wild, joyous, shouting, hugging, handshaking mob.

It took several minutes for the officials to clear the field so that the game could be completed. Conklin kicked the extra point, and the game ended as Minnesota began to drive downfield after Lawton's kickoff. E. A. Batchelor summed up the victory over Minnesota:

Two perfectly executed forward passes, each swift and sure as a rapier's thrust; two plunges into the Minnesota line, and Michigan this afternoon has beaten the Gophers, won the undisputed championship of the west, established her claim to be considered the country's best and proved the superiority of skill and cunning over mere strength.

All eleven Michigan starters played the full 60 minutes without substitution. Quarterback Shorty McMillan sustained a broken rib and played the last hour with the injury. Batchelor praised McMillan for his courage: "That he must have endured agonies in such a bruising combat easily can be appreciated. The whole history of football records no gamer exhibition than this. Michigan men who were aware of the boy's condition cheered him until their throats were sore." Batchelor also praised Michigan's defensive effort, noting that "the tackling was deadly in its accuracy and fierceness."

Batchelor noted that the final minutes of the game were like the events that "occur mostly in books featured by the exploits of Frank Merriwell" and other fictional heroes. Batchelor also noted that Michigan played "the most open game that she had shown all season, using the forward pass time and again.

Michigan's starting lineup against Minnesota was Borleske (left end), Conklin (left tackle), Benbrook (left guard), Cornwell (center), Bogle (right guard), Edmunds (right tackle), Wells (right end), McMillan (quarterback), Magidsohn (left halfback), Pattengill (right halfback), and Lawton (fullback).

== Post-season ==
After the season had ended, The New York Times wrote that, by defeating Minnesota, Michigan had "captured the Western football championship." Walter Eckersall also concluded that Michigan was entitled to the western championship. He also wrote a column in the Chicago Daily Tribune opining that Michigan had the best offense in the country and that its defense was also as good as any other.

Three Michigan players received first-team All-American honors. Left guard and team captain Albert Benbrook was selected as a consensus first-team All-American for the second consecutive year. Stanfield Wells, who played three games at right tackle and three games at right end, was selected as a first-team All-American by Walter Camp. Left halfback Joe Magidsohn was the team's leading scorer with 10 points on two touchdown runs of 30 and 40 yards against Syracuse and also received first-team All-American honors from some selectors.

Six Michigan players received first-team All-Western honors. In the Chicago Daily Tribune, Walter Eckersall selected Michigan players for five of the eleven first-team positions on his All-Western team. The five players so honored by Eckersall were Benbrook (left guard), Wells (left end), Magidsohn (left halfback), William P. Edmunds (right tackle), and Stanley Borleske (right end). Michigan's Coach Yost also selected an All-Western team with five Michigan players. Yost's selections differed from Eckersall's only in the exclusion of Borleske and the inclusion of Arthur Cornwell at center. In Collier's Weekly, E. C. Patterson selected Benbrook as the best player in the West and named two other Michigan players to his All-Western team.

In the weeks after the conclusion of the 1910 football season, much attention was focused on the question of whether Michigan should return to the Big Eight Conference. Facing a threatened break in athletic relations with Amos Alonzo Stagg's Chicago Maroons and a rebuke from the conference, Minnesota was forced to cease scheduling games against Michigan. (Michigan remained independent of the conference until 1917 and would not play another game against Minnesota until 1919.)

== Players ==
=== Varsity letter winners ===
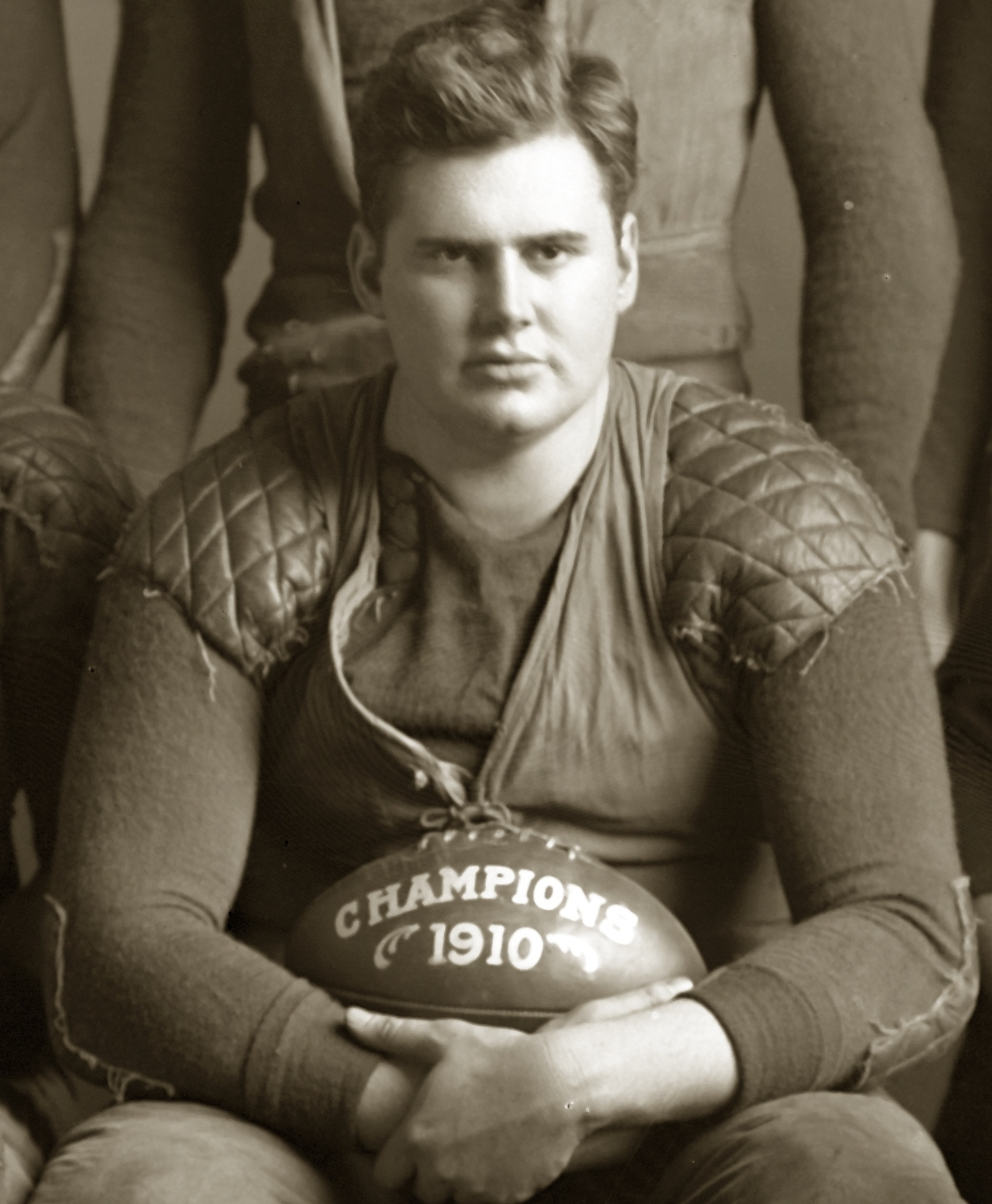
Team captain Albert Benbrook

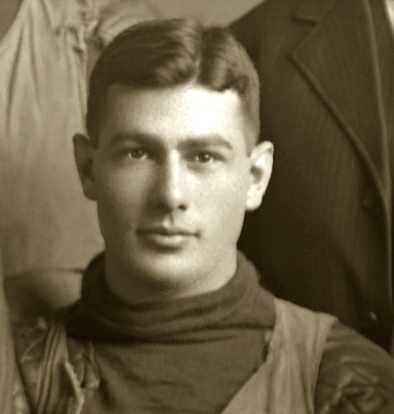
Halfback Joe Magidsohn

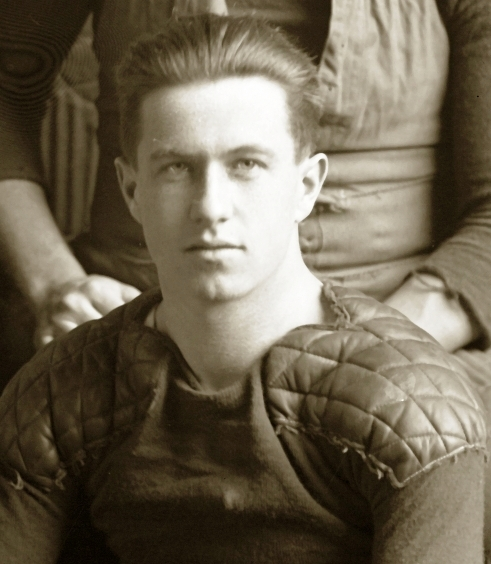
Quarterback Shorty McMillan

At the end of the 1910 season, 15 Michigan players were awarded varsity letter "M's" for their participation on the football team. They were:

- Albert Benbrook, Chicago – started 6 games at left guard
- Thomas A. Bogle, Jr., Ann Arbor, Michigan – started 2 games at center, 1 game at right guard
- Stanley Borleske, Spokane, Washington – started 3 games at left end
- Wheaton Dudley Cole, Oberlin Hall, Ohio – started 2 games at right tackle, 1 game at center
- Frederick Conklin, Ann Arbor, Michigan – started 3 games at left tackle, 2 games at right guard
- Arthur B. Cornwell, Saginaw, Michigan – started 3 games at center
- William P. Edmunds, Youngstown, Ohio – started 3 games at left tackle, 2 games at left end, 1 game at right tackle
- Donald W. Green, Saginaw, Michigan – started 3 games at right halfback
- George M. Lawton, Detroit – started 1 game at right guard, 1 game at fullback
- Joe Magidsohn, Elkton, Michigan – started 6 games at left halfback
- Neil "Shorty" McMillan, Detroit – started 6 games at quarterback
- Victor R. Pattengill, Lansing, Michigan – started 3 games at right halfback
- Clement Patrick Quinn, Saginaw, Michigan – started 2 games at right guard
- George C. Thomson, Cadillac, Michigan – started 4 games at fullback
- Stanfield Wells, Brewster, Michigan – started 3 games at right tackle, 3 games at right end

=== Reserves ===
- Louis Bleich, Buffalo, New York
- Fay G. Clark, San Bernardino, California
- Raymon D. Cooper, Detroit
- Wilbur M. Cunningham, Benton Harbor, Michigan
- Lewis E. Daniels, Cambridge, Massachusetts – started 1 game at left end
- Carroll B. Haff, Kansas City, Missouri
- James E. Hancock, Indianapolis, Indiana
- Adair Hotchkiss, Hotchkiss, Colorado
- Ralph J. Hurlburt, Portland, Oregon
- Ernest C. Kanzler, Saginaw, Michigan
- Glenn R. Madison, Ann Arbor, Michigan
- John J. McDermott, Hubbardston, Michigan
- Meyer Morton, Pine Grove Township, Michigan
- Emery J. Munson, Mendota, Illinois
- John A. Neelands, Northville, Michigan
- William Kirke Otis, Hovey Falls, Michigan
- Frank Picard, Saginaw, Michigan
- Charles E. Rickerhauser, Los Angeles
- Robert Shaw, Ovid, Michigan
- Rufus G. Siple, Ann Arbor, Michigan
- Harold F. Stock, Hillsdale, Michigan
- Rudolph D. Van Dyke, Lowell, Michigan
- Edward J. Walsh, Denver, Colorado
- Herbert Gale Watkins, Bay City, Michigan
- Henry L. Wenner, Tiffin, Ohio – started 1 game at fullback
- Charles E. Wyman, Nunica, Michigan

=== Scoring leaders ===
Player	Touchdowns	Extra points	Field goals	Points
Joe Magidsohn	2	0	0	10
Frederick L. Conklin	0	3	1	6
Stanfield Wells	1	0	0	5
Donald Green	1	0	0	5
George M. Lawton	0	0	1	3
Totals	4	3	2	29

== Awards and honors ==
- Captain: Albert Benbrook
- All-Americans: Albert Benbrook (Walter Camp, Tommy Clark, Evening Standard consensus team, Leslie's Weekly, New York Telegraph), Stanfield Wells (Walter Camp), Joe Magidsohn (Tommy Clark and New York Telegraph)
- All-Western: Albert Benbrook (Eckersall and Yost), Stanfield Wells (Eckersall and Yost), Joe Magidsohn (Eckersall and Yost), William P. Edmunds (Eckersall and Yost), Stanley Borleske (Eckersall only), and Arthur Cornwell (Yost only).

== Coaching staff ==
- Head coach: Fielding H. Yost
- Assistant coaches: Dave Allerdice, Prentiss Douglass, Germany Schulz, Curtis Redden
- Trainer: Alvin Kraenzlein
- Manager: Charles Gordon Spice
- Director of Outdoor Athletics: Philip Bartelme
