= 1910 Ohio Green and White football team =

American college football season

1910 Ohio Green and White football
- Conference: Independent
- Record: 0–6–1
- Head coach: Robert Wood (2nd season)

1910 Midwestern college football independents records
	Conf.			Overall
Team	W	L	T	W		L		T
Wabash		–		4	–	0	–	0
Michigan Agricultural		–		6	–	1	–	0
St. Mary's (OH)		–		5	–	1	–	0
Central Michigan		–		5	–	1	–	1
Marquette		–		6	–	1	–	2
Notre Dame		–		4	–	1	–	1
Buchtel		–		7	–	2	–	0
Saint Louis		–		7	–	2	–	0
Michigan		–		3	–	0	–	3
Fairmount		–		6	–	2	–	1
Lake Forest		–		5	–	2	–	0
Western State Normal		–		4	–	2	–	0
Northern Illinois State		–		4	–	2	–	1
Mount Union		–		4	–	2	–	2
South Dakota State		–		4	–	2	–	2
Detroit College		–		3	–	2	–	0
Doane		–		3	–	2	–	1
Butler		–		4	–	3	–	1
Rose Poly		–		4	–	4	–	0
North Dakota Agricultural		–		2	–	3	–	0
Miami (OH)		–		2	–	4	–	1
Carthage		–		2	–	4	–	0
Ohio Northern		–		2	–	5	–	0
Iowa State Teachers		–		1	–	4	–	1
Haskell		–		2	–	7	–	0
Heidelberg		–		1	–	7	–	0
Michigan State Normal		–		0	–	5	–	1
Ohio		–		0	–	6	–	1

The 1910 Ohio Green and White football team represented Ohio University as an independent during the 1910 college football season. Led by second-year head coach Robert Wood, the Green and White compiled a record of 0–6–1.

== Schedule ==
Date	Opponent	Site	Result	Attendance	Source
September 24	at Kentucky State College	Stoll Field; Lexington, KY	L 0–10	> 1,000	
October 1	at Denison	Granville, OH	L 0–12		
October 8	Marietta	Athens, OH	L 0–12		
October 22	Wilmington (OH)	Athens, OH	L 0–6		
October 29	at Pittsburgh	Forbes Field; Pittsburgh, PA	L 0–71		
November 5	Muskingum	Athens, OH	T 0–0		
November 12	Otterbein	Athens, OH	L 0–12		
