= 1910 Michigan Agricultural Aggies football team =

American college football season

1910 Michigan Agricultural Aggies football
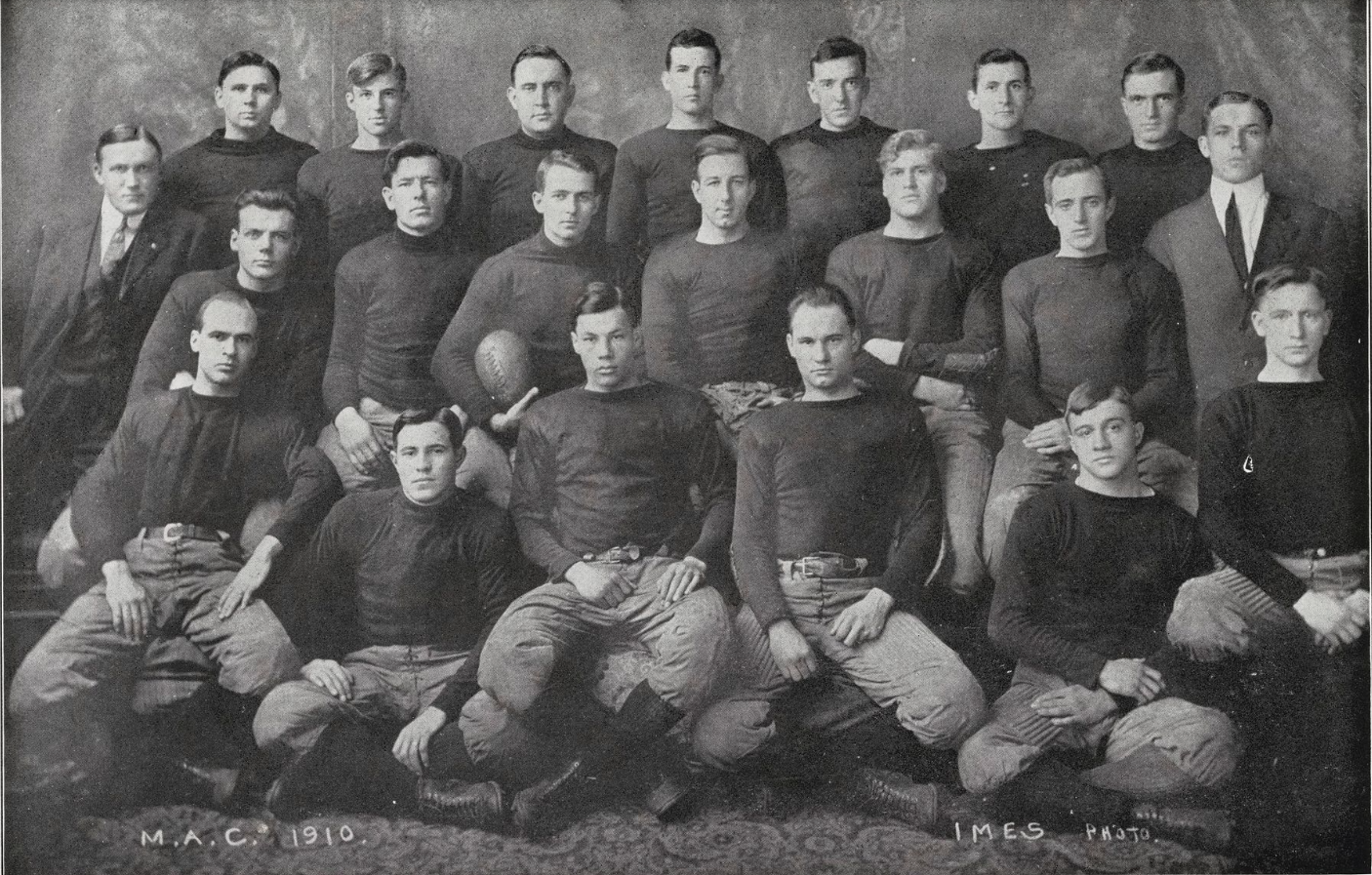
- Conference: Independent
- Record: 6–1
- Head coach: Chester Brewer (8th season)
- Captain: Ion Cortright
- Home stadium: College Field

1910 Midwestern college football independents records
	Conf.			Overall
Team	W	L	T	W		L		T
Wabash		–		4	–	0	–	0
Michigan Agricultural		–		6	–	1	–	0
St. Mary's (OH)		–		5	–	1	–	0
Central Michigan		–		5	–	1	–	1
Marquette		–		6	–	1	–	2
Notre Dame		–		4	–	1	–	1
Buchtel		–		7	–	2	–	0
Saint Louis		–		7	–	2	–	0
Michigan		–		3	–	0	–	3
Fairmount		–		6	–	2	–	1
Lake Forest		–		5	–	2	–	0
Western State Normal		–		4	–	2	–	0
Northern Illinois State		–		4	–	2	–	1
Mount Union		–		4	–	2	–	2
South Dakota State		–		4	–	2	–	2
Detroit College		–		3	–	2	–	0
Doane		–		3	–	2	–	1
Butler		–		4	–	3	–	1
Rose Poly		–		4	–	4	–	0
North Dakota Agricultural		–		2	–	3	–	0
Miami (OH)		–		2	–	4	–	1
Carthage		–		2	–	4	–	0
Ohio Northern		–		2	–	5	–	0
Iowa State Teachers		–		1	–	4	–	1
Haskell		–		2	–	7	–	0
Heidelberg		–		1	–	7	–	0
Michigan State Normal		–		0	–	5	–	1
Ohio		–		0	–	6	–	1

The 1910 Michigan Agricultural Aggies football team represented Michigan Agricultural College (MAC) as an independent during the 1910 college football season. In their eighth year under head coach Chester Brewer, the Aggies compiled a 6–1 record and outscored their opponents 168 to 8. Ion Cortright was the team captain. The season was regarded as the best in Michigan Agricultural football history up to that point.

The Aggies' 62 to 0 victory over Olivet was the program's largest margin of victory since 104 to 0 victory over Hillsdale in 1904.

== Schedule ==
Date	Opponent	Site	Result	Source
October 6	Detroit College (Note: The Michigan State Media Guide erroneously refers to the opponent as the Detroit Athletic Club. Contemporary coverage confirms that the opponent was actually Detroit College (later renamed the University of Detroit). Confusion may have resulted from the fact that Detroit College in 1910 played its home games on the Detroit Athletic Club's field.)	College Field; East Lansing, MI	W 35–0	
October 8	Alma	College Field; East Lansing, MI	W 11–0	
October 15	Michigan	Ferry Field; Ann Arbor, MI (rivalry)	L 3–6	
October 22	Lake Forest	College Field; East Lansing, MI	W 37–0	
October 29	Notre Dame	College Field; East Lansing, MI (rivalry)	W 17–0	
November 5	Marquette	Milwaukee, WI	W 3–2	
November 19	Olivet	College Field; East Lansing, MI	W 62–0	

== Game summaries ==
=== Michigan ===
Week 2: Michigan Agricultural at Michigan

Team	1	2	3	4	Total
Michigan Agricultural	0	0	3	0	3
• Michigan	0	0	0	6	6

- Date: October 15, 1910
- Location: Ferry Field
  Ann Arbor, MI
- Referee: Ralph Hoagland (Princeton)

On October 15, 1910, the Aggies lost to Michigan by a 6 to 3 score at Ferry Field. Michigan had a 3–0–1 record in the four prior meetings, outscoring the Aggies by a combined total of 204 to 0. Prior to the Michigan game, the M. A. C. student body adopted the slogan, "On to Michigan."

After a scoreless first half, the Aggies blocked two Michigan punts in the third quarter. On the second occasion, Michigan kicked from its 50-yard line, and the low punt was blocked and rolled to Michigan's 12-yard line where the Aggies' left tackle Campbell recovered the ball. After Michigan stopped two runs, the Aggies' right halfback, Hill, kicked a field goal from the 21-yard line. The Aggies' maintained a 3–0 into the fourth quarter. With less than five minutes left in the game, Michigan's Shorty McMillan completed a pass to Stanley Borleske who ran 50 yards to the Aggies' 15-yard line. Don Green then carried the ball to the three-yard line. Due to a penalty, the Wolverines had five unsuccessful chances to score the touchdown after advancing to the three-yard line. Michigan then lined up for a field goal, but the play was a fake. Green took the snap from center and ran for the touchdown. Conklin kicked the extra point, and Michigan won by a score of 6 to 3.

After the game, Coach Yost praised the Michigan Agricultural team as "remarkably strong."

== Players ==
- Ernest W. Baldwin, guard, Midland, Michigan
- James F. Campbell, tackle, Charlevoix, Michigan
- Edward G. Culver, guard, Midland, Michigan
- Leon J. Hill, halfback, Benton Harbor, Michigan
- Faunt V. Lenardson, guard, Britton, Michigan
- James E. McWilliams, center
- Roy M. Montford, end, Benton Harbor, Michigan
- Benjamin P. Patterson, tackle, Caro, Michigan
- William R. Riblet, quarterback, Elkhart, Indiana
- Fred A. Stone, end, Clare, Michigan
