= 1910 Rose Polytechnic football team =

American college football season

1910 Rose Polytechnic football
- Conference: Independent
- Record: 4–4
- Head coach: Heze Clark (3rd season)

1910 Midwestern college football independents records
| | Conf. | | | Overall |
| Team | W | L | T | W | | L | | T |
|---|---|---|---|---|---|---|---|---|
| Wabash | | – | | 4 | – | 0 | – | 0 |
| Michigan Agricultural | | – | | 6 | – | 1 | – | 0 |
| St. Mary's (OH) | | – | | 5 | – | 1 | – | 0 |
| Central Michigan | | – | | 5 | – | 1 | – | 1 |
| Marquette | | – | | 6 | – | 1 | – | 2 |
| Notre Dame | | – | | 4 | – | 1 | – | 1 |
| Buchtel | | – | | 7 | – | 2 | – | 0 |
| Saint Louis | | – | | 7 | – | 2 | – | 0 |
| Michigan | | – | | 3 | – | 0 | – | 3 |
| Fairmount | | – | | 6 | – | 2 | – | 1 |
| Lake Forest | | – | | 5 | – | 2 | – | 0 |
| Western State Normal | | – | | 4 | – | 2 | – | 0 |
| Northern Illinois State | | – | | 4 | – | 2 | – | 1 |
| Mount Union | | – | | 4 | – | 2 | – | 2 |
| South Dakota State | | – | | 4 | – | 2 | – | 2 |
| Detroit College | | – | | 3 | – | 2 | – | 0 |
| Doane | | – | | 3 | – | 2 | – | 1 |
| Butler | | – | | 4 | – | 3 | – | 1 |
| Rose Poly | | – | | 4 | – | 4 | – | 0 |
| North Dakota Agricultural | | – | | 2 | – | 3 | – | 0 |
| Miami (OH) | | – | | 2 | – | 4 | – | 1 |
| Carthage | | – | | 2 | – | 4 | – | 0 |
| Ohio Northern | | – | | 2 | – | 5 | – | 0 |
| Iowa State Teachers | | – | | 1 | – | 4 | – | 1 |
| Haskell | | – | | 2 | – | 7 | – | 0 |
| Heidelberg | | – | | 1 | – | 7 | – | 0 |
| Michigan State Normal | | – | | 0 | – | 5 | – | 1 |
| Ohio | | – | | 0 | – | 6 | – | 1 |

The 1910 Rose Polytechnic football team represented Rose Polytechnic Institute—now known as Rose–Hulman Institute of Technology—as an independent during the 1910 college football season. Led by third-year head Heze Clark, the team compiled a record of 4–4.

== Schedule ==
| Date | Time | Opponent | Site | Result | Attendance | Source |
|---|---|---|---|---|---|---|
| October 1 | | Eastern Illinois | Terre Haute, IN | W 42–0 | | |
| October 8 | | Vanderbilt | Dudley Field; Nashville, TN | L 0–23 | 3,500 | |
| October 15 | | DePauw | Greencastle, IN | L 0–5 | | |
| October 22 | 3:00 p.m. | Washington University | Francis Field; St. Louis, MO | L 0–6 | | |
| October 29 | | Culver Military Academy | Terre Haute, IN | W 18–15 | | |
| November 5 | | Hanover | Terre Haute, IN | W 33–0 | | |
| November 12 | | Notre Dame | Terre Haute, IN | L 3–41 | | |
| November 24 | | Bradley | Terre Haute, IN | W 42–0 | | |
All times are in Central time
