= 1910 Haskell Indians football team =

American college football season

1910 Haskell Indians football
- Conference: Independent
- Record: 2–7
- Head coach: Bill Caldwell (1st season)

1910 Midwestern college football independents records
	Conf.			Overall
Team	W	L	T	W		L		T
Wabash		–		4	–	0	–	0
Michigan Agricultural		–		6	–	1	–	0
St. Mary's (OH)		–		5	–	1	–	0
Central Michigan		–		5	–	1	–	1
Marquette		–		6	–	1	–	2
Notre Dame		–		4	–	1	–	1
Buchtel		–		7	–	2	–	0
Saint Louis		–		7	–	2	–	0
Michigan		–		3	–	0	–	3
Fairmount		–		6	–	2	–	1
Lake Forest		–		5	–	2	–	0
Western State Normal		–		4	–	2	–	0
Northern Illinois State		–		4	–	2	–	1
Mount Union		–		4	–	2	–	2
South Dakota State		–		4	–	2	–	2
Detroit College		–		3	–	2	–	0
Doane		–		3	–	2	–	1
Butler		–		4	–	3	–	1
Rose Poly		–		4	–	4	–	0
North Dakota Agricultural		–		2	–	3	–	0
Miami (OH)		–		2	–	4	–	1
Carthage		–		2	–	4	–	0
Ohio Northern		–		2	–	5	–	0
Iowa State Teachers		–		1	–	4	–	1
Haskell		–		2	–	7	–	0
Heidelberg		–		1	–	7	–	0
Michigan State Normal		–		0	–	5	–	1
Ohio		–		0	–	6	–	1

The 1910 Haskell Indians football team was an American football team that represented the Haskell Indian Institute (now known as Haskell Indian Nations University) as an independent during the 1910 college football season. In its first and only season under head coach Bill Caldwell, Haskell compiled a 2–7 record and was outscored by a total of 341 to 37.

Four of the team's losses were to programs that now play in Power Five conferences: Kansas State (0–39), Texas (3–63), Baylor (3–52), and Nebraska (0–119).

== Schedule ==
Date	Time	Opponent	Site	Result	Attendance	Source
October 1		at Kansas State	Manhattan, KS	L 0–39		
October 15		at Texas	Clark Field; Austin, TX	L 3–68		
October 18		at Baylor	Waco, TX	L 3–52		
October 21		at Baker	Baldwin City, KS	W 9–6		
October 29	2:30 p.m.	vs. Saint Louis	Gordon and Koppel Field; Kansas City, MO	L 0–16	1,200	
November 5		at Fairmount	Wichita, KS	L 0–35		
November 9		Fort Leavenworth	Lawrence, KS	W 22–0		
November 13		at Ottawa	Ottawa, KS	L 0–11		
November 24		at Nebraska	Nebraska Field; Lincoln, NE	L 0–119		
