= 1910 Marquette Blue and Gold football team =

American college football season

1910 Marquette Blue and Gold football
- Conference: Independent
- Record: 6–1–2
- Head coach: William Juneau (3rd season)

1910 Midwestern college football independents records
	Conf.			Overall
Team	W	L	T	W		L		T
Wabash		–		4	–	0	–	0
Michigan Agricultural		–		6	–	1	–	0
St. Mary's (OH)		–		5	–	1	–	0
Central Michigan		–		5	–	1	–	1
Marquette		–		6	–	1	–	2
Notre Dame		–		4	–	1	–	1
Buchtel		–		7	–	2	–	0
Saint Louis		–		7	–	2	–	0
Michigan		–		3	–	0	–	3
Fairmount		–		6	–	2	–	1
Lake Forest		–		5	–	2	–	0
Western State Normal		–		4	–	2	–	0
Northern Illinois State		–		4	–	2	–	1
Mount Union		–		4	–	2	–	2
South Dakota State		–		4	–	2	–	2
Detroit College		–		3	–	2	–	0
Doane		–		3	–	2	–	1
Butler		–		4	–	3	–	1
Rose Poly		–		4	–	4	–	0
North Dakota Agricultural		–		2	–	3	–	0
Miami (OH)		–		2	–	4	–	1
Carthage		–		2	–	4	–	0
Ohio Northern		–		2	–	5	–	0
Iowa State Teachers		–		1	–	4	–	1
Haskell		–		2	–	7	–	0
Heidelberg		–		1	–	7	–	0
Michigan State Normal		–		0	–	5	–	1
Ohio		–		0	–	6	–	1

The 1910 Marquette Blue and Gold football team was an American football team that represented Marquette University as an independent during the 1910 college football season. LEd by third-year head coach William Juneau, Marquette compiled a 6–1–2 record and outscored its opponents 267 to 11. Marquette's sole loss was a 3–2 decision against Michigan Agricultural, which finished the season 6–1.

== Schedule ==
Date	Opponent	Site	Result	Attendance	Source
October 8	Monmouth (IL)	Milwaukee, WI	W 32–0		
October 15	at Denver	Denver, CO	T 0–0		
October 19	at St. Mary's (KS)	St. Marys, KS	W 15–0		
October 22	at Creighton	Omaha, NE	W 18–3		
October 29	St. John's Northwestern Military Academy	Milwaukee, WI	W 92–0		
November 5	Michigan Agricultural	Milwaukee, WI	L 2–3	2,000	
November 12	at Loyola (IL)	Artesian Park; Chicago, IL	W 60–0		
November 19	Mount St. Charles	Milwaukee, WI	W 42–0		
November 24	Notre Dame	Milwaukee, WI	T 5–5	5,000	
