= 1910 Notre Dame Fighting Irish football team =

American college football season

1910 Notre Dame Fighting Irish football
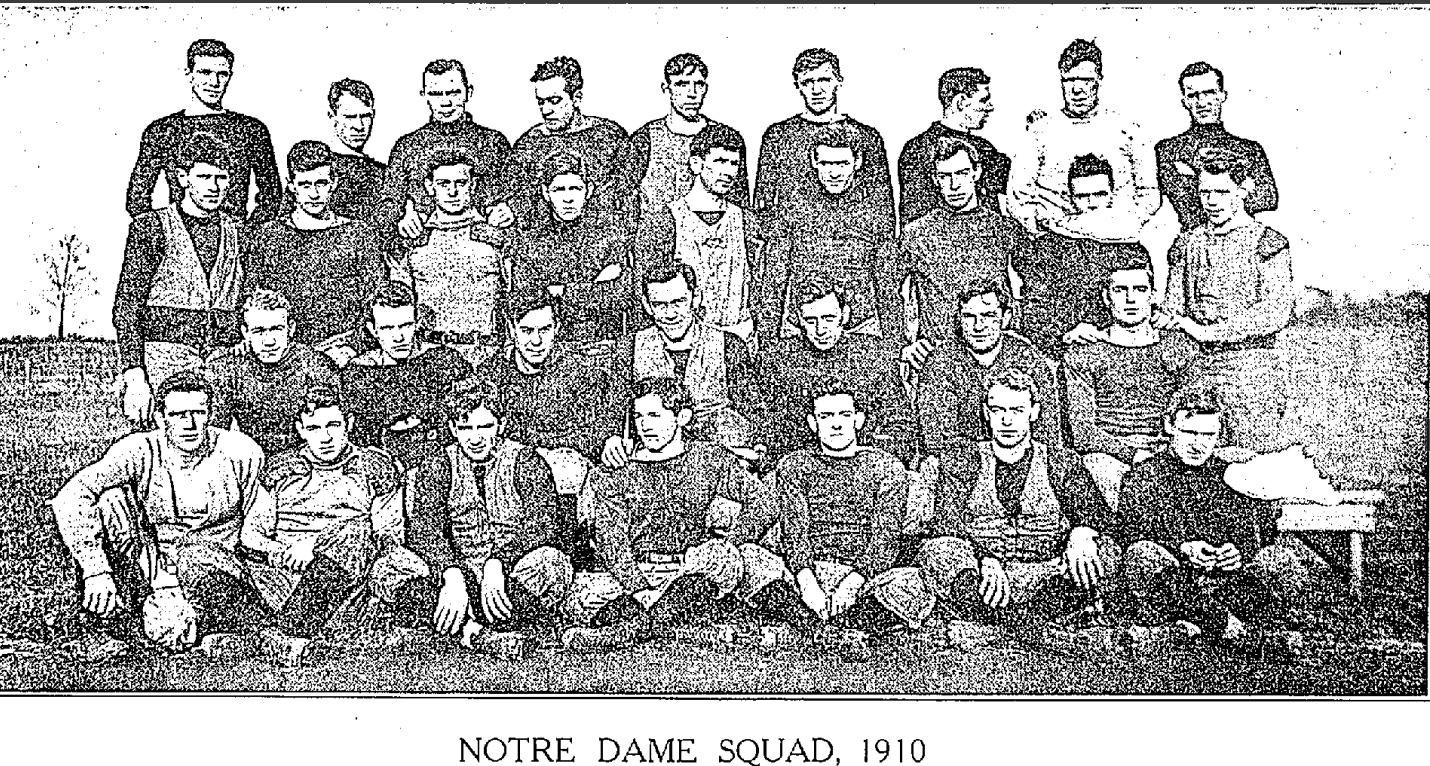
- Conference: Independent
- Record: 4–1–1
- Head coach: Frank Longman (2nd season)
- Captain: Ralph C. Dimick
- Home stadium: Cartier Field

1910 Midwestern college football independents records
	Conf.			Overall
Team	W	L	T	W		L		T
Wabash		–		4	–	0	–	0
Michigan Agricultural		–		6	–	1	–	0
St. Mary's (OH)		–		5	–	1	–	0
Central Michigan		–		5	–	1	–	1
Marquette		–		6	–	1	–	2
Notre Dame		–		4	–	1	–	1
Buchtel		–		7	–	2	–	0
Saint Louis		–		7	–	2	–	0
Michigan		–		3	–	0	–	3
Fairmount		–		6	–	2	–	1
Lake Forest		–		5	–	2	–	0
Western State Normal		–		4	–	2	–	0
Northern Illinois State		–		4	–	2	–	1
Mount Union		–		4	–	2	–	2
South Dakota State		–		4	–	2	–	2
Detroit College		–		3	–	2	–	0
Doane		–		3	–	2	–	1
Butler		–		4	–	3	–	1
Rose Poly		–		4	–	4	–	0
North Dakota Agricultural		–		2	–	3	–	0
Miami (OH)		–		2	–	4	–	1
Carthage		–		2	–	4	–	0
Ohio Northern		–		2	–	5	–	0
Iowa State Teachers		–		1	–	4	–	1
Haskell		–		2	–	7	–	0
Heidelberg		–		1	–	7	–	0
Michigan State Normal		–		0	–	5	–	1
Ohio		–		0	–	6	–	1

The 1910 Notre Dame Fighting Irish football team was an American football team that represented the University of Notre Dame as an independent during the 1910 college football season. In their second and final year under head coach Frank Longman, the Irish compiled a 4–1–1 record and outscored opponents by a total of 192 to 25. They won lopsided victories over four small college teams, lost to Michigan Agricultural (now known as Michigan State) and tied with Marquette. The loss to Michigan Agricultural was the first for a Notre Dame team since 1908.

Key players included freshman Gus Dorais, who won the spot as starting quarterback early in the season, and two large tackles, George Philbrook and Ralph Dimmick. Dimmick was also the team captain.

The team played its home games at Cartier Field in Notre Dame, Indiana.

== Schedule ==
Date	Opponent	Site	Result	Attendance	Source
October 8	Olivet	Cartier Field; Notre Dame, IN	W 48–0		
October 22	Buchtel	Cartier Field; Notre Dame, IN	W 51–0		
October 29	at Michigan Agricultural	Old College Field; East Lansing, MI (rivalry)	L 0–17		
November 12	at Rose Polytechnic	Terre Haute, IN	W 41–3		
November 19	Ohio Northern	Cartier Field; Notre Dame, IN	W 47–0		
November 24	at Marquette	Milwaukee, WI	T 5–5	5,000	

== Personnel ==
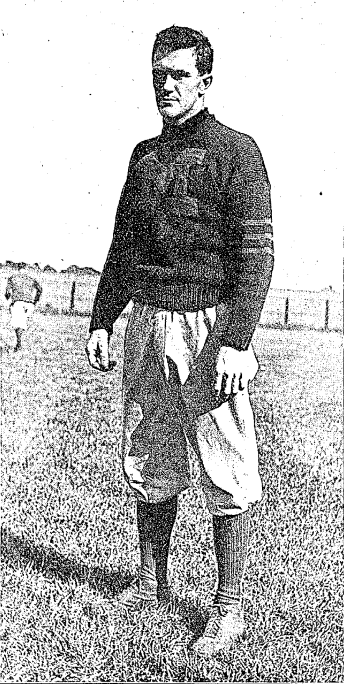
Head coach Frank Longman

The following 14 players received varsity letters for their participation on the 1910 team:

- Walter Clinnin, halfback
- Arthur Clippinger, fullback
- Joseph Collins, end
- Charles Crawley, end
- Ralph C. Dimick, captain and tackle
- Gus Dorais, quarterback
- Tom Foley, center
- Luke Kelley, guard
- William Martin, end
- Lee Mathews, halfback
- C. McGrath, fullback
- Turgis Oaas, guard
- George Philbrook, tackle
- John Stansfield, guard

Knute Rockne was a freshman at Notre Dame in 1910, participated in the football team, but did not win a varsity letter.

Frank Longman was the head coach, and "Cop" Lynch was the assistant coach. James Hope was the manager of athletics.
