= 1910 Saint Louis Billikens football team =

American college football season

1910 Saint Louis Billikens football
- Conference: Independent
- Record: 7–2
- Head coach: John R. Bender (1st season)
- Captain: Wagner
- Home stadium: University campus at King's Highway and Manchester Avenue, Sportsman's Park

1910 Midwestern college football independents records
	Conf.			Overall
Team	W	L	T	W		L		T
Wabash		–		4	–	0	–	0
Michigan Agricultural		–		6	–	1	–	0
St. Mary's (OH)		–		5	–	1	–	0
Central Michigan		–		5	–	1	–	1
Marquette		–		6	–	1	–	2
Notre Dame		–		4	–	1	–	1
Buchtel		–		7	–	2	–	0
Saint Louis		–		7	–	2	–	0
Michigan		–		3	–	0	–	3
Fairmount		–		6	–	2	–	1
Lake Forest		–		5	–	2	–	0
Western State Normal		–		4	–	2	–	0
Northern Illinois State		–		4	–	2	–	1
Mount Union		–		4	–	2	–	2
South Dakota State		–		4	–	2	–	2
Detroit College		–		3	–	2	–	0
Doane		–		3	–	2	–	1
Butler		–		4	–	3	–	1
Rose Poly		–		4	–	4	–	0
North Dakota Agricultural		–		2	–	3	–	0
Miami (OH)		–		2	–	4	–	1
Carthage		–		2	–	4	–	0
Ohio Northern		–		2	–	5	–	0
Iowa State Teachers		–		1	–	4	–	1
Haskell		–		2	–	7	–	0
Heidelberg		–		1	–	7	–	0
Michigan State Normal		–		0	–	5	–	1
Ohio		–		0	–	6	–	1

The 1910 Saint Louis Billikens football team was an American football team that represented Saint Louis University as an independent during the 1910 college football season. In their first season under head coach John R. Bender, the Billikens compiled a 7–2 record, shut out six of nine opponents, and outscored all opponents by a total of 96 to 22.

== Schedule ==
Date	Time	Opponent	Site	Result	Attendance	Source
September 24	3:00 p.m.	Shurtleff	University campus at King's Highway and Manchester Avenue; St. Louis, MO	W 25–0		
October 1	3:00 p.m.	Cape Girardeau Normal	University campus at King's Highway and Manchester Avenue; St. Louis, MO	W 22–0		
October 8	3:00 p.m.	Drury	University campus at King's Highway and Manchester Avenue; St. Louis, MO	W 18–6		
October 15	3:00 p.m.	Missouri Mines	University campus at King's Highway and Manchester Avenue; St. Louis, MO	W 3–0		
October 22	3:00 p.m.	Wabash	University campus at King's Highway and Manchester Avenue; St. Louis, MO	L 0–10	2,000	
October 29	2:30 p.m.	vs. Haskell	Gordon and Koppel Field; Kansas City, MO	W 16–0	1,200	
November 5	2:30 p.m.	Missouri	Sportsman's Park; St. Louis, MO	W 3–0	8,000	
November 12	2:30 p.m.	Kentucky State College	Sportsman's Park; St. Louis, MO	W 9–0		
November 24	2:30 p.m.	Syracuse	Sportsman's Park; St. Louis, MO	L 0–6		
