= 1910 Detroit College Tigers football team =

American college football season

1910 Detroit College Tigers football
- Conference: Independent
- Record: 3–2
- Head coach: George A. Kelly (3rd season)
- Captain: Herman J. Keller
- Home stadium: Detroit Athletic Club field

1910 Midwestern college football independents records
	Conf.			Overall
Team	W	L	T	W		L		T
Wabash		–		4	–	0	–	0
Michigan Agricultural		–		6	–	1	–	0
St. Mary's (OH)		–		5	–	1	–	0
Central Michigan		–		5	–	1	–	1
Marquette		–		6	–	1	–	2
Notre Dame		–		4	–	1	–	1
Buchtel		–		7	–	2	–	0
Saint Louis		–		7	–	2	–	0
Michigan		–		3	–	0	–	3
Fairmount		–		6	–	2	–	1
Lake Forest		–		5	–	2	–	0
Western State Normal		–		4	–	2	–	0
Northern Illinois State		–		4	–	2	–	1
Mount Union		–		4	–	2	–	2
South Dakota State		–		4	–	2	–	2
Detroit College		–		3	–	2	–	0
Doane		–		3	–	2	–	1
Butler		–		4	–	3	–	1
Rose Poly		–		4	–	4	–	0
North Dakota Agricultural		–		2	–	3	–	0
Miami (OH)		–		2	–	4	–	1
Carthage		–		2	–	4	–	0
Ohio Northern		–		2	–	5	–	0
Iowa State Teachers		–		1	–	4	–	1
Haskell		–		2	–	7	–	0
Heidelberg		–		1	–	7	–	0
Michigan State Normal		–		0	–	5	–	1
Ohio		–		0	–	6	–	1

The 1910 Detroit College Tigers football team was an American football team that represented Detroit College (later renamed the University of Detroit) as an independent during the 1910 college football season. In its third and final season under head coach George A. Kelly, the team compiled a 3–2 record, but was outscored by its opponents by a combined total of 67 to 38. End Herman J. Keller was the team captain.

The team opened the season with back-to-back losses Michigan Agricultural College (later renamed Michigan State University) and Olivet College, and ended the season with three victories over Hillsdale College, Adrian College, and Michigan State Normal School (later renamed Eastern Michigan University).

At a banquet for the football team held on December 12, coach George Kelly announced that he would not serve as the school's football coach in 1911.

== Schedule ==
Date	Opponent	Site	Result	Source
October 6	at Michigan Agricultural	College Field; East Lansing, MI	L 0–35	
October 13	at Olivet	Reed Field; Olivet, MI	L 5–29	
October 22	Hillsdale	Detroit Athletic Club field; Detroit, MI	W 6–0	
October 29	Adrian	Detroit Athletic Club field; Detroit, MI	W 11–3	
November 5	Michigan State Normal	Detroit Athletic Club field; Detroit, MI	W 16–0	

== Players ==
The following 13 players received varsity letters for their efforts on the 1910 Detroit College football team:

- Carney
- D'Haene
- Fitzgerald
- Flattery
- Greening
- Haigh
- Harbrecht
- Herman J. Keller, end and captain
- Kelly
- Martz
- McNamara
- Wilkinson
- Yockey
