= 1910 Michigan State Normal Normalites football team =

American college football season

1910 Michigan State Normal Normalites football
- Conference: Independent
- Record: 0–5–1
- Head coach: Curry Hicks (1st season)
- Captain: Carleton H. Runciman

1910 Midwestern college football independents records
	Conf.			Overall
Team	W	L	T	W		L		T
Wabash		–		4	–	0	–	0
Michigan Agricultural		–		6	–	1	–	0
St. Mary's (OH)		–		5	–	1	–	0
Central Michigan		–		5	–	1	–	1
Marquette		–		6	–	1	–	2
Notre Dame		–		4	–	1	–	1
Buchtel		–		7	–	2	–	0
Saint Louis		–		7	–	2	–	0
Michigan		–		3	–	0	–	3
Fairmount		–		6	–	2	–	1
Lake Forest		–		5	–	2	–	0
Western State Normal		–		4	–	2	–	0
Northern Illinois State		–		4	–	2	–	1
Mount Union		–		4	–	2	–	2
South Dakota State		–		4	–	2	–	2
Detroit College		–		3	–	2	–	0
Doane		–		3	–	2	–	1
Butler		–		4	–	3	–	1
Rose Poly		–		4	–	4	–	0
North Dakota Agricultural		–		2	–	3	–	0
Miami (OH)		–		2	–	4	–	1
Carthage		–		2	–	4	–	0
Ohio Northern		–		2	–	5	–	0
Iowa State Teachers		–		1	–	4	–	1
Haskell		–		2	–	7	–	0
Heidelberg		–		1	–	7	–	0
Michigan State Normal		–		0	–	5	–	1
Ohio		–		0	–	6	–	1

The 1910 Michigan State Normal Normalites football team represented Michigan State Normal College (later renamed Eastern Michigan University) as an independent during the 1910 college football season. In their first and only season under head coach Curry Hicks, the Normalites compiled a record of 0–5–1 and were outscored by their opponents by a combined total of 68 to 11. Carleton H. Runciman was the team captain. The 11 points scored by the team remains the Eastern Michigan record for fewest points scored in a season.

The team played its home games on a field that is now occupied by McKenny Union and a second field located on the campus mall between the Briggs Building and the Strong Building.

== Schedule ==
Date	Opponent	Site	Result	Source
October 8	at Adrian	Adrian, MI	T 5–5	
October 15	Alma	Ypsilanti, MI	L 6–22	
October 22	Detroit University School	Ypsilanti, MI	L 0–6	
November 5	at Detroit College	Detroit Athletic Club field; Detroit, MI	L 0–16	
November 12	at Central Michigan	Mount Pleasant, MI (rivalry)	L 0–13	
November 19	Hillsdale	Ypsilanti, MI	L 0–6	

== Players ==
The following 12 individuals received varsity letters for their participation on the 1910 Michigan State Normal football team.

- Glenn H. Avery, quarterback
- William H. Buhl, guard
- Guy A. Durgan, fullback/halfback/tackle
- Homer H. Hunt, halfback/quarterback
- Floyd D. Johnson, center/halfback
- John E. Monks, tackle/fullback/halfback
- Earl T. Oakes, guard
- Floyd D. Pierce, center/tackle
- Carleton H. Runciman, end, tackle, and team captain
- Ray W. Scalf, center
- John T. Symons, quarterback
- Vanderveer, fullback

Other players included the following:

- John B. Alford
- Anderson, tackle
- George P. Becker, end
- Bradshaw, end
- John C. Cole
- Leonard L. D'ooge, fullback/halfback
- Exelby, halfback
- Mayer, fullback
- W. Calvin McKean
- Edward P. Mears, guard
- Edgar H. Mumford
- Shirley L. Owens
- Leigh H. Simpson
- Wallace L. Van Alstine
- Earl J. Welch/Welsh, guard
