= 1910 Western State Normal Hilltoppers football team =

American college football season

1910 Western State Normal Hilltoppers football
- Conference: Independent
- Record: 4–2
- Head coach: William H. Spaulding (4th season)
- Captain: Alvin Berger
- Home stadium: Woodward Avenue grounds

1910 Midwestern college football independents records
	Conf.			Overall
Team	W	L	T	W		L		T
Wabash		–		4	–	0	–	0
Michigan Agricultural		–		6	–	1	–	0
St. Mary's (OH)		–		5	–	1	–	0
Central Michigan		–		5	–	1	–	1
Marquette		–		6	–	1	–	2
Notre Dame		–		4	–	1	–	1
Buchtel		–		7	–	2	–	0
Saint Louis		–		7	–	2	–	0
Michigan		–		3	–	0	–	3
Fairmount		–		6	–	2	–	1
Lake Forest		–		5	–	2	–	0
Western State Normal		–		4	–	2	–	0
Northern Illinois State		–		4	–	2	–	1
Mount Union		–		4	–	2	–	2
South Dakota State		–		4	–	2	–	2
Detroit College		–		3	–	2	–	0
Doane		–		3	–	2	–	1
Butler		–		4	–	3	–	1
Rose Poly		–		4	–	4	–	0
North Dakota Agricultural		–		2	–	3	–	0
Miami (OH)		–		2	–	4	–	1
Carthage		–		2	–	4	–	0
Ohio Northern		–		2	–	5	–	0
Iowa State Teachers		–		1	–	4	–	1
Haskell		–		2	–	7	–	0
Heidelberg		–		1	–	7	–	0
Michigan State Normal		–		0	–	5	–	1
Ohio		–		0	–	6	–	1

The 1910 Western State Normal Hilltoppers football team represented Western State Normal School (later renamed Western Michigan University) as an independent during the 1910 college football season. Head coach William H. Spaulding was the head coach. Halfback Alvin Berger was the team captain.

== Schedule ==
Date	Time	Opponent	Site	Result	Attendance	Source
October 8		at Hillsdale	Hillsdale, MI	W 5–3		
October 15		at Albion	Albion, MI	L 0–6		
October 22		at Culver Military Academy	Culver, IN	L 5–22		
October 29	2:00 p.m.	Benton Harbor High School	Woodward Avenue grounds; Kalamazoo, MI	W 16–0	400	
November 4		Central Michigan	Kalamazoo, MI (rivalry)	W 16–6		
November 12		Hope	Holland, MI	W 6–0		

== Players ==
- Alvin Berger, left halfback and captain
- Conklin, right end
- John Damoth, right halfback, Wayland, Michigan
- Charles Anthony Lefevre, center, Kalamazoo
- Martin, left end
- Mayer, fullback
- Howard Russell, right guard, Alamo, Michigan
- Sooy, quarterback
- Van de Walker, right tackle
- Warren, left guard
- Webb, left tackle
- Windoes, right tackle
