= 1910 Central Michigan Normalites football team =

American college football season

1910 Central Michigan Normalites football
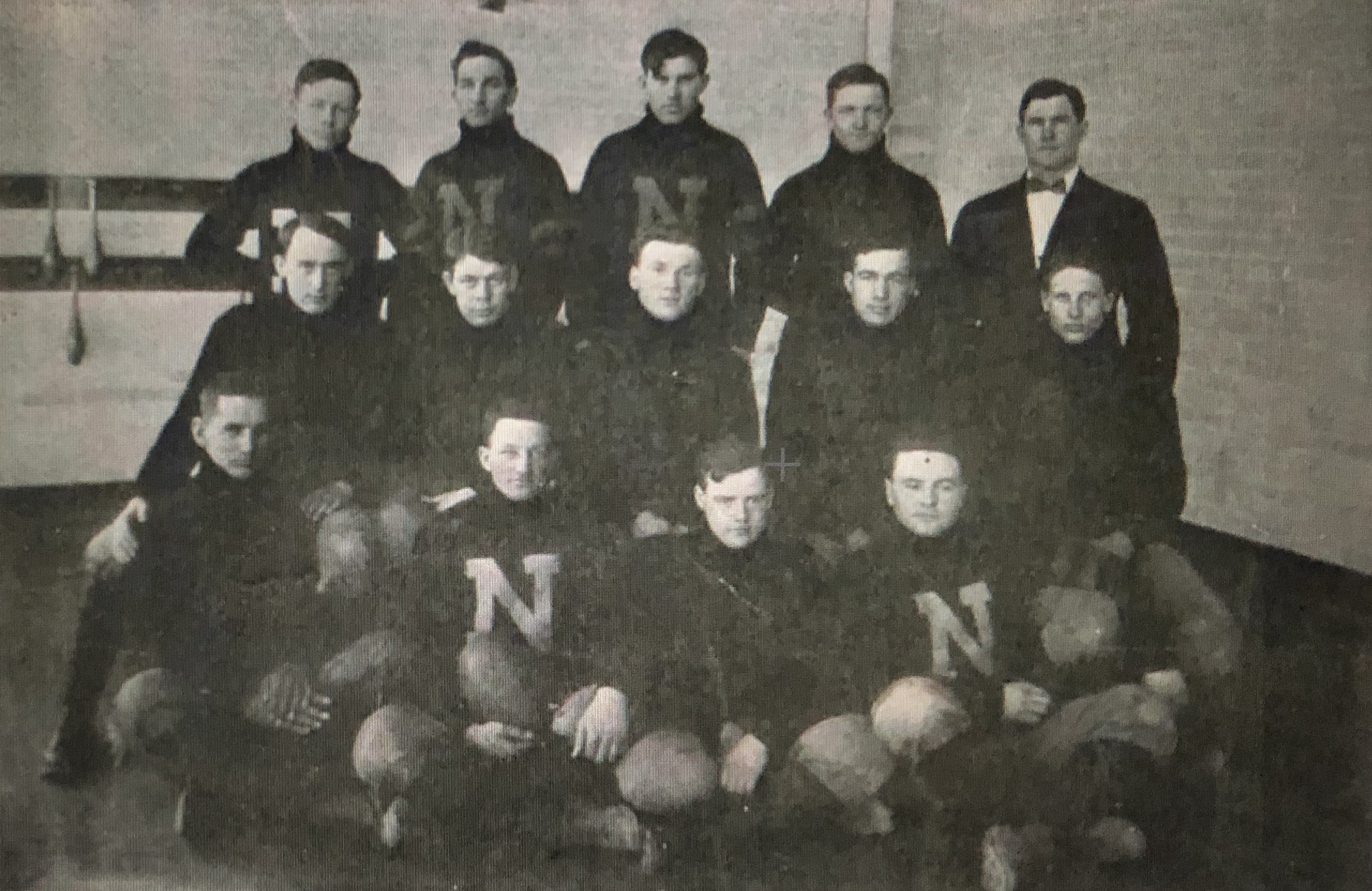
- Conference: Independent
- Record: 5–1–1
- Head coach: Harry Helmer (2nd season)
- Captain: Earl McCarty

1910 Midwestern college football independents records
	Conf.			Overall
Team	W	L	T	W		L		T
Wabash		–		4	–	0	–	0
Michigan Agricultural		–		6	–	1	–	0
St. Mary's (OH)		–		5	–	1	–	0
Central Michigan		–		5	–	1	–	1
Marquette		–		6	–	1	–	2
Notre Dame		–		4	–	1	–	1
Buchtel		–		7	–	2	–	0
Saint Louis		–		7	–	2	–	0
Michigan		–		3	–	0	–	3
Fairmount		–		6	–	2	–	1
Lake Forest		–		5	–	2	–	0
Western State Normal		–		4	–	2	–	0
Northern Illinois State		–		4	–	2	–	1
Mount Union		–		4	–	2	–	2
South Dakota State		–		4	–	2	–	2
Detroit College		–		3	–	2	–	0
Doane		–		3	–	2	–	1
Butler		–		4	–	3	–	1
Rose Poly		–		4	–	4	–	0
North Dakota Agricultural		–		2	–	3	–	0
Miami (OH)		–		2	–	4	–	1
Carthage		–		2	–	4	–	0
Ohio Northern		–		2	–	5	–	0
Iowa State Teachers		–		1	–	4	–	1
Haskell		–		2	–	7	–	0
Heidelberg		–		1	–	7	–	0
Michigan State Normal		–		0	–	5	–	1
Ohio		–		0	–	6	–	1

The 1910 Central Michigan Normalites football team represented Central Michigan Normal School, later renamed Central Michigan University, as an independent during the 1910 college football season. The team compiled a 5–1–1 record, won four of its games by shutouts, and outscored all opponents by a combined total of 106 to 33.

Harry Helmer was Central's head coach in both football and basketball. He was married to Hazel Potter shortly before the start of the 1910 season.

== Schedule ==
Date	Opponent	Site	Result
September	Mt. Pleasant Indians	Mount Pleasant, MI	W 18–0
October 7	at West Branch High School	West Branch, MI	W 6–0
October	Michigan Agricultural reserves		T 6–6
October 29	Flint Mutes	Mount Pleasant, MI	W 40–0
November 4	at Western State Normal (MI)	Kalamazoo, MI (rivalry)	L 6–16
November 12	Michigan State Normal	Mount Pleasant, MI (rivalry)	W 13–0
November	Ferris Institute		W 17–11

== Game summaries ==
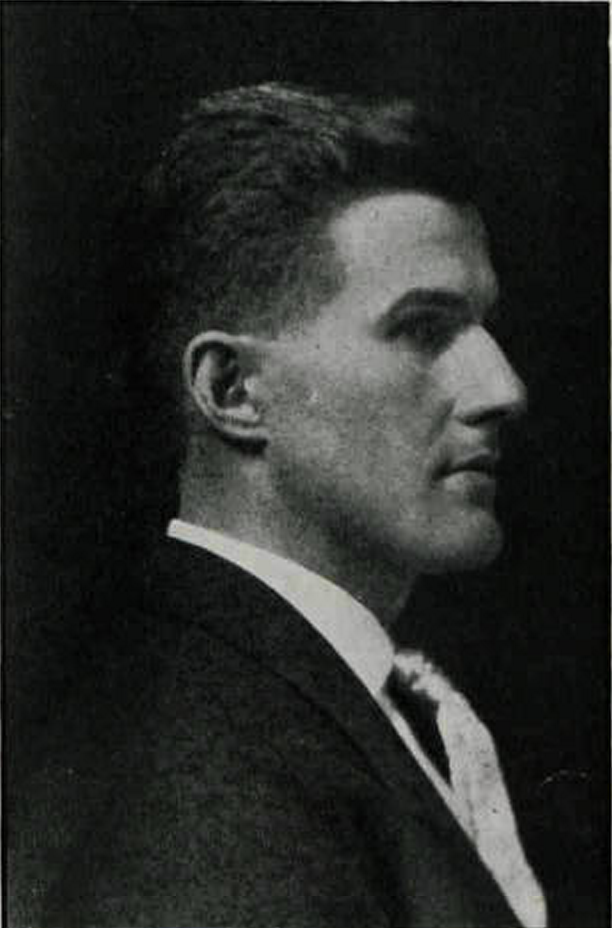
Head coach Harry Helmer

=== Mt. Pleasant Indians ===
Central opened its season with an 18–0 victory over the "Mt. Pleasant Indians". The Indians represented the Mount Pleasant Indian Industrial Boarding School, a boarding school for Native Americans between the ages of 6 and 21, drawn from throughout the State of Michigan. According to one source, the "Mt. Pleasant Indians" drew large crowds when the team traveled, and "the school became a point of pride in Michigan Indian communities, especially when it came to sports where the 'Indians' competed against white teams in basketball and football."

=== West Branch High School ===
On October 10, Central shut out the team from West Branch High School by a 6–0 score in a game played at West Branch. It was common in the early 1900s for college football teams to schedule early-season games (sometimes considered warmup for the major games that were typically played in November) against nearby local high schools. Central had opened its 1909 season with a game against West Branch.

=== Michigan Agricultural reserves ===
Also in October, Central played to a 6–6 tie with the reserves from the 1910 Michigan Agricultural Aggies football team. (Michigan Agricultural was later renamed Michigan State University.) Central had played the Michigan Aggies frosh team once previously, losing in 1909 by a 17-6 score.

=== Flint Mutes ===
On October 29, Central shut out the "Flint Mutes" by a 40–0 score. The Mutes represented the Michigan School for the Deaf located in Flint, Michigan. The school housed and taught deaf students from throughout the State of Michigan between the ages of 7 and 21.

=== Western State ===
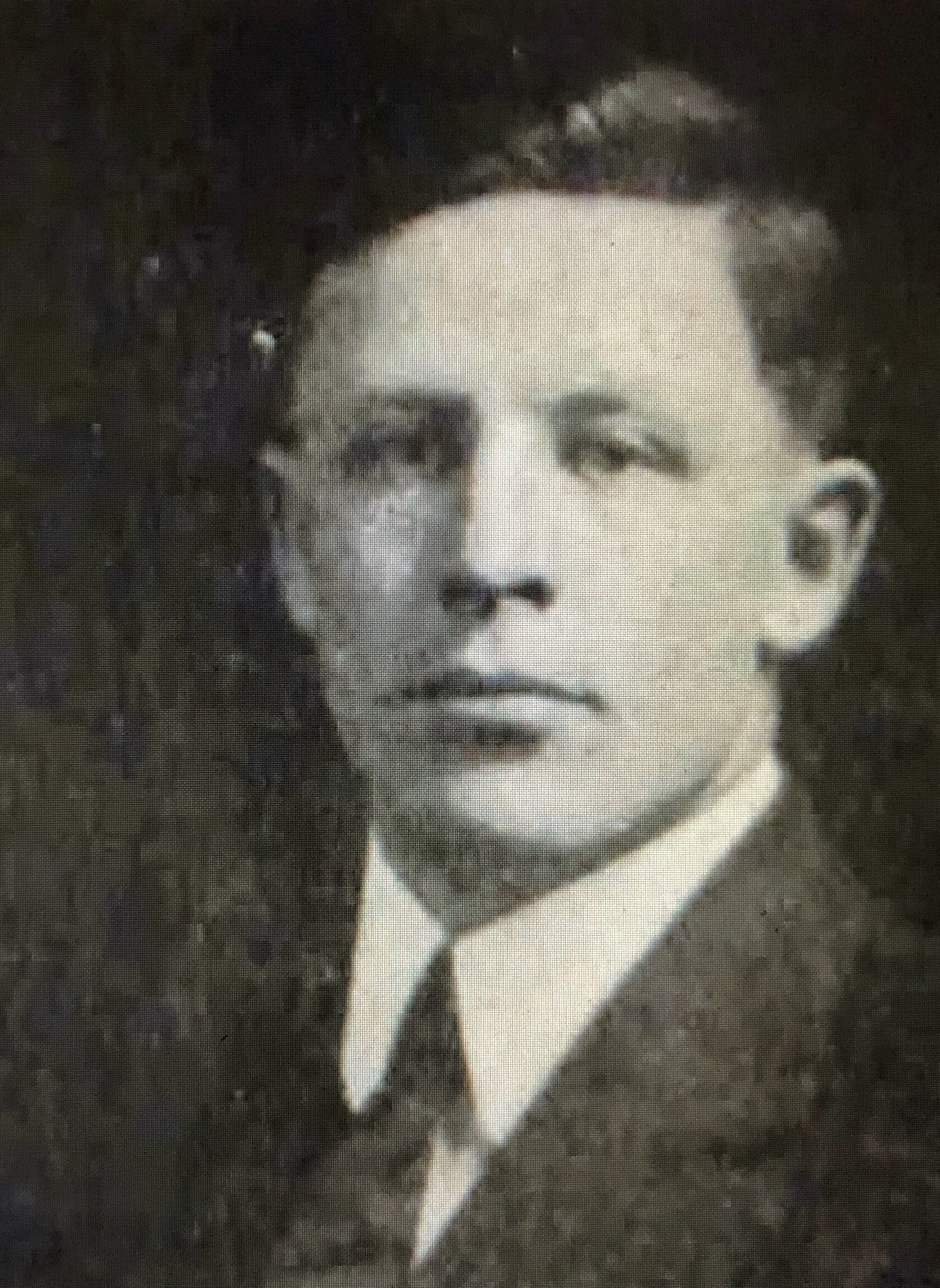
Fullback Emmot Hullihan

On November 4, 1910, Central sustained its sole loss, by a 16 to 6 score, against Western State Normal School (later renamed Western Michigan University). The game was played at Kalamazoo, Michigan, and was the fourth meeting in what became the Central Michigan–Western Michigan football rivalry. Western won the first four games in the series, and after the 1910 game, the rivalry was not resumed until 1925.

With the victory, William H. Spaulding's Western State Hilltoppers became the state normal school champions. The game was described as "one of the hardest and most brilliant games ever played on a local gridiron." Fullback Emmot Hullihan scored a touchdown (worth five points each under 1910 rules) and kicked the extra point for Central in the first quarter. Central led by a 6–5 score at the end of the third quarter, but Western scored two touchdowns and an extra point in the fourth quarter. Central had the ball on Western's six-yard line when time was called.

=== Michigan State Normal ===
On November 12, in the season's other rivalry game, Central Michigan defeated Michigan State Normal School (later renamed Eastern Michigan University), 13–0. Emmot Hullihan intercepted a pass and returned it for a touchdown and also kicked a field goal. Tackle Orlo Dickerson also recovered a punt and returned it 10 yards for Central's second touchdown.

=== Elsie Giants ===
The Central Michigan football media guide also includes reference to a victory over the Elsie Giants. The Elsie Giants were a football team from Elsie, Michigan, with origins dating back to 1901. According to the media guide, the Central Michigan football team played four matches against the Giants between 1903 and 1910. However, the 1911 Central Michigan yearbook, in reporting the results of the 1910 season, does not include a game with the Elsie Giants.

== Roster ==
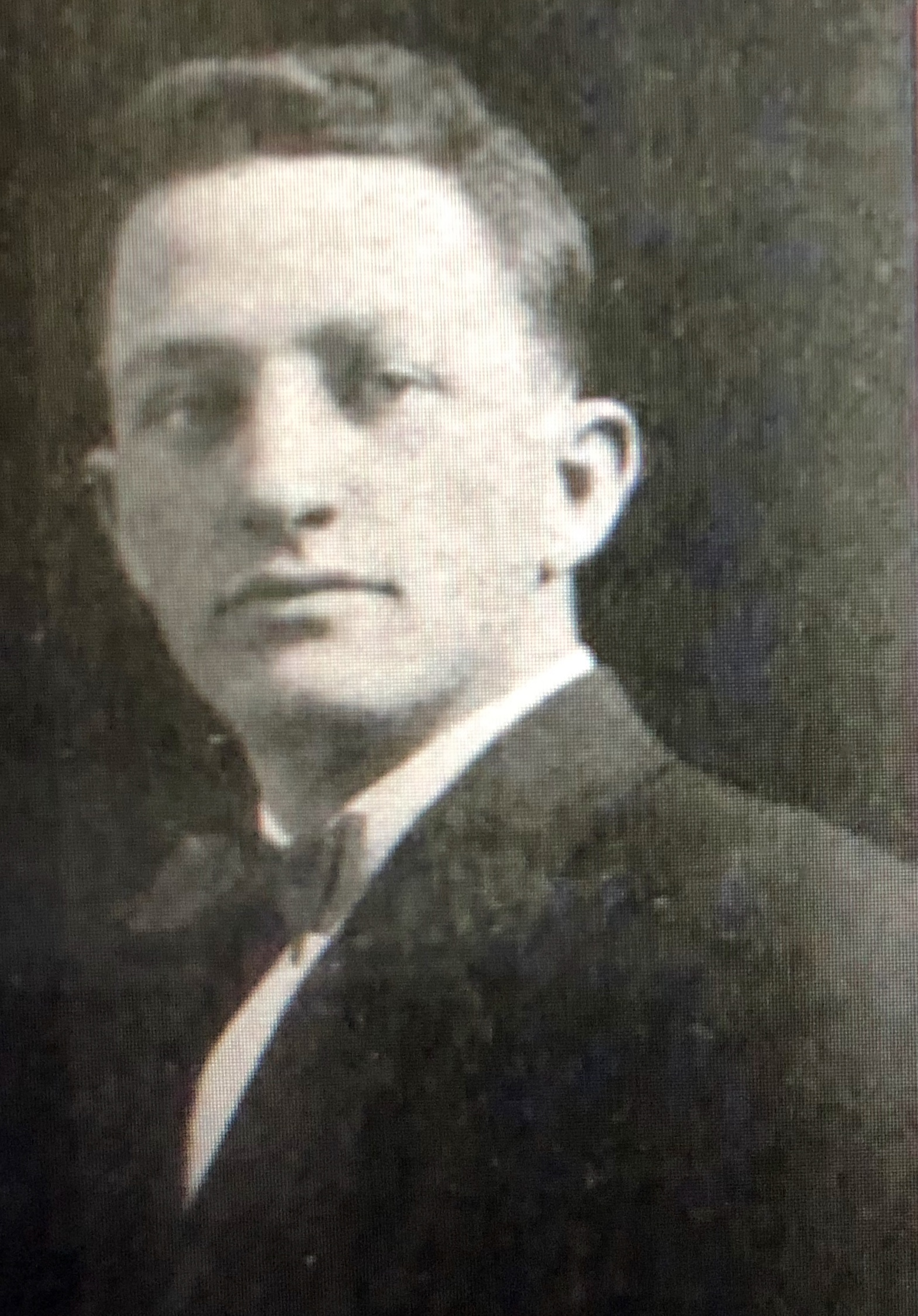
Earl McCarty, 1910 team captain

The following individuals were members of Central Michigan's 1910 football team.

- Clyde J. Bollinger, guard, Lakeview, Michigan
- Ford Bradish, tackle, Mt. Pleasant, Michigan
- Charles Crandell, right end, Mt. Pleasant, Michigan
- Isaac Crawford, center, Rosebush, Michigan
- Orlo R. Dickerson, tackle, Mt. Pleasant, Michigan
- Leo Going, guard and tackle
- Emmot Hullihan, fullback, Mt. Pleasant, Michigan
- George T. Lusk, halfback, Elsie, Michigan
- Earl McCarty, right halfback and captain, Bad Axe, Michigan
- Thomas McNamara, quarterback
- Ollie Richards, left halfback
- Cecil Tuck, guard, Coral, Michigan
- Clayton Wyse, guard
