= Shorty McMillan =

American football player (1890–1964)

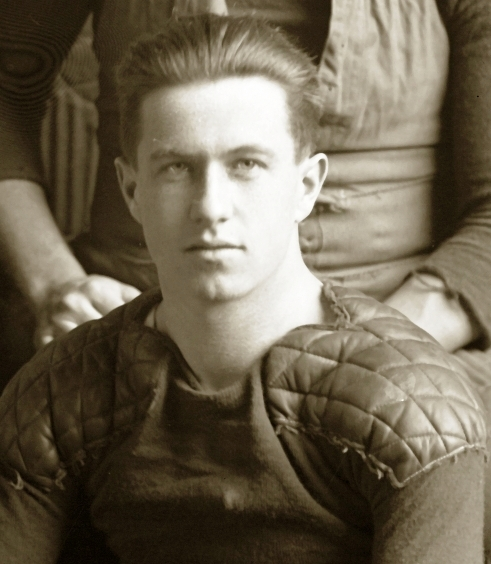

Playing career
- 1910–1911: Michigan
- Position: Quarterback

Neil "Shorty" McMillan (September 10, 1890 – October 1964) was an American football quarterback for the University of Michigan from 1910–1911.

== Playing career ==
A native of Detroit, Michigan, McMillan enrolled at the University of Michigan in 1909 and led the freshman football team to an undefeated season, leading to high expectations for the 1910 team under his leadership.

McMillan started all six games for Michigan in the 1910 season in which the Wolverines went undefeated but also played in three tie games for a final record of 3–0–3. In his first year of college football, McMillan developed a reputation as an "exceptional quarter back", and Michigan's head coach Fielding H. Yost said "he never had a man handle the work in that position as well as did McMillan in his first year." His accomplishments were considered all the more impressive when it was discovered that he had played the hardest home games of the 1910 season with a broken shoulder. McMillan was credited with a tough performance in Michigan's scoreless tie with Penn. The Philadelphia Inquirer reported: "Little McMillan was hurt several times, but he always 'came back.'" In the final game of the 1910 season, Michigan defeated Minnesota 6 to 0, as "two beautifully executed forward passes" from McMillan to left end Stanley Borleske won the game for Michigan.

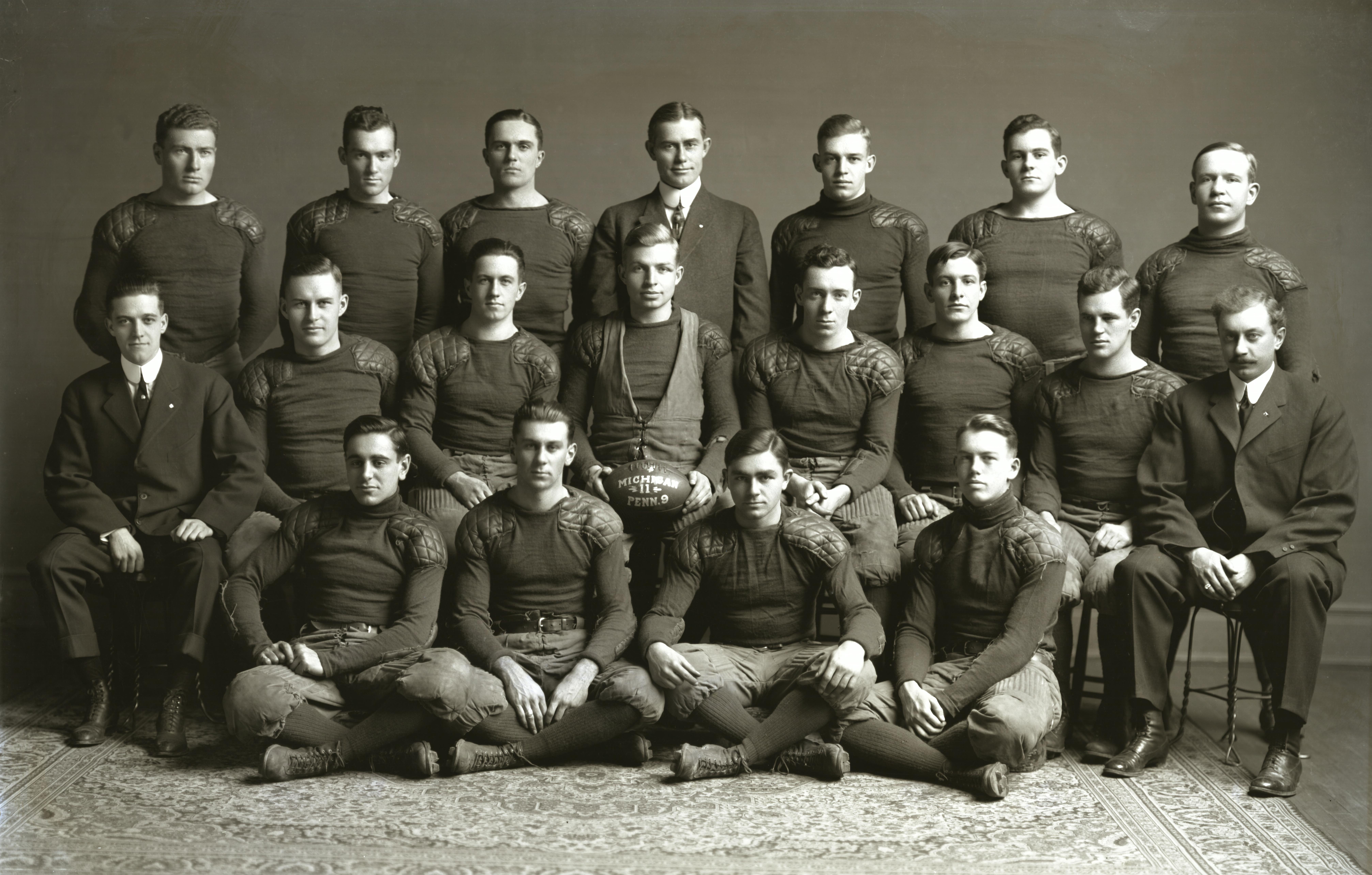
1911 Michigan Wolverines football team

Prior to the start of the 1911 football season, there were doubts as to whether McMillan would return, as he considered quitting college to work in his father's office in Detroit. McMillan did return to Michigan and was given the starting quarterback job. He led the Wolverines to a 4–0 record in the first four games of the season, outscoring the opposition 67 to 11, including a 19–0 shutout against Ohio State. However, McMillan sustained a dislocated knee during a practice scrimmage in early November 1911, and James Craig was forced to take over at the quarterback spot. A newspaper report in late November indicated that McMillan was still on the "hospital list" with a "badly bruised side." Without McMillan in the starting lineup, the Wolverines went 1–1–2 in the final four games of the season.

In a career shortened by injury, McMillan started only ten games at quarterback, but never lost a game he started. The Wolverines' record in games with McMillan as the starting quarterback was 7–0–3.
