= 1909 All-Eastern football team =

American all-star college football team

The 1909 All-Eastern football team consists of American football players chosen by various selectors as the best players at each position among the Eastern colleges and universities during the 1909 college football season.

== All-Eastern selections ==
=== Quarterbacks ===
- Earl Sprackling, Brown (PP-2; YDN-1)
- Larry Vorhis, Penn State (PP-1)
- Frank Bergin, Princeton (YDN-2)

=== Halfbacks ===
- Stephen Philbin, Yale (PP-1; YDN-1)
- Ted Coy, Yale (PP-1; YDN-1)
- Hamilton Corbett, Harvard (PP-2; YDN-2)
- White, Fordham (PP-2)
- Fred J. Murphy, Yale (YDN-2)

=== Fullbacks ===
- Wayland Minot, Harvard (PP-1; YDN-1)
- John L. Marks, Dartmouth (YDN-2)
- George McCrea, Lafayette (PP-2)

=== Ends ===
- John Kilpatrick, Yale (PP-1; YDN-1)
- Adrian Regnier, Brown (PP-1; YDN-2)
- Harry Vaughan, Yale (YDN-1)
- Harry Braddock, Penn (PP-2)
- Lawrence Dunlap Smith, Harvard (PP-2)
- Walter Logan, Yale (YDN-2)

=== Tackles ===
- Hamilton Fish III, Harvard (PP-1; YDN-1)
- Henry Hobbs, Yale (PP-1)
- Daniel Pullen, Army (YDN-1)
- Theodore Lilley, Yale (PP-2; YDN-2)
- James Russell McKay, Brown (YDN-2)
- Rudy Siegling, Princeton (PP-2)

=== Guards ===
- Hamlin Andrus, Yale (PP-1; YDN-1)
- Clark Tobin, Dartmouth (PP-1; YDN-1)
- William Goebel, Yale (PP-2; YDN-2)
- Lothrop Withington, Harvard (YDN-2)
- Bob Fisher, Harvard (PP-2)

=== Centers ===
- Carroll Cooney, Yale (PP-1; YDN-1)
- Ernest Cozens, Penn (PP-2)
- Paul Withington, Harvard (YDN-2)

== Key ==
- YDN = Yale Daily News
- PP = Pittsburgh Press
- SUN = The Sun

== See also ==
- 1909 College Football All-America Team
