= Yale Bulldogs football =

American university football team

2026 Yale Bulldogs football team
- First season: 1872; 154 years ago
- Athletic director: Victoria Chun
- Head coach: Kevin Cahill; 1st season, 5–4 (.556)
- Location: New Haven, Connecticut
- Stadium: Yale Bowl (capacity: 61,446)
- Conference: Ivy League
- Colors: Yale blue and white
- All-time record: 952–396–55 (.698)

National championships
- Claimed: 1872, 1874, 1876, 1877, 1879, 1880, 1881, 1882, 1883, 1884, 1886, 1887, 1888, 1891, 1892, 1893, 1894, 1895, 1897, 1900, 1901, 1902, 1905, 1906, 1907, 1909, 1927

Conference championships
- Ivy League: 1956, 1960, 1967, 1968, 1969, 1974, 1976, 1977, 1979, 1980, 1981, 1989, 1999, 2006, 2017, 2019, 2022, 2023, 2025
- Heisman winners: Larry Kelley – 1936; Clint Frank – 1937
- Consensus All-Americans: 100
- Rivalries: Harvard (rivalry); Princeton (rivalry)

Uniforms
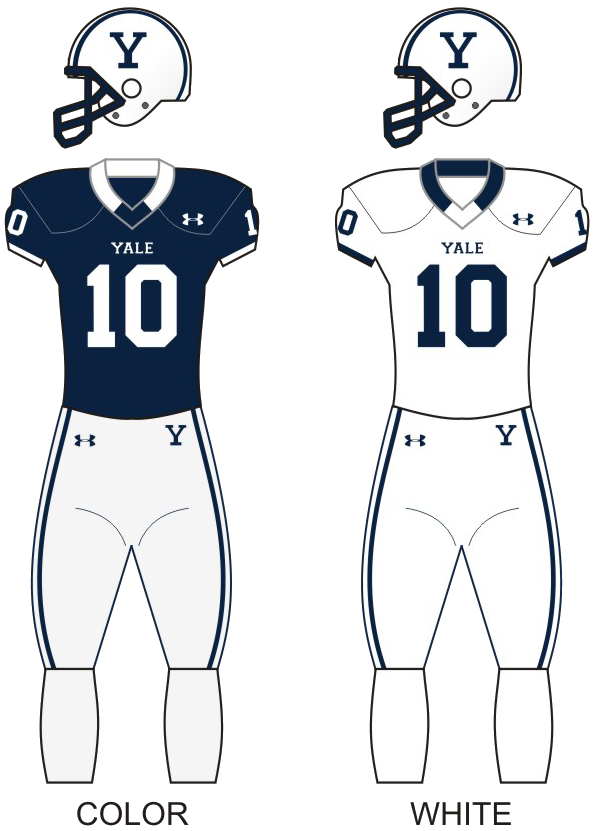
- Fight song: "Down the Field"
- Mascot: Handsome Dan
- Website: yalebulldogs.com

The Yale Bulldogs football program represents Yale University in college football in the NCAA Division I Football Championship Subdivision (formerly Division I-AA). Yale's football program, founded in 1872, is one of the oldest in the world. Since their founding, the Bulldogs have won 27 national championships, two of the first three Heisman Trophy winners (Larry Kelley in 1936 and Clint Frank in 1937), 100 consensus All-Americans, 28 College Football Hall of Fame inductees, including the "Father of American Football" Walter Camp, the first professional football player Pudge Heffelfinger, and coaching giants Amos Alonzo Stagg, Howard Jones, Tad Jones and Carmen Cozza. With over 900 wins, Yale ranks in the top ten for most wins in college football history.

== History ==
=== Early history ===
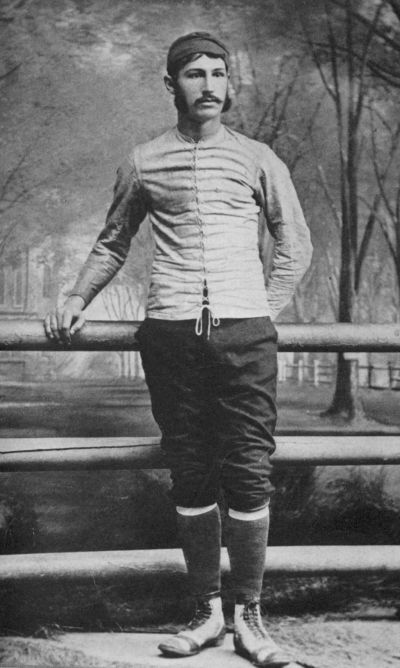
Walter Camp, the "Father of American Football", as Yale's captain in 1878

The Bulldogs were the dominant team in the early days of intercollegiate football, winning 27 college football national championships, including 26 in 38 years between 1872 and 1909. Walter Camp, known as the "Father of Football", graduated from Hopkins Grammar School in 1876, and played college football at Yale College from 1876 to 1882. He later served as the head football coach at Yale from 1888 to 1892. It was Camp who pioneered the fundamental transition of American football from rugby when in 1880, he succeeded in convincing the Intercollegiate Football Association to discontinue the rugby "scrum", and instead have players line up along a "line of scrimmage" for individual plays, which begin with the snap of the ball and conclude with the tackling of the ballcarrier. In 1916, against the advisement of coach Tad Jones, Yale quarterback Chester J. LaRoche (1918s) helped lead the Yale team in a win against Princeton by turning the momentum of the game with a fourth-down call in the huddle to go for first down rather than punt. The team made the down and went on to win the game in one of Yale's greatest victories in its history. LaRoche went on to spearhead the creation of the National Football Foundation and Hall of Fame.

By the 1940s, however, Yale's success in football had waned at the national level. The famed sportswriter Grantland Rice wrote that Yale, along with Harvard and Princeton, was one of the top teams in the late 19th and early 20th century. However, "It was has been a different story in the later years when the far west, the midwest, the southwest, and the south have taken charge as Harvard, Yale, and Princeton fell behind."

=== Formation of the Ivy League ===
When the Ivy League athletic conference was formed in 1955, conference rules prohibited post-season play in football. While Yale had always abstained from post-season play, other member schools had participated in bowls before, and the new policy further insulated Yale and the Ivy League from the national spotlight. In 2024, the Ivy presidents voted to allow Ivy League football teams to take part in NCAA FCS post-season play. Yale claimed the league's first-ever automatic bid to the NCAA FCS playoffs in 2025 by "dominat[ing]" then-undefeated Harvard in a 45–28 win in the final regular season game.

=== NCAA Division I subdivision split ===
The NCAA decided to split Division I into two subdivisions in 1978, then called I-A for larger schools, and I-AA for the smaller ones. The NCAA had devised the split, in part, with the Ivy League in mind, but the conference did not move down for four seasons despite the fact that there were many indications that the ancient eight were on the wrong side of an increasing disparity between the big and small schools. In 1982, the NCAA created a rule that stated a program's average attendance must be at least 15,000 to qualify for I-A membership. This forced the conference's hand, as only some of the member schools met the attendance qualification. Choosing to stay together rather than stand their ground separately in the increasingly competitive I-A subdivision, the Ivy League moved down into I-AA starting with the 1982 season. In 2024, the Ivy presidents voted to allow football to compete in the NCAA post-season. By virtue of an upset win over then-undefeated Harvard in fall 2025, Yale received the first-ever Ivy League automatic bid to NCAA football FCS post-season play. On November 29, 2025, The Bulldogs defeated Youngstown State 43–42 for its first ever win in the NCAA Division I FCS playoffs, coming back after being down 35–7 at halftime. Yale would outscore Youngstown State 36–7 in the second half. Josh Pitsenberger rushed for 209 yards on 32 carries and Dante Reno would pass for 260 yards with three touchdown passes. Three different receivers accounted for the touchdowns and two of the three receivers caught one pass in the contest. Yale would lose its next playoff game 21–13 to Montana State on the victor’s homefield.

== Conference affiliations ==
Yale has been both an independent and affiliated with the Ivy League.

- Independent (1872–1955)
- Ivy League (1956–present)

== Championships ==
=== National championships ===
Yale has won 27 national championships from NCAA-designated major selectors.

Photographs of Yale
national champion teams

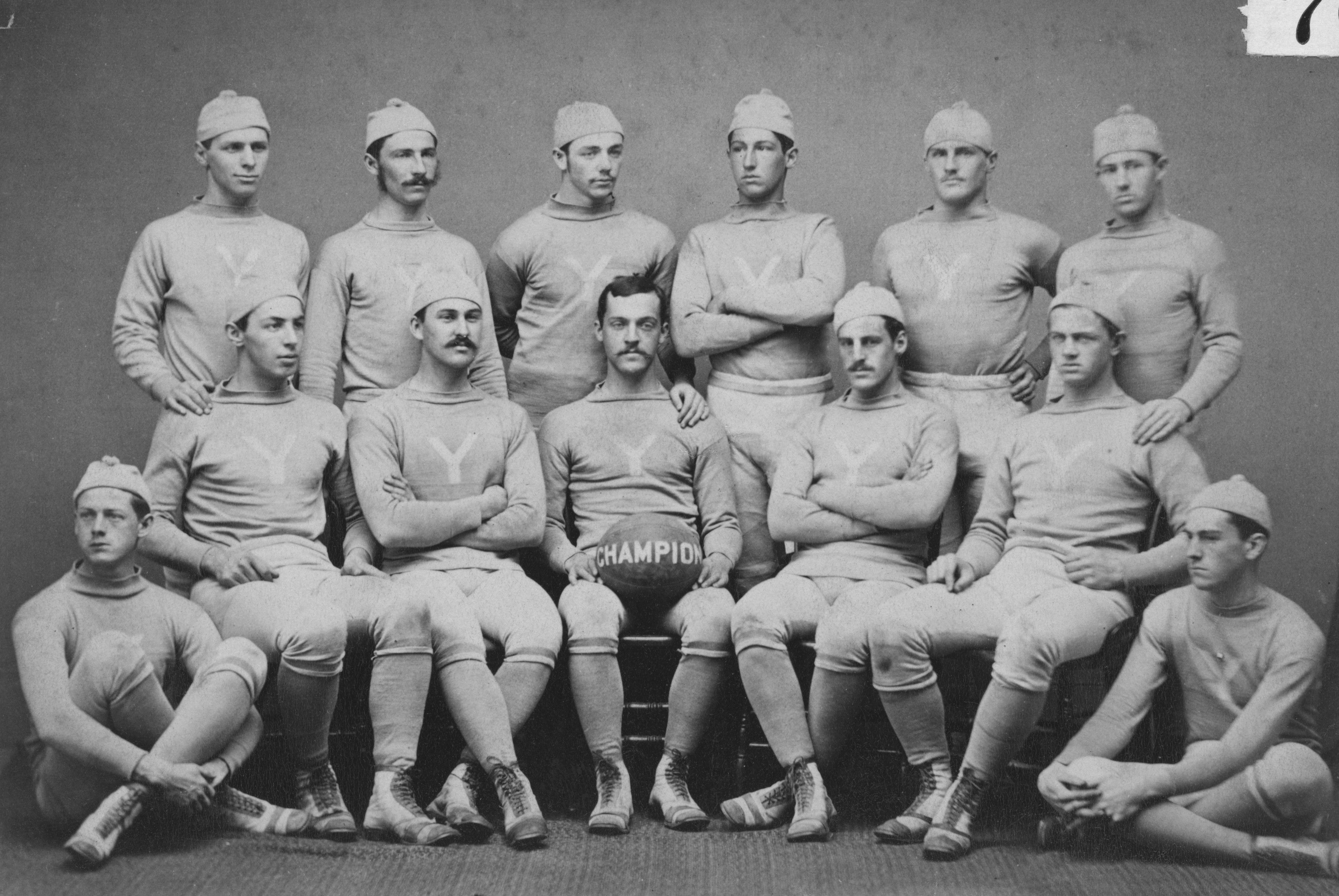
1876

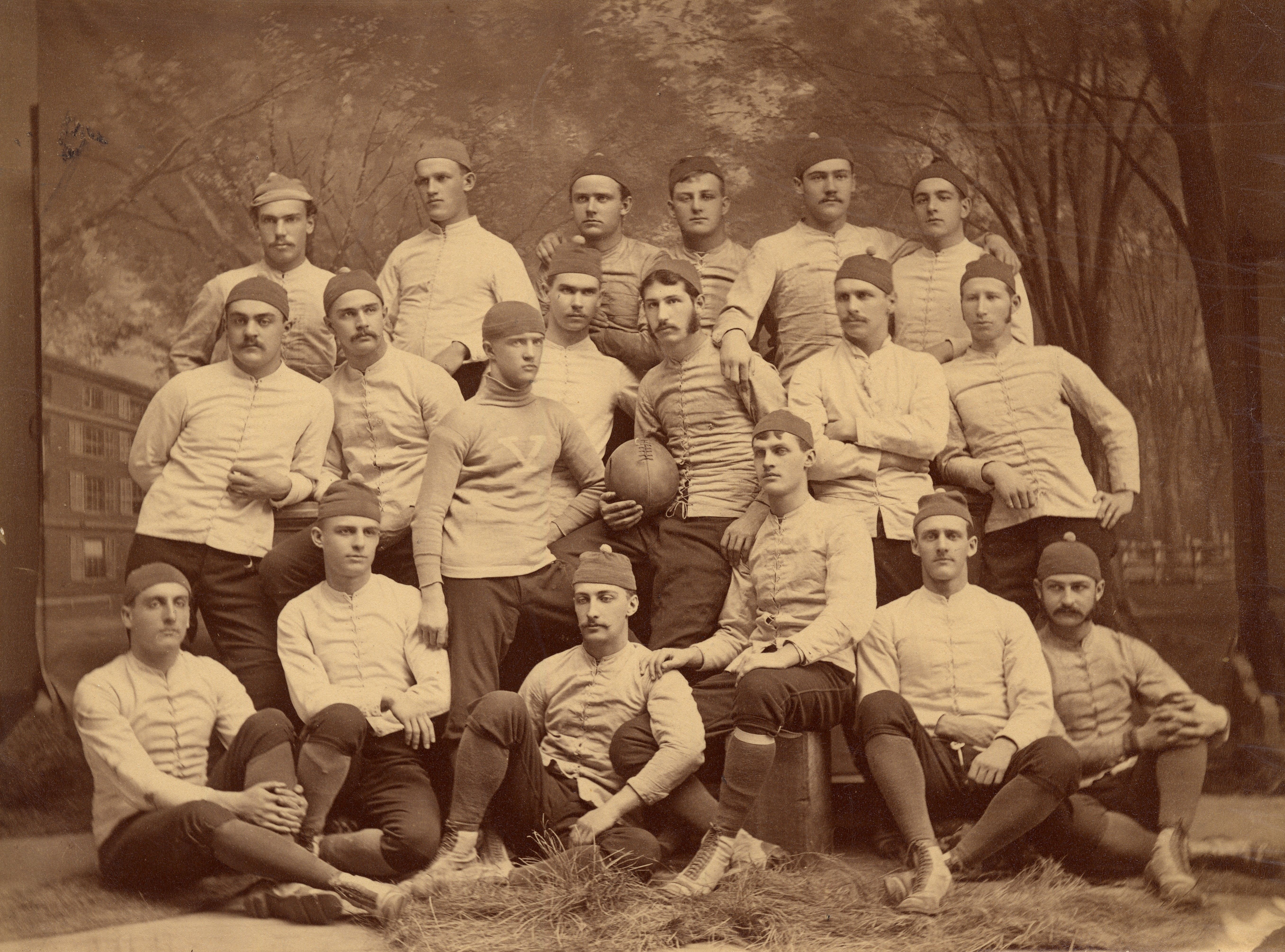
1879

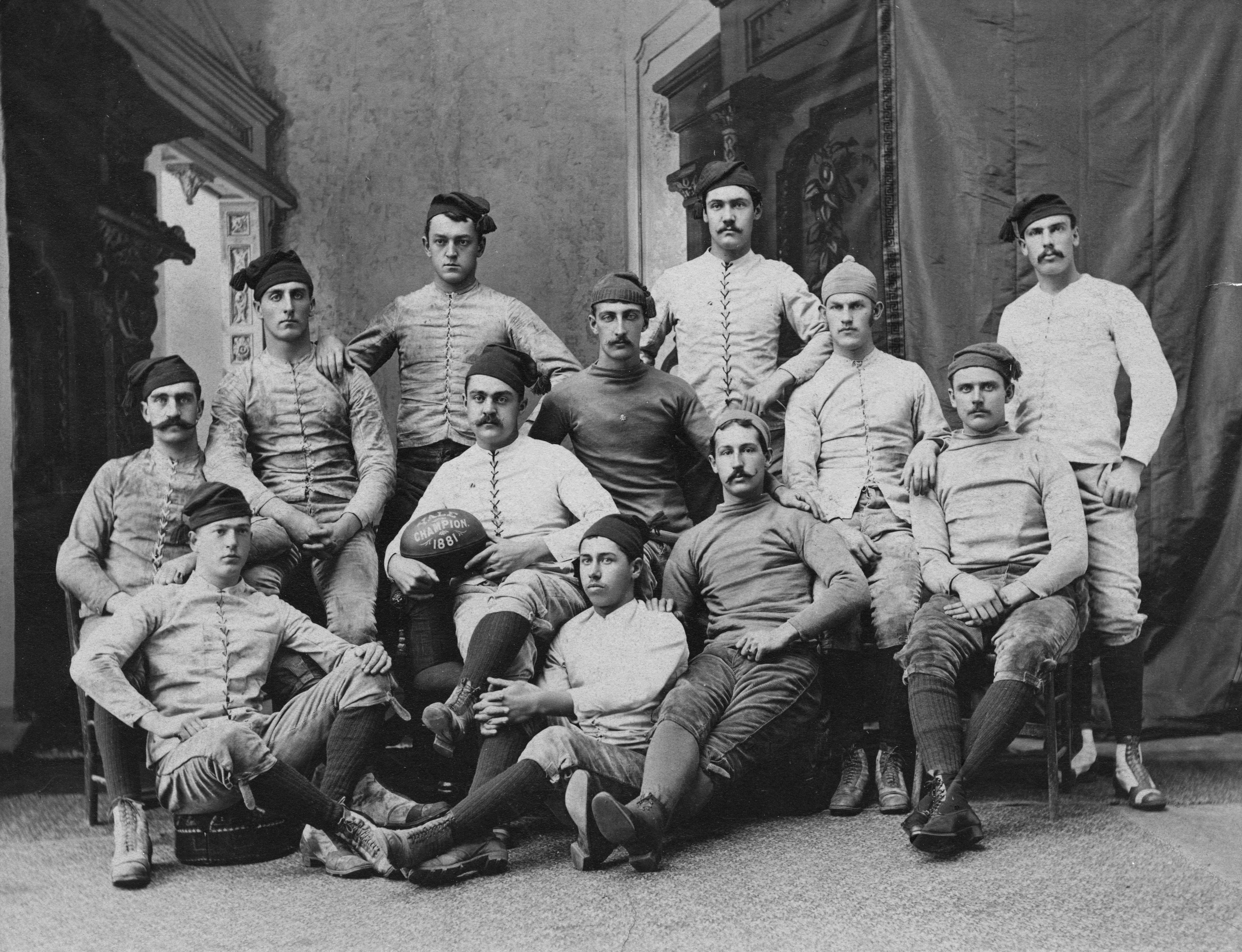
1881

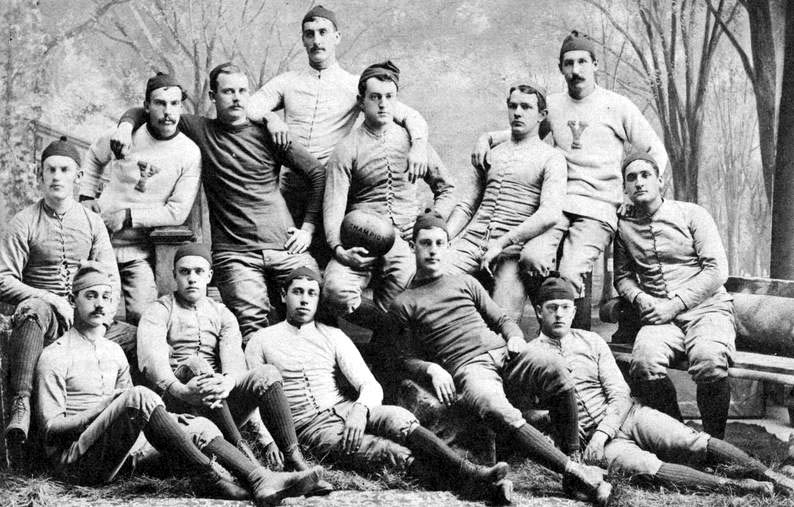
1882

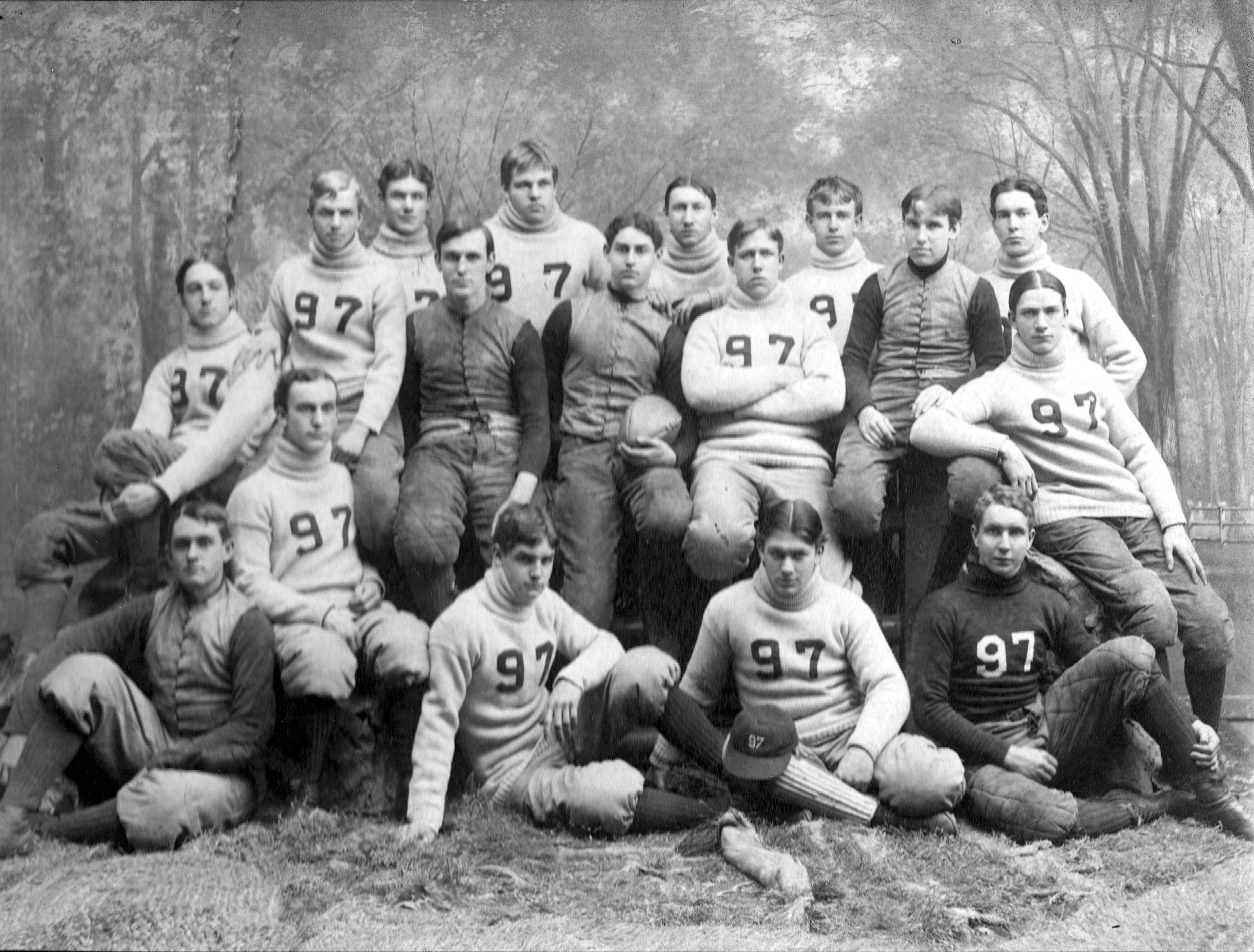
1897

Season	Coach	Selectors	Record
1872	No coach	Parke Davis	1–0
1874	No coach	National Championship Foundation, Parke Davis	3–0
1876	No coach	Billingsley, National Championship Foundation, Parke Davis	3–0
1877	No coach	Billingsley, National Championship Foundation, Parke Davis	3–0–1
1879	No coach	Parke Davis	3–0–2
1880	No coach	Billingsley, National Championship Foundation, Parke Davis	4–0–1
1881	No coach	National Championship Foundation, Parke Davis	5–0–1
1882	No coach	Billingsley, National Championship Foundation, Parke Davis	8–0
1883	No coach	Billingsley, Helms, National Championship Foundation, Parke Davis	9–0
1884	No coach	Billingsley, Helms, National Championship Foundation, Parke Davis	8–0–1
1886	No coach	Billingsley, Helms, National Championship Foundation, Parke Davis	9–0–1
1887	No coach	Billingsley, Helms, Houlgate, National Championship Foundation, Parke Davis	9–0
1888	Walter Camp	Billingsley, Helms, Houlgate, National Championship Foundation, Parke Davis	13–0
1891	Walter Camp	Billingsley, Helms, Houlgate, National Championship Foundation, Parke Davis	13–0
1892	Walter Camp	Billingsley, Helms, Houlgate, National Championship Foundation, Parke Davis	13–0
1893	William Rhodes	Parke Davis	10–1
1894	William Rhodes	Billingsley, Helms, National Championship Foundation, Parke Davis	16–0
1895	John A. Hartwell	Parke Davis	13–0–2
1897	Frank Butterworth	Parke Davis	9–0–2
1900	Malcolm McBride	Billingsley, Helms, Houlgate, National Championship Foundation, Parke Davis	12–0
1901	George S. Stillman	n/a (Note: Parke Davis' selection for 1901, as published in Spalding's Foot Ball Guide (to which he was a contributor until his death) for 1934 and 1935, was Harvard.) (Note: The NCAA Record Book states "Yale" for 1901, which is an error that has been perpetuated since the first appearance of Parke Davis' selections in the NCAA book about 1995.)	11–1–1
1902	Joseph R. Swan	Parke Davis	11–0–1
1905	Jack Owsley	Parke Davis, Whitney	10–0
1906	Foster Rockwell	Billingsley, Parke Davis, Whitney	9–0–1
1907	William F. Knox	Billingsley, Helms, Houlgate, National Championship Foundation, Parke Davis, Whitney	9–0–1
1909	Howard Jones	Billingsley, Helms, Houlgate, National Championship Foundation, Parke Davis	10–0
1927	Mal Stevens	Football Research	7–1

=== Conference championships ===
Yale has won 19 conference championships, all in the Ivy League, as of 2025 with nine outright and ten shared. In 2025, Yale's upset victory over Harvard in The Game gave Yale a share of the Ivy title and, by virtue of the head-to-head win over the Crimson, the first automatic bid to the NCAA Division I FCS tournament in Ivy League football history.

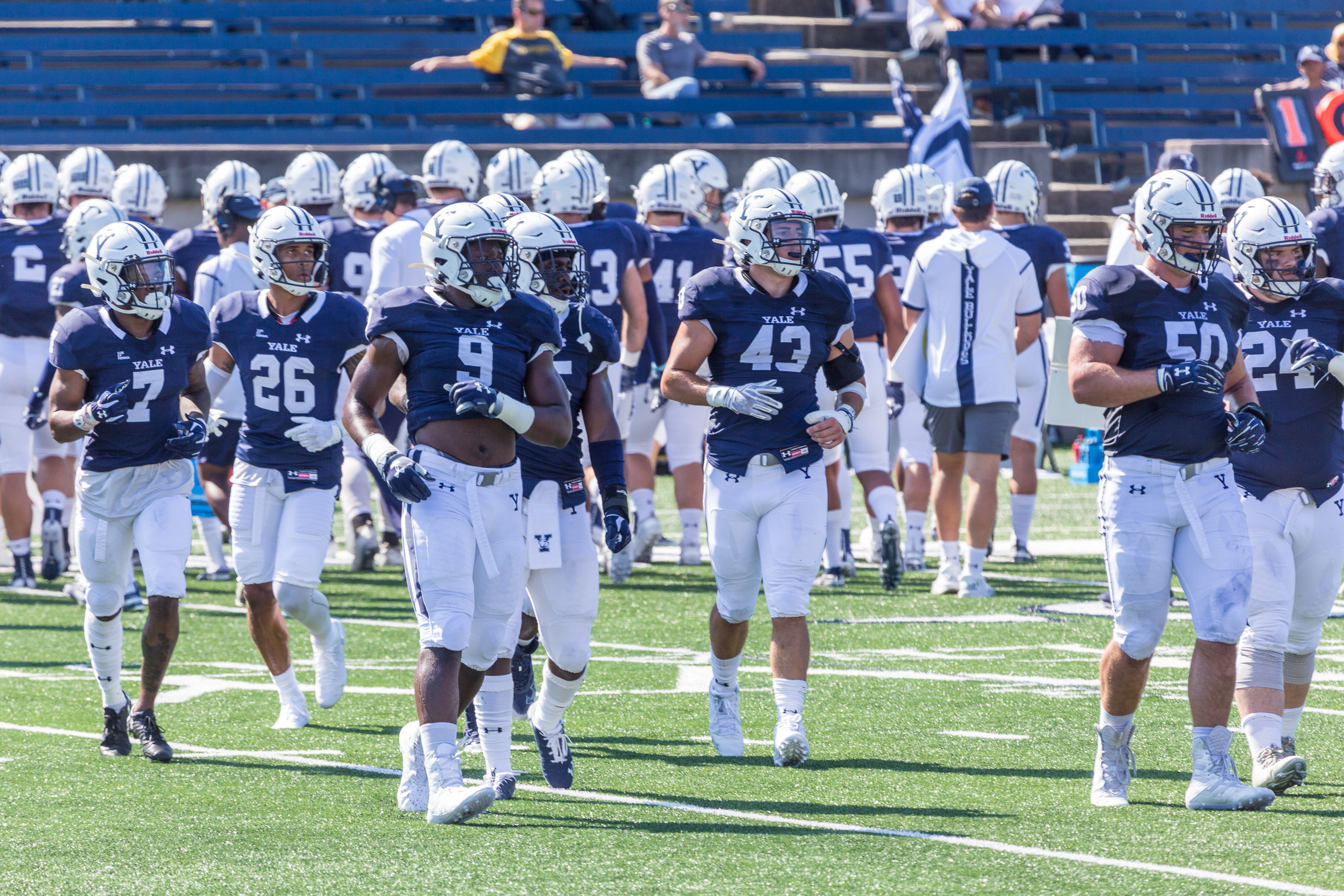
2019 Yale Bulldogs

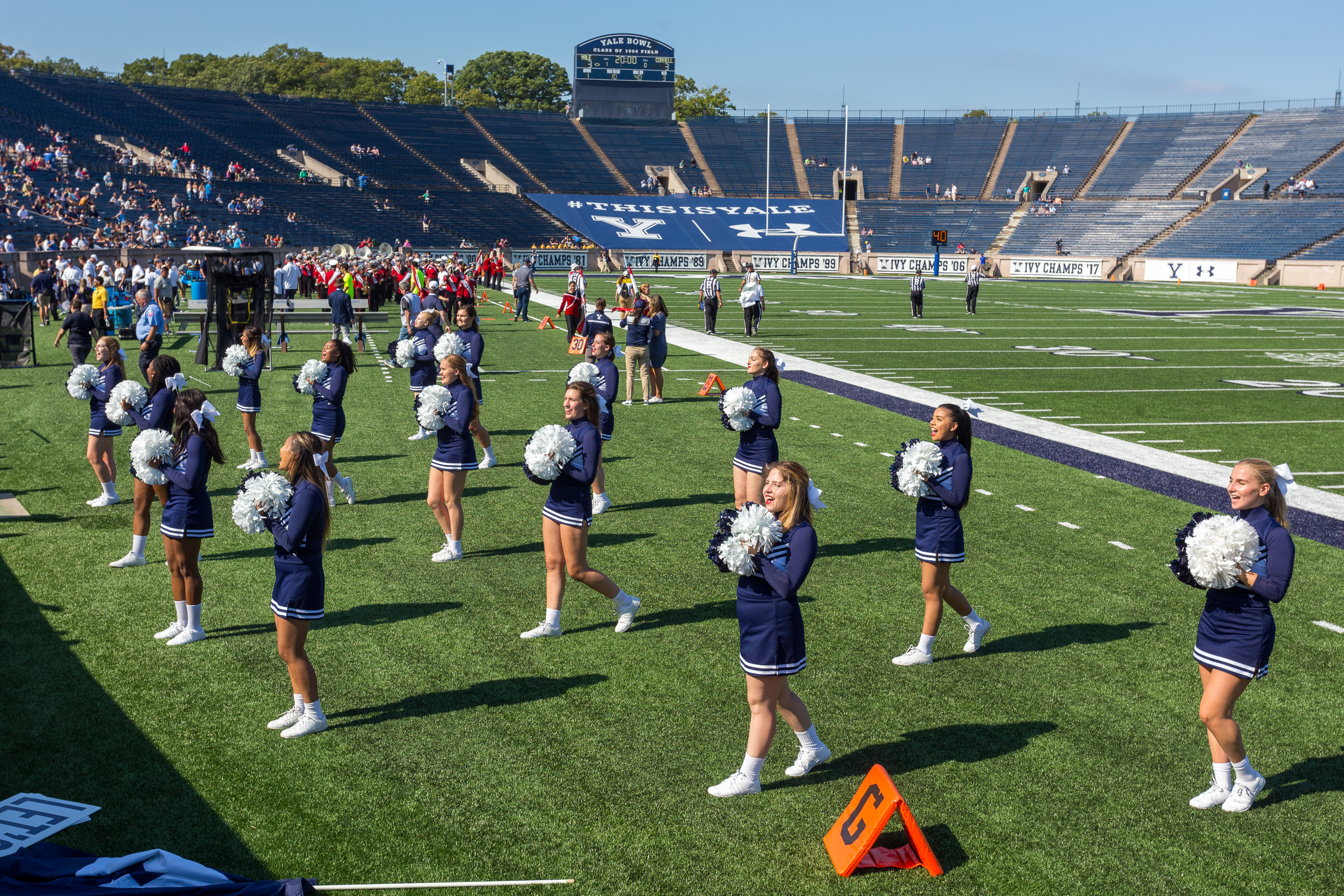
Yale cheerleaders at the Yale/Cornell Football game at Yale Bowl, September 28, 2019.

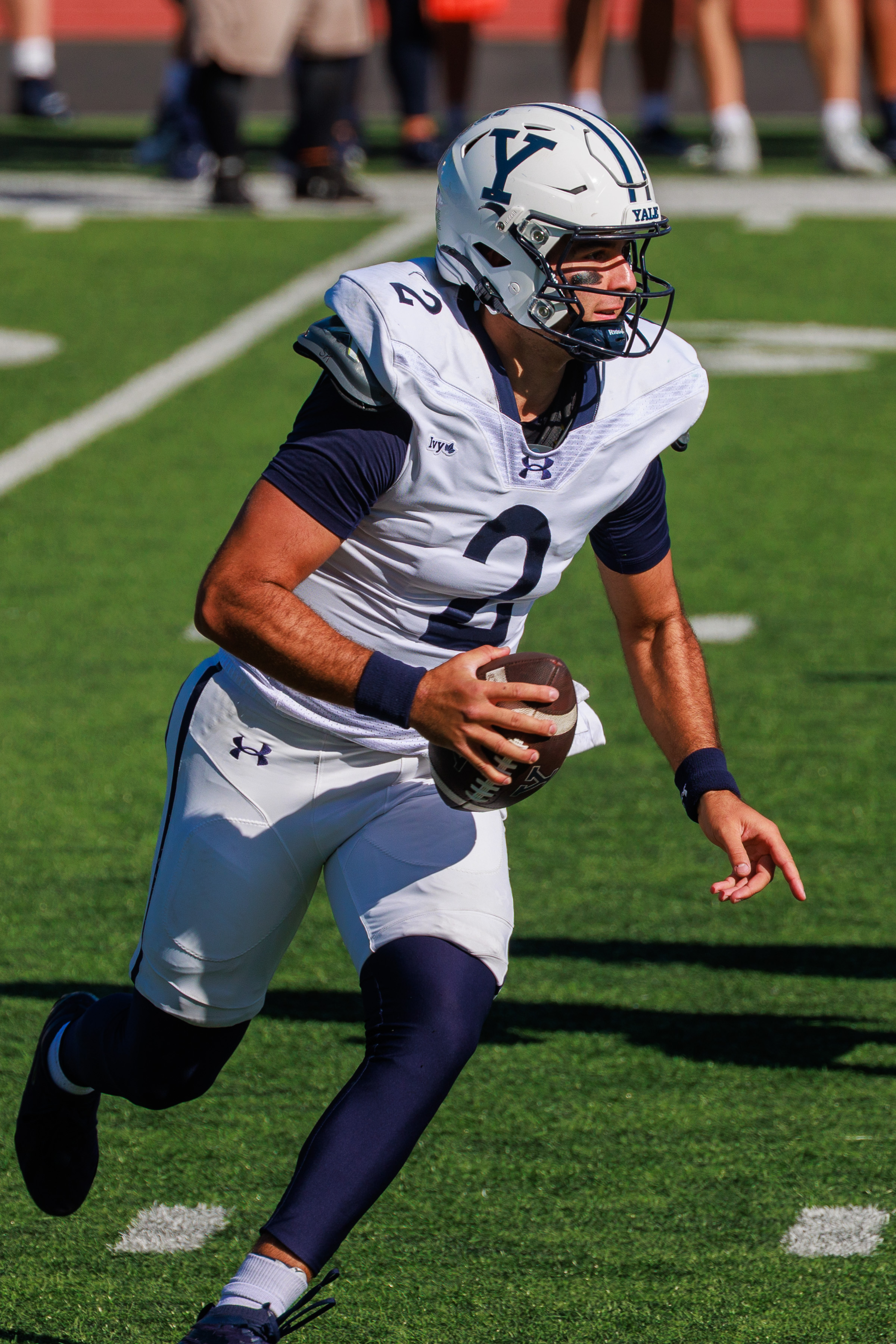
Dante Reno

Year	Conference	Coach	Overall record	Conference record
1956	Ivy League	Jordan Olivar	8–1	7–0
1960	Ivy League	Jordan Olivar	9–0	7–0
1967	Ivy League	Carmen Cozza	8–1	7–0
1968	Ivy League	Carmen Cozza	8–0–1	6–0–1
1969†	Ivy League	Carmen Cozza	7–2	6–1
1974†	Ivy League	Carmen Cozza	8–1	6–1
1976†	Ivy League	Carmen Cozza	8–1	6–1
1977	Ivy League	Carmen Cozza	7–2	6–1
1979	Ivy League	Carmen Cozza	8–1	6–1
1980	Ivy League	Carmen Cozza	8–2	6–1
1981†	Ivy League	Carmen Cozza	9–1	6–1
1989†	Ivy League	Carmen Cozza	8–2	6–1
1999†	Ivy League	Jack Siedlecki	9–1	6–1
2006†	Ivy League	Jack Siedlecki	8–2	6–1
2017	Ivy League	Tony Reno	9–1	6–1
2019†	Ivy League	Tony Reno	9–1	6–1
2022	Ivy League	Tony Reno	8–2	6–1
2023†	Ivy League	Tony Reno	7–3	5–2
2025†	Ivy League	Tony Reno	9–3	6–1

† Co-championship

== Postseason ==
=== NCAA Division I-AA/FCS playoffs ===
The Bulldogs have made one appearance in the Division I-AA/FCS Playoffs, with a combined record of 1–1.

Year	Round	Opponent	Result
2025	First Round; Second Round	@ Youngstown State @ Montana State	W 43–42; L 13–21

== Head coaches ==
Career records of Yale head coaches:

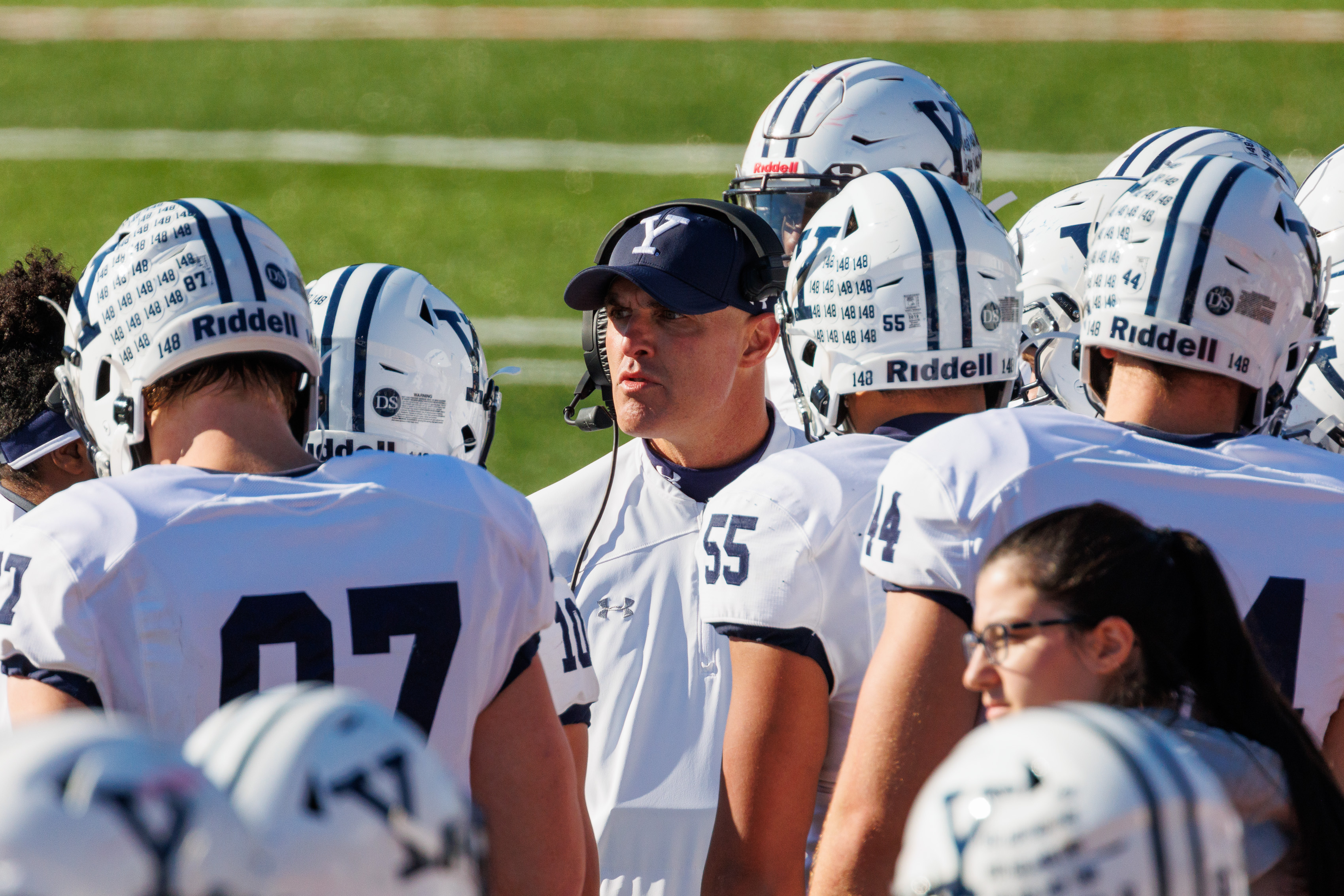
Coach Tony Reno confers with players in November 2021

Coach	Years	Record	Pct.
No coach	1872–1887	79–5–8	.902
Walter Camp	1888–1892	67–2–0	.971
William Rhodes	1893–1894	26–1–0	.963
John A. Hartwell	1895	13–0–2	.933
Sam Thorne	1896	13–1–0	.929
Frank Butterworth	1897–1898	18–2–2	.864
James O. Rodgers	1899	7–2–1	.750
Malcolm McBride	1900	12–0–0	1.000
George S. Stillman	1901	11–1–1	.885
Joseph R. Swan	1902	11–0–1	.958
George B. Chadwick	1903	11–1–0	.917
Charles D. Rafferty	1904	10–1–0	.909
Jack Owsley	1905	10–0–0	1.000
Foster Rockwell	1906	9–0–1	.950
William F. Knox	1907	9–0–1	.950
Lucius Horatio Biglow	1908	7–1–1	.833
Howard Jones	1909, 1913	15–2–3	.825
Ted Coy	1910	6–2–2	.700
John Field	1911	7–2–1	.750
Art Howe	1912	7–1–1	.833
Frank Hinkey	1914–1915	11–7–0	.611
Tad Jones	1916–1917, 1920–1927	60–15–4	.785
Albert Sharpe	1919	5–3–0	.625
Mal Stevens	1928–1932	21–11–8	.625
Reginald D. Root	1933	4–4–0	.500
Ducky Pond	1934–1940	30–25–2	.544
Spike Nelson	1941	1–7–0	.125
Howie Odell	1942–1947	35–15–2	.692
Herman Hickman	1948–1951	16–17–2	.486
Jordan Olivar	1952–1962	61–32–6	.646
John Pont	1963–1964	12–5–1	.694
Carmen Cozza	1965–1996	179–119–5	.599
Jack Siedlecki	1997–2008	71–48	.597
Tom Williams	2009–2011	16–14	.533
Anthony Reno	2012–2025	83–49	.629
Kevin Cahill	2026–present	0–0	–

== Rivalries ==
=== Harvard ===
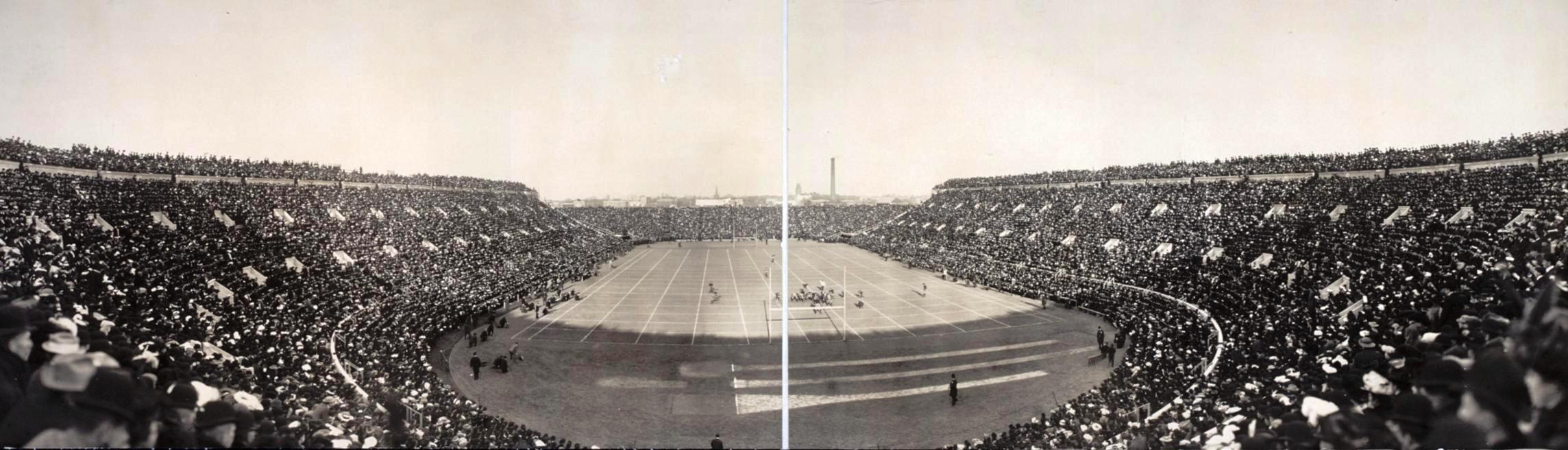
Harvard-Yale football game, 1905

Harvard and Yale have been competing against each other in football since 1875. The annual rivalry game between the two schools, known as "The Game", is played in November at the end of the football season. As of 2025, Yale leads the series 72–61–8.

The Game is the second oldest continuing rivalry and also the third most-played rivalry game in college football history, after the Lehigh–Lafayette rivalry (1884) and the Princeton–Yale game (1873). Sports Illustrated On Campus rated the Harvard–Yale rivalry the sixth-best in college athletics in 2003. After Harvard had a decided edge in the rivalry in the first decade and a half of the twenty-first century, Yale has won 7 out of the last 10 contests; the last three wins over Harvard cost the Crimson the outright league title and, in 2023 and 2025, earned Yale a share of the title. The 2025 multiple-touchdown win over a then-undefeated Harvard squad also earned Yale the first automatic bid to NCAA FCS post-season play in Ivy League history.

The Game is significant for historical reasons as the rules of The Game soon were adopted by other schools. Football's rules, conventions, and equipment, as well as elements of "atmosphere" such as the mascot and fight song, include many elements pioneered or nurtured at Harvard and Yale.

=== Princeton ===
The series with Princeton dates to 1873.

== Yale Bowl ==
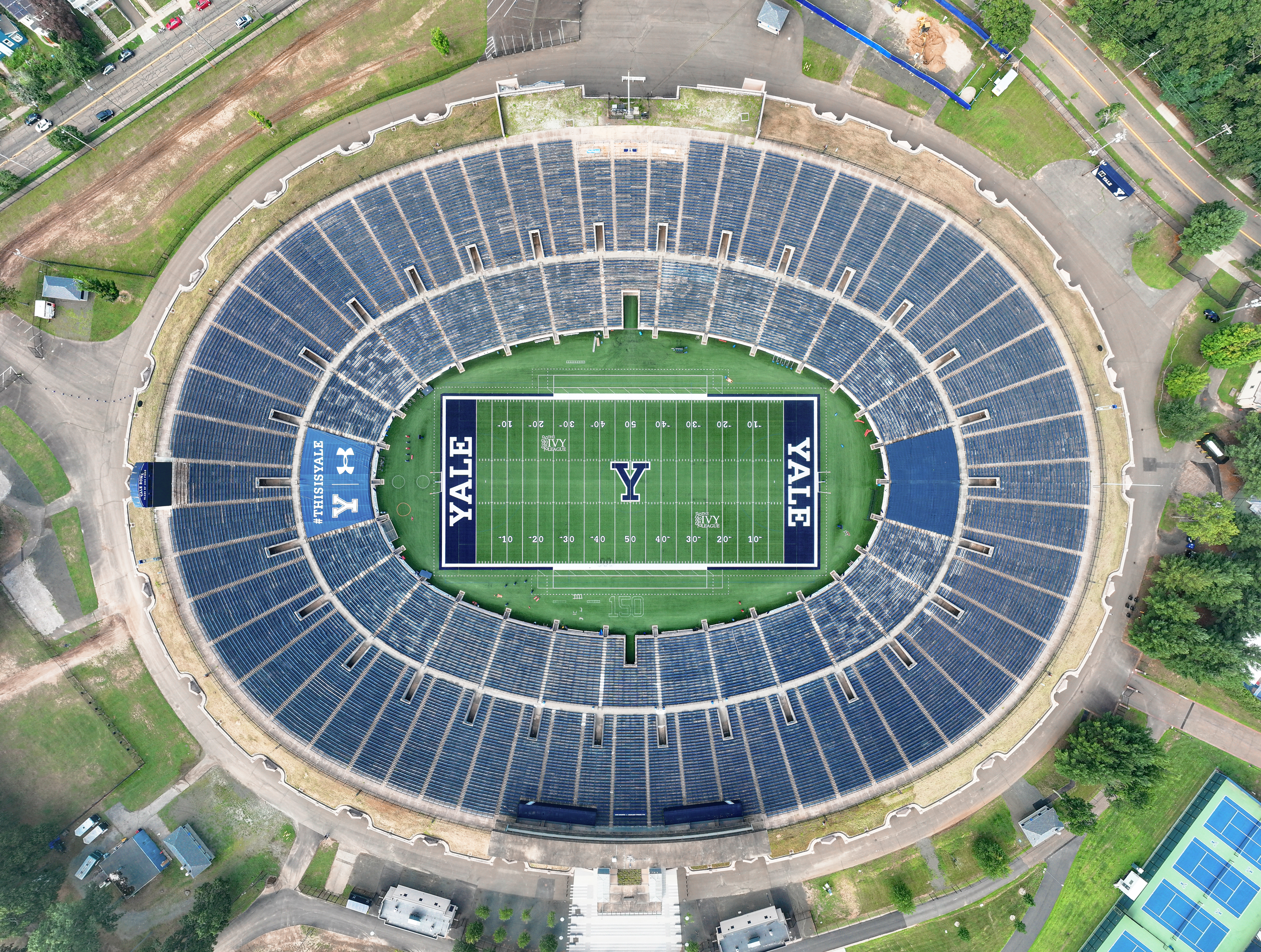
Yale Bowl

The Yale Bowl is Yale's football stadium in New Haven, Connecticut about 1-1/2 miles west of Yale's main campus. Completed in 1914, the stadium seats 61,446, reduced by renovations from the original capacity of 70,869.

Ground was broken on the stadium in August 1913. It was the first bowl-shaped stadium in the country, and provided inspiration for the design of such stadiums as the Los Angeles Memorial Coliseum, the Rose Bowl, and Michigan Stadium. Through its inspiration of the Rose Bowl stadium, its name is also the origin of college football's bowl games. It was the perfect setting for New Haven native Albie Booth, also known as "Little Boy Blue" to perform his heroics vs. Army in November 1929 and for the 47-yard "kick that made history" by Randall "Randy" C. Carter, '77, snapped by the stalwart center from Illinois, Ralph Bosch, '77 and surely placed by John "Nubes" Nubani, '78, in the last seconds of the 1975 Yale-Dartmouth game to win the game for Yale, 16–14. The victory lifted head coach Carm Cozza into a tie with the legendary Walter Camp for most victories by a Bulldog mentor. The current scoreboard (notable for the time clock being arranged vertically instead of horizontally) was added in 1958, and in 1986 the current press box was added. The first night game at the Bowl was played in 2016. The Bowl was declared a National Historic Landmark in 1987.

== College Football Hall of Fame inductees ==
As of 2024, 29 Yale Bulldogs players and coaches have been inducted into the College Football Hall of Fame.

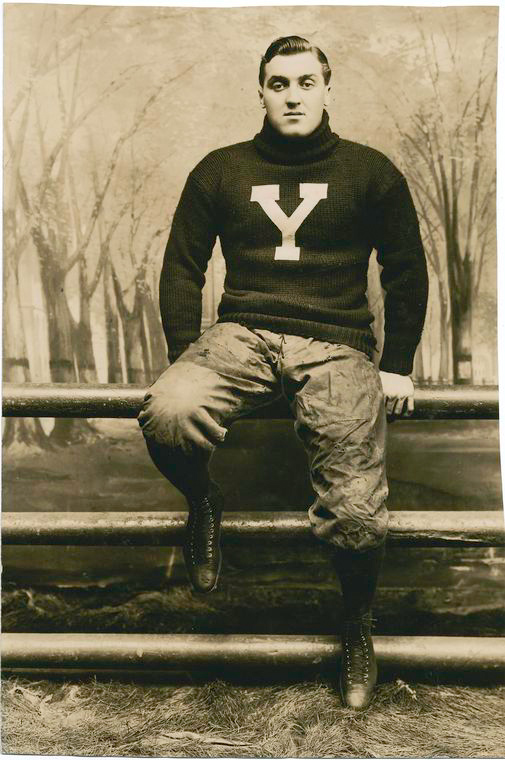
End Tom Shevlin was a four-time All-American from 1902 to 1905

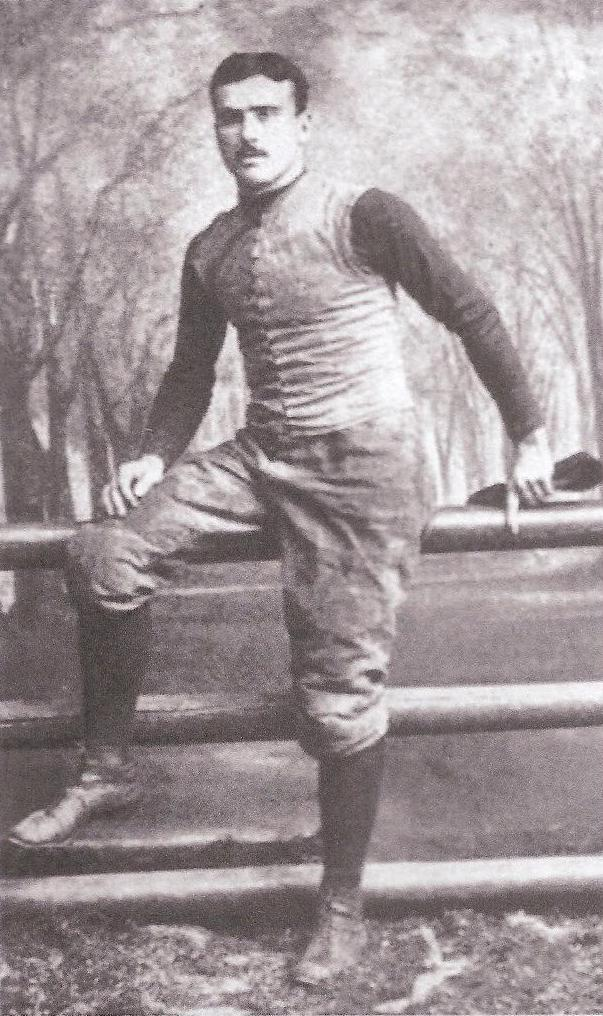
Lee "Bum" McClung later served as Treasurer of the United States

Name	Position	Years	Inducted
Mal Aldrich	HB	1919–1921	1972
Doug Bomeisler	End	1910–1912	1972
Albie Booth	HB	1929–1931	1966
Gordon Brown	G	1897–1900	1954
Walter Camp	Coach	1888–1895	1951
Pa Corbin	C	1886–1888	1969
Ted Coy	FB	1907–1909	1951
Carmen Cozza	Coach	1965–1996	2002
Clint Frank	HB	1935–1937	1955
Pudge Heffelfinger	G	1888–1891	1951
Bill Hickock	G	1892–1894	1971
Frank Hinkey	End	1891–1894	1951
James Hogan	T	1901–1904	1954
Art Howe	QB	1909–1911	1973
Dick Jauron	RB	1970–1972	2015
Howard Jones	Coach	1908–1940	1951
Tad Jones	Coach	1909–1927	1958
Larry Kelley	End	1934–1936	1969
Hank Ketcham	C, G	1911–1913	1968
John Kilpatrick	End	1908–1910	1955
Alex Kroll	C	1956, 1960–1961	1997
Bill Mallory	FB	1921–1923	1964
Lee McClung	HB	1888–1891	1963
Century Milstead	T	1920–1921, 1923	1977
Tom Shevlin	End	1902–1905	1954
Amos Alonzo Stagg	End	1885–1889	1951
Mal Stevens	QB, HB	1919–1921, 1923	1974
Herbert Sturhahn	G	1924–1926	1981
Sam Thorne	HB	1893–1895	1970

== Yale players in the NFL ==
More than 30 players from Yale have gone on to play in the National Football League, including running backs Calvin Hill, Chuck Mercein and Chris Hetherington, defensive backs Dick Jauron, Gary Fencik and Kenny Hill, tight ends Eric Johnson and John Spagnola, quarterback Brian Dowling, and linemen Fritz Barzilauskas, Century Milstead and Mike Pyle.

Name	Position	Years	Teams
Kiran Amegadjie	T	2024–	Chicago Bears
Shane Bannon	FB	2011–2011	Kansas City Chiefs
Fritz Barzilauskas	G	1947–1951	Boston Yanks, New York Bulldogs, New York Giants
Art Brama	T	1922–1923	Racine Legion
Bruce Caldwell	FB	1928	New York Giants
Rich Diana	RB	1982	Miami Dolphins
Brian Dowling	QB	1972–1977	New England Patriots, Charlotte Hornets (WFL), Green Bay Packers
Greg Dubinetz	G	1979	Washington Redskins
Joe Dufek	QB	1983–1985	Buffalo Bills, San Diego Chargers
Dieter Eiselen	Center	2020–	Chicago Bears, Houston Texans
Gary Fencik	DB	1976–1987	Chicago Bears
Nick Gargiulo	Center	2024–	Denver Broncos
Jaeden Graham	TE	2018-2021	Atlanta Falcons
Chris Hetherington	FB	1996–2006	Indianapolis Colts, Carolina Panthers, St. Louis Rams, Oakland Raiders, San Francisco 49ers
Calvin Hill	RB	1969–1981	Dallas Cowboys, The Hawaiians (WFL), Washington Redskins, Cleveland Browns
Kenny Hill	DB	1981–1989	Oakland Raiders, Los Angeles Raiders, New York Giants, Kansas City Chiefs
Dick Jauron	DB	1973–1980	Detroit Lions, Cincinnati Bengals
Eric Johnson	TE	2001–2007	San Francisco 49ers, New Orleans Saints
Herb Kempton	QB	1921	Canton Bulldogs
Alex Kroll	T, C	1962–1962	New York Titans
Nate Lawrie	TE	2004–2008	Tampa Bay Buccaneers, New Orleans Saints, Cincinnati Bengals
Don Martin	DB	1973–1976	New England Patriots, Kansas City Chiefs, Tampa Bay Buccaneers
Chuck Mercein	RB	1965–1970	New York Giants, Green Bay Packers, Washington Redskins, New York Jets
Than Merrill	DB	2001	Chicago Bears
Century Milstead	T	1925–1928	New York Giants, Philadelphia Quakers (AFL), New York Giants
Foyesade Oluokun	LB	2018–	Atlanta Falcons, Jacksonville Jaguars
John Prchlik	T	1949–1953	Detroit Lions
Eugene Profit	DB	1986–1988	New England Patriots
Mike Pyle	C	1961–1969	Chicago Bears
Jeff Rohrer	LB	1982–1987	Dallas Cowboys
Bill Schuler	T	1947–1948	New York Giants
John Spagnola	TE	1979–1989	Philadelphia Eagles, Seattle Seahawks, Green Bay Packers
Rodney Thomas II	DB	2022–	Indianapolis Colts
Mason Tipton	WR	2024–	New Orleans Saints
Tyler Varga	FB	2015–2016	Indianapolis Colts
Paul Walker	End, DB	1948	New York Giants

== All-Americans ==
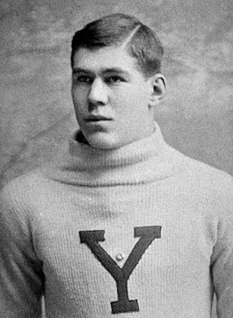
Yale guard Pudge Heffelfinger became the first professional football player in 1892.

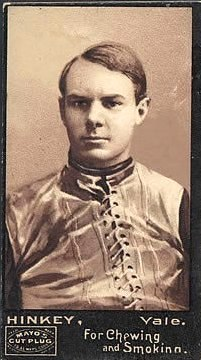
Frank Hinkey was a four-time All-American (1891–1894).

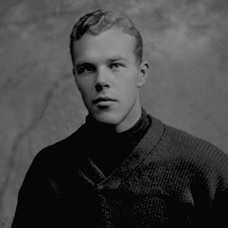
Fullback Ted Coy was a three-time All-American (1907–1909).

Since the first All-American team was selected by Caspar Whitney in 1889, more than 100 Yale football players have been selected as first-team All-Americans. Consensus All-Americans are noted below with bold typeface.

- 1889: Amos Alonzo Stagg (End), Charles O. Gill (T), Pudge Heffelfinger (G)
- 1890: William Rhodes (T), Pudge Heffelfinger, Lee McClung (HB)
- 1891: Frank Hinkey (End), John A. Hartwell (End), Wallace Winter (T), Pudge Heffelfinger (G), Lee McClung (HB)
- 1892: Frank Hinkey (End), Alexander Hamilton Wallis (T), Vance McCormick (HB)
- 1893: Frank Hinkey (End), Bill Hickock (G), Frank Butterworth (HB)
- 1894: Frank Hinkey (End), Anson Beard (T), Bill Hickock (G), Phillip Stillman (C), George Adee (QB), Frank Butterworth (FB)
- 1895: Fred Murphy (T), Sam Thorne (HB)
- 1896: Lyman Bass (End), Fred Murphy (T), Burr Chamberlain (C), Clarence Fincke (QB)
- 1897: John Hall (End), Burr Chamberlain (T), Rodgers (T), Gordon Brown (G), Charles Chadwick (G), George Cadwalader (C), Charles de Saulles (QB)
- 1898: Burr Chamberlain (G), Gordon Brown (G), Malcolm McBride (HB)
- 1899: George Stillman (T), Gordon Brown (G), Albert Sharpe (HB), Malcolm McBride (FB)
- 1900: Sherman Coy (End), George Stillman (T), James Bloomer (T), Gordon Brown (G), Herman Olcott (C), George Chadwick (HB), William Finck (HB), Albert Sharpe (HB), Perry Hale (FB) Charles Gould (End)
- 1901: James Hogan (T), Herman Olcott (G), Henry Holt (C)
- 1902: Tom Shevlin (End), Ralph Kinney (T), James Hogan (T), Edgar Glass (G), Henry Holt (C), Foster Rockwell (QB), George Chadwick (HB), Harold Metcalf (HB), Morgan Bowman (FB)
- 1903: Charles Rafferty (End), Tom Shevlin (End), James Hogan (T), James Bloomer (G), Foster Rockwell (QB), Harold Metcalf (HB), Ledyard Mitchell (FB)
- 1904: Tom Shevlin (End), Neal (End), James Hogan (T), James Bloomer (T), Ralph Kinney (G), Roswell Tripp (G), Clint Roraback (C), Foster Rockwell (QB), Lydig Hoyt (HB)
- 1905: Tom Shevlin (End), Roswell Tripp (G), Guy Hutchinson (QB), Howard Roome (HB)
- 1906: Robert Forbes (End), Lucius Horatio Biglow (T), Arthur Brides (G), Clarence Hockenberger (C), Tad Jones (QB), Hugh Knox (HB), Paul Veeder (FB), Samuel F.B. Morse (FB)
- 1907: Clarence Alcott (End), Lucius Horatio Biglow (T), Tad Jones (QB), Ted Coy (FB)
- 1908: William Goebel (G), Hamlin Andrus (G), Ted Coy (FB)
- 1909: John Kilpatrick (End), Henry Hobbs (T), Hamlin Andrus (G), Carroll Cooney (C), Stephen Philbin (HB), Ted Coy (FB)
- 1910: John Kilpatrick (End), Jim Scully (T), Fred J. Daly (HB)
- 1911: Douglas Bomeisler (End), Jim Scully (T), Pomeroy Francis (G), Hank Ketcham (C), Art Howe (QB), Jesse Philbin (FB)
- 1912: Douglas Bomeisler (End), Carroll T. Cooney (G), Hank Ketcham (C)
- 1913: Ben Avery (End), Bud Talbott (T), John Pendleton (G), Hank Ketcham (G), William Marting (C)
- 1914: Red Brann (End), Bud Talbott (T), Harry LeGore (FB)
- 1915: Clinton Black (G)
- 1916: Charles Comerford (End), George Moseley (End), Clinton Black (G), Lawrence Fox (G)
- 1920: Tim Callahan (G), John Acosta (G)
- 1921: Malcolm Aldrich (HB)
- 1922: Harry Cross (G), Phillip Cruikshank (G)
- 1923: Century Milstead (T), Bill Mallory (FB)
- 1924: Richard Luman (End), Johnny Joss (T), Winslow Lovejoy (C), Ducky Pond (HB)
- 1925: Johnny Joss (T), Herbert Sturhahn (G)
- 1926: Herbert Sturhahn (G)
- 1927: Dwight Fishwick (End), Sidney Quarrier (T), Bill Webster (G), John Charlesworth (C), Bruce Caldwell (HB)
- 1929: Wade Greene (G), Albie Booth (QB)
- 1930: Frederick Linehan (G)
- 1932: Robert Lassiter (HB)
- 1936: Larry Kelley (End), Clint Frank (QB)
- 1937: Clint Frank (QB)
- 1942: Spencer Moseley (C)
- 1944: Paul Walker (End)
- 1945: Paul Walker (End)
- 1960: Ben Balme (G)
- 1970: Tom Neville (T)
- 1972: Dick Jauron (RB)
- 1977: John Pagliaro (RB)
- 1981: Rich Diana (RB)

== Future non-conference opponents ==
Announced schedules as of April 28, 2026.

2026	2027	2028	2029
at Holy Cross	at Albany	at Holy Cross	at Rhode Island
Merrimack	Holy Cross	Albany	
Rhode Island			

== See also ==
- List of NCAA football teams by wins
- American football in the United States
