= Hamlin Andrus =

American football player and financier (1885–1957)

Profile
- Position: Guard

Personal information
- Born: March 30, 1885; Yonkers, New York, U.S.
- Died: July 9, 1957 (aged 72); Yonkers, New York, U.S.

Career information
- College: Yale

Awards and highlights
- 2× National champion (1907, 1909); 2× Consensus All-American (1908, 1909)

Hamlin Foster Andrus (March 30, 1885 – July 9, 1957) was an American football player and financier. He played college football at Yale University from 1908 to 1909 and was selected as a consensus All-American at the guard position in 1909. Andrus was the son of John Emory Andrus, a U.S. Congressman and millionaire.

After graduating from Yale in 1910, Andrus pursued a variety of financial interests. He also worked with his father in operating the Arlington Chemical Company (later known as U.S. Vitamin Corporation) and was also a trustee of the SURDNA Foundation, a philanthropic endowment corporation formed by his father. He also held a patent on machinery for the manufacture of concrete blocks.

In March 1911, Andrus married Mary F. Hotchkiss. They had a daughter, Julia Dyckman Andrus. Andrus lived for most of his life in Yonkers, New York. He moved to Greenwich, Connecticut, in 1950. He died in 1957 at the age of 72 either at his farm in Bristol, New Hampshire, or at his home in Greenwich.
