= Graham Foster (American football) =

American football player and coach

Playing career
- 1899–1904: Fairmount
- 1905–1907: Yale
- Positions: Tackle, guard

Coaching career (HC unless noted)
- 1908: Beloit

Head coaching record
- Overall: 1–4–1

Accomplishments and honors

Championships
- National (1907)

Graham Foster was an American football player and coach. He served as the head football coach at Beloit College in Beloit, Wisconsin in 1908, compiling a record of 1–4–1. In the early days of college football, Foster enjoyed relaxed rules which permitted him to play for six seasons at Fairmount College—now known as Wichita State University—before playing three additional seasons for Yale University.
