= 1909 All-America college football team =

Official list of the best college football players of 1909

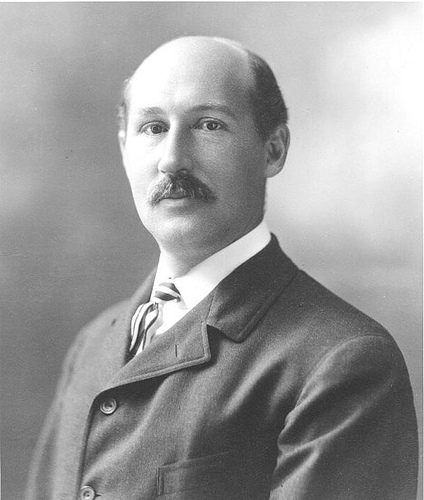
Walter Camp, the only "official" All-America selector in 1909

The 1909 All-America college football team is composed of college football players who were selected as All-Americans for the 1909 college football season. The only selector for the 1909 season who has been recognized as "official" by the National Collegiate Athletic Association (NCAA) is Walter Camp. Many other sports writers and newspapers also selected All-America teams in 1909. The United Press and The Atlanta Constitution both published their own "consensus" All-America teams based on their aggregating the first-team picks of a number of selectors (22 by the United Press and 10 by The Atlanta Constitution).

A total of nine players from the 1909 Yale Bulldogs football team were selected as first-team All-Americans by at least one selector. The Yale players selected as All-Americans were Hamlin Andrus, Carroll Cooney, Ted Coy, William Goebel, Henry Hobbs, John Kilpatrick, Theodore Lilley, Walter S. Logan, and Stephen Philbin. The 1909 Yale team was undefeated and outscored its opponents 209 to 0.

Only two players from schools outside of the Ivy League have been recognized as consensus first-team All-Americans. They are Albert Benbrook of Michigan and John McGovern of Minnesota.

== Walter Camp's "official" selections ==
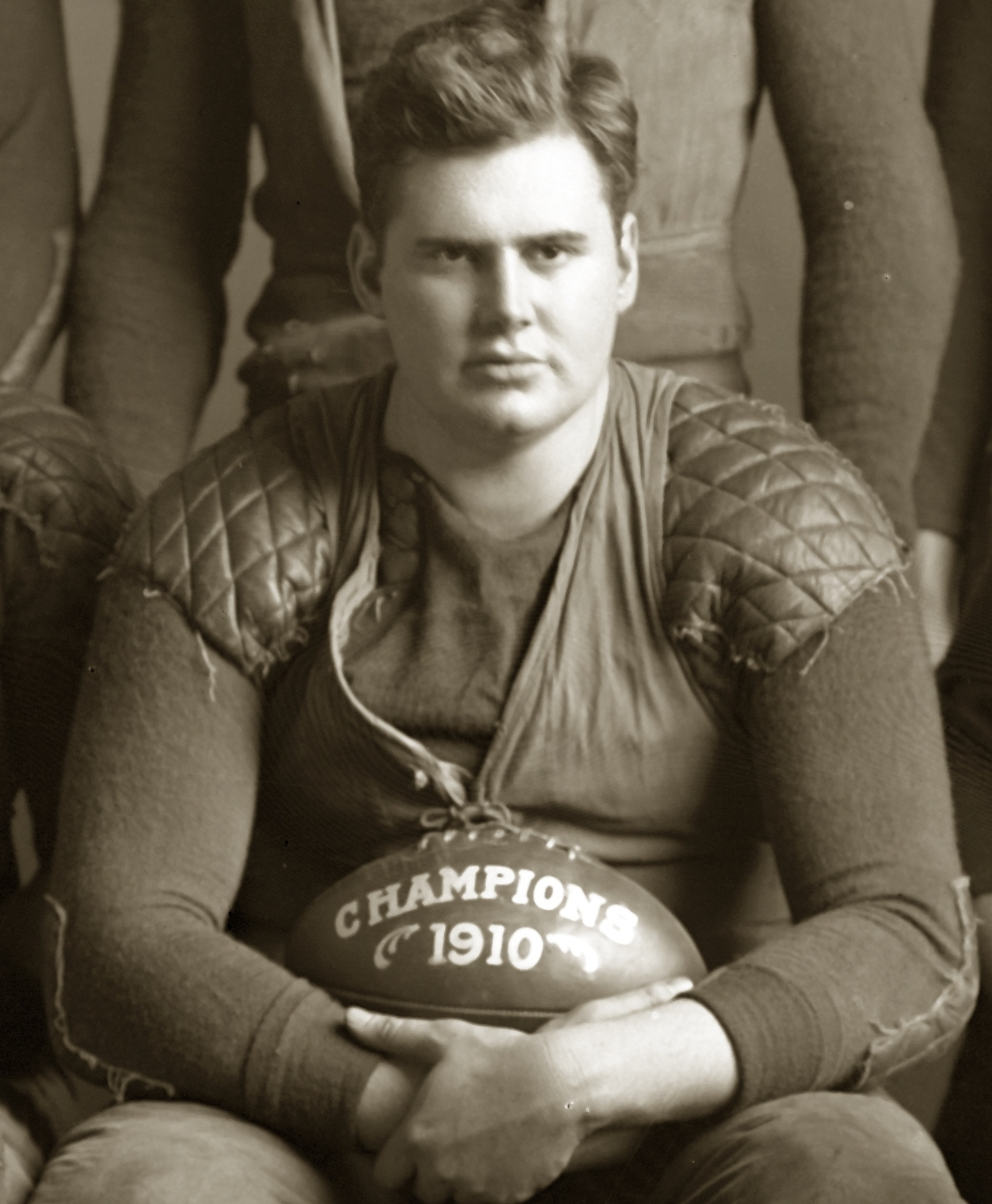
Albert Benbrook of Michigan

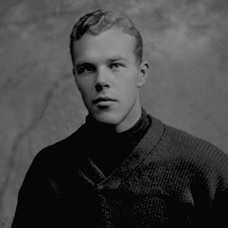
Ted Coy of Yale

The only individual who has been recognized as an "official" selector by the National Collegiate Athletic Association (NCAA) for the 1909 season is Walter Camp. Accordingly, the NCAA's official listing of "Consensus All-America Selections" mirrors Camp's first-team picks. Camp 1909 All-America team was dominated by players from the East, with nine of his eleven picks coming from Ivy League schools, including six from his own alma mater, Yale.

The dominance of Ivy League and Eastern players on Camp's All-America teams led to criticism over the years that his selections were biased against players from the leading Western universities, including Chicago, Michigan, Minnesota, Wisconsin, and Notre Dame. In announcing his 1909 team, Camp himself acknowledged the innovative football played in the West:

"There is not the faintest shadow of doubt that the Western organizations can exhibit to-day a far more varied form of attack than anything displayed in the East. The shift plays and special formations are almost without number, and the drill of the teams in signal practice is so constant and well carried out that they perform these manoeuvres with remarkable rapidity, and from this very feature they offer a greater scope of forward passing than any of the Eastern teams."

Camp's All-Americans for 1909 included:

- Hamlin Andrus. Andrus was a guard for Yale. His father, John Emory Andrus, was a U.S. Congressman and millionaire.
- Albert Benbrook. Benbrook played at the guard position for Michigan. He was inducted into the College Football Hall of Fame in 1971. He weighed over 200 pounds, was considered "huge for his time," and was known as a "dominating force" due to his "exceptional quickness."
- Carroll Cooney. Cooney played at the center position for Yale. He later ran a professional dance orchestra in the 1920s.
- Ted Coy. Coy played at the fullback and halfback positions for Yale. He was inducted into the College Football Hall of Fame in 1951. In 2008, Sports Illustrated sought to answer the question, "Who would have won the Heisman from 1900–1934?" Its selection for 1909 was Coy who led an undefeated Yale team that outscored its opponents, 209–0.
- Hamilton Fish III. Fish played at the tackle position for Harvard. He later served from 1920 to 1945 in the United States House of Representatives where he was an outspoken isolationist, anti-Communist, and critic of Franklin D. Roosevelt.
- Henry Hobbs. Hobbs played guard for Yale. He gained notoriety again in 1911 when he eloped with the daughter of John Emory Andrus, who was reported to be the "richest man in Congress." The secret wedding resulted in extensive coverage in newspapers from Boston to Baltimore.
- John "Kil" Kilpatrick. Kilpatrick played at the end position for Yale. He was inducted into the College Football Hall of Fame in 1955. He later ran Madison Square Garden for more than 25 years and oversaw the operations of the New York Rangers from 1934 to 1960. He was inducted into the Hockey Hall of Fame in 1960.
- John McGovern. McGovern played quarterback for Minnesota. He was inducted into the College Football Hall of Fame in 1966.

== Other selectors ==
By 1909, there was a proliferation of newspapers and sports writers choosing their own All-America teams. Recognizing the difficulties faced by any single person who could only watch one game per week, some organizations began to seek better methodologies for selecting a true "consensus" All-America team. The United Press selected a consensus All-America team, based on aggregating the All-American picks of 22 individuals who it identified as "the best football experts." The Detroit Free Press published the vote count among the 22 experts as follows:

- Left end: John Kilpatrick, Yale (unanimous – 22 votes)
- Left tackle: Henry Hobbs, Yale (12 votes)
- Left guard: Hamlin Andrus, Yale (14 votes); William Goebel of Yale finished second with 13 votes in the closest voting at any position
- Center: Carroll Cooney, Yale (21 votes)
- Right guard: Clark Tobin, Dartmouth (14 votes)
- Right tackle: Hamilton Fish III, Harvard (18 votes)
- Right end: Lawrence Dunlap Smith, Harvard (5 votes)
- Quarterback: Earl Sprackling, Brown (12 votes)
- Left halfback: Stephen Philbin, Yale (21 votes)
- Right halfback: Ted Coy, Yale (20 votes)
- Fullback: Wayland Manning Minot, Harvard (20 votes)

The Atlanta Constitution also weighed in with its own effort to determine a consensus team. In December 1909, the Constitution published a consensus team by aggregating the All-America selections of ten leading daily newspapers from the East: The New York Times, New York Herald, New York World, New York Globe, New York Sun, Telegraph, Evening World, and the Boston Herald. The Constitution gave a point for each newspaper selecting a player as an All-American. The players selected as "consensus" All-Americans (with vote count for runners-up also listed) were as follows:

- Left end: John Kilpatrick, Yale (10 – unanimous)
- Left tackle: Henry Hobbs, Yale (7); Theodore Lilley, Yale (2); Robert Gordon McKay, Harvard (1)
- Left guard: Hamlin Andrus, Yale (8); Tobin, Dartmouth (1); William Goebel, Yale (1)
- Center: Carroll Cooney, Yale (10 – unanimous)
- Right guard: Clark Tobin, Dartmouth (4); Goebel, Yale (3); Waller, Princeton (2); Andrus, Yale (1)
- Right tackle: Hamilton Fish III, Harvard (8); Dan Pullen, Navy (1); Rudolph Siegling, Princeton (1)
- Right end: Lawrence Dunlap Smith, Harvard (3); Adrian Regnier, Brown (2); Gilbert Goodwin Browne, Harvard (2); McCaffrey, Fordham (1); Harlan Page, Chicago (1); Walter S. Logan, Yale (1)
- Quarterback: Earl Sprackling, Brown (7); Voorhees, Penn State (2); John McGovern, Minnesota (1)
- Left halfback: Stephen Philbin, Yale (5); Coy, Yale, (5)
- Right halfback: Wayland Manning Minot, Harvard (5); Philbin, Yale (4); Dave Allerdice, Michigan (1)
- Fullback: Ted Coy, Yale (5); Wayland Minot, Harvard (5)

The efforts of the United Press and Atlanta Constitution showed that a number of Camp's picks were not truly "consensus" picks. For example, Sprackling of Brown was the consensus All-American quarterback as reflected in the lists issued by both the United Press and the Constitution. Yet, Camp selected Sprackling for his third team. Further differences include John McGovern, Albert Benbrook and Adrian Regnier, who were picked by Camp as a first-team All-Americans at the quarterback, guard and end positions. Out of the ten selectors aggregated by the Atlanta Constitution, none chose Benbrook, only one chose McGovern and two chose Regnier.

Left end John Kilpatrick of Yale was the only player who was a unanimous first-team All-America pick by Walter Camp, all 10 of the selectors aggregated by the Atlanta Constitution, and all 22 selectors aggregated by the United Press.

== All-Americans of 1909 ==
=== Ends ===
- **Adrian Regnier**, Brown (WC-1; NYT-1; TC-1)
- **John Kilpatrick**, Yale (College Football Hall of Fame) (WC-1; UP-1 (22); AC-1 (10); NYT-1; TC-1)
- Lawrence Dunlap "Bud" Smith, Harvard (WC-2; UP-1 (5); AC-1 (3))
- Laurence Bankart, Dartmouth (WC-2; NYT-2)
- Harry Braddock, Penn (WC-2)
- Harlan Page, Chicago (WC-3)
- Frank McCaffrey, Fordham (WC-3)
- Harry Vaughan, Yale (NYT-2)

=== Tackles ===
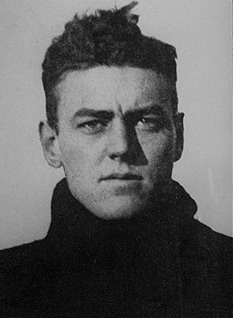
Hamilton Fish III of Harvard

- **Hamilton Fish III**, Harvard (College Football Hall of Fame) (WC-1; UP-1 (18); AC-1 (7); NYT-1; TC-1)
- **Henry Hobbs**, Yale (WC-1; UP-1 (12); AC-1 (7); NYT-1)
- James Walker, Minnesota (TC-1)
- Theodore Lilley, Yale (WC-2; NYT-2)
- Robert McKay, Harvard (WC-2)
- Rudolph Siegling, Princeton (WC-3)
- William M. Casey, Michigan (WC-3)
- Daniel Pullen, Army (NYT-2)

=== Guards ===
- **Albert Benbrook**, Michigan (College Football Hall of Fame) (WC-1)
- **Hamlin Andrus**, Yale (WC-1; UP-1 (14); AC-1 (8); NYT-1; TC-1)
- Clark Tobin, Dartmouth (WC-2; UP-1 (14); AC-1 (4); NYT-1; TC-1)
- William "Bill" Goebel, Yale (WC-2; UP-2 (13))
- Lothrop Withington, Harvard (WC-3)
- Robert Thomas Fisher, Harvard (WC-3; NYT-2)
- P. E. Waller, Princeton (NYT-2)

=== Centers ===
- **Carroll Cooney**, Yale (WC-1; UP-1 (21); AC-1 (10); NYT-1; TC-1)
- Paul Withington, Harvard (WC-2; NYT-2)
- H. E. Farnum, Minnesota (WC-3)

=== Quarterbacks ===
- **John McGovern**, Minnesota (College Football Hall of Fame) (WC-1; TC-1)
- Earl Sprackling, Brown (WC-3; UP-1 (12); AC-1 (7); NYT-1)
- Art Howe, Yale (WC-2)
- Harlan Page, Chicago (NYT-2)

=== Halfbacks ===
- **Stephen Philbin**, Yale (WC-1; UP-1 (21); AC-1 (9); NYT-2)
- **Wayland Manning Minot**, Harvard (WC-1; UP-1 [fb] (20); AC-1 (10); NYT-1 [fb]; TC-1)
- Dave Allerdice, Michigan (WC-2; NYT-1; TC-1)
- Joe Magidsohn, Michigan (WC-2)
- Hamilton Corbett, Harvard (WC-3)
- Red Miller, Notre Dame (WC-3)
- Theodore "Ted" Frothingham, Harvard (NYT-2)

=== Fullbacks ===
- **Ted Coy**, Yale (College Football Hall of Fame) (WC-1; UP-1 [hb] (20); AC-1 (10); NYT-1 [hb]; TC-1)
- John L. Marks, Dartmouth (WC-2)
- George McCaa, Lafayette (WC-3; NYT-2)

=== Key ===
NCAA recognized selectors for 1909

- WC = Collier's Weekly as selected by Walter Camp

Other selectors

- NYT = The New York Times
- TC = Tommy Clark, noted sports writer whose work appeared in several papers
- UP = United Press consensus All-American team, based on selections from 22 of "the best football experts." The numbers shown in parentheses reflect the number of voters (out of the total of 22) who selected the person as a first-team All-American.
- AC = The Atlanta Constitution based on aggregating the All-America selections of ten leading Eastern newspapers. The numbers shown in parentheses reflect the number of voters (out of the total of 10) who selected the person as a first-team All-American.

Bold = Consensus All-American

- 1 – First-team selection
- 2 – Second-team selection
- 3 – Third-team selection

== See also ==
- 1909 All-Southern college football team
- 1909 All-Western college football team
