= Malcolm McBride =

American football player and coach (1878–1941)

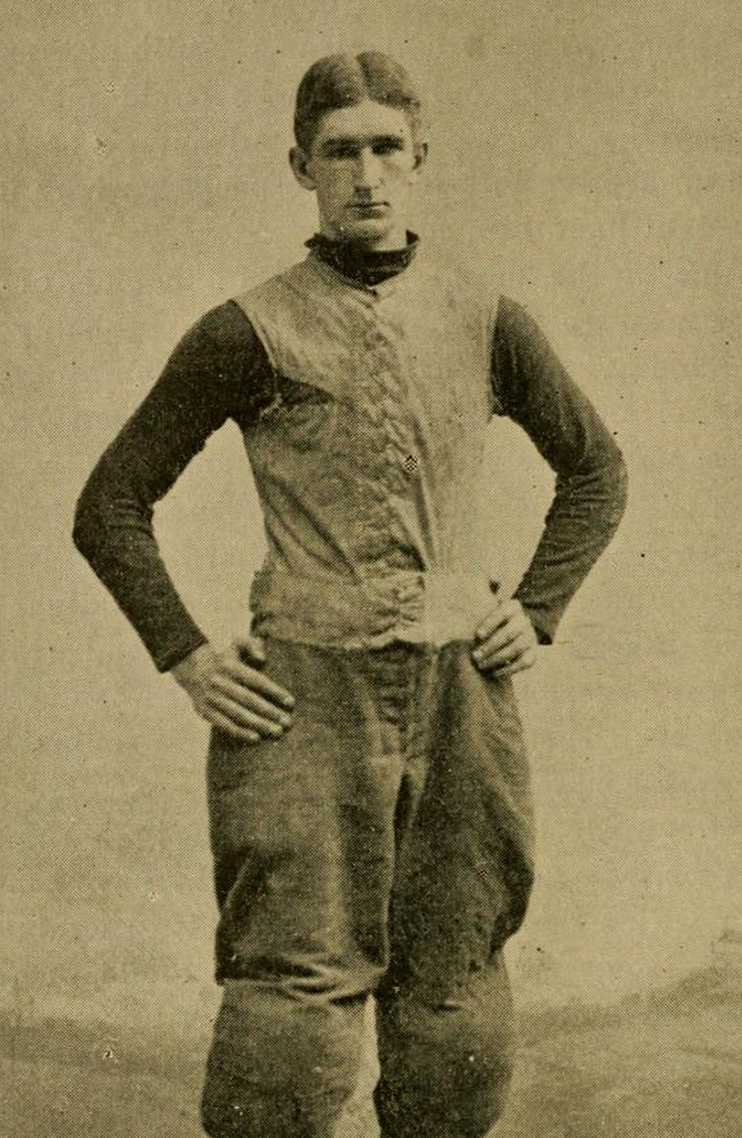
- McBride pictured in Spalding's Official Football Guide, 1899

Biographical details
- Born: August 22, 1878; Cleveland, Ohio, U.S.
- Died: December 21, 1941 (aged 63); Cleveland, Ohio, U.S.

Playing career
- 1897–1899: Yale
- Positions: Halfback, fullback

Coaching career (HC unless noted)
- 1900: Yale

Head coaching record
- Overall: 12–0

Accomplishments and honors

Championships
- National (1900)

Awards
- 2× Consensus All-American (1898, 1899); Second-team All-American (1897)

Malcolm Lee McBride (August 22, 1878 – December 21, 1941) was an American football player and coach. He played college football at Yale University as a halfback and fullback, and was selected as an All-American in 1898 and 1899. McBride was known for his skill as a left-footed kicker. One newspaper described his punts as follows:

"Malcolm McBride, who was a Yale fullback, was one of the stars of the kicking game in 1899. He sent a long, low punt that was exceedingly hard to handle. It usually struck the ground and bounded some distance before the backs could recover it."

After graduating as part of Yale's class of 1900, McBride returned as the school's head football coach in 1900. McBride's chief adviser as Yale's coach was Walter Camp, and his assistants were Frank Hinkey and Frank Butterworth. McBride coached the 1900 Yale football team to a perfect 12–0 record. The team has been acknowledged as the consensus national champion of the 1900 college football season.

In 1917, McBride was one of the directors of a program on "training camp activities for the promotion of recreative athletics" among soldiers encamped at various locations for participation in World War I.

== Head coaching record ==
Year	Team	Overall	Conference	Standing	Bowl/playoffs
Yale Bulldogs (Independent) (1900)
1900	Yale	12–0			
Yale:		12–0			
Total:		12–0			
