= Henry Hobbs (American football) =

American football player and coach (1887–1931)

Biographical details
- Born: May 10, 1887; Slatersville, Rhode Island, U.S.
- Died: June 28, 1931 (aged 44); New York, New York, U.S.

Playing career
- 1906: Dartmouth
- 1907–1909: Yale
- Position: Tackle

Coaching career (HC unless noted)
- 1910–1913: Amherst

Head coaching record
- Overall: 13–17–2

Accomplishments and honors

Awards
- Consensus All-American (1909)

Henry Homer Hobbs (May 10, 1887 – June 28, 1931) was an American football player and coach. He played college football at Yale University and was selected as a consensus All-American at the tackle position in 1909. He also served as the head coach at Amherst College from 1910 to 1913, compiling a 13–17–2 record with the Lord Jeffs.

During World War I, Hobbs was active with the Commission for Relief in Belgium and the American Field Service. When the United States entered the war, he served in the United States Army and was put in charge of the procurement, storage, and distribution of lubricating oils for the American Expeditionary Forces.

== Early years ==
Hobbs was born in 1887 in Slatersville, Rhode Island. His father, Charles Henry Hobbs, owned a knitting mill in Palmer, Massachusetts. Hobbs attended preparatory school at Andover and was captain of the Andover football team in 1905.

== College football player ==
Hobbs enrolled at Dartmouth College during the 1906-1907 academic year and played on the Dartmouth Big Green football team in 1906. He subsequently transferred to Yale and joined Yale's football team in 1907. He was selected as a consensus All-American at the tackle position in 1909. Hobbs was also a "star hammer thrower" for Yale. He was also a member of The Colony and Berzelus while at Yale.

== Football coach at Amherst ==
Hobbs was hired as the head football coach at Amherst in January 1910. He was the head coach at Amherst from 1910 to 1913, compiling a 13–17–2 record. In January 1914, Hobbs announced that he would not return as Amherst's football coach in the fall of 1914. Hobss stated that he intended to focus on his business duties.

== Business career and military service ==
While coaching the Amherst football team, Hobbs was employed in a department store in Springfield, Massachusetts, from 1910 to 1911 and in the bond department of Hayden, Stone & Company in Boston from 1911 to 1913. From 1913 to 1914, he was employed with Logan & Bryan, commission merchants in Chicago.

In 1915, 15 months before the United States entered World War I, Hobbs sailed to France to serve with the French Ambulance Corps and later with the French Intelligence Corps. He was also a member of the organization department of the Commission for Relief in Belgium in 1915. He also worked with the American Field Service where he was attached to the 1st French Army from 1915 to 1916. In 1917, when the United States entered the war, he served in the United States Army with the rank of captain. He was responsible for procurement, storage, and distribution of lubricating oils for the American Expeditionary Forces. After he was discharged from the military in January 1919, he remained engaged in the oil business. He later became a stone engineer for the Fuller Construction Company of New York.

== Family and death ==
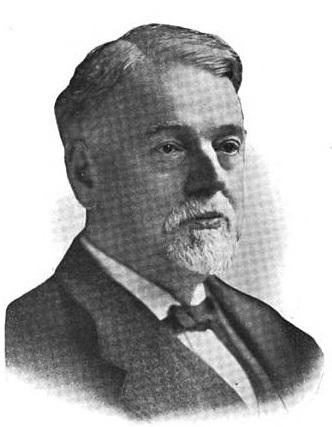
John Emory Andrus

In January 1911, Hobbs married Helen Whittier Andrus, the daughter of John Emory Andrus, a U.S. Congressman. The marriage was opposed by Congressman Andrus, reported to be a millionaire and the "richest man in Congress". The wedding occurred in secret and resulted in extensive coverage in newspapers from Boston to Baltimore. Congressman Andrus was reported to be "disconsolate" over the decision of his "favorite daughter" to marry a man who was "at present 'aisle manager' for a department store in Springfield, Mass." Hobbs replied in the press that he had $100,000 of his own and that he intended to go into business for himself.

Hobbs and his wife had a daughter, Eleanore Bourne Hobbs, born in August 1912. The couple divorced in 1916, and Hobbs was not permitted to see his daughter for 13 years. In 1929, Hobbs won a habeas corpus action requiring his ex-wife to allow him to see his 17-year-old daughter.

Hobbs was married in 1928 to Edna Shirk. In June 1931, he died from heart disease at his home in New York City. He was 44 years old at the time of his death. Hobbs was buried in Palmer, Massachusetts.
