= 1907 Yale Bulldogs football team =

American college football season

1907 Yale Bulldogs football
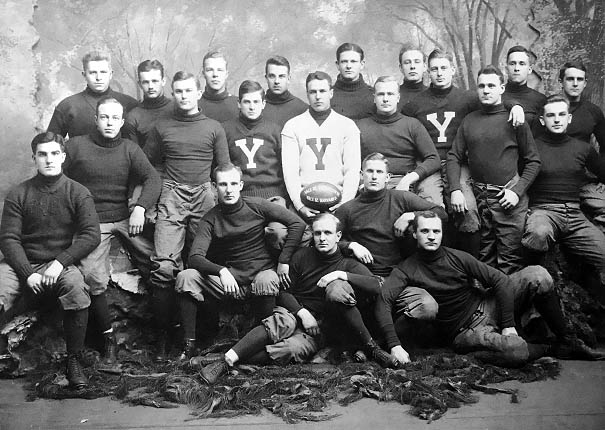

National champion
- Conference: Independent
- Record: 9–0–1
- Head coach: William F. Knox (1st season)
- Captain: Lucius Horatio Bigelow
- Home stadium: Yale Field

1907 Eastern college football independents records
	Conf.			Overall
Team	W	L	T	W		L		T
Yale		–		9	–	0	–	1
Dartmouth		–		8	–	0	–	1
Penn		–		11	–	1	–	0
Carlisle		–		10	–	1	–	0
Temple		–		4	–	0	–	2
Fordham		–		6	–	1	–	1
Cornell		–		8	–	2	–	0
Western U. of Penn.		–		8	–	2	–	0
Princeton		–		7	–	2	–	0
Washington & Jefferson		–		7	–	2	–	0
Lafayette		–		7	–	2	–	1
Lehigh		–		7	–	2	–	1
Swarthmore		–		6	–	2	–	0
Army		–		6	–	2	–	1
NYU		–		5	–	2	–	0
Vermont		–		4	–	1	–	2
Harvard		–		7	–	3	–	0
Brown		–		7	–	3	–	0
Penn State		–		6	–	4	–	0
Syracuse		–		5	–	3	–	1
Drexel		–		3	–	2	–	2
Colgate		–		4	–	4	–	1
Geneva		–		4	–	5	–	2
Dickinson		–		3	–	4	–	2
Amherst		–		3	–	4	–	1
Tufts		–		3	–	4	–	1
Franklin & Marshall		–		4	–	6	–	0
Rutgers		–		3	–	5	–	1
Springfield Training School		–		2	–	4	–	2
Bucknell		–		4	–	7	–	0
New Hampshire		–		1	–	5	–	2
Villanova		–		1	–	5	–	1
Holy Cross		–		1	–	7	–	2
Wesleyan		–		1	–	7	–	1
Carnegie Tech		–		1	–	8	–	0

The 1907 Yale Bulldogs football team was an American football team that represented Yale University as an independent during the 1907 college football season. The team finished with a 9–0–1 record, shut out nine of ten opponents, and outscored all opponents by a total of 208 to 10. William F. Knox was the head coach, and Lucius Horatio Bigelow was the team captain.

Yale was ranked first in the nation by Caspar Whitney in January 1908. The team was additionally later retroactively named as the national champion by the Billingsley Report, the Helms Athletic Foundation, the Houlgate System, the National Championship Foundation, and Parke H. Davis.

Four Yale players were selected as consensus first-team players on the 1907 All-America team. The team's consensus All-Americans were: quarterback Tad Jones; fullback Ted Coy; end Clarence Alcott; and tackle Lucius Horatio Biglow.

== Schedule ==
Date	Opponent	Site	Result	Attendance	Source
October 2	Wesleyan	Yale Field; New Haven, CT	W 25–0		
October 5	Syracuse	Yale Field; New Haven, CT	W 11–0		
October 9	Springfield Training School	Yale Field; New Haven, CT	W 18–0		
October 12	Holy Cross	Yale Field; New Haven, CT	W 52–0		
October 19	at Army	The Plain; West Point, NY	T 0–0	10,000	
October 26	Villanova	Yale Field; New Haven, CT	W 45–0		
November 2	Washington & Jefferson	Yale Field; New Haven, CT	W 11–0		
November 9	Brown	Yale Field; New Haven, CT	W 22–0		
November 16	Princeton	Yale Field; New Haven, CT (rivalry)	W 12–10	34,000	
November 23	at Harvard	Harvard Stadium; Boston, MA (rivalry)	W 12–0	40,000	

== Roster ==
- Clarence Alcott, E
- Roderick Beebe, E
- George R. Berger, HB
- Alfred A. Biddle, E
- Lucius Horatio Biglow, T
- Boggs, G
- William P. Bomar, HB
- Arthur Brides, G
- Walter L. Brown, G
- Robert Burch, E
- T. Burke, E
- Edward C. Congdon, C
- Carroll Cooney, C
- Ted Coy, FB
- Tyson M. Dines, QB
- Noel M. S. Dunbar, T
- Graham Foster, T
- William Goebel, G
- Hagan, E
- Howard Jones, QB
- Tad Jones, QB
- Howard Linn, E
- Mitchell, HB
- Fred J. Murphy, HB
- H. Ray Paige, T
- Stephen Philbin, HB
- Pigott, E
- Thornton, T
- H. M. Wheaton, HB
- Edward A. G. Wylie, FB
