= John S. Hammond =

American sports executive (1880–1939)

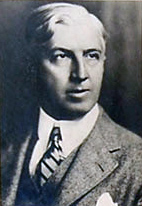
John Hammond in 1928

Col. John Stevens Hammond (December 5, 1880 – December 9, 1939) was an American sports executive who was the original sponsor and the first president of the New York Rangers franchise in the National Hockey League (NHL).

== Early life ==
Hammond was born in Crown Point, New York, on December 5, 1880, into a family of iron manufacturers. His great-grandfather, Charles F. Hammond, mined and forged plates for the USS Monitor and shipped the first cargo of lumber around Cape Horn. His grandfather, Brig. Gen. John Hammond served in the Union Army and a member of the United States House of Representatives. When the Hammond family's iron works began to suffer as a result of competition from Lake Superior iron ore, the family moved to Chicago.

== Military career ==
Hammond attended the United States Military Academy, where he excelled in the standing broad jump, 20-yard dash, and football. He also set a school record in the 220 hurdles. He graduated from West Point in 1905 and served as a military attache in Uruguay, Brazil, and Argentina. While in Argentina, Hammond met Tex Rickard. Hammond left the Army to join Rickard in his cattle and oil ventures. However, Hammond rejoined the Army during World War I as an artillery instructor.

== Madison Square Garden ==
After the war, Hammond worked as the South American representative for a New York brokerage firm. In 1922, Hammond rejoined Rickard, who was planning to build a new Madison Square Garden. Hammond used his Wall Street connections to help Rickard secure financing from his "600 millionaires". The arena was built at the cost of $4.75 million in 249 days and opened on December 15, 1925.

Hammond became vice president of Madison Square Garden Corporation and was tasked with finding new events to fill empty dates at the arena. One event Hammond suggested was hockey. Hammond and Rickard arranged with Thomas Duggan, who had purchased the rights for U.S.-based National Hockey League franchises, to place one in New York. Bootlegger Bill Dwyer purchased the franchise, which became the New York Americans. Dwyer remained behind the scenes, with Hammond serving as the team's president, Duggan as chairman of the board, and Tommy Gorman as the general manager.

Hockey proved to be a big draw in New York and the Madison Square Garden Corporation wanted to establish a second team, this one controlled by the Corporation itself. Hammond believed that the city was large enough to support two teams and hoped that a rivalry between the two would develop. On February 10, 1926, he resigned as president of the Americans to devote his time to organizing the new team, which became the New York Rangers. Hammond signed Conn Smythe, head coach of the University of Toronto's ice hockey team, to serve as general manager. On October 27, 1926, before the Rangers had played a regular-season game, Hammond fired Smythe in favour of Lester Patrick. Smythe believed Hammond fired him because of his refusal to sign two-time NHL scoring champion Babe Dye, against Hammond's wishes. In their second season, the Rangers won the 1928 Stanley Cup Final by defeating the Montreal Maroons three games to two.

In 1928, Hammond succeeded John M. Chapman as assistant general manager of Madison Square Garden. Rickard died on January 6, 1929, and the following day, Hammond was appointed by the board of directors to serve as acting general manager of the Garden. On March 19, 1929, William F. Carey, a railroad builder and contractor, was chosen to succeed Rickard and Hammond returned to his role as vice president.

On December 21, 1932, Hammond resigned as vice president of the Madison Square Garden Corporation and president of the New York Rangers, citing "disagreement with certain policies of the president [William F. Carey]". He was succeeded in both roles by Lester Patrick.

On May 2, 1934, Hammond announced that he and his associates had purchased controlling interest of Madison Square Garden from Richard F. Hoyt for an estimated $546,000. He succeeded Hoyt as chairman of the board and returned to his former position as Rangers' president. John Kilpatrick, who had succeeded Carey as president, stayed on in that role. By August 1935, however Hammond and Kilpatrick were fighting for control of the corporation. On September 27, 1935, stockholders voted 143,921 shares to 129,387 in favor of directors backing Kilpatrick. On October 2, Stanton Griffis was elected to succeed Hammond as chairman. On March 4, 1936, Griffis announced that Hammond and his associates had sold their shares to Hemphill, Noyes & Co.

== Personal life and death ==
In 1907, Hammond married Hester Reilly. They had two children - Orson Smith Hammond and John Hammond Jr. She died in 1927. Two years later, Hammond married Louise Schulze Pomeroy.

Hammond's four brothers, Thomas S. Hammond, Harry S. Hammond, Robert Hammond, and C. Herrick Hammond, were all noted amateur athletes.

Hammond died on December 9, 1939, at his residence at 270 Park Avenue. He was 59.

Preceded by Position created Lester Patrick	President of the New York Rangers; 1926–32; 1934–35	Succeeded by Lester Patrick; John Kilpatrick
