= Chris Hetherington =

American football player (born 1972)

No. 44, 41
- Position: Fullback

Personal information
- Born: November 27, 1972 (age 53); North Branford, Connecticut, U.S.
- Listed height: 6 ft 3 in (1.91 m)
- Listed weight: 245 lb (111 kg)

Career information
- High school: Old Farms (Avon, Connecticut)
- College: Yale
- NFL draft: 1996: undrafted

Career history
- Cincinnati Bengals (1996)*; Indianapolis Colts (1996–1998); Carolina Panthers (1999–2001); St. Louis Rams (2002); Oakland Raiders (2003–2004); San Francisco 49ers (2005–2006)
- * Offseason or practice squad member only

Career NFL statistics
- Rushing yards: 91
- Rushing average: 2.8
- Rushing touchdowns: 2
- Receptions: 50
- Receiving yards: 319
- Receiving touchdowns: 1
- Stats at Pro Football Reference

Chris Ray Hetherington (born November 27, 1972) is an American former professional football player who was a fullback in the National Football League (NFL). He played college football for the Yale Bulldogs. Hetherington was signed as an undrafted free agent by the Cincinnati Bengals in 1996. He then played for the Indianapolis Colts from 1996 to 1998. He was then signed by the Carolina Panthers from 1999 to 2002. He then played for the St. Louis Rams in 2002. He then played for the Oakland Raiders in 2003 and 2004. He was then signed by the San Francisco 49ers in 2005.

Hetherington is one of several professional sports alumni of both Avon Old Farms school in Avon, Connecticut and Yale. At Avon, he was coached by Kevin Driscoll and was a three-sport standout (in baseball, ice hockey, and football). After graduating in 1991, he moved to Yale, where starred in football as starting quarterback and holds numerous passing records. He also played baseball at Yale, before graduating in 1995.
