= Ted Coy =

American football player and coach (1888–1935)

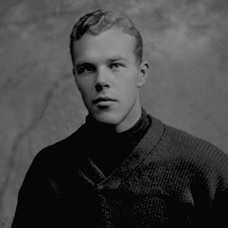

Biographical details
- Born: May 23, 1888; Andover, Massachusetts, U.S.
- Died: September 8, 1935 (aged 47); New York, New York, U.S.

Playing career
- 1907–1909: Yale
- Position: Fullback

Coaching career (HC unless noted)
- 1910: Yale

Head coaching record
- Overall: 6–2–2

Accomplishments and honors

Championships
- 2× National (1907, 1909)

Awards
- 3× Consensus All-American (1907, 1908, 1909); Camp All-time All-America team; Thorpe All-time All-America team
- College Football Hall of Fame; Inducted in 1951 (profile)

Edward Harris Coy (May 23, 1888 – September 8, 1935) was an American football player and coach. Coy was selected as a first-team All-American three straight years from 1907 to 1909 and was later selected as the fullback on Walter Camp's All-Time All-America team. He also served as Yale's head football coach in 1910. In 1951, Coy was inducted into the College Football Hall of Fame as part of its inaugural class.

== Early years ==
Coy was the son of the first headmaster at The Hotchkiss School in Lakeville, Connecticut, and began his education at Hotchkiss.

== Yale University ==
He then enrolled at Yale University in 1906. While attending Yale, Coy was also secretly a member of The Yale Whiffenpoofs, the oldest collegiate a cappella group in the United States. Coy was described as "a song lover with a good ear and a nice tenor voice." To "cover the heresy" of his joining the Whiffenpoofs, he was given the title "Perpetual Guest." He also became a member of Skull and Bones.

=== Football ===
Coy became recognized as one of the greatest football players in the history of the game. It was reportedly "a familiar sight when Ted would burst through an enemy defense, his long blonde hair held back by a white sweatband." George Trevor once described Coy as "a leonine figure, with a pug nose and a shock of yellow hair like a Gloucester fisher girl." He ran "with a high-knee action." He stood 6 feet tall and weighed 195 pounds.

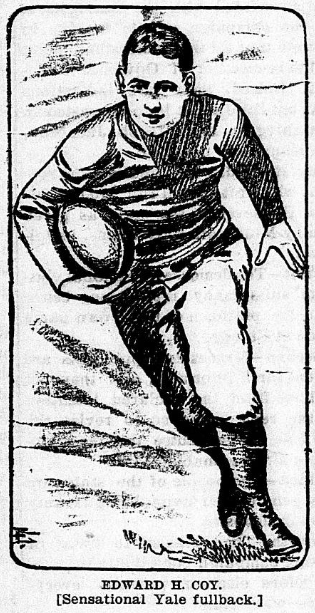
Depiction of Coy carrying the ball

Coy was named a first-team All-American in all three years in which he played varsity football at Yale. During those three seasons, Yale lost only one game, a 4–0 loss to Harvard in 1908.

As a senior in 1909, Coy led the Yale team to an undefeated 10–0 record, outscoring opponents 209–0. Coy missed the first four games of the 1909 season after undergoing an appendectomy, but he returned to lead Yale to victories over Army, Princeton, and Harvard. In December 2008, Sports Illustrated undertook to identify the individuals who would have been awarded the Heisman Trophy in college football's early years, before the trophy was established. Coy was selected as the would-be Heisman winner for the 1909 season. The National Football Foundation did the same, and also chose Coy in 1909. Coy was selected by Walter Camp as the fullback for his All-time All-America team. He was listed third-team on Outing's All-time All-American. Leland Devore once said Jim Thorpe "smashes into the line like a pair of Coys."

=== Coaching career ===
In the fall of 1910, Coy returned to New Haven as Yale's football coach. The 1910 team finished with a record of 6–2–2, including a tie with Vanderbilt. It was the first time Yale had been held scoreless at home, and the south's first great showing against an Eastern power. "It is needless to say that I was greatly surprised and disappointed at the result. But for all that, I have no excuses to make." said Coy.

== Personal life ==
After a year coaching Yale's football team, Coy began a business career as a stock broker and in the insurance business. He also wrote football articles for the New York World, Boston Globe, San Francisco Herald, and St. Nicholas Magazine.

Coy's first wife, Sophie Meldrim, divorced him in 1925.

In 1925, Coy was secretly married to the noted stage actress Jeanne Eagels. At the time, Coy was employed by a New York City insurance firm, Smythe, Sanford & Gerard, and was one of the most admired men in the United States. Coy's marriage to Eagels was rocky, and Eagels had a reputation for drinking and erratic behavior. Eagels sued for divorce in February 1928 on grounds of cruelty, alleging that Coy had assaulted her, had broken her jaw and threatened her with the words (to) "ruin that beautiful face of yours"(Eagels) in order to stop the forward progress of her movie career. Coy pleaded no contest in the divorce action and moved to Texas. Eagels died the following year at age 39 from an overdose of heroin.

In August 1928, Coy married his third wife, 21-year-old Lottie Bruhn of El Paso, Texas. Coy died in September 1935 at age 47. Several months after his death, Time magazine ran a story about Coy's widow selling his most prized possessions to a pawnshop:

"Into an Oklahoma City pawnshop stepped a pretty young woman to borrow money on a wedding ring, a gold medal, a gold football, a pin of Yale's famed Skull & Bones Society. Each was engraved: E. H. COY—YALE U. 'Could it be Ted Coy, the Yale athlete?' ventured the pawnbroker. Yes,' said the girl, 'I am his wife.' Last week, as the pawnbroker wrote to Skull & Bones in New Haven which immediately bought Coy's relics, newshawks hustled around to see Lottie Bruhn Coy, found her working as a servant. Said she: 'Yes, I'm Mrs. Ted Coy. How on earth did you find me here? … I haven't any money. … Once I went five days in this town without a bite to eat. . . . I thank God for a sense of humor. If I didn't have it I'd have been bad off these months since Ted died. …'"

Coy was a boyhood hero of F. Scott Fitzgerald, and the character Ted Fay in Fitzgerald's 1928 short story "The Freshest Boy" was loosely based on Coy.

== Head coaching record ==
Year	Team	Overall	Conference	Standing	Bowl/playoffs
Yale Bulldogs (Independent) (1910)
1910	Yale	6–2–2			
Yale:		6–2–2			
Total:		6–2–2			
