= Surdna Foundation =

Charitable organisation

- Formation: 1917
- Type: Charitable foundation
- Headquarters: New York City, United States
- President: Don Chen
- Key people: Marc Vincent de Venoge; Betsy Fader
- Revenue: $86,286,051 (2015)
- Expenses: $50,459,623 (2015)
- Website: http://www.surdna.org

The Surdna Foundation is a charitable foundation established in 1917 by John Emory Andrus to pursue a range of philanthropic purposes.

== History ==
A devoted family man with nine children, Andrus founded the Julia Dyckman Andrus Memorial in 1928 as a tribute to his beloved wife. She had been orphaned as a child, and in her honor Andrus bought a farm in Westchester County, New York, in order to establish an orphanage. The Memorial later changed its name to the Surdna Foundation, with "Surdna" being the backward spelling of the family name Andrus.

In 1953 Andrus' youngest child, Helen Benedict, was serving as the chairman of Surdna. That year the foundation built the John E. Andrus Memorial, a retirement home for 200 elderly residents on land adjacent to the Julia Dyckman Andrus Memorial. She and the Foundation thereby completed his expressed wish that his legacy provide "opportunity for youth and rest for old age". In the early 1970s, the board of the Julia Dyckman Andrus Memorial shifted its programmatic emphasis to serve as a residential treatment, special education and diagnostic center for emotionally disabled children.

== Funding ==
Family stewardship of Surdna over the years has been informed by Andrus's values: thrift, practicality, modesty, loyalty, excellence and an appreciation for direct service to those in need. These values have been applied both to oversight of the two Memorials and to more general grant programs. In 1989, the third and fourth generations of the Andrus family on the Surdna board established programs in Environment and Community Revitalization and decided to enlarge the professional staff to broaden the Foundation's effectiveness. In 1994, programs in Effective Citizenry and the Arts were added. The Nonprofit Sector Support Program was added in 1997 to address crosscutting issues affecting the sector.

In 2019 some descendants of John Emory Andrus questioned whether the foundation had deviated from Andrus's original goals and stated that the foundation was planning on focusing all its efforts on racial equity.

== Successes ==
The Comprehensive Community Revitalization Program (CCRP) was a $10 million effort by 21 foundations and corporations (initiated by the Surdna Foundation in 1991). Its goal was to materially boost the quality of life in a large swath of the South Bronx, to support a group of CDCs by buying into their agenda for doing so, and to (later) create an institution that could live on vigorously and independently after the program formally concluded in 1998.

== See also ==
- Youth activism
- Civic engagement
