= Wayland Minot =

American football player (1889–1957)

- Minot, circa 1910

Profile
- Position: Halfback

Personal information
- Born: October 23, 1889; Cambridge, Massachusetts, U.S.
- Died: November 20, 1957 (aged 68); Belmont, Massachusetts, U.S.

Career information
- College: Harvard

Awards and highlights
- National champion (1910); Consensus All-American (1909); First-team All-Service (1917)

Wayland Manning Minot (October 23, 1889 – November 20, 1957) was an American football player. He played college football at Harvard University and was selected as a consensus All-American at the center position in 1909.

Minot was married in 1913 to Anna Marie Shaughnessy. They had five children, Ruth (born 1914), Wayland Jr. (born 1915), Anna (born 1918), Elizabeth (born 1922), and Herbert (born 1925). In the late 1920s, he lived in Cambridge, Massachusetts, and served as Parks Commissioner. In 1930, Cambridge Mayor Richard M. Russell nominated Minot to serve as City Treasurer, but his nomination was rejected by the City Council. Minot later became an investment counselor in Boston, Massachusetts.

In January 1933, Minot was involved in a late night motor vehicle accident resulting in the death of one of his passengers. He crashed into a draw bridge of the Charles River Dam Bridge, and the vehicle burned. Minot was placed under arrest and charged with manslaughter. Although a police officer testified that the smell of liquor was on Minot's breath, he did not believe Minot was under the influence, and Minot was found not guilty of manslaughter.

Minot died in November 1957 at his home in Belmont, Massachusetts.
