= Adrian Regnier =

American football player and coach (1889–1956)

Biographical details
- Born: August 28, 1889
- Died: March 2, 1956 (aged 66); Wilbraham, Massachusetts, U.S.

Playing career
- 1907–1909: Brown
- Positions: End, halfback

Coaching career (HC unless noted)
- 1910: Union (NY)

Head coaching record
- Overall: 2–4–1

Accomplishments and honors

Awards
- Consensus All-American (1909)

Adrian E. Regnier (August 28, 1889 – March 2, 1956) was an American college football player and coach. He played at Brown University at the halfback and end positions from 1907 to 1909. He was the captain of the 1909 Brown Bears football team and was a consensus selection on the 1909 College Football All-America Team at the end position. Regnier also played baseball and basketball and was a member of the Phi Delta Theta fraternity. He graduated from Brown in 1910.

In April 1910, Regnier was hired as the football coach at Union College. He served one year as the head coach of the Union Garnet football team, compiling a record of 2–4–1.

During World War I, he served in the United States Army. He was injured in approximately May 1918 while serving in a machine gun battalion of the New England Division. He later became a sales engineer. He died in March 1956, at Springfield Hospital in Wilbraham, Massachusetts.

== Head coaching record ==
Year	Team	Overall	Conference	Standing	Bowl/playoffs
Union Garnet (Independent) (1910)
1910	Union	2–4–1			
Union:		2–4–1			
Total:		2–4–1			
