= Clark Tobin =

American football player and coach (1887–1952)

Dartmouth Big Green
- Position: Guard

Personal information
- Born: January 1, 1887; Boston, Massachusetts, U.S.
- Died: January 25, 1952 (aged 65); South Orange, New Jersey, U.S.

Career information
- College: Dartmouth (1909–1910)

Awards and highlights
- Consensus All-American (1908); Second-team All-American (1909)

Clark W. Tobin (January 1, 1887 – January 25, 1952) was an American college football player and coach.

== Biography ==
Tobin played college football at Dartmouth College in 1909 and 1910. He was the captain of the 1909 Dartmouth football team and was selected as a first-team All-American at the guard position in 1909. Tobin also served as the head football coach at Tufts College in 1911.

Tobin was a native of South Boston. During World War I, he served as a captain in the infantry of the United States Army Reserve at Camp Meade. He later served as an executive vice president and sales manager for Propper-McCallum Hostery Company, Inc., in New York. Tobin died in 1952 at age 65.
