= Larry Vorhis =

American football player and coach (1888–1918)

Biographical details
- Born: 1888; Allegany County, New York, U.S.
- Died: December 1, 1918; Wilkes-Barre, Pennsylvania, U.S.

Playing career
- 1906–1909: Penn State
- Position: Quarterback

Coaching career (HC unless noted)
- 1910–1911: Wesleyan

Head coaching record
- Overall: 8–8–2

Lawrence Folsom Vorhis (1888 – December 1, 1918) was an American college football player and coach. He played football for the Penn State from 1906 to 1909 and was selected as a first-team All-American in 1909. Vorhis served as the head football coach at Wesleyan University from 1910 to 1911, compiling a record of 8–8–2.

== Athlete ==
Vorhis played football for Penn State from 1906 to 1909. He was the team's quarterback and also handled drop kicking responsibilities. He was selected as a first-team All-American in 1909 by the New York Herald (as an end), New York Mail (as a quarterback), William B. Hanna in the New York Sun, the Philadelphia Press (as a quarterback) and the Philadelphia Public Ledger.

== Coach ==
After graduating from Penn State, Vorhis served as the head football coach at Wesleyan University in 1910 and 1911. In his two seasons as Wesleyan's head football coach, Vorhis compiled a record of 8–8–2. In December 1911, Vorhis announced that he would not return to Wesleyan in 1912. He stated that he intended to operate a sugar plantation in Alabama.

== Death ==
Vorhis died on December 1, 1918, in Wilkes-Barre, Pennsylvania, following a short illness.

== Head coaching record ==
Year	Team	Overall	Conference	Standing	Bowl/playoffs
Wesleyan Methodists (Independent) (1910–1911)
1910	Wesleyan	4–4–1			
1911	Wesleyan	4–4–1			
Wesleyan:		8–8–2			
Total:		8–8–2			
