= Clarence Alcott =

American football player, coach, and banker (1886–1957)

Profile
- Position: End

Personal information
- Born: August 9, 1886
- Died: October 23, 1957 (aged 71)

Career information
- College: Yale University

Awards and highlights
- National champion (1907); Consensus All-American (1907); Second-team All-American (1906)

Clarence F. Alcott (August 9, 1886 – October 23, 1957) was an American football player, coach and investment banker. He was selected as an All-American end in both 1906 and 1907.

Alcott attended University School in Cleveland, Ohio where he was a prep standout before attending Yale University, where he played at the end position from 1905 to 1907. During the 1906 and 1907 seasons, the first in which the forward pass was legal, Alcott developed a reputation as one of the sport's best pass receivers. In 1916, The New York Times wrote that he "was one of Yale's most spectacular ends, especially in handling the forward pass."

In Yale's 6-0 victory over Harvard in November 1906, Alcott scored the game's only points on a touchdown pass from Paul Veeder. Though it was neither the first nor the longest pass of the 1906 season, the Veeder-to-Alcott pass in the Harvard game was the most publicized pass in the first season of forward passing. Some publications refer to the touchdown pass from Veeder to Alcott in the 1906 Harvard game as the "first forward pass in a major game." In his book, "A Century of The Game: Yale-Harvard Is a Matter of Pride,' Al Morganti claimed that "the first significant use of the forward pass in a major game, a 20-yard gain on a Paul Veeder-to-Clarence Alcoft pass in The Game of 190." Writing in The Washington Post, Sally Jenkins called it one of the few significant forward passes thrown in the first season of the forward pass.

In fact, Eddie Cochems's 1906 St. Louis University team built its offense around the forward pass in 1906. One of the top football officials in the country, West Point's Lt. Horatio B. Hackett officiated at Harvard, Yale and St. Louis University games in 1906. After watching St. Louis play, Hackett told a reporter, "It was the most perfect exhibition... of the new rules ... that I have seen all season and much better than that of Yale and Harvard. St. Louis' style of pass differs entirely from that in use in the east. ... The St. Louis university players shoot the ball hard and accurately to the man who is to receive it ... The fast throw by St. Louis enables the receiving player to dodge the opposing players, and it struck me as being all but perfect."

At the end of the 1906 season, Alcott was selected as a second-team All-American by Caspar Whitney for Outing magazine In 1907, he was selected as a first-team All-American by Walter Camp in Collier's Weekly.

After graduating from Yale in 1908, Alcott served on Yale's football coaching staff from 1908 until at least 1919. He also served on Yale's Football Committee, responsible for setting football policy, starting in 1920.

Alcott later became an investment banker on Wall Street in New York. He retired in 1935 and died in October 1957.
