= Stephen Philbin =

American football player (1888–1973)

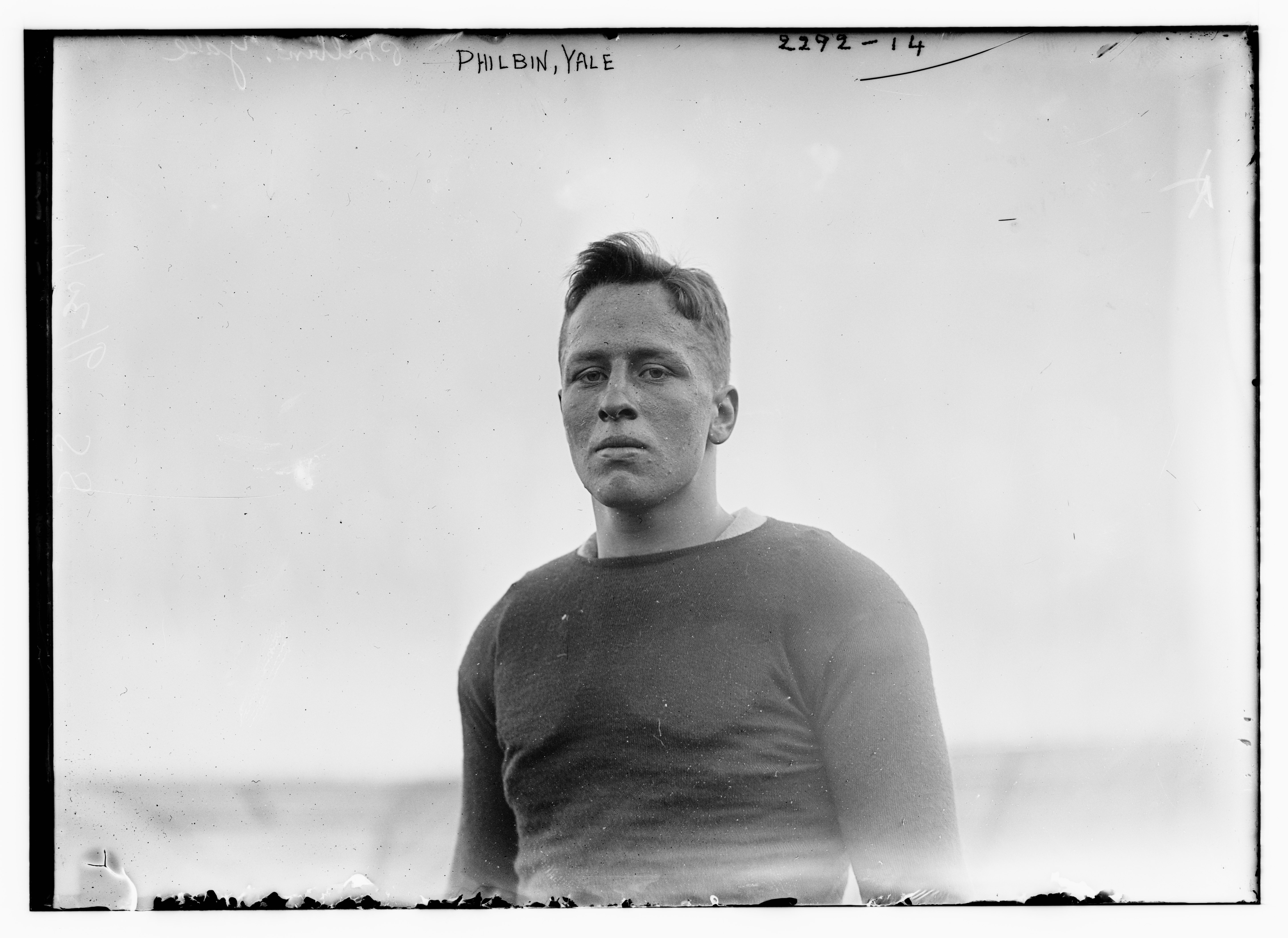

Profile
- Position: Fullback/Halfback

Personal information
- Born: June 7, 1888; Manhattan, New York, U.S.
- Died: November 13, 1973 (aged 85); Old Lyme, Connecticut, U.S.

Career information
- College: Yale University (1907–1910)

Awards and highlights
- 2× National champion (1907, 1909); Consensus All-American (1909)

Stephen Holladay Philbin (June 7, 1888 – November 13, 1973) was an American football player. He played college football at Yale University and was selected as a consensus All-American at the halfback position in 1909. Philbin was also captain of the Yale Bulldogs baseball team and a member of Skull and Bones.

After graduating from Yale, Philbin attended Harvard Law School, graduating in 1913. After receiving his degree, he practiced for three years with a law firm in Dallas, Texas. In 1916, he joined the New York firm of Fish, Richardson & Neave as a patent lawyer. He spent most of his career with that firm. During World War I, he served with the Army Signal Corps in a unit commanded by Fiorello La Guardia in Foggia, Italy. During World War II, while La Guardia was mayor of New York, Philbin served as the general counsel of the city's Civil Defense Volunteer Office.

Philbin died in November 1973 at his summer home in Old Lyme, Connecticut.
