= John Kilpatrick (American athlete) =

American athlete, soldier, and sports businessperson (1889–1960)

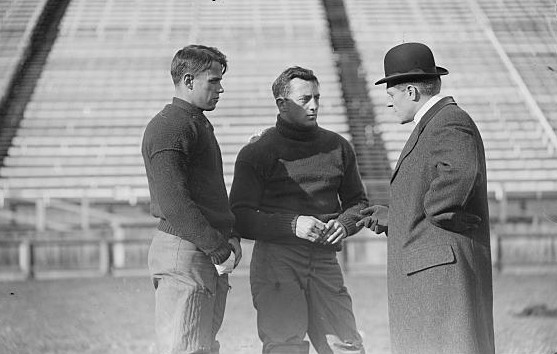
- John Kilpatrick (center) on field with Walter Logan and Ralph Bloomer, Yale University 1909

Yale Bulldogs
- Position: End

Personal information
- Born: June 15, 1889; New York City, U.S.
- Died: May 7, 1960 (aged 70); New York City, U.S.

Career information
- High school: Andover Academy (Andover, MA)

Awards and highlights
- National champion (1909); 2× Consensus All-American (1909, 1910)
- College Football Hall of Fame (Class of 1955)

John Reed Kilpatrick (June 15, 1889 – May 7, 1960) was an American athlete, soldier, and sports businessperson. He is a member of the Hockey Hall of Fame and College Football Hall of Fame.

Kilpatrick was born to a Canadian mother and American father, raised in New York City, and later attended Yale University. He competed in football and track and field, and was recognized as one of the top players of the era. After college, he worked in New York City before being drafted to serve in the United States Army in World War I. During this service, he won several honors including the Distinguished Service Medal. After the war, he commenced a successful business career in New York that led him to becoming the president of the Madison Square Garden Corporation.

Kilpatrick ran Madison Square Garden for more than twenty-five years, personally overseeing the operations of the New York Rangers NHL club from 1935 to 1960. The Rangers won the Stanley Cup in 1940 while he was in charge. Kilpatrick introduced a number of other professional events at Madison Square Garden, such as ice shows and, with the assistance of Ned Irish, college and professional basketball player. In 1936, he was elected an NHL Governor.

In June 1942, Kilpatrick was recalled to active military duty to serve in World War II and was promoted to brigadier general. He retired from the army in 1949 and resumed his career at Madison Square Garden.

Kilpatrick continued to make contributions to the sport of ice hockey, including establishing the National Hockey League Pension Society in 1947. Posthumously, he was elected to the Hockey Hall of Fame in 1960, and in 1968, he received the Lester Patrick Trophy for outstanding service to hockey in the United States.

Kilpatrick competed in the hurdles and all-around events in track & field for Andover and later Yale. He was captain on both teams.

Preceded by John S. Hammond	President of the New York Rangers; 1935–1960	Succeeded by John J. Bergen
