= Daniel Pullen =

American football player and US Army officer (1885–1923)

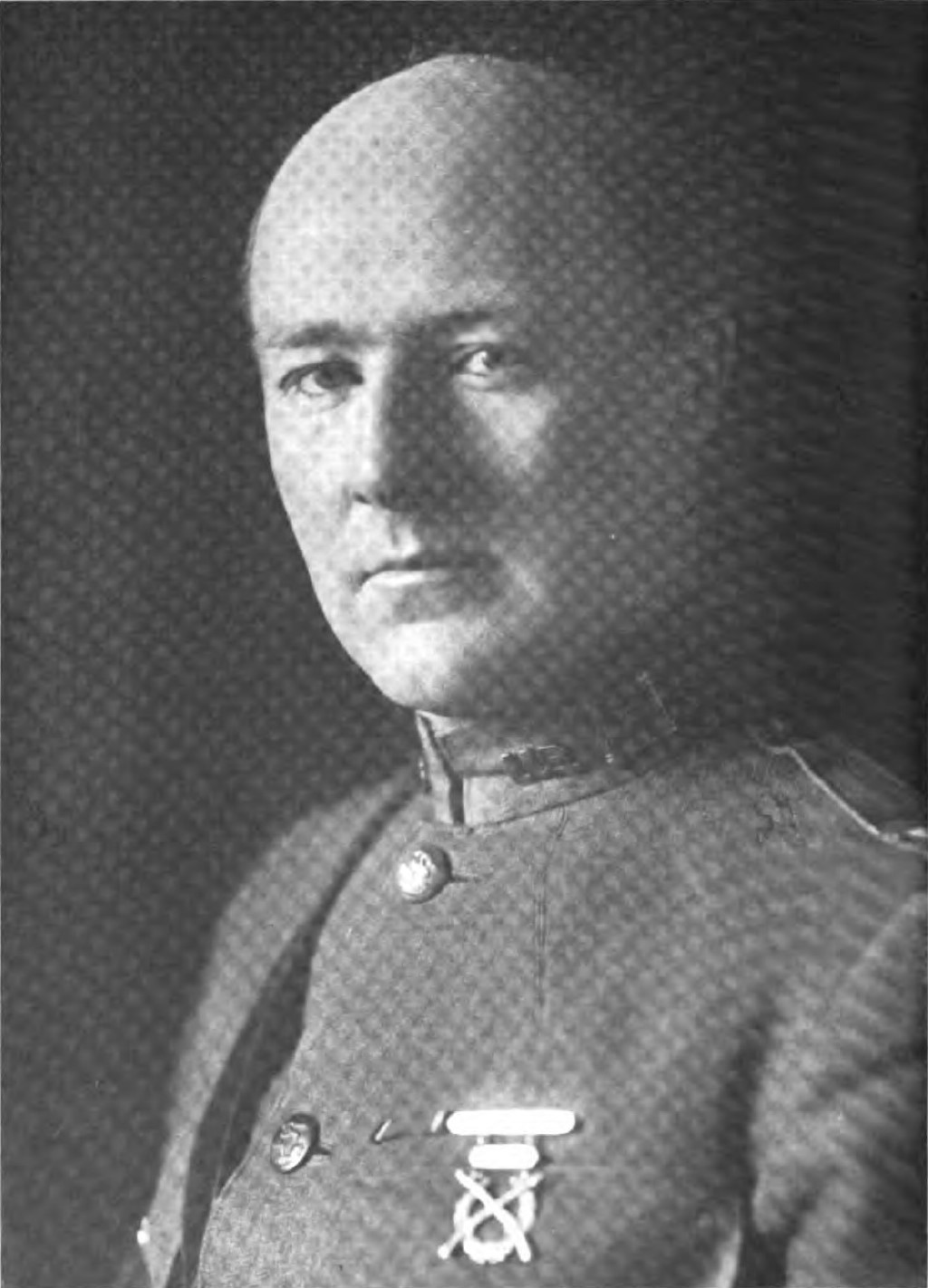
- Born: April 27, 1885; La Push, Washington, U.S.
- Died: September 22, 1923 (aged 38); Washington, D.C., U.S.
- Football career

Army Black Knights
- Position: Tackle

Career information
- College: Washington, Army

Signature
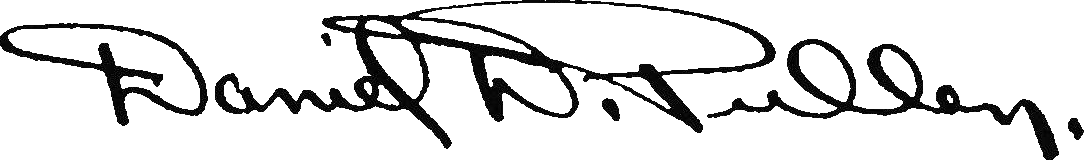

Daniel Dee Pullen (April 27, 1885 – September 22, 1923) was an American football player and an officer in the United States Army.

== Biography ==
Pullen was born in La Push, Washington, the second of four children and oldest of three sons born to Harriet (née Smith; 1860–1947) and Daniel Webster Pullen. The family moved to Skagway, Alaska in 1897 after the death of the elder Daniel Pullen. He attended the University of Washington, where he played college football. He then enrolled in the United States Military Academy where he gained fame as a tackle for the Army Black Knights football team. He was selected as a first-team All-American in 1906 by the New York World (chosen by Robert W. Edgren), and in 1908 by T. A. Dwight Jones, Fielding H. Yost, and the Kansas City Journal.

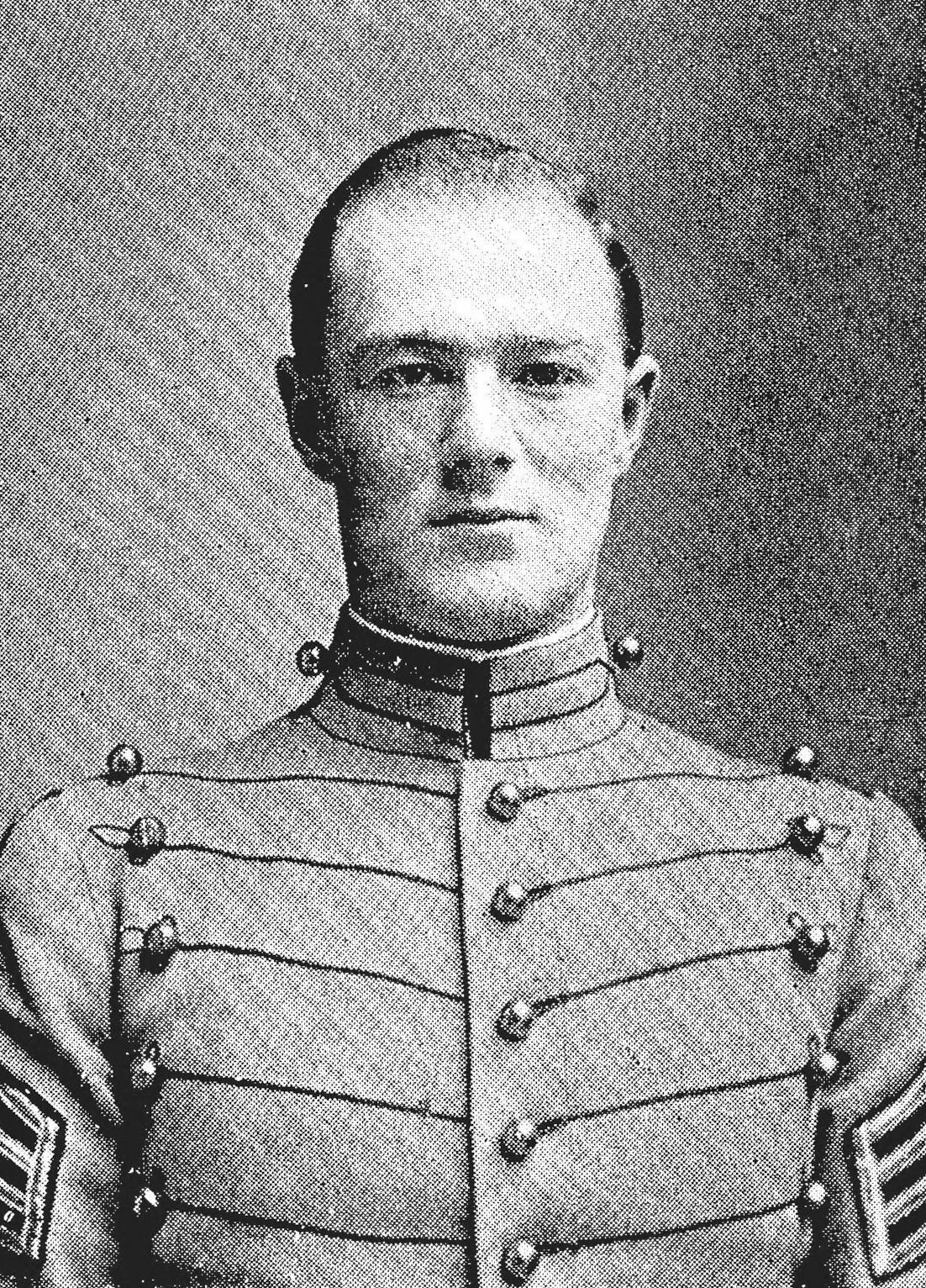
At West Point in 1910

Pullen received a Distinguished Service Cross for his service in World War I. According to the citation, he displayed "extraordinary heroism in action" and "conspicuous gallantry and leadership in directing a tank attack on the Bois-de-Cuisy, after which he rallied a force of disorganized infantry, leading it forward in the face of violent machine-gun fire, and occupying the ground which had been taken by the tanks." Pullen was a captain in the Army Corps of Engineers before the war, but received temporary promotions to major, lieutenant colonel and then, on October 17, 1918, to colonel. After the war, he reverted to his permanent rank on March 22, 1920, but then received a permanent promotion to major on April 12, 1920.

Pullen died in 1923 at age 38 at the Walter Reed Army Medical Center, following an illness of several months. He was buried at Arlington National Cemetery.
