= Carroll Cooney =

American athlete (1887–1947)

Profile
- Positions: Center, Guard

Personal information
- Born: April 1, 1887
- Died: August 15, 1947 (aged 60)

Career information
- College: Yale (1909)

Awards and highlights
- National champion (1909); Consensus All-American (1909)

Carroll Trowbridge Cooney (April 1, 1887 – August 15, 1947) was an American football and squash player and a competitor in the hammer throw.

Cooney played college football at Yale University from 1907 to 1909 at the center and guard positions. He was selected as a consensus All-American at the center position in 1909. Cooney also participated in the hammer throw for Yale's track and field team. In April 1908, he exceeded the world record with a throw of 161 feet, but the throw did not qualify as a world record as it was not made in competition.

In the late 1910s and 1920s, Cooney became an accomplished squash player. In December 1917, he won the handicap squash tennis championship at the Yale Club of New York City. The New York Times reported that, despite Cooney's weight (275 pounds), he was "agile on his feet, covering court well, and hit with a force that was baffling to [his opponent]."

In the late 1920s, Cooney was the vice president of a New York lumber company (Cooney, Eckstein & Co., Inc.) while also running a professional dance orchestra at night, playing squash at the Yale Club and serving on its board of governors. The New York Times ran a story about Cooney's orchestra in 1927 in which Cooney noted that music had been his hobby all his life, playing the saxophone, mandolin, violin, and a few other instruments. He emphasized, however, that his band was not a jazz band: "We play rhythms but not jazz. That is, we save the melody."

In 1936, Cooney built the Waldo Theatre in Waldoboro, Maine.

Cooney died in 1947 at age 60. His son, Carroll T. Cooney Jr., was a writer of popular children's books and the president and chairman of the Vocaline Company in the 1950s and 1960s.
