= John Emory Andrus =

American politician (1841–1934)

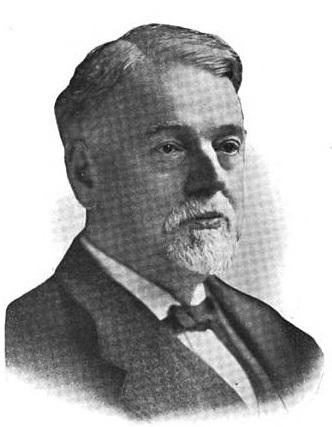

Member of the U.S. House of Representatives from New York's 19th district
- In office March 4, 1905 – March 3, 1913
- Preceded by: Norton P. Otis
- Succeeded by: Walter M. Chandler

22nd Mayor of Yonkers
- In office 1903

Personal details
- Born: February 16, 1841 Pleasantville, New York, US
- Died: December 26, 1934 (aged 93) Yonkers, New York, US
- Party: Republican
- Spouse: Julia M. Dyckman Andrus
- Children: Mary Dyckman May Andrus; William Loyal Andrus; Edith Jefferson Andrus; Margaret Palmer Andrus; Jesamine Andrus; John Emory Andrus; Hamlin Foster Andrus; Ida Bourne Andrus; Helen Whittier Andrus
- Education: Wesleyan University

John Emory Andrus (February 16, 1841 – December 26, 1934) was the mayor of Yonkers, New York, a U.S. congressman from New York, and founder of the SURDNA Foundation.

== Biography ==
Born in Pleasantville, New York, Andrus was the son of Methodist Minister, Loyal B. Andrus and Ann (Palmer) Andrus. He attended Charlotteville Seminary in Schoharie County, New York, and graduated from Wesleyan University in 1862. He married Julia Maria Dyckman on June 23, 1869. They had nine children, Mary, William, Edith, Margaret, Jesamine, John, Hamlin, Ida, and Helen.

== Career ==
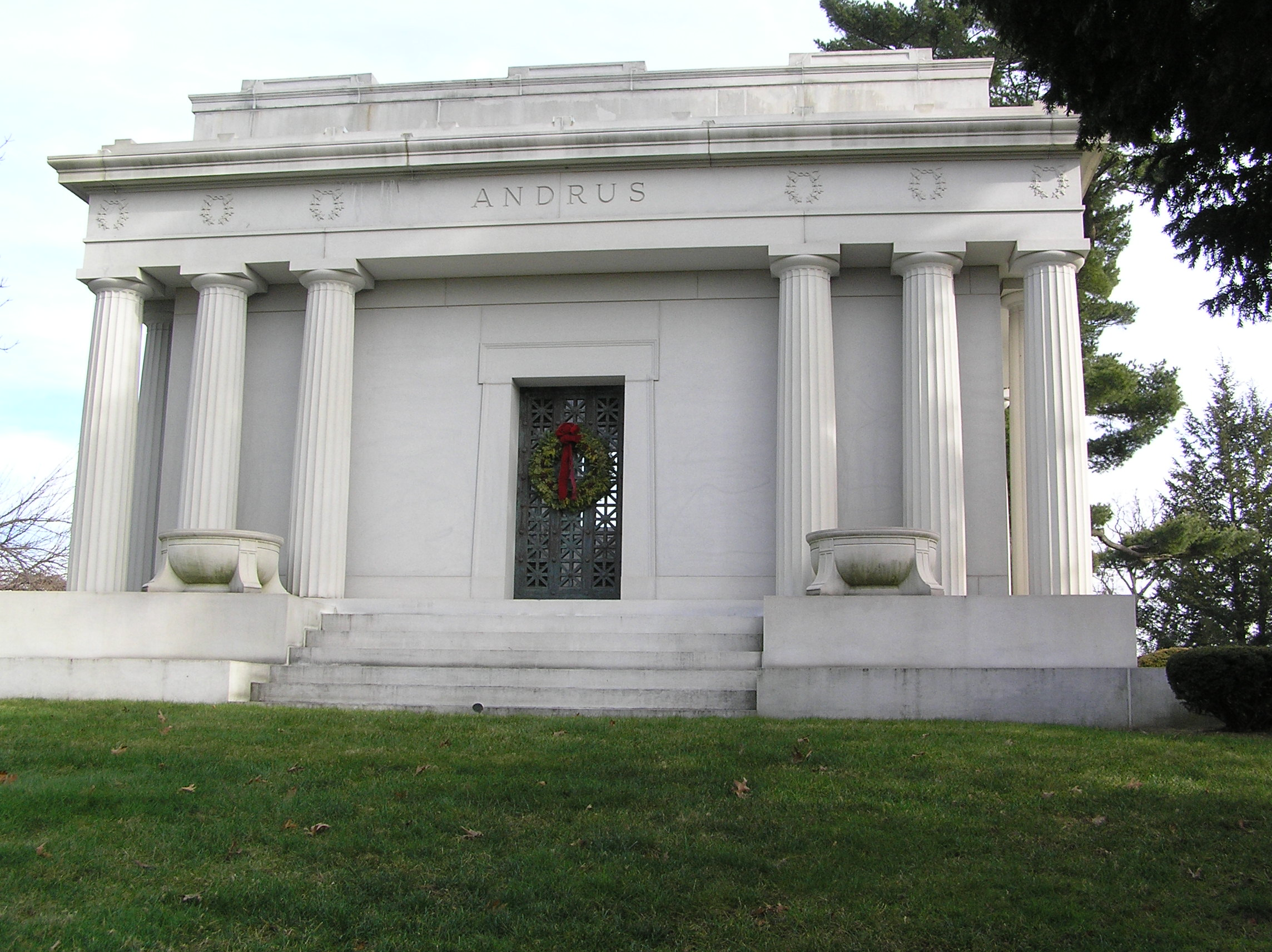
The mausoleum of John Andrus

Andrus taught school in New Jersey for four years and then pursued his talents as an investor and businessman. His primary operating business, the Arlington Chemical Company, manufactured typical medicines of the late 1800s and distributed them worldwide. He was an investor in railroads and utilities, as well as real estate, mining claims, and the Standard Oil Company. He was director of the New York Life Insurance Company.

Andrus' extraordinary skills, however, lay in finding and purchasing undervalued assets, usually in partnership with a knowledgeable operator. His holdings included several buildings and land in Minneapolis, Minnesota, large timber tracts in California, mineral-rich acres in New Mexico as well as significant land holdings in Florida, New Jersey and Alaska. He served as president of the New York Pharmaceutical Association, and of the Palisade Manufacturing Co. of Yonkers, Westchester County. He was elected mayor of Yonkers in 1903.

In 1904, Andrus was elected as the representative of New York's 19th congressional district as a Republican to the 59th United States Congress and to the three succeeding Congresses, serving from March 4, 1905, to March 3, 1913. He was not a candidate for renomination in 1912, and resumed his former business pursuits in Yonkers, New York, until his death. He was active as a lay leader of the Methodist Church and held a long-term post as a trustee of Wesleyan University. An early sound interview of Andrus exists, recorded on February 27, 1930, in which he's asked about his health, opinion on the recent Wall Street crash of 1929, and thoughts on aging.

== Death and Legacy ==
Andrus died of pneumonia in Yonkers, Westchester County, New York, on December 26, 1934 (age 93 years, 313 days). He is interred in a private Corinthian mausoleum at Kensico Cemetery, Valhalla, New York.

In 1917, he established the Surdna Foundation to carry on a range of philanthropic purposes.

U.S. House of Representatives
Preceded by Norton P. Otis	Member of the U.S. House of Representatives from New York's 19th congressional district March 4, 1905 – March 3, 1913	Succeeded by Walter M. Chandler
