= Cleveland Stadium =

Former stadium in Cleveland, Ohio, US

- Municipal Stadium; Cleveland Municipal Stadium
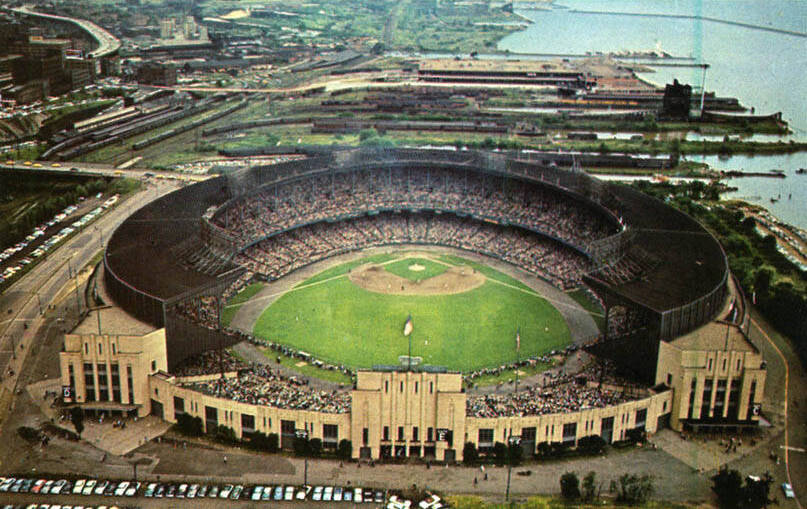
- The stadium in 1955 in baseball configuation
- Interactive map of Cleveland Stadium
- Address: 1085 West 3rd Street; Cleveland; United States
- Owner: City of Cleveland
- Operator: City of Cleveland (1931–1973); Cleveland Stadium Corporation (1973–1995)
- Capacity: Baseball: 74,438 (1993) originally 78,000 (1932); Football: 81,000 (1995)
- Surface: Natural grass
- Field size: Left Field – 322 ft (98 m); Left-Center – 385 ft (117 m); Center Field – 400 ft (122 m); Right-Center – 385 ft (117 m); Right Field – 322 ft (98 m); Backstop – 60 ft (18 m)
- Cleveland Municipal Stadium
- U.S. National Register of Historic Places
- Location within Cleveland Location within Ohio Location within the United States
- Coordinates: 41°30′24″N 81°41′50″W
- NRHP reference No.: 87002287
- Added to NRHP: November 13, 1987
- Public transit: Union Depot (1931–1953)

Construction
- Groundbreaking: June 24, 1930
- Opened: July 1, 1931
- Renovated: 1947 (inner fence installed); 1967 (new seats); 1974 (new scoreboard, suites)
- Closed: December 17, 1995
- Demolished: November 4, 1996-Early 1997
- Cost: US$3 million ($63.5 million in 2025 dollars)
- Architects: Walker & Weeks; Osborn Engineering Company
- General contractor: Biltmore Construction

Tenants
- Cleveland Indians (MLB) 1932–1933, 1937–1993; Cleveland Browns (AAFC/NFL) 1946–1995; Cleveland Rams (AFL/NFL) 1936, 1939–1941; Cleveland Indians (NFL) 1931; Western Reserve Red Cats (NCAA) 1933; John Carroll Blue Streaks (NCAA) 1933–1942, 1946–1951; Cleveland Stokers (NASL) 1967–1968; Great Lakes Bowl (NCAA) 1947

Cleveland Stadium, commonly known as Municipal Stadium or Cleveland Municipal Stadium, was a multi-purpose stadium in Cleveland, Ohio. It was one of the early multi-purpose stadiums, built to accommodate both baseball and football. The stadium opened in 1931 and is best known as the long-time home of the Cleveland Indians of Major League Baseball (MLB), from 1932 to 1933 and again from 1937 to 1993 (including 1937–1946 when games were split between League Park and Cleveland Stadium), and the Cleveland Browns of the National Football League (NFL), from 1946 to 1995, in addition to hosting other teams, other sports, and concerts. The stadium hosted three AAFC Championship Games, six NFL Championship Games, served as one of the host venues of the 1948 and 1954 World Series to go along with being a four-time host of the Major League Baseball All-Star Game and the site of the original Dawg Pound, Red Right 88, and The Drive.

Through most of its tenure as a baseball facility, the stadium was the largest in Major League Baseball by seating capacity, seating over 78,000 initially and over 74,000 in its final years. It was superseded only by the Los Angeles Memorial Coliseum from 1958 to 1961, while it was the temporary home of the Los Angeles Dodgers, and by Mile High Stadium in 1993, the temporary home of the expansion Colorado Rockies. For football, the stadium seated approximately 80,000 people, ranking as one of the larger seating capacities in the NFL.

Former Browns owner Art Modell took over control of the stadium from the city in the 1970s and while his organization made improvements to the facility, it continued to decline. The Indians played their final game at the stadium in October 1993 and moved to Jacobs Field the following season. Although plans were announced to renovate the stadium for use by the Browns, in 1995 Modell announced his intentions to move the team to Baltimore citing the state of Cleveland Stadium as a major factor. The Browns played their final game at the stadium in December 1995, after which they were renamed the Baltimore Ravens. As part of an agreement between Modell, the city of Cleveland, and the NFL, the Browns were officially deactivated for three seasons and the city was required to construct a new stadium on the Cleveland Stadium site. Cleveland Stadium was demolished in 1996 to make way for Cleveland Browns Stadium, which opened in 1999. Much of the debris from the demolition was placed in Lake Erie to create an artificial reef.

== History ==
The impetus for Cleveland Stadium came from city manager William R. Hopkins, Cleveland Indians' president Ernest Barnard, real estate magnate and future Indians' president Alva Bradley, and the Van Sweringen brothers, who thought that the attraction of a stadium would benefit area commerce in general and their own commercial interests in downtown Cleveland in particular. However, some have incorrectly stated that it was built in a failed bid to attract the 1932 Summer Olympics, which had been awarded to Los Angeles in 1923, long before ground was broken on the stadium. Another common misconception is that Cleveland Stadium was a Works Progress Administration project; the WPA was not created until 1935, four years after the stadium was built.

In November 1928, Cleveland voters passed by 112,448 to 76,975, a 59% passage rate, with 55% needed to pass, "a US$2.5 million levy for a fireproof stadium on the Lakefront." Actual construction costs overran that amount by $500,000.

== Construction ==
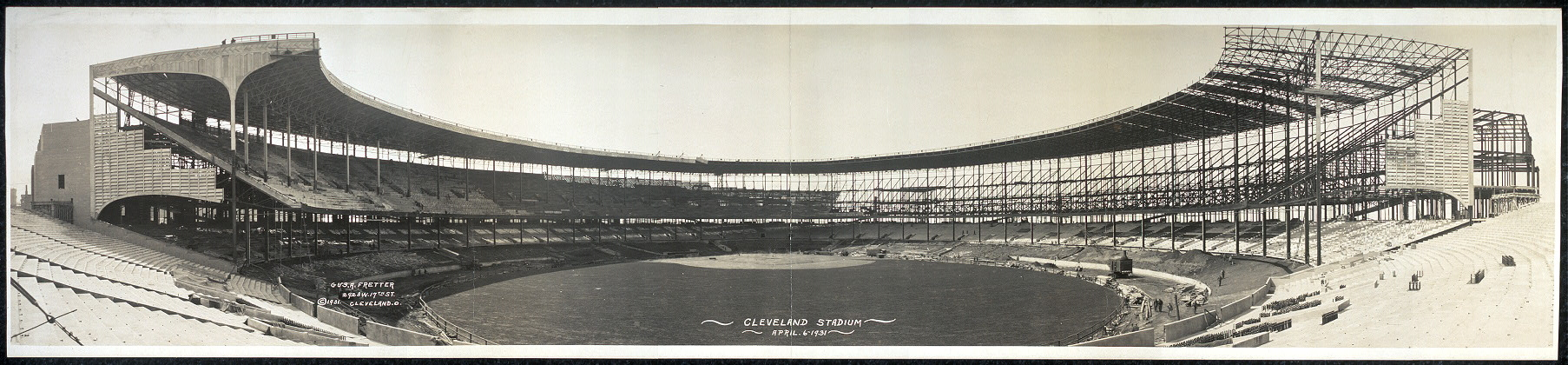
Cleveland Stadium under construction in 1931

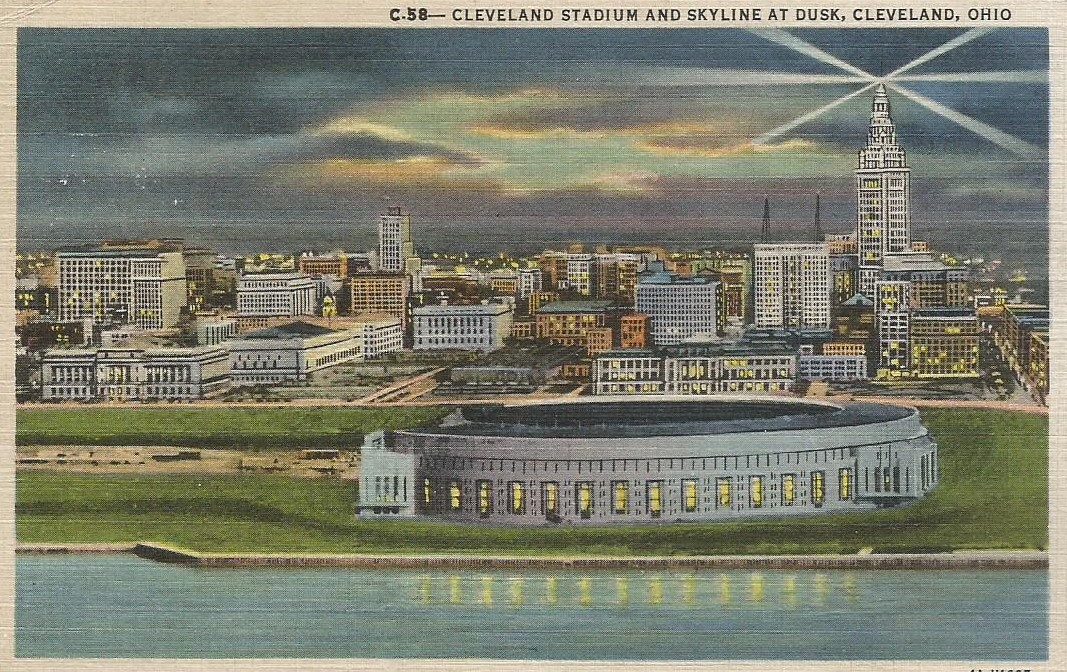
Cleveland Stadium and skyline, 1940s

Built during the administrations of city managers William R. Hopkins and Daniel E. Morgan, it was designed by the architectural firms of Walker and Weeks and by Osborn Engineering Company. It featured an early use of structural aluminum. The stadium was dedicated on July 1, 1931. On July 3, 1931, it hosted a boxing match for the National Boxing Association World Heavyweight Championship between Max Schmeling and Young Stribling, with 37,000 fans in attendance. Schmeling retained his title by a technical knockout victory in the 15th round.

The Donald Gray Gardens were installed on the stadium's north side in 1936 as part of the Great Lakes Exposition. They remained until construction started on Cleveland Browns Stadium in 1997.

== Tenants ==
=== Indians ===
The stadium was built for football as well as for the Cleveland Indians, who played their first game there on July 31, 1932, losing to the Philadelphia Athletics' great pitcher Lefty Grove 1–0 while attracting a then-major-league-record crowd of 80,184. The Indians played all of their games at the stadium from the middle of the 1932 season through 1933. However, the players and fans complained about the huge outfield, which reduced the number of home runs. Moreover, as the Great Depression worsened, attendance plummeted. The Indians returned to their smaller previous home, League Park, which was owned by the team, for all of the 1934 and 1935 seasons.

The Indians used the stadium to host the 1935 Major League Baseball All-Star Game and returned to the stadium in 1936 to host the New York Yankees on August 2 as part of the Great Lakes Exposition, drawing a crowd of 65,342. In 1937, the Indians began playing Sunday and holiday games at Cleveland Stadium during the summer, adding selected important games there in 1938. League Park lacked field lighting, so the emergence of night baseball in the 1930s led to the addition of night games to the schedule after lights were installed at the stadium in 1939. In 1940 and from 1942 on, the Indians played the majority of their home slate at the stadium, abandoning League Park entirely after the 1946 season. They remained at Cleveland Stadium until the end of the 1993 season, after which they moved to Jacobs Field.

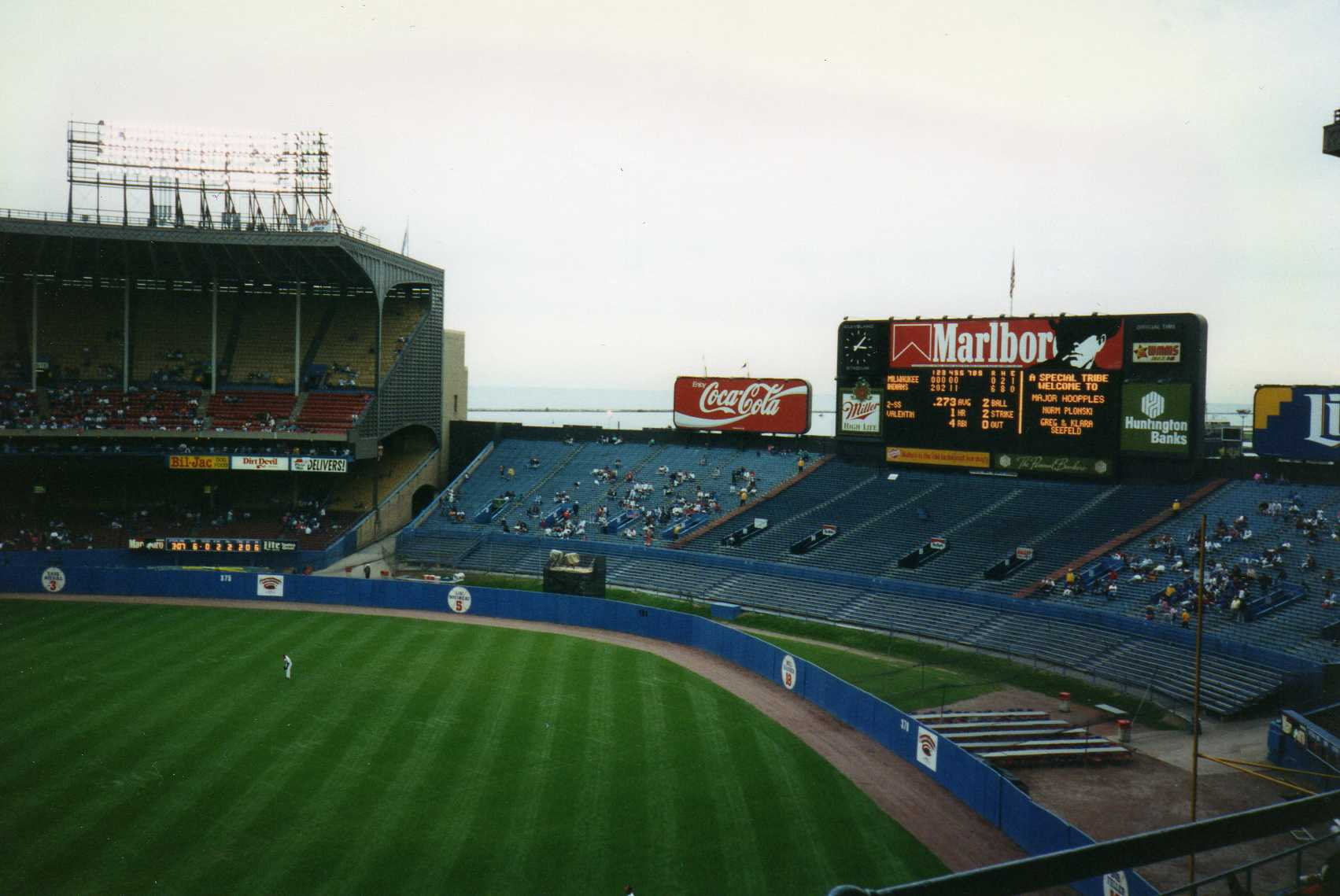
View of center field in 1993. Lake Erie is visible just outside the stadium. Visible beyond the outfield wall is a portion of the original (larger) outfield area.

The stadium foreshadowed problems that would emerge 40 years later when cookie-cutter stadiums were in vogue. Due to the fundamentally different sizes and shapes of baseball and football fields, the baseball sight lines generally left much to be desired. Many of the seats in the upper deck were too far from the field to be of any use during the regular season. The original baseball playing field was so large that an inner fence was constructed in 1947 to cut down the size of the spacious outfield. Even after the fence was installed, the distance markers on the bleacher walls remained visible for many years: 470 feet (140 m) from home plate to the bleachers in straightaway center field, 463 feet (141 m) to either corner of the bleachers, and 435 feet (133 m) to the far corners of the main stands in left-center and right-center. No player ever hit a home run into the center field bleachers. According to his autobiography, Veeck – As in Wreck, Indians owner Bill Veeck would move the fence in or out, varying by as much as 15 feet (4.6 m), depending on how it would favor the Indians, a practice that ended when the American League specifically legislated against moving fences during the course of a given season. But over the years, various ownerships tinkered with the position of the fence from time to time.

Like some other facilities built before warning tracks became standard, the stadium had an earthen berm in front of the center field wall. After the inner fence was installed, the berm was still visible during football season.

Jim Palmer was convinced that the pitcher's mound at the stadium was taller than most. "The mound was, despite whatever the rules claim, just a little lower than Mount Kilimanjaro."

The facility, located just south of Lake Erie, was known for the biting cold winds that would blow into the stadium in winter, as well as during much of the spring and fall. Because of its proximity to the lake during hot summer nights, its lights attracted swarms of midges and mayflies. Game 2 of the 2007 American League Division Series at Jacobs Field on October 5, 2007, brought back memories of the old stadium, when swarms of midges (misidentified by the television announcers as mayflies) infested the field, particularly the pitcher's mound.

The Indians set three Major League attendance records during the 1948 season, when they won the American League pennant and World Series behind pitcher Bob Feller and shortstop/player-manager Lou Boudreau. That season, Cleveland had the highest single season attendance, 2,620,627, which was not eclipsed until 1962 by the Los Angeles Dodgers, largest regular season night game attendance of 72,434 for the first major league start of Satchel Paige, and biggest World Series game attendance of 86,288 for game 5 on October 10, 1948. However, during the Indians' lean years from the 1960s through the 1990s, they rarely attracted more than 30,000 people, and even crowds of 40,000 looked sparse in the cavernous environment. After the Indians were eliminated from the pennant race in 1949, as a black humor-themed stunt they held a mock funeral procession on the field and buried their 1948 pennant behind the center field fence. Due to the large size of the facility, the Indians began using a bullpen car in 1950.

In addition to the 1935 MLB All-Star Game, Cleveland Stadium also hosted three additional all-star games: 1954, 1963, and 1981. Cleveland Stadium and Yankee Stadium are the only venues to host four MLB all-star games. On May 15, 1981, Len Barker threw a perfect game at the stadium, the second in franchise history and eighth in modern Major League history. The final Indians home game at Cleveland Stadium was held October 3, 1993, a 4–0 loss to the Chicago White Sox in front of 72,390 fans. During the game, fans, led by comedian Bob Hope, who grew up an Indians fan and was once a part-owner, sang a version of his signature song "Thanks for the Memory" with special lyrics for the occasion.

=== Browns ===
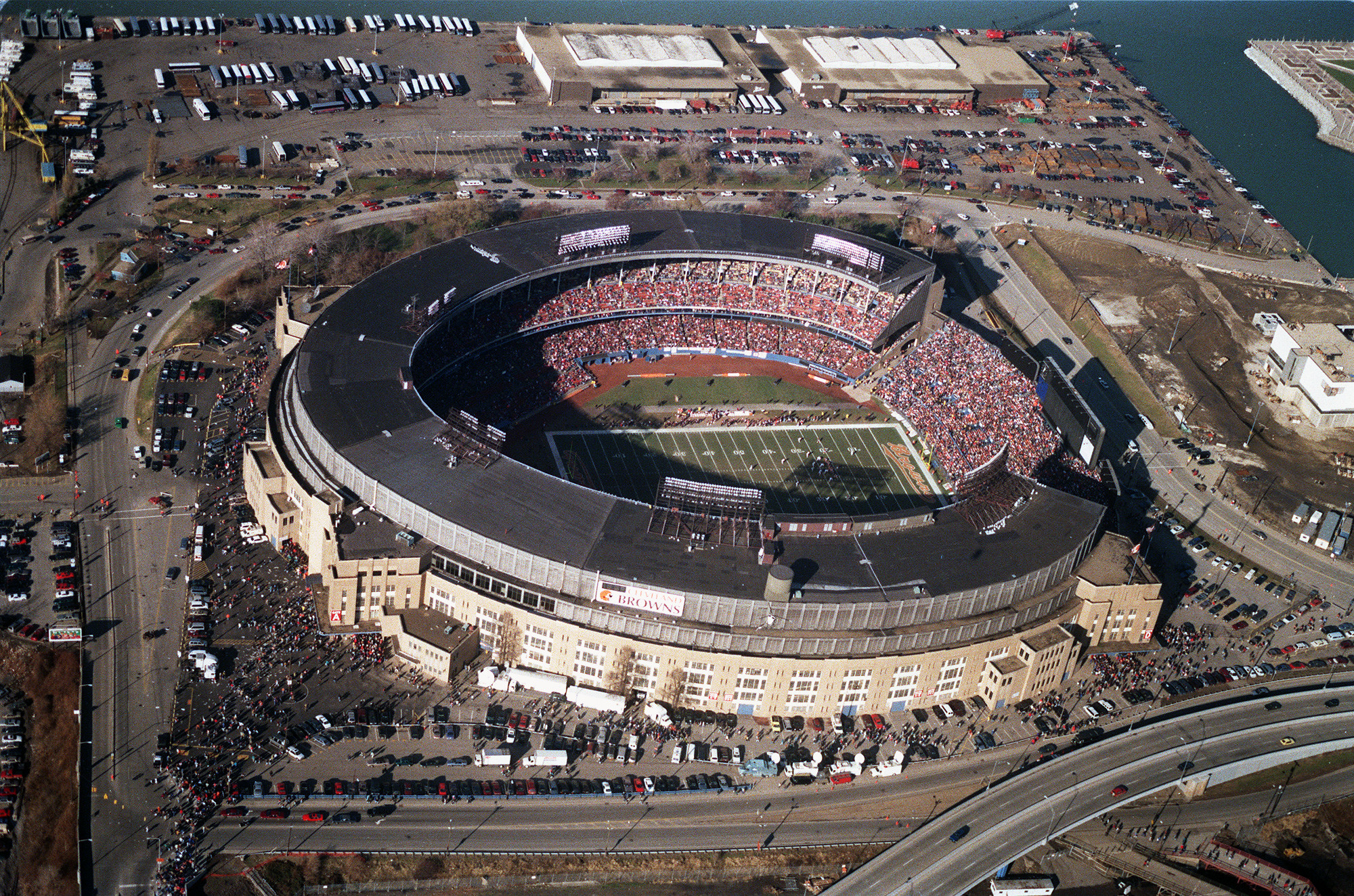
Aerial photo during the last Browns game played in the stadium, December 17, 1995, against the Cincinnati Bengals.

The Cleveland Browns, originally members of the All-America Football Conference (AAFC), began playing at the facility in 1946, and played there through 1995. The stadium was the site of the AAFC Championship game in 1946, 1948 and 1949, all Browns wins. The Browns joined the NFL in 1950 and hosted the NFL Championship Game in 1950, 1952, 1954, 1964, and 1968, winning titles in 1950, 1954, and 1964.

The first Browns game at the stadium was also the first AAFC game, when the Browns hosted the Miami Seahawks on September 6, 1946. The Browns won the game 44–0 and drew 60,135 fans, what was then a record for a professional football crowd. During the 1980s, the center field bleachers at the east end of the stadium were home to many of the club's most avid fans and became known as the Dawg Pound after the barks that fans made to disrupt opposing teams' offensive plays. The fans were copying Browns players Hanford Dixon and Frank Minnifield, who frequently appeared to bark to each other and to the opposition. Some of the fans even wore dog masks and threw dog biscuits at opposing players. The Dawg Pound was included in the design of Cleveland Browns Stadium (built on the same site as Cleveland Stadium), where the east end zone also has bleacher seating.

The stadium was also the site of two notable moments in Cleveland sports and Browns history. In a 1980 divisional playoff game on January 4, Browns quarterback Brian Sipe was intercepted in the end zone with less than a minute remaining in the game, resulting in a 14–12 loss to the Oakland Raiders. The game has since been referred to by the name of the pass play, Red Right 88. Six years later, during the 1986 AFC Championship game on January 11, John Elway led the Denver Broncos on what is referred to as The Drive, a 98-yard touchdown drive with 5:32 left that tied the game and sent it into overtime. The Broncos ultimately prevailed 23–20.

The final game in the stadium was held December 17, 1995, an emotional 26–10 win over the Cincinnati Bengals, the Browns' final game before the franchise was officially deactivated until 1999. At the end of that game, many fans cut and removed their seats.

=== Football Indians and Rams ===
Prior to the arrival of the Browns, the stadium was briefly the home field for two other NFL teams, the Cleveland Indians in 1931, and the Cleveland Rams from 1936 to 1937 and again from 1939 to 1941. The football Indians played two home games in their 1931 season, a 6–0 win over the Brooklyn Dodgers and a 14–0 loss to the Chicago Cardinals. The team drew a crowd of around only 2,000 spectators for the September 26th game against Brooklyn and 10,000 for the loss to the Cardinals on November 8.

The Rams were founded in 1936 as members of the second American Football League and joined the NFL in 1937. They played home games at the stadium their first two seasons, before moving to the smaller Shaw Stadium in 1938. The Rams returned to the stadium in 1939 and played home games there through the 1941 season before moving to League Park for the remainder of their time in Cleveland. The team returned to the stadium one last time to host the 1945 NFL Championship Game, a 15–14 win in what was the final Rams game in Cleveland before the team relocated to Los Angeles.

== Seating capacity ==
Baseball
Years	Capacity
1932–1949	78,811
1950–1966	73,811
1967–1968	74,056
1969–1975	76,966
1976–1980	76,713
1981	76,685
1982–1988	74,208
1989–1993	74,483

Football
Years	Capacity
1932–1946	83,000
1947	77,563
1948–1951	77,707
1952–1961	78,207
1962–1964	78,166
1965	77,096
1966	77,124
1967–1974	79,282
1975–1976	80,165
1977	80,233
1975–1980	80,385
1981–1982	80,322
1983–1991	80,098
1992–1995	78,512

== Records and milestones ==
- July 1, 1931 – Dedication
- July 3, 1931 – Opening event: World Heavyweight Championship boxing match between Max Schmeling and Young Stribling, with 37,000 fans in attendance.
- July 31, 1932 – First Cleveland Indians game, vs. Philadelphia Athletics (loss, 1–0); pitched by Mel Harder
- December 16, 1945 – The Cleveland Rams defeated the Washington Redskins 15–14, to win the NFL championship. Twenty-seven days later the Rams moved to Los Angeles.
- December 24, 1950 – The Browns defeated the Los Angeles Rams 30–28 in the 1950 NFL Championship Game.
- December 28, 1952 – The Detroit Lions defeated the Browns 17–7 in the 1952 NFL Championship Game.
- September 12, 1954 – A league record 84,587 people attended a Yankees-Indians game.
- December 26, 1954 – The Browns defeated the Lions 56–10 in the 1954 NFL Championship Game.
- April 19, 1960 – The Detroit Tigers and Cleveland Indians played 15 innings on Opening Day, tying the record for the longest Opening-Day game.
- June 17, 1960 – Ted Williams hits his 500th career home run.
- December 27, 1964 – The Browns defeated the Baltimore Colts 27–0 in the 1964 NFL Championship Game.
- August 14, 1966 – The Beatles performed at the stadium.
- June 21, 1970 – Detroit's César Gutiérrez got seven hits in seven at bats in 12 innings.
- September 21, 1970 – The first ever Monday Night Football game was played, with the Browns defeating the New York Jets.
- June 4, 1974 – Ten Cent Beer Night: The Indians hosted the Texas Rangers while promoting unlimited beer for $.10/cup for the fans in order to attract fans to the stadium. Due to the rowdiness of the intoxicated fans, the Indians were forced to forfeit the game.
- April 8, 1975 – MLB first black manager: Hall-of-Famer Frank Robinson made his debut as the first black manager in the history of Major League Baseball. Robinson, in the latter stages of his career, had been acquired as a player in the last month of the previous season. He served that Opening Day as a player-manager, hitting a home run to add to the historic day, helping lead the Indians to a 5–3 win over the Yankees before over 56,000 fans.
- June 25, 1977 – 83,199 people attended a concert by the British rock group Pink Floyd.
- January 4, 1981 – The Browns lost their divisional playoff game against the Oakland Raiders when an interception occurred during a play called Red Right 88. The Browns only needed a field goal to take the lead but had an ailing kicker.
- May 15, 1981 – Len Barker's perfect game: Len Barker pitched the tenth perfect game in baseball history
- August 21, 1986 – Boston's Spike Owen tied a Major League record by scoring six runs
- January 11, 1987 – The Drive: In one of Cleveland's sports disappointments, John Elway led the Denver Broncos 98 yards down the field for the tying score late in the AFC Championship Game. Denver won in overtime, 23–20, earning the right to play in Super Bowl XXI
- September 2, 1990 – Toronto's Dave Stieb pitched the first no-hitter in franchise history
- October 3, 1993 – Last Cleveland Indians game, vs. Chicago White Sox (loss, 4–0)
- December 17, 1995 – Last Cleveland Browns game, vs. Cincinnati Bengals (win, 26–10)
- December 3, 1996 – Stadium catches fire during demolition
- March 1, 1997 – Demolition completed

== Other events ==
=== College football ===
The only Great Lakes Bowl was held there in 1947.

The stadium hosted the annual college football game between Notre Dame and Navy 11 times: in 1932, 1934, 1939, 1942, 1943, 1945, 1947, 1950, 1952, 1976 and 1978. The games were well attended, with an average attendance of 69,730 and a high of 84,090 fans for the 1947 game, which was won by Notre Dame 27–0.

Local college teams, including Western Reserve Red Cats, Case Tech Rough Riders, John Carroll Blue Streaks, and Baldwin Wallace Yellow Jackets often used the stadium for home games and local matchups, especially during the 1930s and 1940s when the city Big Four Conference was strong. Of the 60 all-time Big Four matchups, 22 were played at Cleveland Stadium, the most of any venue.

The Illinois Fighting Illini played the Penn State Nittany Lions there in 1959. The Ohio State Buckeyes played in the stadium four times, the first three as the home team during World War II. The first was in a 1942 win over Illinois before 68,656, the second a 1943 loss to Purdue, and the third a 1944 victory over Illinois. The final college football contest played there was on October 19, 1991, when the Northwestern Wildcats played a neutral site "home" game against the Buckeyes. While Northwestern received the home team's share of the gate receipts, Buckeye fans made up the vast majority of the crowd.

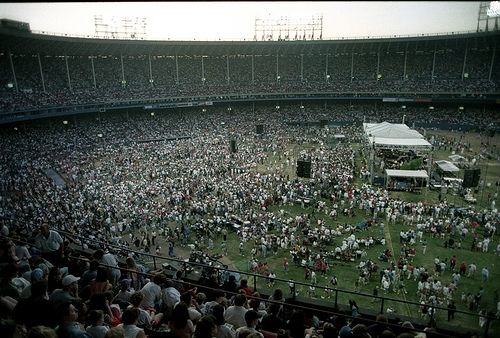
The stadium hosts a 1994 Billy Graham crusade

=== Concerts ===
In addition to sporting events, the stadium hosted a number of other events including concerts. The first concert held at the stadium, featuring the Beatles, took place on August 14,1966. From 1974 to 1980, the World Series of Rock concerts were held each summer featuring acts such as the Rolling Stones, Pink Floyd, the Beach Boys, AC/DC and Aerosmith. The Rolling Stones' July 1, 1978 concert of 82,238 attendees was reportedly the first concert to gross over $1 million.

In the 1980s and 1990s, the stadium hosted concerts by the Jacksons, Bruce Springsteen, U2, Genesis, the Who and Paul McCartney, plus more concerts by Pink Floyd and the Rolling Stones.

On September 2, 1995, the opening of the Rock and Roll Hall of Fame was celebrated with an all-star concert which featured Chuck Berry, Bob Dylan, Aretha Franklin, Jerry Lee Lewis and others.

=== Religious events ===
The stadium also hosted numerous religious services. Its most heavily attended event was the Roman Catholic Church's Seventh Eucharistic Congress, hosted by the Diocese of Cleveland in 1935, which attracted 75,000 to a midnight mass on September 24, 1935, and an estimated 125,000 to Eucharistic service the following day. One of the stadium's last events was a Billy Graham crusade, held in 1994.

== Demise ==
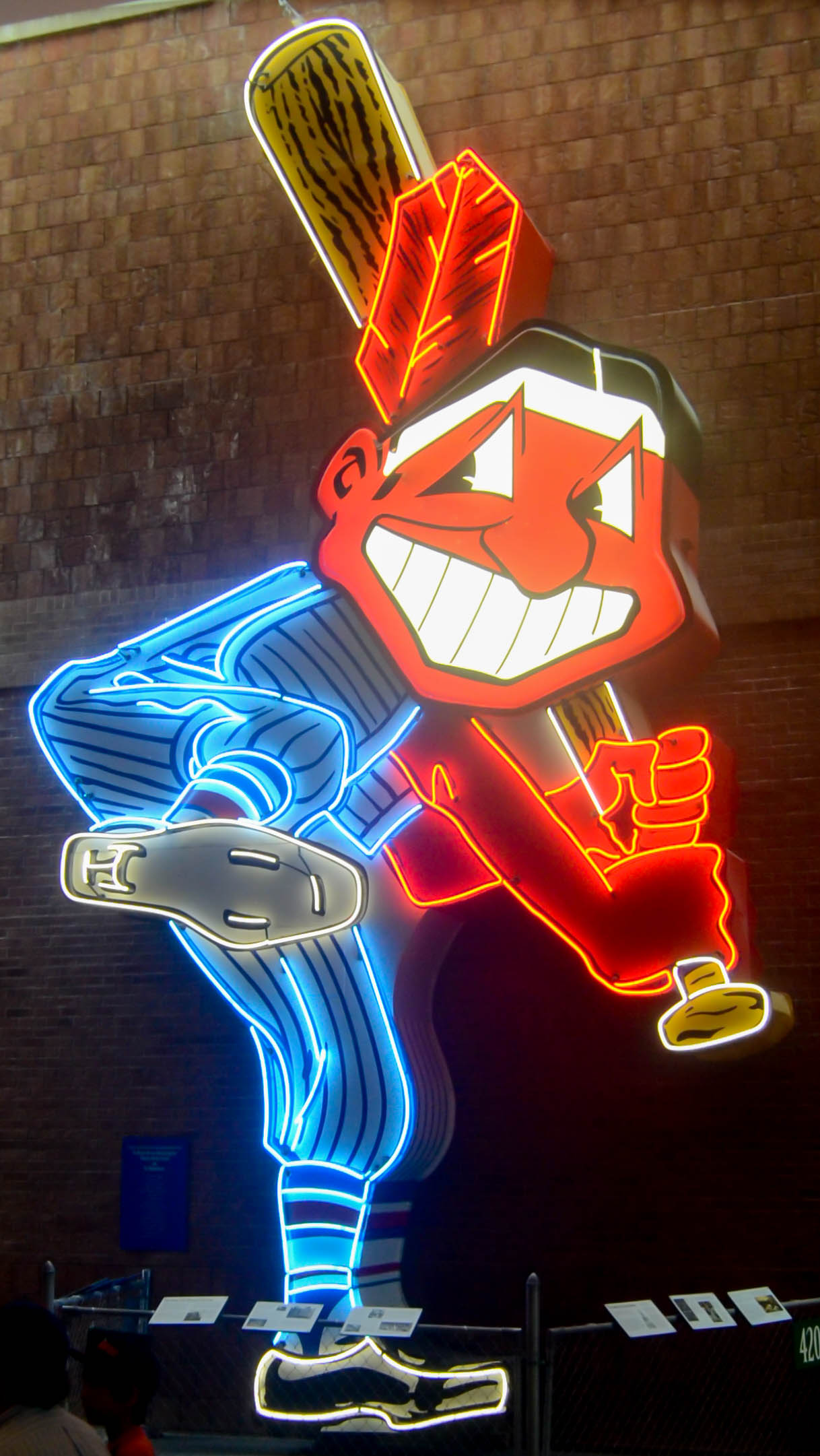
A 28-foot Chief Wahoo sign that stood atop one of the entrances to Cleveland Municipal Stadium until the Indians baseball team moved to a Jacobs Field in 1994, the sign was restored and installed in the Western Reserve Historical Society’s lobby in February, 1995.

As the stadium aged and maintenance costs increased, the facility became an economic drain on the City of Cleveland, which owned and originally operated it. In 1973, then-Browns owner Art Modell signed a 25-year lease to operate Cleveland Municipal Stadium. Modell's newly formed company, Stadium Corporation, assumed the expenses of operations from the city, freeing up tax revenue for other purposes. Also, Modell would pay an annual rent of $150,000 for the first five years and $200,000 afterward to the city. In exchange, Modell would receive all revenue generated by the stadium. Stadium Corp invested in improvements, including new electronic scoreboards and luxury suites. However, the stadium's inadequacy was becoming apparent in any event; chunks of concrete were falling off and the pilings were starting to petrify.

Modell, mistakenly believing that his revenues were not endangered, refused to participate in the Gateway Project that built a new ballpark for the Indians and a new arena for the Cavaliers. Modell's assumptions proved incorrect, and Stadium Corp.'s suite revenues declined sharply in the 1994 season without the approximately 81 games the Indians played in the facility each season. The following year, Modell announced plans to move the Browns to Baltimore after the 1995 season.

Modell's move of the Browns breached the team's lease, and the City of Cleveland sued. As part of the settlement, the city agreed to demolish Cleveland Stadium and build a new stadium on the same site. Modell agreed to leave the Browns' name, colors, and history in Cleveland, and the NFL agreed to have a resurrected Browns team by 1999, either by relocation or expansion. Demolition on Cleveland Stadium began in November 1996 and was completed in early 1997. 15,000 short tons (14,000 t) of demolition debris was dumped into Lake Erie to create three artificial reefs for fishermen and divers, offshore of Cleveland and neighboring Lakewood. Construction on the new stadium began later in 1997 and it opened in August 1999 as Cleveland Browns Stadium.

== Popular culture ==
Several scenes for the motion picture, The Fortune Cookie, were filmed during the game between the Browns and the visiting Minnesota Vikings on October 31, 1965. Much of the 1949 movie The Kid from Cleveland, in which Bob Feller, Lou Boudreau, Bill Veeck and Satchel Paige played themselves, was filmed there. Despite being set in the stadium, the 1989 motion picture Major League was not filmed in the stadium. While aerial distance shots of the stadium were used, Milwaukee County Stadium, whose grandstand interior looked similar to that of Municipal Stadium, was used for filming. Some scenes in the 1991 made-for-TV biopic Babe Ruth, starring Stephen Lang as Ruth and with a cameo by Pete Rose as Ty Cobb, were filmed there.

Preceded by League Park	Home of the Cleveland Indians; 1932–1993 (shared with League Park from 1932–1933 and 1936–1946)	Succeeded by League Park; Jacobs Field
Preceded by first stadium	Home of the Cleveland Browns; 1946–1995	Succeeded by Cleveland Browns Stadium
Preceded by first stadium Shaw Stadium	Home of the Cleveland Rams; 1936; 1939–1941	Succeeded by League Park; League Park
Preceded by Polo Grounds; Crosley Field; Wrigley Field; Dodger Stadium	Host of the All-Star Game; 1935; 1954; 1963; 1981	Succeeded by Braves Field; County Stadium; Shea Stadium; Olympic Stadium
Preceded by Miami Orange Bowl	Host of AFC Championship Game; 1987	Succeeded by Mile High Stadium
