= William R. Hopkins =

American politician

41st Mayor of Cleveland (officially City Manager)
- In office 1924–1929
- Preceded by: Fred Kohler
- Succeeded by: Daniel E. Morgan

Personal details
- Born: William Rowland Hopkins; July 26, 1869 Johnstown, Pennsylvania, U.S.
- Died: February 9, 1961 (aged 91) Cleveland, Ohio, U.S.
- Party: Republican
- Spouse: Ellen Louise Cozad (m. 1903; div. 1923)
- Education: Western Reserve University

William Rowland Hopkins (July 26, 1869 – February 9, 1961) was an American politician of the Republican Party who served as the first city manager of Cleveland, Ohio from 1924 to 1929, during the brief period that Cleveland had a council-manager government instead of a mayor-council government (he has been since credited by the city as being its 41st mayor).

Hopkins was born in Johnstown, Pennsylvania, the son of David J. and Mary Jeffreys Hopkins. In 1874, the family moved to Cleveland. Hopkins attended Western Reserve Academy by working in the Cleveland Rolling Mills to pay his way through and graduated in 1892. At Western Reserve University, he earned a Bachelor of Arts in 1896, where he also managed the undefeated 1894 Western Reserve football team. In 1897, he began studying law at Case, while simultaneously serving in Cleveland City Council as a Republican. In 1899, he earned his Bachelor of Laws and left city council. Hopkins laid out new industrial plant developments and promoted construction of the Cleveland Short Line Railroad in 1905. The following year, he gave up his law practice and went into business. Hopkins then entered local politics by becoming chairman of the Republican county committee and a member of the election board.

By 1924, Cleveland had seen several controversial political figures in office such as Fred Kohler and Harry L. Davis. Voters decided to try to extricate municipal government from partisan politics by adopting the city manager plan. Hopkins was selected by local Republican boss Maurice Maschke, former postmaster William J. Murphy, and business manager of the news George Moran as the man who could hold the job as the city's manager. He was elected to the position by a coalition.

As city manager, Hopkins brought new development to Cleveland. He pushed for the development of parks, improved welfare institutions, wider boulevards, more playgrounds, air pollution control, and the construction of both the Van Sweringen brothers' Terminal Tower and Cleveland Stadium. However, because the balance between city council and the city's central government was outweighed due to Hopkins' efficiency, council was always at war with the city manager, especially the newly elected Peter Witt. Now with the city manager plan, council's role was diminished to such an extent and it almost became irrelevant. This, however, did not stop Hopkins' ambition for development.

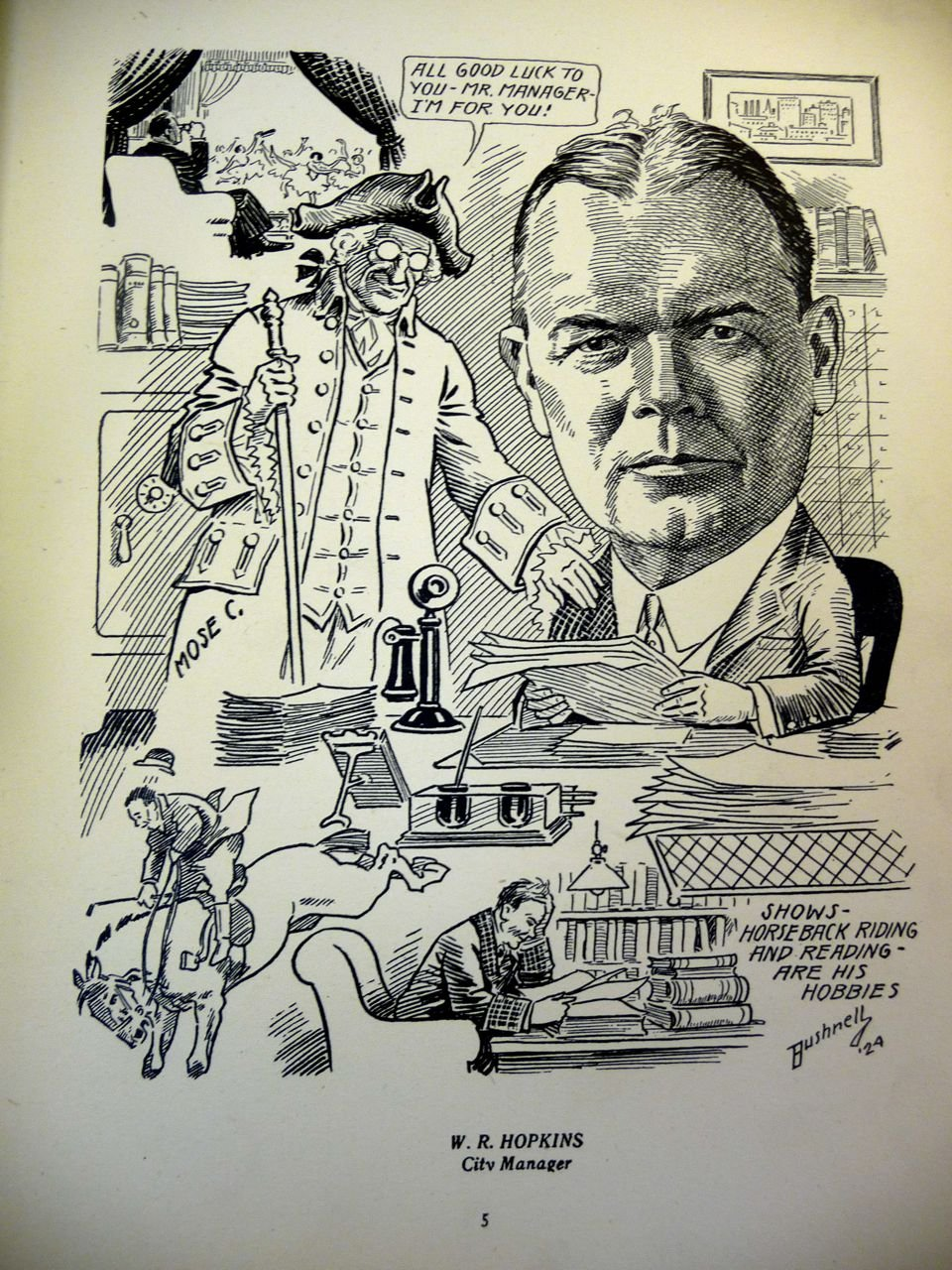
1924 caricature of Hopkins, by E. A. Bushnell

His first plan was to fill in the lakefront, behind jetties. When first announced, the idea seemed almost incomprehensible. By the time he left office, however, the land saw development and today the landfill is occupied by Cleveland Browns Stadium, its predecessor Cleveland Stadium, much of the eastern portion of Cleveland Memorial Shoreway and the Cleveland Burke Lakefront Airport.

Hopkins was recognized as being very charismatic. An excellent speaker, he was nicknamed by Witt as "Chautauqua Bill." He won support of Cleveland's large ethnic population, receiving praise in Yiddish, German, Hungarian, Czech, Polish and other foreign-language papers (there were roughly a half-dozen in big circulation at the time).

In 1925, Hopkins proposed a bold new initiative; the construction of a large airport, ten miles southwest of downtown. At the time, the idea seemed like a pipe dream with the introduction of the airplane being relatively new. Still, Hopkins was fascinated by aviation and felt that if Cleveland were to ever modernize itself, an airport would be a solid starting point. When Hopkins urged the purchase of piece of land from Brook Park, sounding off ideas of planes flying from Cleveland to Paris and London with thousands of people on board (later a reality with Cleveland-London flight service being introduced in 1999 and Cleveland to Paris in 2008), Witt ridiculed the idea. The rest of council, however, avoided opposing it openly, so the land was purchased.

However, council still felt that Hopkins had acquired too much control and removed him from office in January 1930. His replacement was Daniel E. Morgan, the second and final city manager of Cleveland. In 1931, Hopkins became a member of council again and fought unsuccessfully to keep the city manager system. However, it was soon overturned and the city returned to a mayor-council government. In 1933, Hopkins retired from politics. In his honor, the Cleveland Municipal Airport was renamed Cleveland Hopkins International Airport in 1951.

== Death ==
Hopkins suffered from declining health in his last years. He died at the Wade Park Manor apartments in Cleveland on February 9, 1961. He was buried at Lake View Cemetery in Cleveland.

Political offices
Preceded by Fred Kohler	Mayor/City Manager of Cleveland; 1924–1929	Succeeded by Daniel E. Morgan
