= Ray T. Miller =

American politician

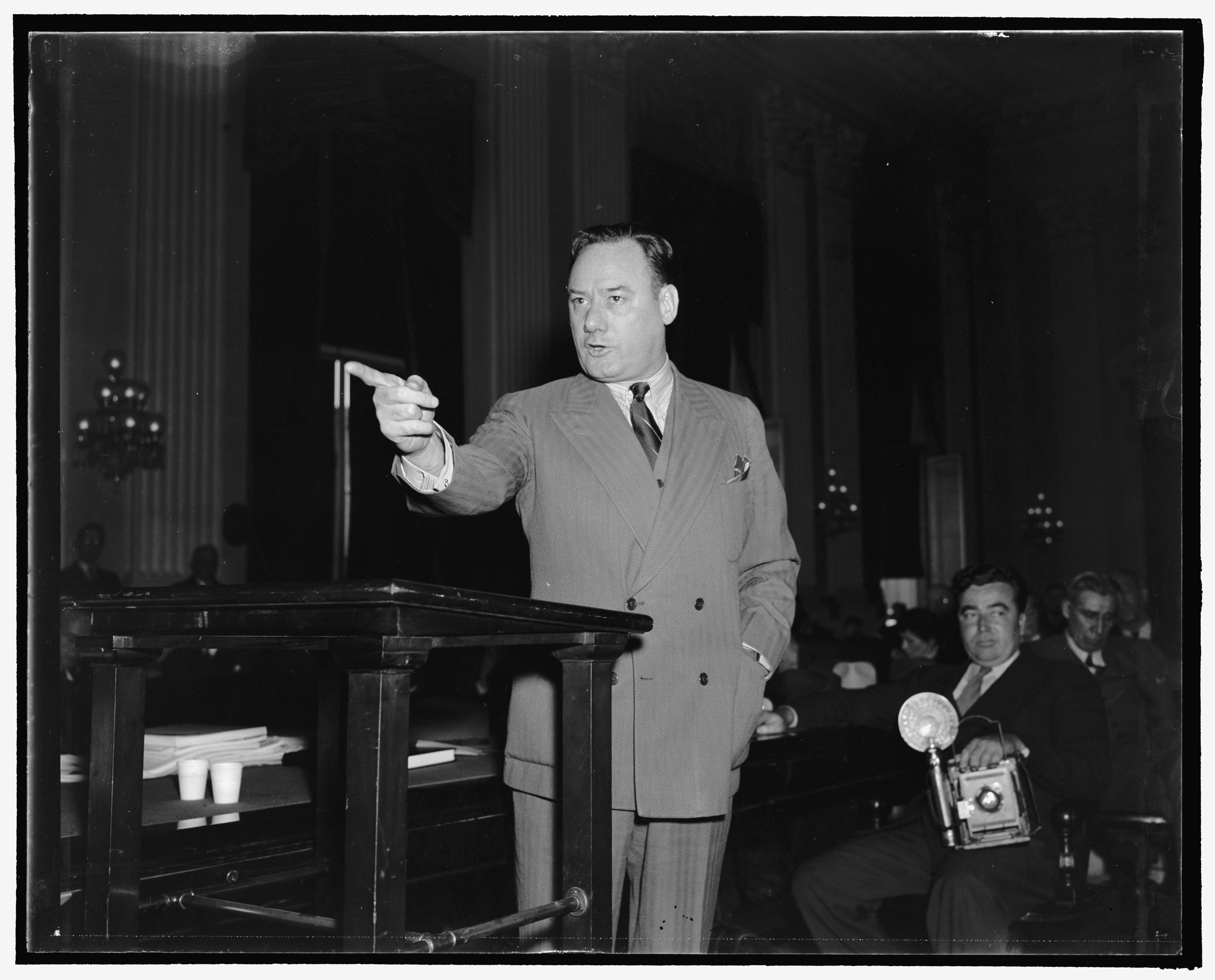
- Miller in 1938

43rd Mayor of Cleveland
- In office 1932–1933
- Preceded by: Daniel E. Morgan
- Succeeded by: Harry L. Davis

Personal details
- Born: Raymond Thomas Miller; January 10, 1893 Defiance, Ohio, U.S.
- Died: July 13, 1966 (aged 73) Shaker Heights, Ohio, U.S.
- Party: Democratic
- Spouse: Ruth Hamilton (m. 1926)
- Children: Roseanne, Ray, Ruth, Richard, Robert, Riley
- Relatives: Harry Miller (brother); Don Miller (brother); Creighton Miller (nephew)
- Education: Notre Dame University (LLB)

Raymond Thomas Miller Sr. (January 10, 1893 – July 13, 1966) was an American politician who served as the 43rd mayor of Cleveland, and the chairman of the Cuyahoga County Democratic Party for over twenty years.

== Life and career ==
Miller was born in Defiance, Ohio. He attended University of Notre Dame and was a member of the Notre Dame Fighting Irish football in 1911 and 1912. Four of his brothers, Harry, Don, Gerry, and Walter, and two nephews, Tom and Creighton, also played football for the Irish. He received his Bachelor of Laws degree in 1914. He joined the Ohio National Guard and served in France during World War I. After the war, Miller began practicing law in Cleveland. In 1928, he was elected county prosecutor and had a hand in defeating the city manager plan. He defeated Daniel E. Morgan for mayor in a special election in February 1932, becoming the first Democrat to serve as the city's mayor since Newton D. Baker. In his tenure, Miller reduced expenditures to cope with the misery brought by the Great Depression. He was defeated by returning Cleveland politician and former mayor, Harry L. Davis, when he ran for reelection in 1933.

In 1938, Miller became chairman of the Cuyahoga County Democratic Party. As chairman, he succeeded in attracting ethnic European and African American voters to the party, which allowed the Democrats to "elect mayors for 30 years" and secure a Democratic majority in Cleveland City Council. Miller resigned as chairman in 1964.

Miller founded and owned radio stations WERE (1300 AM) and WERE-FM (98.5) in Cleveland; through his Cleveland Broadcasting Incorporated name, Miller later purchased WLEC and WLEC-FM in Sandusky, Ohio; and KFAC (1330 AM) and KFAC (92.3 FM) in Los Angeles, California.

== Death ==
Miller died suddenly of a heart attack at his home in Shaker Heights, Ohio, on May 21, 1966. He was buried at Calvary Cemetery in Cleveland.

Political offices
Preceded by Daniel E. Morgan	Mayor of Cleveland; 1932–1933	Succeeded by Harry L. Davis
