= 1933 Cleveland mayoral election =

Cleveland mayoral election, 1933
- November 7, 1933
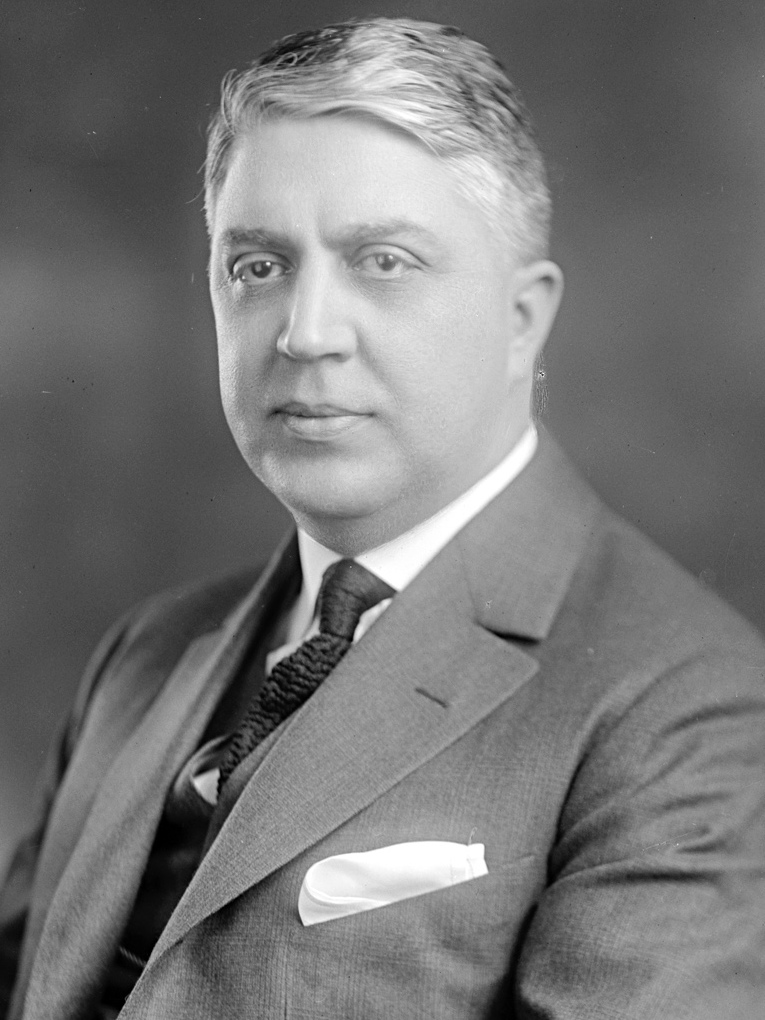

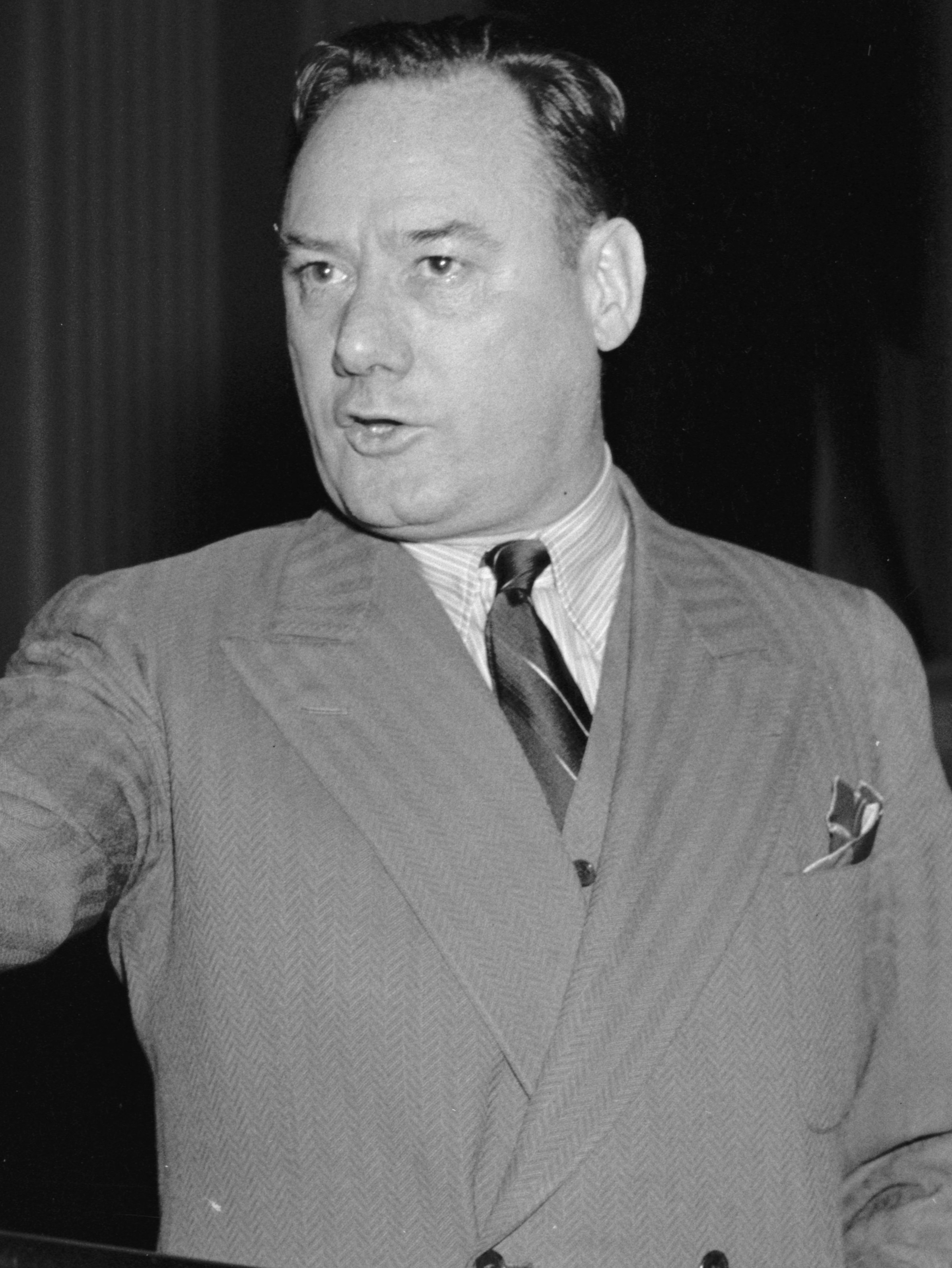
Nominee	Harry L. Davis	Ray T. Miller
Party	Republican	Democratic
Popular vote	147,673	133,227
Percentage	52.57%	47.43%
Mayor before election
Ray T. Miller
Democratic
Elected mayor
Harry L. Davis
Republican

The Cleveland mayoral election of 1933 saw former Governor Harry L. Davis unseat incumbent mayor Ray T. Miller.

== General election ==
1933 Cleveland mayoral election (general election)
Party	Candidate	Votes	%
Republican	Harry L. Davis	147,673	52.57%
Democratic	Ray T. Miller (incumbent)	133,227	47.43%
