= William S. Fitzgerald =

American politician

William S. FitzGerald, Sr.
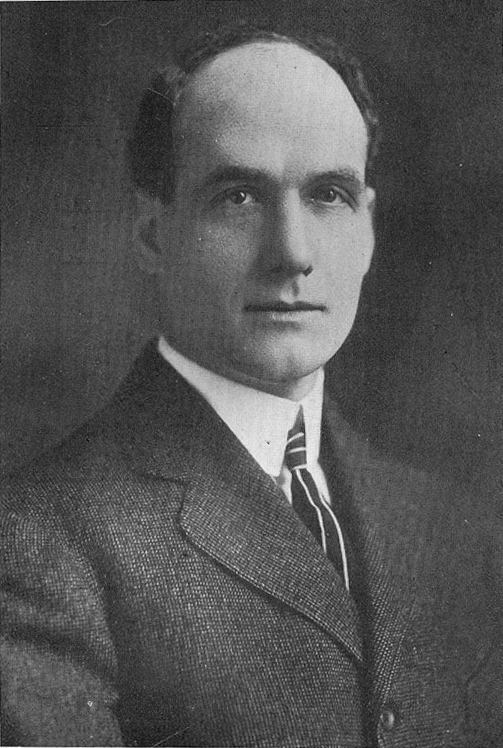

39th Mayor of Cleveland
- In office 1920–1921
- Preceded by: Harry L. Davis
- Succeeded by: Fred Kohler

Personal details
- Born: William Sinton FitzGerald; October 6, 1880 Washington, D.C., U.S.
- Died: October 3, 1937 (aged 56) North Royalton, Ohio, U.S.
- Party: Republican
- Spouse(s): Margaret Chilton Tucker (m. 1920; div. 1922); Carolina Granger (m. 1933)
- Children: William S. Fitzgerald, Jr.
- Education: The George Washington University

William Sinton FitzGerald, Sr. (October 6, 1880 – October 3, 1937) was an American politician of the Republican Party who served as the 39th mayor of Cleveland, Ohio.

== Life and career ==
FitzGerald was born in Washington, D.C. to an Irish family. He received public education and attended George Washington University, graduating with a Master of Laws degree in 1903. The following year, he moved to Cleveland, was admitted to the Ohio State Bar Association, and began practicing law. In 1911, he entered politics and was elected as a Republican city councilman for Ward 11, serving two terms. Under Mayor Harry L. Davis, FitzGerald was appointed law director.

When Davis resigned in 1920 to campaign for the Ohio governorship, FitzGerald became mayor for a brief period in 1920-21. His most notable achievement as mayor was his successful fight, in cooperation with Cleveland City Council and Councilman Jacob Stacel, to prevent the Ku Klux Klan from establishing a presence in the city.

In the 1921 mayoral election, FitzGerald was defeated by former Cleveland Police chief Fred Kohler. He subsequently returned to private practice.

== Personal life ==
FitzGerald was a bachelor when he became mayor. He married Margaret Chilton Tucker of Chicago, Illinois, on January 14, 1920. He had met her while on a business trip to Washington, D.C., and courted her whenever he visited the city. Fitzgerald kept his marriage a secret from the public until August 27, 1921. The couple had a son, William Sinton FitzGerald, Jr. The FitzGeralds divorced in 1922. The birth of their son was kept secret from the public until his existence was revealed in the divorce proceedings.

FitzGerald then married Carolina Granger of Cleveland on March 23, 1933.

== Death ==
FitzGerald died unexpectedly of a heart attack at his home in the Cleveland suburb of North Royalton, at 5:25 AM on October 3, 1937. His place of burial may not be known.

Political offices
Preceded by Harry L. Davis	Mayor of Cleveland; 1920–1921	Succeeded by Fred Kohler
