= Creighton Miller =

American football player and attorney (1922–2002)

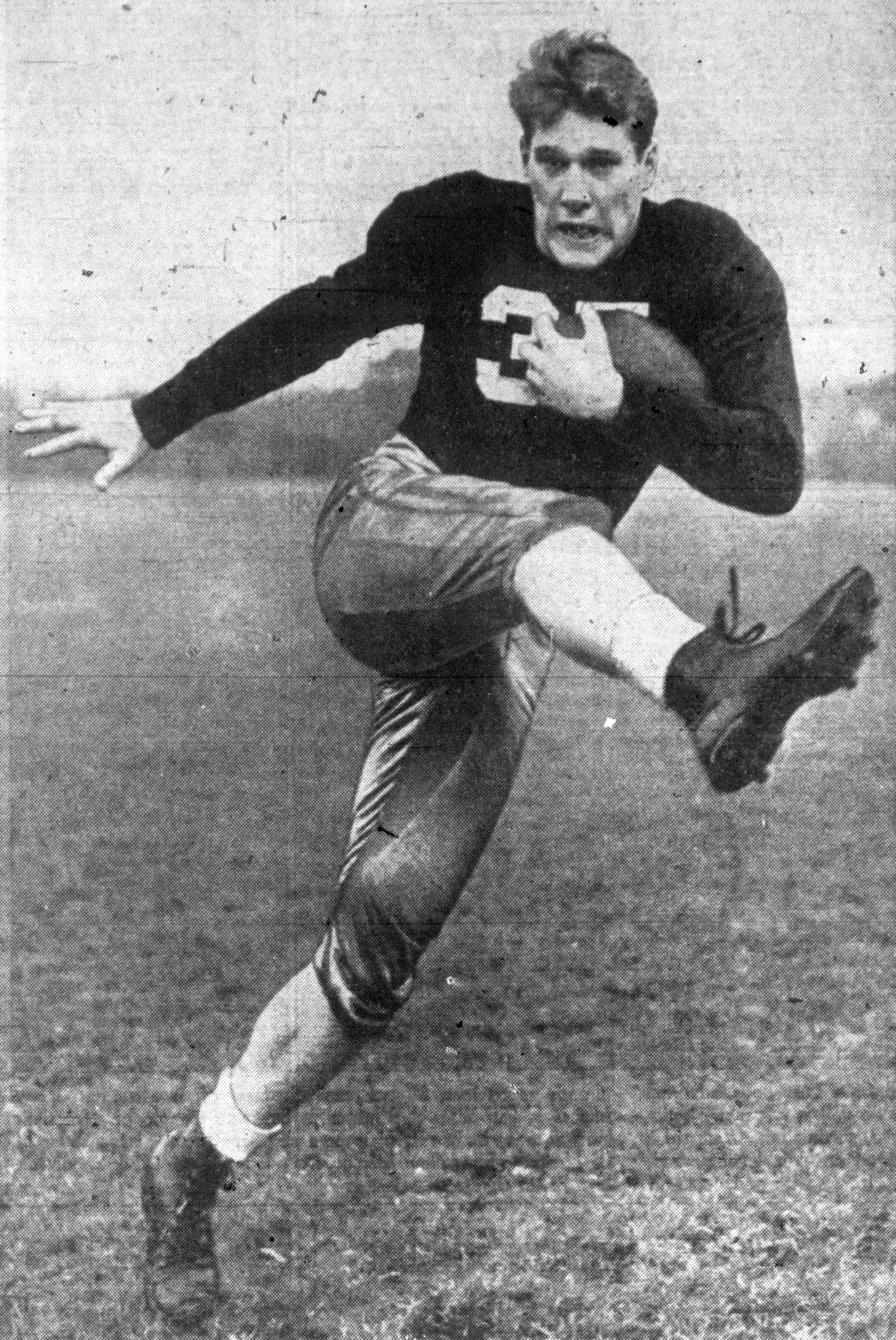
- Miller, circa 1942

No. 37
- Position: Halfback

Personal information
- Born: September 26, 1922; Cleveland, Ohio, U.S.
- Died: May 25, 2002 (aged 79); Shaker Heights, Ohio, U.S.
- Listed height: 6 ft 0 in (1.83 m)
- Listed weight: 190 lb (86 kg)

Career information
- College: Notre Dame
- NFL draft: 1944: 1st round, 3rd overall pick

Career history
- 1941–1943: Notre Dame Fighting Irish

Awards and highlights
- National champion (1943); 2× Consensus All-American (1943, 1944); NCAA rushing leader (1943); Delaware Sports HOF (1976)
- College Football Hall of Fame

Creighton Miller (September 26, 1922 – May 22, 2002) was an American football player and attorney. As an attorney, he played a role in organizing the National Football League Players Association (NFLPA), the union that represents players in the National Football League (NFL). He was elected to the College Football Hall of Fame and the Delaware Sports Museum and Hall of Fame in 1976.

Miller was born in Cleveland, Ohio and was the seventh member of his family to play football at the University of Notre Dame in South Bend, Indiana. He was a star halfback for a Notre Dame Fighting Irish football team that won the national championship in 1943. Miller was named an All-American that year, finished fourth in Heisman Trophy voting and led the nation in rushing yards, with 911.

Miller was drafted by the Brooklyn Tigers of the NFL but did not play professionally because of high blood pressure. He coached briefly at Notre Dame and as an assistant in 1946 for the Cleveland Browns in the All-America Football Conference (AAFC) before becoming a lawyer practicing in Cleveland. Working with Browns players including Dante Lavelli and Abe Gibron, he helped found the NFLPA in 1956 and served as its first legal counsel. He stayed in the position until 1968, the same year the union was recognized by the NFL. Miller continued to practice law in Cleveland, specializing in maritime and asbestos litigation, until his death in 2002.

== Early life and college career ==
Miller was born in Cleveland, Ohio, into a well storied family of athletes. He attended DuPont High School outside Wilmington, Delaware, and was the seventh member of his family to play football at the University of Notre Dame in South Bend, Indiana. Harry Miller, his father, was an All-American halfback at the school and the captain of the Fighting Irish football team in 1908. One of his uncles, Don Miller, was part of the dominant 1924 Notre Dame backfield nicknamed the Four Horsemen. His brother Tom played with him at the school in 1941 and 1942. Miller was named after Creighton University, where his father was head football coach.

Miller was a standout halfback at Notre Dame under head coach Frank Leahy starting in 1941. He rushed for 151 yards in a 1942 game against Northwestern University, a single-game school record that stood until 1974. In 1943, he led the nation in rushing with 911 yards. He scored 13 touchdowns and came in fourth in Heisman Trophy voting as Notre Dame finished with a 9–1 win–loss record and won the national championship. He was named a consensus All-American and was chosen to play in the College All-Star Game, a now-defunct annual matchup between the champions of the National Football League (NFL) and a squad of the best college players from around the country. As he succeeded on the field, Miller's independent streak became increasingly apparent. To Leahy's frustration, he skipped spring practices every year of his Notre Dame career to play golf, but the coach did not discipline Miller because he was the team's best halfback.

== Coaching and legal career ==
Miller was selected by the NFL's Brooklyn Tigers in the first round with the third overall pick in the 1944 NFL draft. High blood pressure, however, forced him to discontinue athletic activities. He stayed at Notre Dame in 1944 to coach and study law. The following year, Miller took a job as an assistant coach for the Cleveland Browns, a team in the new All-America Football Conference coached by Paul Brown. By the time he was hired by Browns owner Arthur B. McBride, whose son attended Notre Dame, he was studying law at Yale University and was a backfield coach for the school's football team. Miller was the team's first hire, and joined the Browns on August 1, 1946. He returned to Yale Law School at the end of the year, after the Browns won the AAFC championship.

Miller coached with the Browns for one year, drawing a $5,200 salary ($85,853 in 2025 dollars) that helped pay for law school. After graduating, he became an attorney practicing in Cleveland and was the Browns' legal counsel until McBride sold the team in 1953. In 1954, Browns end Dante Lavelli and guard Abe Gibron approached Miller about forming a union to represent players in the NFL, to which the Browns had moved in 1950. NFL salaries had gone up in the late 1950s compared to the decade before, but owners' profits were rising at an even more rapid rate as the sport gained in popularity. Players complained about not receiving salaries for exhibition games or pre-season training camps to which more than 60 men often participated but only 36 came away with roster spots. Major League Baseball players already had a players' union, and Lavelli and Gibron thought the NFL should have a similar organization advocating for their interests.

Lavelli, Gibron, Miller and Browns quarterback George Ratterman met in Lavelli's basement in Rocky River, Ohio, on Wednesday nights to discuss the union idea. The men also met at Miller's office in downtown Cleveland. After two years of discussions and recruitment, they found 370 NFL players willing to support a union; the only holdouts were members of the Chicago Bears who were loyal to owner George Halas. In November 1956, Miller, along with Los Angeles Rams quarterback Norm Van Brocklin and New York Giants end Kyle Rote announced the formation of the National Football League Players Association (NFLPA).

The NFLPA demanded that players receive a $5,000 minimum annual salary and be paid during training camp and while unable to play due to football injury. The owners made some concessions, but refused to recognize the union. Miller threatened to sue the league under antitrust laws in 1957 unless owners recognized the union. He testified before the U.S. Congress in NFL antitrust hearings that players were "mousetrapped" by the owners into disadvantageous contracts. Miller earned $1,000 a year to advocate for the union, a salary some players said in 1960 was unjustified because of his tense relations with NFL owners and failure to get the union recognized. In 1967, retired Browns defensive back Bernie Parrish said Miller did not do enough to meet the players' demands and Parrish tried to form his own union.

Miller served as the NFLPA's lawyer until 1968, when he resigned to focus on representing individual players as an agent negotiating contracts. The NFL officially recognized the union later in the year when the two sides negotiated their first collective bargaining agreement. Cleveland coach Paul Brown disliked Miller so much for his work with the NFLPA that he had him scrubbed from the Browns' 1946 team picture.

== Later career and death ==
Later in his career, Miller was a maritime law and asbestos law specialist, and represented Cleveland native George Steinbrenner's American Shipbuilding Company in the 1960s. An avid golfer, Miller won the Shaker Country Club championship seven times. He was inducted into the College Football Hall of Fame and the Delaware Sports Museum and Hall of Fame in 1976. Miller was found dead of a heart attack in 2002 after he failed to report to his law offices. He never married.

== See also ==
- List of college football yearly rushing leaders
