= Harry Miller (American football) =

American football player and coach

Biographical details
- Born: November 25, 1888; Defiance, Ohio, U.S.
- Died: November 13, 1968 (aged 79); Wilmington, Delaware, U.S.

Playing career
- 1906–1909: Notre Dame
- Position: Halfback

Coaching career (HC unless noted)
- 1910–1914: Creighton

Accomplishments and honors

Awards
- Third-team All-American (1909)

Martin Harry "Red" Miller (November 25, 1888 – November 13, 1968) was an American college football player and coach. A graduate and college football player at the University of Notre Dame, Miller served as the head football coach at Creighton University in Omaha, Nebraska from 1910 to 1914.

== Biography ==
A native of Defiance, Ohio, Miller was the oldest of four brothers (Don, Ray, Gerry, and Walter) to play for the Notre Dame Fighting Irish football team. He was Notre Dame's main halfback for four seasons and was captain of the 1908 Notre Dame Fighting Irish football team. He was the second Notre Dame player to win an All-American mention.

After graduating, Miller attended the Creighton University School of Law and coached the Creighton Bluejays football team. He earned his law degree in 1913 and was a legal counsel for DuPont's real estate division from 1915 to 1955.

He was the father of Notre Dame players Tom and Creighton Miller, the latter he named after Creighton University.

Miller died on November 13, 1968 at his home in Wilmington, Delaware.
