= Fred Kohler (politician) =

American politician

40th Mayor of Cleveland
- In office 1922–1923
- Preceded by: William S. Fitzgerald
- Succeeded by: William R. Hopkins

Personal details
- Born: William Rowland Hopkins; May 2, 1864 Cleveland, Ohio, U.S.
- Died: January 30, 1934 (aged 67) Cleveland, Ohio, U.S.
- Party: Republican
- Spouse: Josephine Modroch (m. 1888)

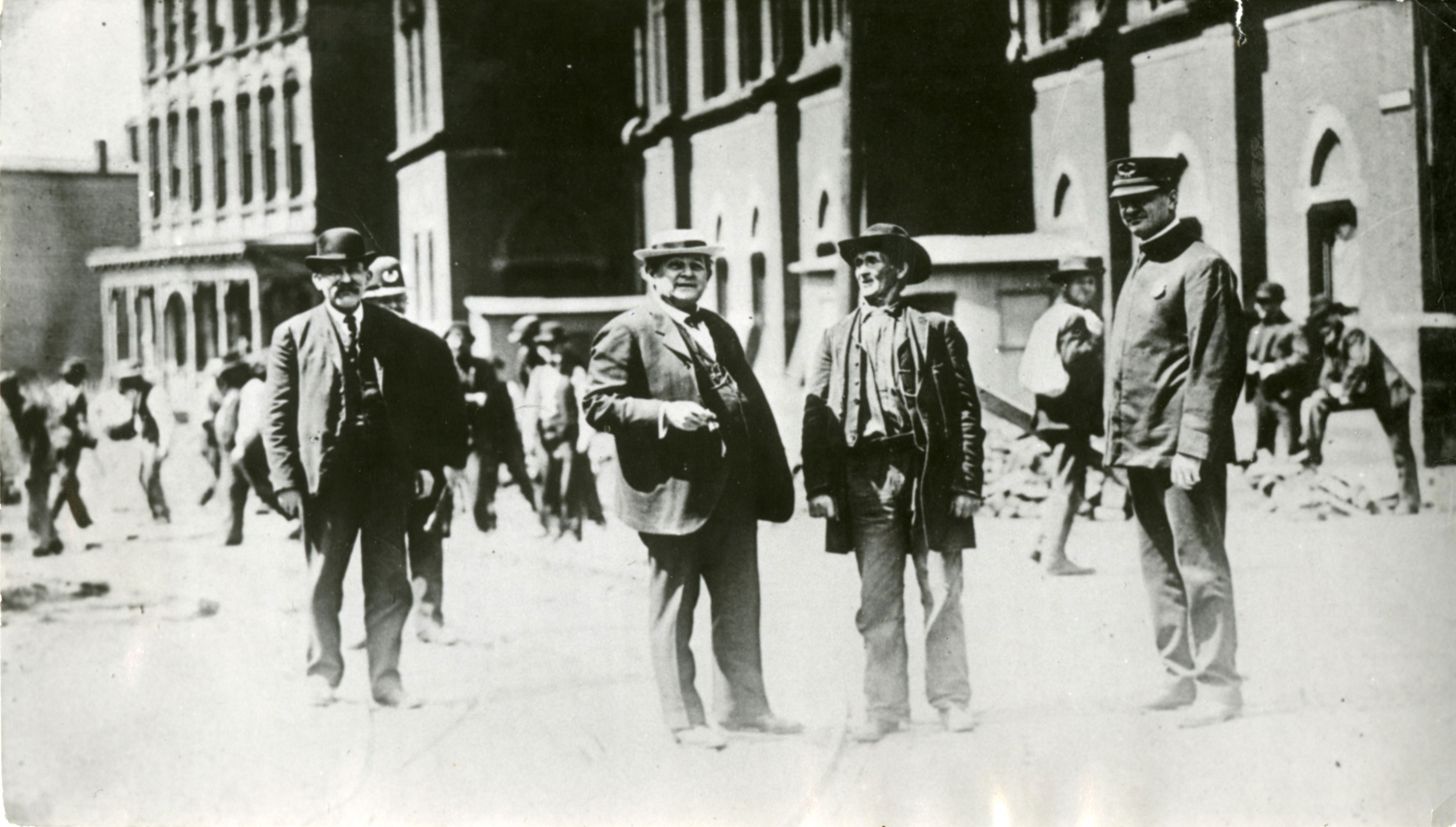
Police chief Kohler with Mayor Tom L. Johnson

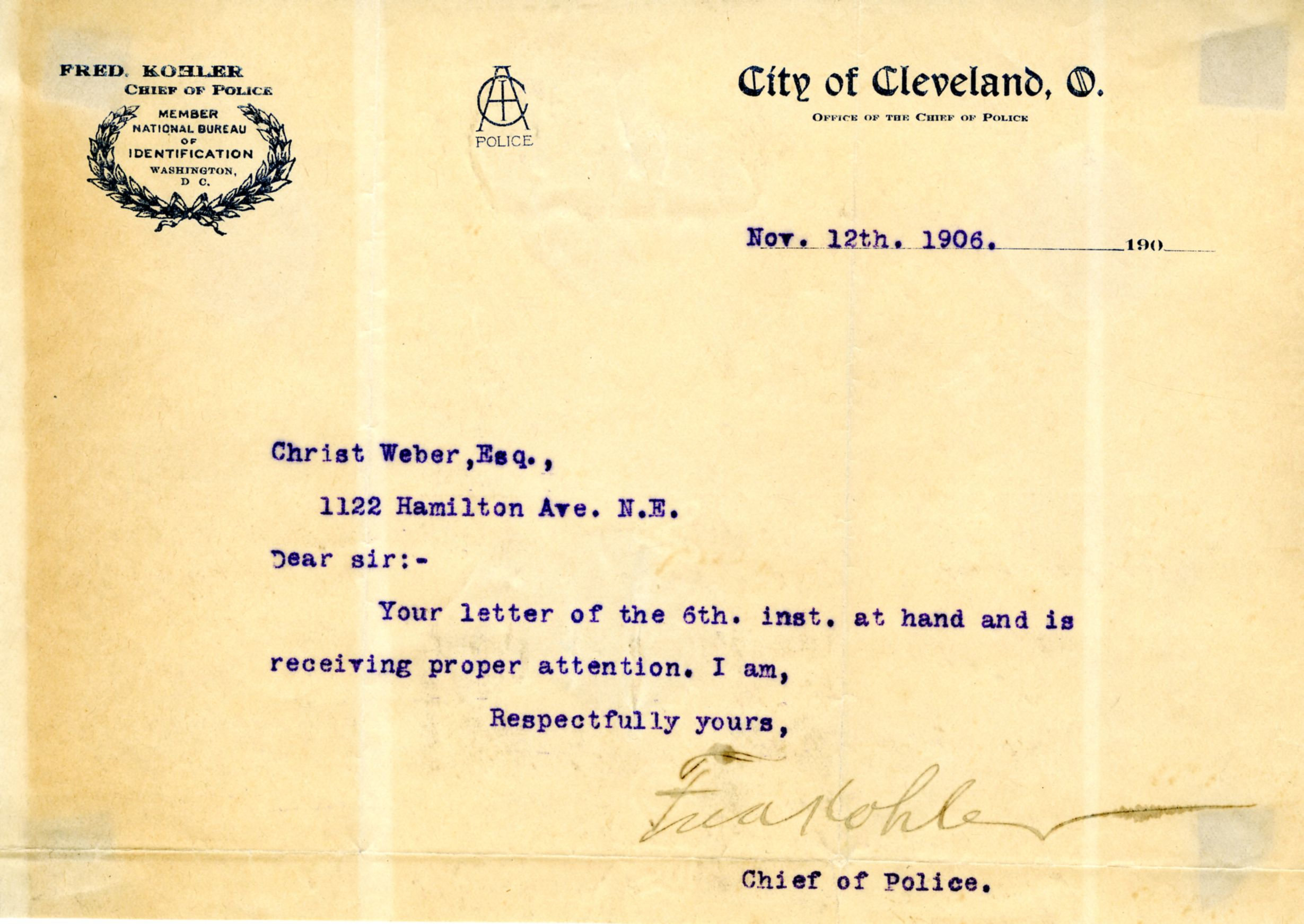
1906 letter of Fred Kohler as Chief of Police

Frederick Kohler (May 2, 1864 – January 30, 1934) was an American politician of the Republican Party who served as the 40th mayor of Cleveland, Ohio from 1922 to 1923.

== Life and career ==
Kohler was born in Cleveland to ethnic German parents Christian and Fredericka Kohler in 1864. As a teenager, he left school to assist his father in the Kohler Stone Works. The business failed after his father's death and Kohler sought work elsewhere.

In 1889, Kohler joined the Cleveland Police and quickly rose to prominence. By 1900, he was promoted to captain and in 1903, Mayor Tom L. Johnson appointed Kohler as his chief of police. He developed a reputation as a strict disciplinarian, with "all the prototypical traits of Kaiser Wilhelm's favorite field marshals." He always expected the absolute maximum from all policemen, "demanding a neat appearance and full day's work." While some, such as U.S. President Theodore Roosevelt, lauded him as "the best chief of police in America", he was disliked by established Cleveland politicians of both parties who disapproved of his contempt for the city's machine politics.

After Johnson left the mayor's office in 1909, opposition forces began gathering up to rid the city of Kohler. In 1913, Kohler was fired from his position by Civil Service Commission on charges of neglect of duty and gross immorality, after becoming wrapped up in an ugly divorce suit brought by a salesman against his adulterous wife. A month later, a gang of hired thugs mugged and brutally beat Kohler in an alley off the Short Vincent.

Kohler made it through the tussle and instead of leaving Cleveland, he decided to enter politics. In 1918, he was elected Cuyahoga County commissioner as a Republican, serving two terms. His tenure as commissioner served him well when he campaigned and was elected mayor of Cleveland. He served one term from 1922 to 1924. As mayor, Kohler concentrated on the "economy in city government, cutting payrolls and city services, and persuading private agencies to care for families on relief." However, Kohler started becoming unpopular again when he "cleaned up" City Hall by slashing municipal expenses and firing 850 patronage employees. In 1924, the city adopted a city manager plan, Kohler did not seek reelection as mayor and was elected sheriff instead. He left office in 1926, after being accused of underfeeding the prisoners in jail.

== Death ==
Kohler began to suffer from increasingly fragile health in 1930. He considered running for mayor again in 1931, but declined after his physicians advised him that his health would not bear the stress of a campaign. He vacationed in St. Petersburg, Florida, as usual in the winter of 1931–1932, but was forced to return home to Cleveland after suffering an undisclosed severe illness. Kohler often spent his summers traveling in Europe. On July 7, 1932, he was aboard the SS Champlain, nearing the United Kingdom, when he suffered a severe stroke that left him severely paralyzed. He was transferred to another vessel, and sent home. His entire left side was paralyzed, and he often suffered uncontrollable weeping.

Over the next 18 months, Kohler's health improved slightly. He could sit up, take automobile drives, and be wheeled to appointments. Toward the end of his life, he even attempted to walk again, although he could take only a few halting steps. At 10:30 AM on Monday, January 29, 1934, Kohler suffered a second, severe stroke. He lapsed into unconsciousness and died at 11 PM on January 30, 1934. He was buried at Lake View Cemetery in Cleveland.

Political offices
Preceded by William S. Fitzgerald	Mayor of Cleveland; 1922–1923	Succeeded by William R. Hopkins
