= Daniel E. Morgan =

American politician

42nd Mayor of Cleveland (officially City Manager)
- In office 1930–1931
- Preceded by: William R. Hopkins
- Succeeded by: Ray T. Miller

Personal details
- Born: August 7, 1877 Oak Hill, Ohio, U.S.
- Died: May 1, 1949 (aged 71) Cleveland Heights, Ohio, U.S.
- Party: Republican
- Spouses: Ella Annetta Mathews (m. 1915; died 1923) Wilma Ball (m. 1926)
- Children: Nancy Olwen, Amanda
- Education: Oberlin College (BA); Harvard Law School (JD)

Daniel Edgar Morgan (August 7, 1877 – May 1, 1949) was an American politician of the Republican party who served as the second and last city manager of Cleveland, Ohio, but is often regarded as the 42nd mayor of the city. He was the last member of Cleveland City Council to become mayor until Frank G. Jackson was elected in 2005.

== Life and career ==
Morgan was born in Oak Hill, Ohio, to Elias and Elizabeth Jones Morgan. In 1897, he received his Bachelor of Arts from Oberlin College and a Bachelor of Laws from Harvard Law School in 1901. He began practicing law in Cleveland and in 1909, was elected to Cleveland City Council as a Republican. He supported home rule and assisted in authoring the new city charter that supported the idea of a "large council with small wards" to provide for greater representation at the neighborhood level. After his tenure on City Council, Morgan became the first president of the City Club of Cleveland in 1912. He was elected an Ohio state senator in 1928 and developed a "reputation for improving pending legislation to make it more effective."

In 1924, Cleveland adopted a council–manager system. William R. Hopkins became the first person to hold the position, but when council felt that Hopkins was becoming too powerful, they elected Morgan to replace him in 1930. As city manager, he "opened all staff positions" for African Americans at City Hospital, negotiated utility rates, and persuaded Cuyahoga County officials to include a "$31 million bond issue on the ballot to pay for public works" to provide employment during the Great Depression. However, with fast rising unemployment, Morgan's financial plans for Depression aid did not last. In November 1931, the city manager plan was finally abolished and the city returned to a mayor–council government. Morgan ran for mayor in 1932, but lost to a former mayor Harry L. Davis. He returned to private practice and became a judge of the Ohio Court of Appeals in 1939, a position that he held for the rest of his life and career.

== Personal life ==
Morgan married Ella A. Mathews, a suffragette from Chicago, on April 22, 1915. She died on July 21, 1923, from complications after the birth of their first child, Nancy.

Morgan then married Wilma Ball in February 1926,

== Death ==
Morgan underwent surgery for an undisclosed reason in August 1948, but never fully recovered. He died at his home in Cleveland Heights, Ohio, on May 1, 1949. His funeral was held at Amasa Stone Chapel on the campus of Western Reserve College. He was interred at Lake View Cemetery in Cleveland.

Political offices
Preceded by William R. Hopkins	Mayor/City Manager of Cleveland; 1930–1931	Succeeded by Ray T. Miller
