= Don Miller (American football, born 1902) =

American football player and coach (1902–1979)

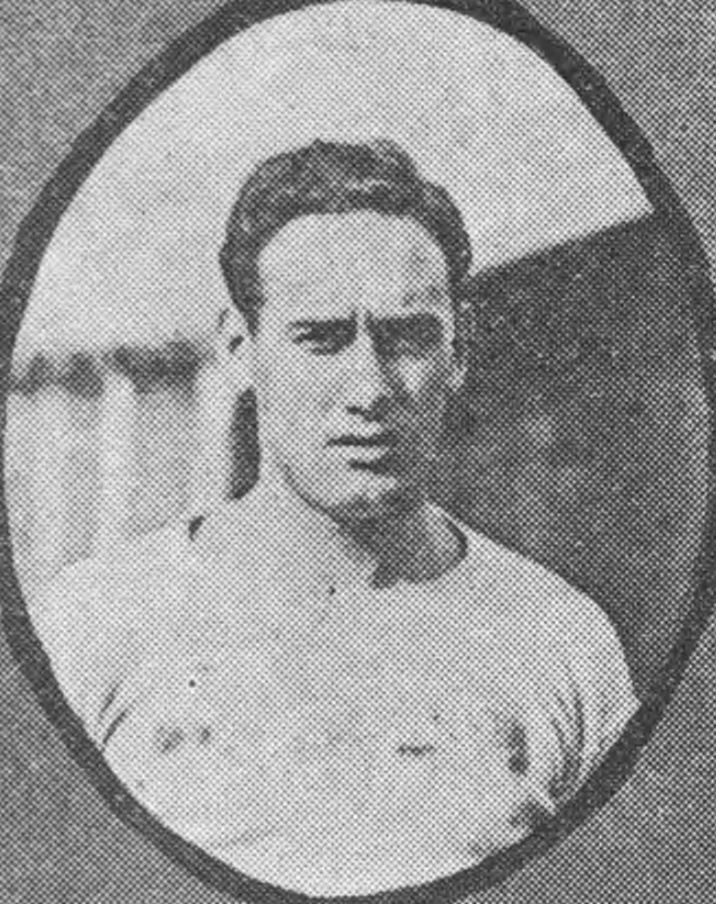
- Miller in 1925

Biographical details
- Born: March 29, 1902; Defiance, Ohio, U.S.
- Died: July 28, 1979 (aged 77); Cleveland, Ohio, U.S.

Playing career
- 1922–1924: Notre Dame
- 1925: Providence Steamrollers
- Position: Halfback

Coaching career (HC unless noted)
- 1925–1928: Georgia Tech (backfield)
- 1929–1932: Ohio State (backfield)

Accomplishments and honors

Championships
- National (1924)

Awards
- 2× All-American (1923, 1924)
- College Football Hall of Fame; Inducted in 1970 (profile)

Don "Midnight" Miller (March 29, 1902 – July 28, 1979) was an American football player and coach. He was one of the famous "Four Horsemen" of the University of Notre Dame's backfield in 1924, when the Fighting Irish won the 1924 National Title. Miller was inducted into the College Football Hall of Fame as a player in 1970.

== College career ==
Miller's four brothers attended Notre Dame before he did. The most famous of these being Harry "Red" Miller, captain of the 1908 squad. Notre Dame head coach Knute Rockne called Miller "the greatest open field runner I ever had." Another brother, Ray T. Miller, later had a lengthy career in politics in the Cleveland area.

In 2002, the NCAA published "NCAA Football's Finest," researched and compiled by the NCAA Statistics Service. For Miller they published the following statistics:

Year	Carries	Rushing Yards	Average	Receptions	Receiving Yards	Average	Touchdowns	Points
1922	87	472	5.4	6	144	24.0	5	30
1923	89	698	7.8	9	149	16.6	10	60
1924	107	763	7.1	16	297	18.6	7	42
Total	283	1933	6.8	31	590	19.0	22	132

== Professional football career ==
In 1925, Miller played professional football for the National Football League's Providence Steamrollers and the then-independent Hartford Blues.

After his playing career, Miller coached at several colleges, including Georgia Tech and Ohio State. He became the head football coach of St. Xavier High School of Louisville, Kentucky in 1934.

== Law career ==
Miller eventually quit coaching and practiced law, in which he was successful in the Cleveland area.

On February 5, 1957, Miller appeared on To Tell the Truth.
