= Harry L. Davis =

American politician (1878–1950)

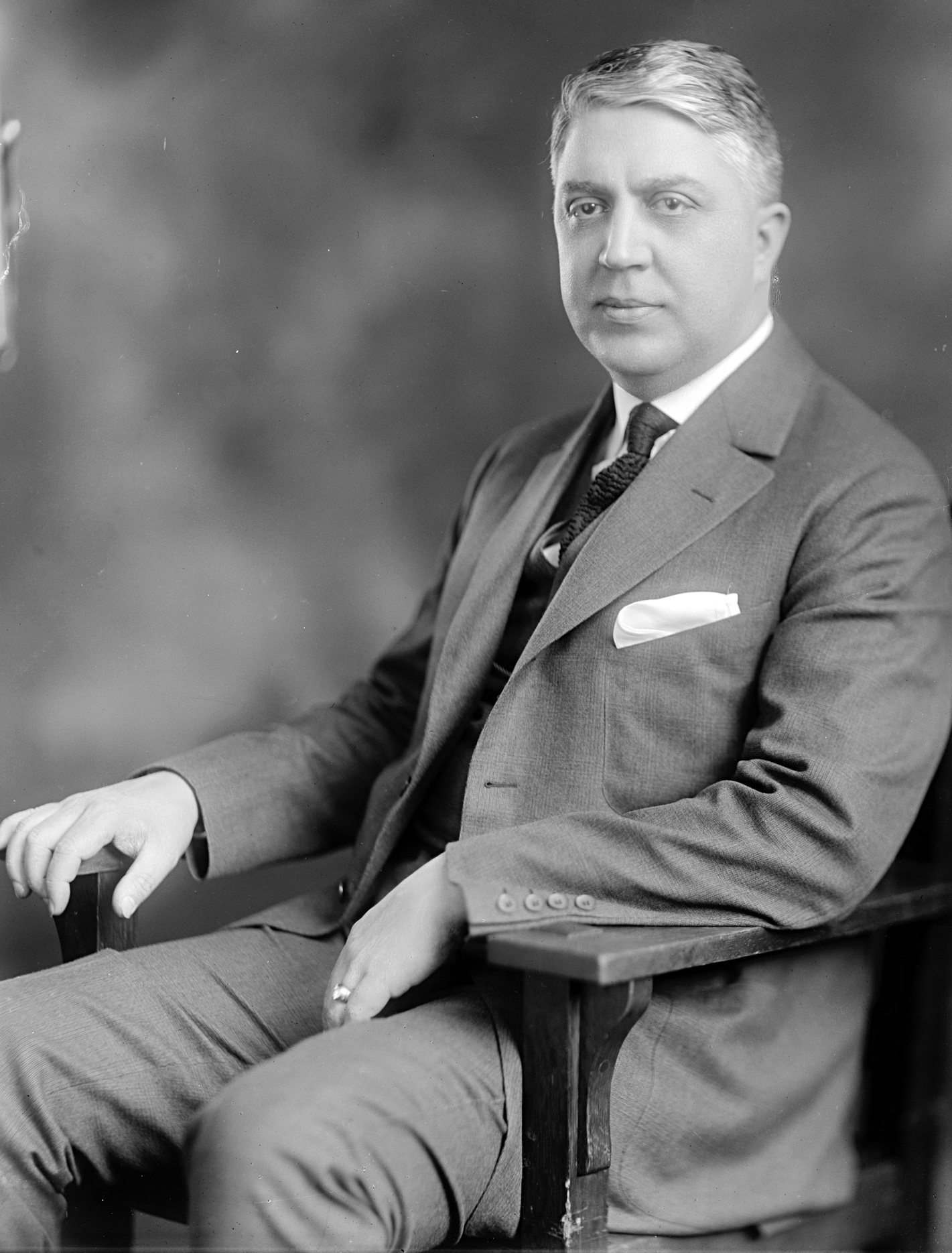
- Davis, 1905–1945

49th Governor of Ohio
- In office January 10, 1921 – January 8, 1923
- Lieutenant: Clarence J. Brown
- Preceded by: James M. Cox
- Succeeded by: A. Victor Donahey

38th and 44th Mayor of Cleveland
- In office 1916–1919
- Preceded by: Newton D. Baker
- Succeeded by: William S. Fitzgerald
- In office 1934–1935
- Preceded by: Ray T. Miller
- Succeeded by: Harold Hitz Burton

Personal details
- Born: Harry Lyman Davis; January 25, 1878 Cleveland, Ohio, U.S.
- Died: May 21, 1950 (aged 72) Cleveland, Ohio, U.S.
- Resting place: Lake View Cemetery, Cleveland, Ohio, U.S.
- Party: Republican

Harry Lyman Davis (January 25, 1878 – May 21, 1950) was an American politician of the Republican Party. He served as the 38th and 44th mayor of Cleveland, Ohio and as the 49th governor of Ohio.

== Life and career ==
Davis was born in Cleveland, Ohio on January 25, 1878 in the Newburgh area to Evan and Barbara Jones Davis. He was of English and Welsh ancestry, all of his ancestors having emigrated to North America from Great Britain during the era of the Thirteen Colonies. At age thirteen, he left school to work in the steel mills, studying at home and night school. He became a solicitor for the Cleveland Telephone Co. at age twenty-one and later founded the Davis Rate Adjustment Co., selling telephone securities and the Harry L. Davis Co., selling insurance.

In 1909, Davis was elected Republican city treasurer. David defeated his opponent Peter Witt in the 1915 Cleveland mayoral election. As the city's new mayor, Davis established the Mayor's Advisory War Committee in 1917 to aid the American effort in World War I. As mayor Davis reached out to and supported immigrant ethnic communities in Cleveland. The Polish-American community voted for him "almost unanimously" in his 1915 mayoral election and supported him throughout the rest of his political career. He was known for being sensitive to the concerns of Polish immigrants and Italian immigrants in Cleveland. His work gained national recognition. Mayor Davis also had to deal with the communist May Day Riots of 1919 and the bombing of his home by communist agitators; the Red Scare presented a new set of dilemmas. Davis responded to the outrages by campaigning for the expulsion of all "Bolsheviks" from America. Since 1919 was an election year, Davis resigned from the mayor's office and went on to successfully campaign for governor of Ohio. The Communist Party USA and the Socialist Party of America both unsuccessfully campaigned against him.

Davis won the governor's seat and served one term. While in office, Davis restructured the executive branch to include a cabinet of seven directors to help administer state affairs. Davis did not run again in 1922, but rather 1924, when he was soundly defeated by incumbent A. Victor Donahey. Davis later returned to Cleveland and became a strong opponent of the city manager plan. He later served again as mayor from 1934 to 1935.

== Death ==
In his later years, Davis suffered from frequent periods of ill health. He died at his home in Shaker Heights, Ohio, on May 21, 1950, soon after he was stricken with a blood clot in the brain. He was buried at Lake View Cemetery in Cleveland.

Political offices
Preceded by Newton D. Baker	Mayor of Cleveland; 1916–1919	Succeeded by William S. Fitzgerald
Preceded by James M. Cox	Governor of Ohio; 1921–1923	Succeeded by A. Victor Donahey
Preceded by Ray T. Miller	Mayor of Cleveland; 1934–1935	Succeeded by Harold H. Burton
Party political offices
Preceded by Frank B. Willis	Republican Party nominee for Governor of Ohio; 1920	Succeeded by Carmi Thompson
Preceded by Carmi Thompson	Republican Party nominee for Governor of Ohio; 1924	Succeeded by Myers Y. Cooper
