= 1906 Lincoln Tigers football team =

American college football season

1906 Lincoln Tigers football
- Conference: Independent
- Record: 6–1 (8 played)
- Head coach: Romeo West (2nd season)

1906 Midwestern college football independents records
	Conf.			Overall
Team	W	L	T	W		L		T
Saint Louis		–		11	–	0	–	0
North Dakota Agricultural		–		5	–	0	–	0
Butler		–		1	–	0	–	0
Michigan State Normal		–		5	–	0	–	1
Iowa State		–		9	–	1	–	0
Ohio		–		7	–	1	–	0
Notre Dame		–		6	–	1	–	0
St. Mary's (OH)		–		5	–	1	–	0
Fairmount		–		7	–	1	–	2
Wabash		–		5	–	1	–	1
South Dakota State		–		3	–	1	–	0
Kansas		–		7	–	2	–	2
Kansas State		–		5	–	2	–	0
Missouri		–		5	–	2	–	1
Detroit College		–		4	–	2	–	1
Northern Illinois State		–		4	–	2	–	1
Carthage		–		3	–	2	–	0
Lake Forest		–		3	–	2	–	0
Nebraska		–		6	–	4	–	0
Wittenberg		–		5	–	4	–	1
Heidelberg		–		3	–	3	–	1
Washington University		–		2	–	2	–	2
Beloit		–		3	–	4	–	1
Franklin		–		3	–	4	–	0
Doane		–		2	–	3	–	0
Shurtleff		–		2	–	4	–	2
Western State Normal		–		1	–	2	–	0
Mount Union		–		2	–	5	–	1
Drake		–		2	–	5	–	0
Haskell		–		2	–	5	–	0
Marquette		–		1	–	4	–	2
Chicago P&S		–		0	–	1	–	1
Cincinnati		–		0	–	7	–	2
Western Illinois		–		0	–	3	–	0

The 1906 Lincoln Tigers football team represented Lincoln Institute—now known as Lincoln University—in Jefferson City, Missouri as an independent during the 1906 college football season. The Lincoln football team finished the season with an impressive record of 6–1. The six wins in one season set the record for most in a single season for Lincoln. This win total was only matched in 1931 and not surpassed until 1951, with the record having stood for an astounding 45 years.

== Schedule ==
Date	Time	Opponent	Site	Result	Source
		Meharry Medical College		L 5–11	
		Sumner High School		W 8–0	
October 27		at Fisk	Fisk University; Nashville, TN	W 9–5	
November 12		Columbia High School	Lincoln Institute Diamond; Jefferson City, MO	W 45–0	
November 17		George R. Smith	Lincoln Institute Diamond; Jefferson City, MO		
November 23	1:30 p.m.	at Western University (KS)	Association Park; Kansas City, MO	W 14–0	
November 23	3:00 p.m.	at Lawrence Athletics	Association Park; Kansas City, MO	W 44–0	
November 29		Columbia Tigers	West Field Diamond; Jefferson City, MO	W 47–0 or 28–0	
