= 1906 Miami Redskins football team =

American college football season

1906 Miami Redskins football
- Conference: Independent
- Record: 1–5–1
- Head coach: Arthur H. Parmelee (1st season)
- Home stadium: Miami Field

1906 Midwestern college football independents records
	Conf.			Overall
Team	W	L	T	W		L		T
Saint Louis		–		11	–	0	–	0
North Dakota Agricultural		–		5	–	0	–	0
Butler		–		1	–	0	–	0
Michigan State Normal		–		5	–	0	–	1
Iowa State		–		9	–	1	–	0
Ohio		–		7	–	1	–	0
Notre Dame		–		6	–	1	–	0
St. Mary's (OH)		–		5	–	1	–	0
Fairmount		–		7	–	1	–	2
Wabash		–		5	–	1	–	1
South Dakota State		–		3	–	1	–	0
Kansas		–		7	–	2	–	2
Kansas State		–		5	–	2	–	0
Missouri		–		5	–	2	–	1
Detroit College		–		4	–	2	–	1
Northern Illinois State		–		4	–	2	–	1
Carthage		–		3	–	2	–	0
Lake Forest		–		3	–	2	–	0
Nebraska		–		6	–	4	–	0
Wittenberg		–		5	–	4	–	1
Heidelberg		–		3	–	3	–	1
Washington University		–		2	–	2	–	2
Beloit		–		3	–	4	–	1
Franklin		–		3	–	4	–	0
Doane		–		2	–	3	–	0
Shurtleff		–		2	–	4	–	2
Western State Normal		–		1	–	2	–	0
Mount Union		–		2	–	5	–	1
Drake		–		2	–	5	–	0
Haskell		–		2	–	5	–	0
Marquette		–		1	–	4	–	2
Chicago P&S		–		0	–	1	–	1
Cincinnati		–		0	–	7	–	2
Western Illinois		–		0	–	3	–	0

The 1906 Miami Redskins football team was an American football team that represented Miami University during the 1906 college football season. Led by coach Arthur H. Parmelee in his first year, Miami compiled a 1–5–1 record, being outscored 16 to 55.

== Schedule ==
Date	Time	Opponent	Site	Result	Attendance	Source
September 29		Georgetown (KY)	Miami Field; Oxford, OH	W 16–0		
October 13	3:15 p.m.	at Cincinnati	Burnet Woods; Cincinnati, OH (rivalry)	T 0–0		
October 20		Wittenberg	Miami Field; Oxford, OH	L 0–11		
October 27		at Centre	Danville, KY	L 0–8		
November 3		Marietta	Miami Field; Oxford, OH	L 0–6		
November 17		at Earlham	Richmond, IN	L 0–11		
November 24		at DePauw	Greencastle, IN	L 0–19	800	
