= Drake Stadium =

Drake Stadium may refer to:

- Drake Stadium (1904), a defunct outdoor multiuse sports field at Drake University used from 1904 to 1925
- Drake Stadium (Drake University), an outdoor multiuse sports field at Drake University used from 1925 to present
- Drake Stadium (UCLA), an outdoor multiuse sports field at UCLA

== See also ==
- Drake Field (stadium), a defunct outdoor sports stadium on the campus of Auburn University
