= Arthur H. Parmelee =

American physician and football coach (1883–1961)

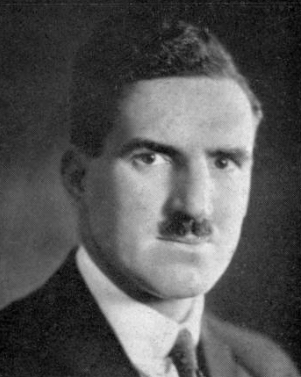
- Born: Arthur Hawley Parmelee; September 25, 1883; Redfield, South Dakota, U.S.
- Died: June 5, 1961 (aged 77); Los Angeles, California, U.S.
- Resting place: Santa Barbara Cemetery
- Occupations: Mailman; Football coach; Physician
- Employers: US Postal Service; Miami University; Rush Medical College; Children's Hospital Los Angeles; USC College of Medicine
- Coaching career

Playing career
- early 1900s: Beloit
- Position(s): Left tackle

Coaching career (HC unless noted)
- 1906: Miami (OH)

Head coaching record
- Overall: 1–5–1

Arthur Hawley Parmelee (September 25, 1883 – June 5, 1961) was an American physician and college football coach.

== Early life ==
Parmelee was born on September 25, 1883, in Redfield, South Dakota. In 1891, he moved with his family to West Salem, Wisconsin, where he graduated from West Salem High School in 1900. After a year working as a mail carrier he entered Beloit College where he received his bachelor's degree in 1905. While at Beloit he played left tackle on the football team.

== College coach ==
After graduation Parmelee took a position at Miami University in Oxford, Ohio. While at Miami, he served both as the General Secretary of the campus YMCA and head football coach. In 1906, his only season as football coach, he completed a 1–5–1 record. After a 16–0 victory over Georgetown College in the first game, Parmelee's team did not score again the rest of the season, losing the rest of the games except a 0–0 tie with arch-rival Cincinnati.

=== Head coaching record ===
Year	Team	Overall	Conference	Standing	Bowl/playoffs
Miami Redskins (Independent) (1906)
1906	Miami	1–5–1			
Miami:		1–5–1			
Total:		1–5–1			

== Medical career ==
In 1907 Parmelee entered Rush Medical College, where he graduated in 1911. He served internship at Kansas City General Hospital and then became an assistant to Dr. John Cross in Minneapolis. In 1913 he moved to Oak Park, Illinois, to open a practice where he specialized in pediatrics. Eventually he would also take a position the pediatric department at Rush Medical College. In 1924 he departed for Vienna, Austria to study with Clemens von Pirquet, at the time the leading pediatrician in Europe, He would return to Vienna for additional study in 1931 and 1932. In 1947 he left his private practice and resigned from the pediatric department at Rush. He moved to Los Angeles and became a member of the Staff at Children's Hospital Los Angeles. In addition he was a Pediatric Consultant to the Bureau of Maternal and Child Health of the California State Department of Public Health, and Clinical Professor of Pediatrics at the USC School of Medicine.

Parmelee had a deep interest in the disorders of the newborn. He published, 44 articles with 24 were directly related to this aspect of pediatrics helping in diagnosis and treatment including early intestinal obstruction, congenital lung cysts, congenital syphilis, congenital goiter, and diaphragmatic hernia. His most significant article was a 1935 article in the American Journal of Diseases of Children titled "The Pathology of Steatorrhea" where he was the first to recognize congenital steatorrhea (cystic fibrosis of the pancreas) as a separate disease unrelated to other steatorrheas, including celiac disease. His work developed into a serious examination of the factors that influence the health of newborn babies. He compiled his observations into a book Management of the Newborn. Additionally, he collaborated in several textbooks including Brennemann's Practice of Pediatrics and The Child in Health and Disease.

== Death ==
Parmelee died on June 5, 1961, of a cerebral hemorrhage at the UCLA Medical Center. He was buried at Santa Barbara Cemetery.
