= 1906 Hillsdale Dales football team =

American college football season

1906 Hillsdale football
- Conference: Michigan Intercollegiate Athletic Association
- Record: 0–7 (0–5 MIAA)
- Head coach: William Boone (1st season)
- Captain: Main

The 1906 Hillsdale Dales football team represented Hillsdale College in the 1906 college football season.

== Schedule ==
Date	Opponent	Site	Result	Attendance	Source
October 13	at Notre Dame*	Cartier Field; Notre Dame, IN	L 0–17		
October 26	Olivet	Hillsdale, MI	L 0–17		
October 29	at Albion	Albion, MI	L 0–10	750	
November 3	at Detroit Athletic Club*	DAC field; Detroit, MI	L 0–17		
	Alma		L 5–11		
November 17	Michigan Agricultural	Hillsdale, MI	L 9–35		
November 27	at Michigan State Normal	Ypsilanti, MI	L 6–10	3,000	
*Non-conference game
