= 1906 Michigan Agricultural Aggies football team =

American college football season

1906 Michigan Agricultural Aggies football
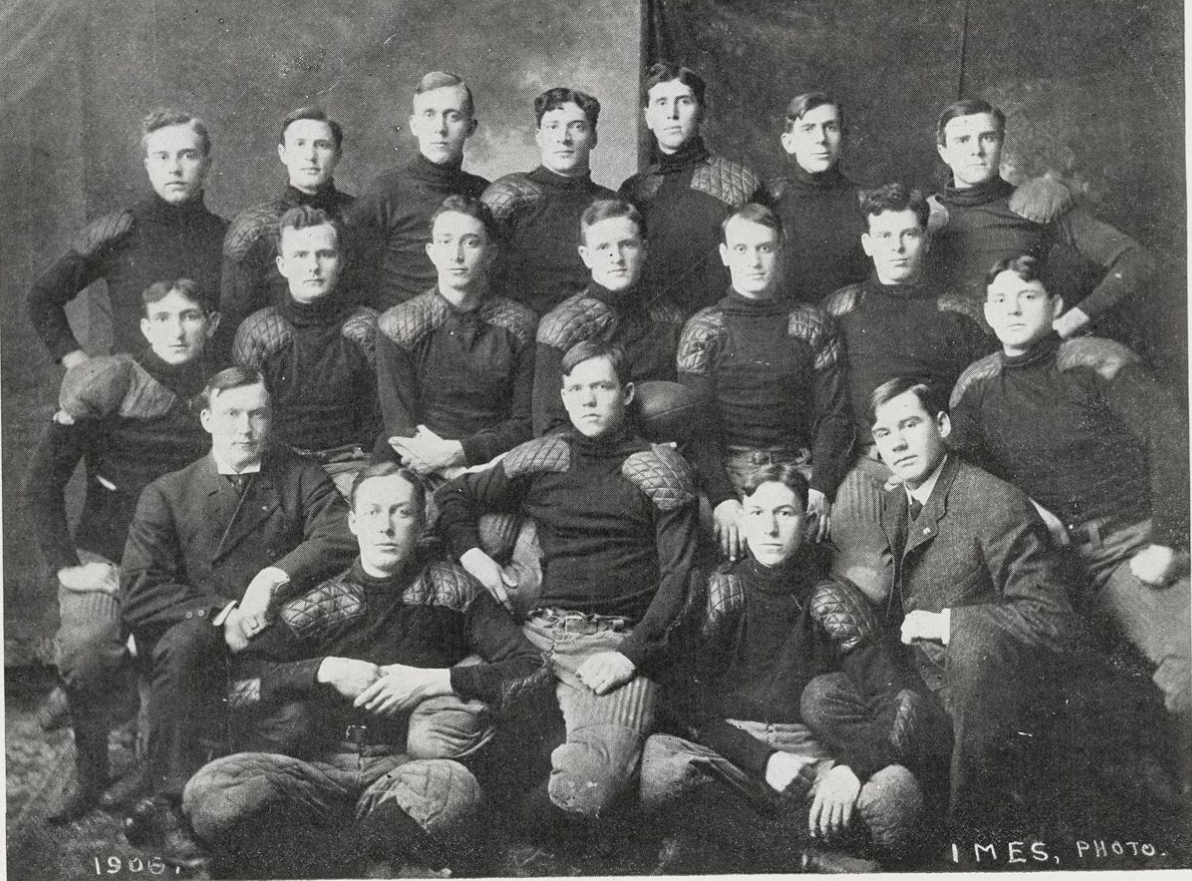
- Conference: Michigan Intercollegiate Athletic Association
- Record: 7–2–2 (7–1–1 MIAA)
- Head coach: Chester Brewer (4th season)
- Captain: Stephen W. Doty
- Home stadium: College Field

The 1906 Michigan Agricultural Aggies football team was an American football team that represented Michigan Agricultural College (now known as Michigan State University) as a member of the Michigan Intercollegiate Athletic Association (MIAA) during the 1906 college football season. In their fourth year under head coach Chester Brewer, the Aggies compiled a 7–2–2 record (7–1–1 in MIAA games), shut out six of their eleven opponents, and outscored all opponents by a total of 195 to 32.

== Schedule ==
Date	Time	Opponent	Site	Result	Attendance	Source
September 29		Olivet	College Field; East Lansing, MI	W 23–4		
October 6		at Alma	Alma, MI	T 0–0		
October 13	3:15 p.m.	Kalamazoo	College Field; East Lansing, MI	W 38–0		
October 20		DePauw	College Field; East Lansing, MI	W 33–0	1,500	
October 27		at Notre Dame*	Cartier Field; Notre Dame, IN (rivalry)	L 0–5		
November 3		Albion	College Field; East Lansing, MI	W 37–0		
November 10		at Albion	Winter-Lau Field; Albion, MI	W 5–0	750	
November 12		Alma	College Field; East Lansing, MI	W 12–0		
November 17		at Hillsdale	Hillsdale, MI	W 35–9		
November 24		at Olivet	Olivet, MI	L 6–8		
November 29		at Detroit Athletic Club*	D. A. C. Field; Detroit, MI	T 6–6		
*Non-conference game
