= William Foley (American football) =

American football coach

Playing career
- 1905–1906: Cincinnati

Coaching career (HC unless noted)
- 1906: Cincinnati

Head coaching record
- Overall: 0–7–2

William Foley was an American college football player and coach. He served as the head football coach at the University of Cincinnati for one season, in 1906, compiling a record of 0–7–2. Foley was also captain of the 1905 Cincinnati football team.

== Head coaching record ==
Year	Team	Overall	Conference	Standing	Bowl/playoffs
Cincinnati (Independent) (1906)
1906	Cincinnati	0–7–2			
Cincinnati:		0–7–2			
Total:		0–7–2			
