= Tubby Meyers =

American football player and coach (1887–1940)

Biographical details
- Born: September 5, 1887; Gobleville, Michigan, U.S.
- Died: May 2, 1940 (aged 52); Sarnia, Ontario, U.S.

Playing career
- 1906–1908: Western State Normal
- Position: Halfback

Coaching career (HC unless noted)
- 1906: Western State Normal

Head coaching record
- Overall: 1–3

Melvin J. "Tubby" Meyers (September 5, 1887 – May 2, 1940), sometimes spelled "Myers," was an American college football player and coach. He was the first head coach and first captain of the Western State Normal football program, holding both titles as a player-coach during the 1906 college football season.

== Early life ==
Meyers was born in Gobleville, Michigan in 1887, and moved with his family to Kalamazoo, Michigan in 1895. His father, Rollie Meyers was a Michigan native who worked as a mail clerk at the post office. His mother, Vivia Meyers, was an Ohio native. He had an older brother, Rauel, a younger brother, Carl, and a younger sister, Fern.

== Education and career ==
Meyers enrolled at the Western State Normal School (now known as Western Michigan University) in Kalamazoo as a student in the Manual Training department. He was the coach, captain and halfback for the football team in the school's inaugural season of college football in 1906. He is recognized both as the first head football coach and "the first great player" in the history of the Western Michigan Broncos football program.

After graduating from Western State Normal in 1909, Myers was hired by Port Huron High School in Port Huron, Michigan. He served as supervisor of manual training and director of athletics at the school. He also served for many years as the school's football coach. In June 1917, Myers completed a draft registration card stating that he was employed at Port Huron High School as a manual training and athletics instructor.

In 1920, he was married to Mary "Mayme" McCallum (1887–1978) at Port Huron. At the time of the 1920 United States census, Meyers was living with his wife, Mary A. Meyers, in Port Huron. His occupation was listed as a teacher in a high school. As of 1925, he was serving in the National Guard with the rank of first lieutenant. At the time of the 1930 United States census, Meyers and his wife continued to reside in Port Huron. They had a daughter, Minola A. Meyers. His occupation was listed in 1930 as a teacher of manual arts. McCallum died in 1942 at Port Huron.

In 1939, he became the business manager and purchasing agent for the Port Huron board of education. He died at age in May 1940 after collapsing at the Masonic Temple in Sarnia.

Since 1947, the "Tubby Meyers Award" has been presented each year to the outstanding player on the Port Huron High School football team.

== Head coaching record ==
Year	Team	Overall	Conference	Standing	Bowl/playoffs
Western State Normal Hilltoppers (Independent) (1906)
1906	Western State Normal	1–3			
Western State Normal:		1–3			
Total:		1–3			
