= Thomas A. Barry =

American football player and coach, lawyer, industrial adviser (c. 1879–1947)

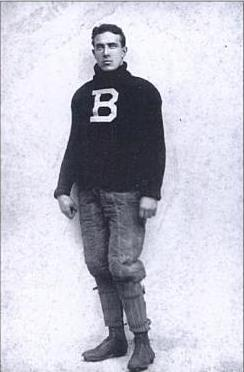
- Barry at Brown University, c. 1902

Biographical details
- Born: c. 1879; Brockton, Massachusetts, U.S.
- Died: December 27, 1947 (aged 68); Hollywood, Florida, U.S.

Playing career

Football
- 1899–1902: Brown
- Position: Halfback

Coaching career (HC unless noted)

Football
- 1903: Bowdoin (assistant)
- 1904: Tulane
- 1906–1907: Notre Dame
- 1908–1910: Wisconsin
- 1911: Denver

Baseball
- 1908–1911: Wisconsin
- 1911: Denver

Head coaching record
- Overall: 31–9–5 (football)

Accomplishments and honors

Awards
- Consensus All-American (1902)

Thomas Austin Barry (c. 1879 – December 27, 1947) was an American college football coach and player, lawyer, and industrial adviser. He served as the head football coach at Tulane University, the University of Notre Dame, the University of Wisconsin, and the University of Denver. Barry attended Harvard Law School and Brown University, where he played on the football team and was named an All-American in 1902.

== Early life ==
A native of Brockton, Massachusetts, Barry attended Brown University, where he played on the football team, and received varsity letters in 1899, 1900, and 1902. He served as the team captain in 1902, and led Brown to its first win against Pennsylvania, 15–6, in which he scored all of his team's points. Barry scored on a 50- and 31-yard run and a 28-yard field goal. It was the first time he had ever attempted to kick a field goal. That season, Caspar Whitney named him to his All-America first team and Walter Camp named him to his second team. He also played on the baseball team, and The Boston Post later wrote, "he became pioneer in the art of stealing home and not once in his college career did he fail to beat the throw to the plate. He stole home against Harvard, Dartmouth, and Yale." Barry graduated from Brown in 1903. He later graduated from Harvard Law School.

== Coaching career ==
After graduation from Brown, Barry coached the football team at Bowdoin College in 1903. The following year, he played minor league baseball for Albany in the Eastern League, and coached football at Tulane. During the 1904 season, he led the Olive and Blue to a 5–2 record. Barry coached Notre Dame from 1906 to 1907 and amassed a 12–1–1 record. Several years earlier the Western Conference (now the Big Ten) had denied Notre Dame admission because of its small enrollment. In hopes it would help gain an invitation, Barry ensured Notre Dame followed the Western Conference regulations, but to no avail. In a Notre Dame alumni publication in 1931, an article titled "Coaches Before Rockne" wrote of him:

Barry had a good system of coaching. He believed in leading his men, never in pushing them, and in giving every man a fair trial, playing no favorites ... A proof of Barry's football knowledge came forward in 1907. The material was terrible and things looked mighty gloomy. He knew his men, however ... the team was tied for championship honors [with Indiana].

Barry left Notre Dame to take over as the coach of the football and baseball teams at Wisconsin from 1908 to 1910. In football, he amassed a 9–4–3 record. Notre Dame invited Barry back as its head coach, but he declined to pursue his career in law. In January 1911, the University of Denver hired him as its head football and baseball coach, and Barry coached the football team to a 5–2–1 record in his only season there.

== Later life and legacy ==
In 1944, Barry retired from practicing law and moved from Providence, Rhode Island, to Hollywood, Florida, where he remained until his death. He died in his home on December 27, 1947, at the age of 68. Barry has been inducted into the Brown University Athletic Hall of Fame. In February 1947, The Boston Post named him to the "All-Time Big Ten" of Brockton athletics, and the article's author wrote "Tom Barry was undoubtedly the most distinguished athlete Brockton has ever produced". Fighting Irish football legend Knute Rockne called Barry "the man who laid the football foundation at Notre Dame."

== Head coaching record ==
=== Football ===
Year	Team	Overall	Conference	Standing
Tulane Olive and Blue (Southern Intercollegiate Athletic Association) (1904)
1904	Tulane	5–2	3–2	
Tulane:		5–2	3–2	
Notre Dame (Independent) (1906–1907)
1906	Notre Dame	6–1		
1907	Notre Dame	6–0–1		
Notre Dame:		12–1–1		
Wisconsin Badgers (Western Conference) (1908–1910)
1908	Wisconsin	5–1	2–1	3rd
1909	Wisconsin	3–1–1	2–1–1	4th
1910	Wisconsin	1–2–2	1–2–1	T–5th
Wisconsin:		9–4–3	5–4–2	
Denver Ministers (Rocky Mountain Conference) (1911)
1911	Denver	5–2–1	3–1–1	T–2nd
Denver:		5–2–1	3–1–1	
Total:		31–9–5		
