= Bob Bracken (American football) =

American football player (1885–1965)

Notre Dame Fighting Irish
- Positions: Quarterback, halfback

Personal information
- Born: January 4, 1885; Polo, Illinois, U.S.
- Died: July 29, 1965 (aged 80)

Career information
- College: Notre Dame (1904–1906)

Robert Louis Bracken (January 4, 1885 – July 29, 1965) was an American football player and a starting quarterback for the University of Notre Dame.

In his first two years playing for the Fighting Irish squad, Bracken started at halfback. He was given the starting job at quarterback for his senior year in 1906, and led the team to a 6–1 record, including wins over Michigan State and Purdue, with the lone loss suffered at Indiana.

Bracken was made an assistant to head coach Thomas A. Barry in 1907, and then graduated from Notre Dame Law School in 1908, eventually becoming an attorney back in his home town of Polo, Illinois. By the early 1930s, he had been appointed as a judge in nearby Dixon, Illinois.
