= 1906 Notre Dame football team =

American college football season

1906 Notre Dame football
- Conference: Independent
- Record: 6–1
- Head coach: Thomas A. Barry (1st season)
- Captain: Bob Bracken
- Home stadium: Cartier Field

1906 Midwestern college football independents records
	Conf.			Overall
Team	W	L	T	W		L		T
Saint Louis		–		11	–	0	–	0
North Dakota Agricultural		–		5	–	0	–	0
Butler		–		1	–	0	–	0
Michigan State Normal		–		5	–	0	–	1
Iowa State		–		9	–	1	–	0
Ohio		–		7	–	1	–	0
Notre Dame		–		6	–	1	–	0
St. Mary's (OH)		–		5	–	1	–	0
Fairmount		–		7	–	1	–	2
Wabash		–		5	–	1	–	1
South Dakota State		–		3	–	1	–	0
Kansas		–		7	–	2	–	2
Kansas State		–		5	–	2	–	0
Missouri		–		5	–	2	–	1
Detroit College		–		4	–	2	–	1
Northern Illinois State		–		4	–	2	–	1
Carthage		–		3	–	2	–	0
Lake Forest		–		3	–	2	–	0
Nebraska		–		6	–	4	–	0
Wittenberg		–		5	–	4	–	1
Heidelberg		–		3	–	3	–	1
Washington University		–		2	–	2	–	2
Beloit		–		3	–	4	–	1
Franklin		–		3	–	4	–	0
Doane		–		2	–	3	–	0
Shurtleff		–		2	–	4	–	2
Western State Normal		–		1	–	2	–	0
Mount Union		–		2	–	5	–	1
Drake		–		2	–	5	–	0
Haskell		–		2	–	5	–	0
Marquette		–		1	–	4	–	2
Chicago P&S		–		0	–	1	–	1
Cincinnati		–		0	–	7	–	2
Western Illinois		–		0	–	3	–	0

The 1906 Notre Dame football team was an American football team that represented the University of Notre Dame as an independent during the 1906 college football season. In their first season under head coach Thomas A. Barry, the team compiled a 6–1 record, shut out six of seven opponents (including rivals Michigan Agricultural and Purdue), and outscored all opponents by a total of 107 to 12. The team's only setback and the only points allowed were in a 12–0 loss to Indiana.

No Notre Dame players received honors on the 1906 All-America college football team or the 1906 All-Western college football team. Quarterback Bob Bracken was the team captain. Notre Dame's 1905 captain Patrick Beacon, a 230-pound tackle, returned to the team in 1906 as the team's leading scorer with three touchdowns against Franklin, two against Hillsdale, three against Chicago Physicians & Surgeons, and two against Beloit.

The team played its home games at Cartier Field in Notre Dame, Indiana.

== Schedule ==
Date	Opponent	Site	Result	Source
October 6	Franklin (IN)	Cartier Field; Notre Dame, IN	W 26–0	
October 13	Hillsdale	Cartier Field; Notre Dame, IN	W 17–0	
October 20	Chicago Physicians and Surgeons	Cartier Field; Notre Dame, IN	W 28–0	
October 27	Michigan Agricultural	Cartier Field; Notre Dame, IN (rivalry)	W 5–0	
November 3	at Purdue	Stuart Field; West Lafayette, IN (rivalry)	W 2–0	
November 10	vs. Indiana	Washington Park; Indianapolis, IN	L 0–12	
November 17	Beloit	Cartier Field; Notre Dame, IN	W 29–0	

== Personnel ==
=== Players ===
First team

- Patrick Beacon, tackle, 6'2", 230 pounds
- Bob Bracken, captain and quarterback, 6', 155 pounds
- Dom Callicrate, halfback, 5'10-1/2", 165 pounds
- John Deiner, halfback, 6', 190 pounds
- Sam Dolan, tackle, 5'9", 190 pounds
- Fred "Eggie" Eggeman, guard, 6', 195 pounds
- Oscar Hutzell, end, 5'9", 160 pounds
- Harry Miller, halfback, 5'10", 175 pounds
- Frank Munson, guard, 5'10-1/2", 185 pounds
- Clarence "Bud" Sheehan, center, 5'11", 190 pounds
- Rufus "Bumper" Waldorf, halfback, 6', 165 pounds

Second team

- Benjamin Berve, tackle, end, defensive halfback, 185 pounds
- Edwin Bonnan, quarterback, 5'6", 142 pounds
- Harry A. Burdick, defensive halfback and end, 185 pounds
- Thomas F. Donovan, 6'1", 185 pounds
- Nicholas M. Doyle, defensive line, 6', 190 pounds
- John F. Duffey, halfback, 5'11", 180 pounds
- Harry G. Hague, 5'9", 180 pounds
- Arthur A. Henning, 5'8", 180 pounds
- Max "Germany" Jurashek, halfback and end, 160 pounds
- Leroy Keach, end, guard, and backfield, 150 pounds
- James Keefe, quarterback and halfback, 5'10", 155 pounds
- Albert T. Mertes, 5'11", 185 pounds
- Edward O'Flynn, fullback, 5'10", 170 pounds
- Raymond J. Scanlon, offensive end, defensive halfback, 5'8", 160 pounds

=== Coaching staff ===
- Head coach: Thomas A. Barry
- Manager: Bill Draper
