= 1906 Iowa State Cyclones football team =

American college football season

1906 Iowa State Cyclones football
- Conference: Independent
- Record: 9–1
- Head coach: A. W. Ristine (5th season)
- Captain: R. E. Jeanson
- Home stadium: State Field

1906 Midwestern college football independents records
	Conf.			Overall
Team	W	L	T	W		L		T
Saint Louis		–		11	–	0	–	0
North Dakota Agricultural		–		5	–	0	–	0
Butler		–		1	–	0	–	0
Michigan State Normal		–		5	–	0	–	1
Iowa State		–		9	–	1	–	0
Ohio		–		7	–	1	–	0
Notre Dame		–		6	–	1	–	0
St. Mary's (OH)		–		5	–	1	–	0
Fairmount		–		7	–	1	–	2
Wabash		–		5	–	1	–	1
South Dakota State		–		3	–	1	–	0
Kansas		–		7	–	2	–	2
Kansas State		–		5	–	2	–	0
Missouri		–		5	–	2	–	1
Detroit College		–		4	–	2	–	1
Northern Illinois State		–		4	–	2	–	1
Carthage		–		3	–	2	–	0
Lake Forest		–		3	–	2	–	0
Nebraska		–		6	–	4	–	0
Wittenberg		–		5	–	4	–	1
Heidelberg		–		3	–	3	–	1
Washington University		–		2	–	2	–	2
Beloit		–		3	–	4	–	1
Franklin		–		3	–	4	–	0
Doane		–		2	–	3	–	0
Shurtleff		–		2	–	4	–	2
Western State Normal		–		1	–	2	–	0
Mount Union		–		2	–	5	–	1
Drake		–		2	–	5	–	0
Haskell		–		2	–	5	–	0
Marquette		–		1	–	4	–	2
Chicago P&S		–		0	–	1	–	1
Cincinnati		–		0	–	7	–	2
Western Illinois		–		0	–	3	–	0

The 1906 Iowa State Cyclones football team represented Iowa State College of Agricultural and Mechanic Arts (later renamed Iowa State University) as an independent during the 1906 college football season. In their fifth and final season under head coach A. W. Ristine, the Cyclones compiled a 9–1 record, shut out seven of ten opponents, and outscored all opponents by a combined total of 268 to 30. The Cyclones won their first four games by a combined score of 194 to 0, and their only loss was to Minnesota by a 22-4 score. R. E. Jeanson was the team captain.

Between 1892 and 1913, the football team played on a field that later became the site of the university's Parks Library. The field was known as State Field; when the new field opened in 1914, it became known as "New State Field".

== Schedule ==
Date	Time	Opponent	Site	Result	Source
September 29		Cornell (IA)	State Field; Ames, IA	W 81–0	
October 5	3:15 pm	Coe	State Field; Ames, IA	W 36–0	
October 6	3:15 pm	Des Moines	State Field; Ames, IA	W 45–0	
October 13		Morningside	State Field; Ames, IA	W 32–0	
October 20	3:30 pm	at Nebraska	Antelope Field; Lincoln, NE (rivalry)	W 14–2	
October 27		at Minnesota	Northrop Field; Minneapolis, MN	L 4–22	
November 3		South Dakota	State Field; Ames, IA	W 22–0	
November 17		Grinnell	State Field; Ames, IA	W 25–6	
November 24	3:30 pm	at Iowa	Iowa Field; Iowa City, IA (rivalry)	W 2–0	
November 29	2:30 pm	at Drake	Haskins Field; Des Moines, IA	W 7–0	
All times are in Central time
