= Cartier Field =

Stadium in Notre Dame, Indiana, U.S.

Cartier Athletic Field
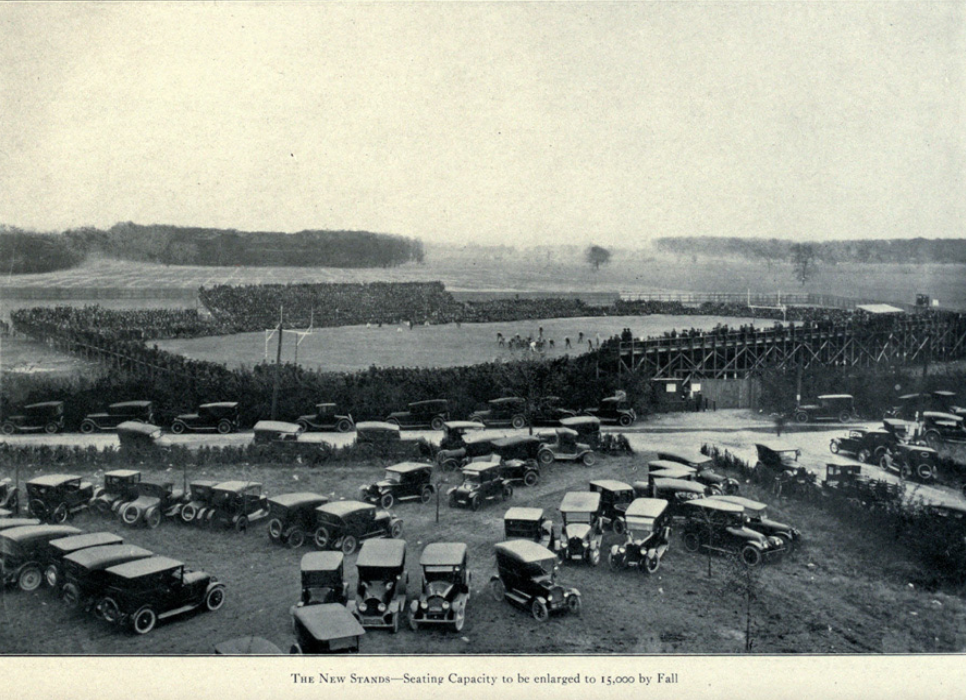
- Aerial view of Cartier Field in 1920.

- Location in Indiana Location in the United States
- Location: Notre Dame, Indiana United States
- Coordinates: 41.698°N 86.234°W
- Owner: University of Notre Dame
- Operator: University of Notre Dame
- Capacity: 500? (creation); 14,000 (1920); 15,000 (1921) <30,000 (peak)
- Surface: Natural grass

Construction
- Groundbreaking: June, 1899
- Opened: May 11, 1900; 126 years ago

Cartier Field was a stadium in Notre Dame, Indiana, first dedicated on May 11, 1900, as an arena for football, baseball, track and field, and bicycling. It hosted the University of Notre Dame Fighting Irish football team from 1900 to 1928 and held nearly 30,000 people at its peak. The stands were torn down after the 1928 season to make room for Notre Dame Stadium, which opened in 1930. Notre Dame played its entire 1929 schedule away from campus ("home" games were at Chicago's Soldier Field), went undefeated (9–0) and won the National Championship. At Coach Knute Rockne's insistence, Cartier Field's grass was transplanted into Notre Dame Stadium.

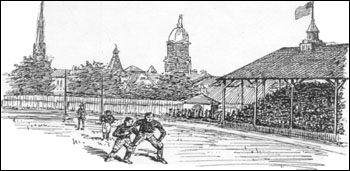
An early sketch of Cartier Field, as seen in the October 14, 1899 edition of the Notre Dame Scholastic.

For more than 30 years after the football team moved out, Cartier Field remained the home of Notre Dame's baseball and track and field teams. In 1962, the original Cartier Field was replaced by a quadrangle adjoining the Memorial Library, which opened in 1963, and a new facility named Cartier Field was opened east of Notre Dame Stadium. Since 2008, the Notre Dame Fighting Irish football team has held outdoor practices at the LaBar Football Practice Fields and indoor practices at Meyo Field in the Loftus Center until 2019. Since 2019, the team has moved indoor practices to the newly constructed Irish Athletic Center.

It was named after Warren Antoine Cartier, an 1887 civil engineering graduate and former member of the football team who purchased 10 acres (4.0 ha) and donated it to the university for establishment of the field. He also paid for furnishing the lumber required to enclose the field with fencing and construct a grandstand.

The Irish entertained many notable people on the athletic field by allowing them kicking drills or other activities. Babe Ruth visited the field in 1926, and Jack Dempsey underwent kicking drills in 1936.

The Fighting Irish would officially amass a 117–2–6 record at Cartier Field (with an additional three to five wins and one loss coming in the 1899 season before the field was dedicated) with their two losses coming against Wabash in 1905, and Carnegie Tech in 1928, which happened to be the last match football game played on the field. During this 29-year stretch, the Irish also recorded some of the longest home winning streaks in the history of college football, with 40 consecutive wins from 1907 to 1918, and 38 consecutive wins from 1919 to 1927 (if not for a tie against Great Lakes Navy in 1918, the streak would have been 79 consecutive contests). In terms of unbeaten streaks, the Irish were undefeated at home for 23 years and 93 contests, from 1905 to 1928.

== List of games ==
Date	Opponent	Site	Result	Attendance	Source
September 27, 1899	Englewood High School		W 29–5	600+	
October 23, 1899	Indiana		W 17–0	800+	
November 4, 1899	Rush Medical		W 17–0		
November 30, 1899	Chicago Physicians and Surgeons		L 0–5	2,000	
September 29, 1900	Goshen (High School)		W 55–0		
October 6, 1900	Englewood High School		W 68–0		
October 13, 1900	South Bend Howard Park Club		W 64–0		
October 26, 1900	Cincinnati		W 57–0		
November 3, 1900	Beloit		T 6–6		
November 24, 1900	Rush Medical		W 5–0		
November 29, 1900	Chicago Physicians and Surgeons		W 5–0		
September 28, 1901	South Bend Athletic Association		T 0–0		
October 19, 1901	Chicago Eclectic Medical		W 32–0		
November 2, 1901	Lake Forest		W 16–0		
November 9, 1901	Purdue		W 12–6		
November 16, 1901	Indiana		W 18–5		
November 23, 1901	Chicago Physicians & Surgeons		W 34–0		
September 27, 1902	Michigan Agricultural		W 33–0		
October 11, 1902	Lake Forest		W 28–0		
November 15, 1902	American Medical		W 92–0		
November 22, 1902	at DePauw		W 22–0		
October 3, 1903	Michigan Agricultural		W 12–0		
October 10, 1903	Lake Forest		W 28–0		
October 24, 1903	American Medical		W 52–0		
October 29, 1903	Chicago Physicians & Surgeons		W 46–0		
November 7, 1903	Kirksville Osteopath		W 28–0		
October 1, 1904	Wabash		W 12–4		
October 8, 1904	American Medical		W 44–0		
October 27, 1904	Toledo Athletic Association		W 6–0		
November 19, 1904	DePauw		W 10–0		
September 30, 1905	North Division High School		W 44–0		
October 7, 1905	Michigan Agricultural		W 28–0		
October 21, 1905	Wabash		L 0–5		
October 28, 1905	American Medical		W 142–0		
November 4, 1905	DePauw		W 71–0		
November 18, 1905	Bennett Medical		W 22–0		
October 6, 1906	Franklin		W 26–0		
October 13, 1906	Hillsdale		W 17–0		
October 20, 1906	Chicago Physicians and Surgeons		W 28–0		
October 27, 1906	Michigan Agricultural		W 5–0		
November 24, 1906	Beloit		W 29–0		
October 12, 1907	Chicago Physicians and Surgeons		W 32–0		
October 19, 1907	Franklin		W 23–0		
October 26, 1907	Olivet		W 22–4		
November 2, 1907	Indiana		T 0–0		
November 9, 1907	Knox		W 22–4		
October 3, 1908	Hillsdale		W 39–0		
October 10, 1908	Franklin		W 64–0		
October 24, 1908	Chicago Physicians and Surgeons		W 88–0		
October 29, 1908	Ohio Northern		W 58–4		
November 18, 1908	St. Viator		W 46–0		
October 9, 1909	Olivet		W 58–0		
October 16, 1909	Rose Polytechnic		W 60–11		
October 23, 1909	Michigan Agricultural		W 17–0		
October 30, 1909	at Pittsburgh		W 6–0		
November 6, 1909	at Michigan		W 11–3		
November 13, 1909	Miami (OH)		W 46–0		
November 20, 1909	Wabash		W 38–0		
October 8, 1910	Olivet		W 48–0		
October 22, 1910	Buchtel		W 51–0		
November 19, 1910	Ohio Northern		W 47–0		
October 7, 1911	Ohio Northern		W 32–6		
October 14, 1911	St. Viator		W 43–0		
October 21, 1911	Butler		W 27–0		
October 28, 1911	Loyola (IL)		W 80–0		
November 11, 1911	St. Bonaventure		W 34–0		
October 5, 1912	St. Viator		W 116–7		
October 12, 1912	Adrian		W 74–7		
October 19, 1912	Morris Harvey		W 39–0		
October 26, 1912	Wabash		W 41–6		
October 4, 1913	Ohio Northern		W 87–0		
October 18, 1913	South Dakota		W 20–7		
October 25, 1913	Alma		W 62–0		
October 3, 1914	Alma		W 56–0		
October 10, 1914	Rose Polytechnic		W 103–0		
October 31, 1914	Haskell		W 21–7		
October 2, 1915	Alma		W 32–0		
October 9, 1915	Haskell		W 34–0		
October 30, 1915	South Dakota		W 6–0		
September 30, 1916	Case		W 48–0		
October 14, 1916	Haskell		W 25–0		
October 28, 1916	Wabash		W 60–0		
November 25, 1916	Alma		W 46–0		
October 6, 1917	Kalamazoo		W 55–0		
October 27, 1917	South Dakota		W 40–0		
November 17, 1917	Michigan Agricultural		W 23–0		
November 9, 1918	Great Lakes Navy		T 7–7		
October 4, 1919	Kalamazoo		W 14–0	5,000	
October 11, 1919	Mount Union		W 60–7	4,000	
October 25, 1919	Western State		W 53–0	2,500	
November 15, 1919	Michigan Agricultural		W 13–0	5,000	
October 2, 1920	Kalamazoo		W 39–0	5,000	
October 9, 1920	Western State		W 42–0	3,500	
October 23, 1920	Valparaiso		W 28–3	8,000	
November 6, 1920	Purdue		W 28–0	12,000	
September 24, 1921	Kalamazoo		W 56–0	8,000	
October 1, 1921	DePauw		W 57–10	8,000	
October 22, 1921	Nebraska		W 7–0	14,000	
November 12, 1921	Haskell		W 42–7	5,000	
November 24, 1921	Michigan Agricultural		W 48–0	15,000	
September 30, 1922	Kalamazoo		W 56–0	5,000	
October 7, 1922	Saint Louis		W 26–0	7,000	
October 21, 1922	DePauw		W 34–7	5,000	
November 4, 1922	Indiana		W 27–0	22,000	
September 29, 1923	Kalamazoo		W 74–0	10,000	
October 7, 1923	Lombard		W 14–0	8,000	
October 27, 1923	at Georgia Tech		W 35–7	20,000	
November 3, 1923	Purdue		W 34–7	20,000	
November 17, 1923	Butler		W 34–7	10,000	
October 4, 1924	Lombard		W 40–0	8,000	
October 11, 1924	Wabash		W 34–0	10,000	
November 1, 1924	Georgia Tech		W 34–3	22,000	
November 15, 1924	Nebraska		W 34–6	22,000	
September 26, 1925	Baylor		W 41–0	13,000	
October 3, 1925	Lombard		W 69–0	10,000	
October 10, 1925	Beloit		W 19–3	> 6,000	
November 14, 1925	Carnegie Tech		W 26–0	26,000	
November 21, 1925	Northwestern		W 13–10	32,000	
October 2, 1926	Beloit		W 77–0	8,000	
October 16, 1926	Penn State		W 28–0	18,000	
October 30, 1926	Georgia Tech		W 12–0	11,000	
November 6, 1926	Indiana		W 26–0	20,000	
November 20, 1926	Drake		W 21–0	20,000	
October 1, 1927	Coe		W 28–7	10,000	
October 29, 1927	Georgia Tech		W 26–7	17,000	
November 5, 1927	Minnesota		T 7–7	25,000	
September 29, 1928	Loyola (LA)		W 12–6	15,000	
October 27, 1928	Drake		W 32–6	12,000	
November 17, 1928	Carnegie Tech		L 7–27	27,000	
