= 1906 Haskell Indians football team =

American college football season

1906 Haskell Indians football
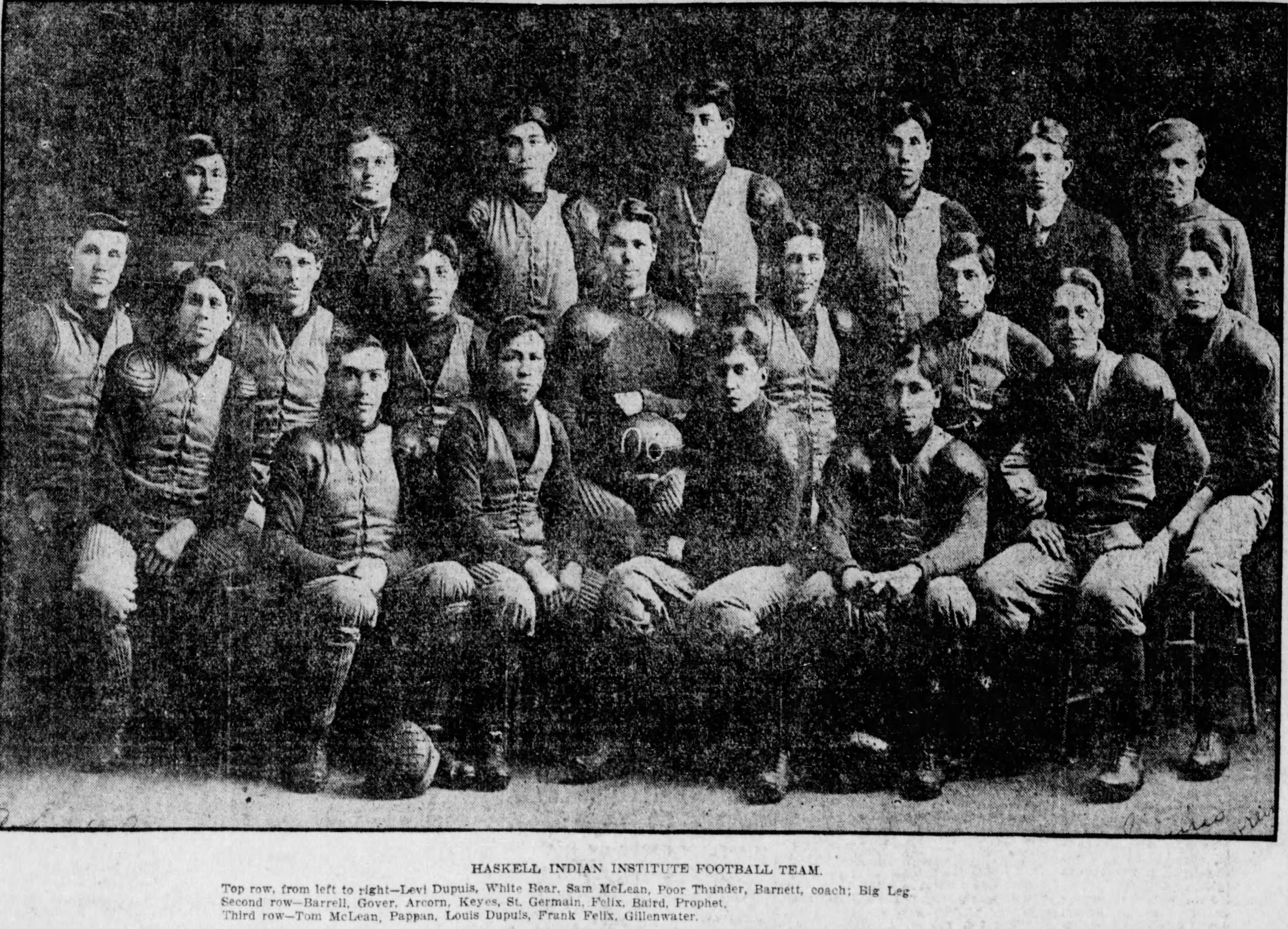
- Conference: Independent
- Record: 2–5
- Head coach: John H. Outland (2nd season)

1906 Midwestern college football independents records
	Conf.			Overall
Team	W	L	T	W		L		T
Saint Louis		–		11	–	0	–	0
North Dakota Agricultural		–		5	–	0	–	0
Butler		–		1	–	0	–	0
Michigan State Normal		–		5	–	0	–	1
Iowa State		–		9	–	1	–	0
Ohio		–		7	–	1	–	0
Notre Dame		–		6	–	1	–	0
St. Mary's (OH)		–		5	–	1	–	0
Fairmount		–		7	–	1	–	2
Wabash		–		5	–	1	–	1
South Dakota State		–		3	–	1	–	0
Kansas		–		7	–	2	–	2
Kansas State		–		5	–	2	–	0
Missouri		–		5	–	2	–	1
Detroit College		–		4	–	2	–	1
Northern Illinois State		–		4	–	2	–	1
Carthage		–		3	–	2	–	0
Lake Forest		–		3	–	2	–	0
Nebraska		–		6	–	4	–	0
Wittenberg		–		5	–	4	–	1
Heidelberg		–		3	–	3	–	1
Washington University		–		2	–	2	–	2
Beloit		–		3	–	4	–	1
Franklin		–		3	–	4	–	0
Doane		–		2	–	3	–	0
Shurtleff		–		2	–	4	–	2
Western State Normal		–		1	–	2	–	0
Mount Union		–		2	–	5	–	1
Drake		–		2	–	5	–	0
Haskell		–		2	–	5	–	0
Marquette		–		1	–	4	–	2
Chicago P&S		–		0	–	1	–	1
Cincinnati		–		0	–	7	–	2
Western Illinois		–		0	–	3	–	0

The 1906 Haskell Indians football team was an American football team that represented the Haskell Indian Institute (now known as Haskell Indian Nations University) as an independent during the 1906 college football season. In its second and final season under head coach John H. Outland, Haskell compiled a 2–5 record and was outscored by a total of 96 to 53. Coach Outland was later inducted into the College Football Hall of Fame and is the namesake of the Outland Trophy.

== Schedule ==
Date	Opponent	Site	Result	Source
October 6	Kansas City Medics	Lawrence, KS	W 28–0	
October 13	at Kansas State	Manhattan, KS	L 5–10	
October 27	Kansas City Veterinary	Lawrence, KS	W 10–4	
November 3	at Drake	Haskins Field; Des Moines, IA	L 0–10	
November 9	at Texas	Clark Field; Austin, TX	L 0–28	
November 12	at Texas A&M	College Station, TX	L 6–32	
November 15	at Fairmount	Fairmount Athletic Field; Wichita, KS	L 4–12 (forfeit)	
