= 1906 Cincinnati football team =

American college football season

1906 Cincinnati football
- Conference: Independent
- Record: 0–7–2
- Head coach: William Foley (1st season)
- Captain: Edward Adams
- Home stadium: Burnet Woods, League Park

1906 Midwestern college football independents records
	Conf.			Overall
Team	W	L	T	W		L		T
Saint Louis		–		11	–	0	–	0
North Dakota Agricultural		–		5	–	0	–	0
Butler		–		1	–	0	–	0
Michigan State Normal		–		5	–	0	–	1
Iowa State		–		9	–	1	–	0
Ohio		–		7	–	1	–	0
Notre Dame		–		6	–	1	–	0
St. Mary's (OH)		–		5	–	1	–	0
Fairmount		–		7	–	1	–	2
Wabash		–		5	–	1	–	1
South Dakota State		–		3	–	1	–	0
Kansas		–		7	–	2	–	2
Kansas State		–		5	–	2	–	0
Missouri		–		5	–	2	–	1
Detroit College		–		4	–	2	–	1
Northern Illinois State		–		4	–	2	–	1
Carthage		–		3	–	2	–	0
Lake Forest		–		3	–	2	–	0
Nebraska		–		6	–	4	–	0
Wittenberg		–		5	–	4	–	1
Heidelberg		–		3	–	3	–	1
Washington University		–		2	–	2	–	2
Beloit		–		3	–	4	–	1
Franklin		–		3	–	4	–	0
Doane		–		2	–	3	–	0
Shurtleff		–		2	–	4	–	2
Western State Normal		–		1	–	2	–	0
Mount Union		–		2	–	5	–	1
Drake		–		2	–	5	–	0
Haskell		–		2	–	5	–	0
Marquette		–		1	–	4	–	2
Chicago P&S		–		0	–	1	–	1
Cincinnati		–		0	–	7	–	2
Western Illinois		–		0	–	3	–	0

The 1906 Cincinnati football team was an American football team that represented the University of Cincinnati as an independent during the 1906 college football season. Led by William Foley in his first and only season as head coach, Cincinnati compiled a record of 0–7–2. Edward Adams was the team captain. The team played home games at Burnet Woods and League Park in Cincinnati.

== Schedule ==
Date	Time	Opponent	Site	Result	Attendance	Source
October 6	3:00 p.m.	Marshall	Burnet Woods; Cincinnati, OH	T 0–0		
October 13	3:15 p.m.	Miami (OH)	Burnet Woods; Cincinnati, OH (Victory Bell)	T 0–0		
October 20		at Earlham	Reid Field; Richmond, IN	L 0–20	800	
October 27		Avondale Athletic Club	Burnet Woods; Cincinnati, OH	L 0–4		
November 3	3:00 p.m.	Ohio	League Park; Cincinnati, OH	L 5–16		
November 10		Wittenberg	League Park; Cincinnati, OH	L 0–12	300	
November 17		at Marietta	Marietta, OH	L 0–51		
November 24	3:00 p.m.	Carlisle	League Park; Cincinnati, OH	L 0–18	5,000	
November 29	2:30 p.m.	at Nebraska	Antelope Field; Lincoln, NE	L 0–41	2,500	
