= 1906 Drake Bulldogs football team =

American college football season

1906 Drake Bulldogs football
- Conference: Independent
- Record: 2–4–1
- Head coach: Charles Pell (1st season)
- Home stadium: Haskins Field

1906 Midwestern college football independents records
	Conf.			Overall
Team	W	L	T	W		L		T
Saint Louis		–		11	–	0	–	0
North Dakota Agricultural		–		5	–	0	–	0
Butler		–		1	–	0	–	0
Michigan State Normal		–		5	–	0	–	1
Iowa State		–		9	–	1	–	0
Ohio		–		7	–	1	–	0
Notre Dame		–		6	–	1	–	0
St. Mary's (OH)		–		5	–	1	–	0
Fairmount		–		7	–	1	–	2
Wabash		–		5	–	1	–	1
South Dakota State		–		3	–	1	–	0
Kansas		–		7	–	2	–	2
Kansas State		–		5	–	2	–	0
Missouri		–		5	–	2	–	1
Detroit College		–		4	–	2	–	1
Northern Illinois State		–		4	–	2	–	1
Carthage		–		3	–	2	–	0
Lake Forest		–		3	–	2	–	0
Nebraska		–		6	–	4	–	0
Wittenberg		–		5	–	4	–	1
Heidelberg		–		3	–	3	–	1
Washington University		–		2	–	2	–	2
Beloit		–		3	–	4	–	1
Franklin		–		3	–	4	–	0
Doane		–		2	–	3	–	0
Shurtleff		–		2	–	4	–	2
Western State Normal		–		1	–	2	–	0
Mount Union		–		2	–	5	–	1
Drake		–		2	–	5	–	0
Haskell		–		2	–	5	–	0
Marquette		–		1	–	4	–	2
Chicago P&S		–		0	–	1	–	1
Cincinnati		–		0	–	7	–	2
Western Illinois		–		0	–	3	–	0

The 1906 Drake Bulldogs football team was an American football team that represented Drake University as an independent during the 1906 college football season. In their first season under head coach Charles Pell, the Bulldogs compiled a 2–4–1 record and were outscored by a total of 62 to 41. The team played its home games at Haskins Field in Des Moines, Iowa.

== Schedule ==
Date	Time	Opponent	Site	Result	Attendance	Source
October 13		at Nebraska	Antelope Field; Lincoln, NE	L 0–5		
October 20		Des Moines	Haskins Field; Des Moines, IA	W 14–6		
October 27		Grinnell	Haskins Field; Des Moines, IA	L 0–4		
November 3		Haskell	Haskins Field; Des Moines, IA	W 10–0		
November 10		at Morningside	Sioux City, IA	T 8–8	700	
November 17	2:30 p.m.	at Saint Louis	Sportsman's Park; St. Louis, MO	L 9–32		
November 29		Iowa State	Haskins Field; Des Moines, IA	L 0–7		
