= 1906 Kansas Jayhawks football team =

American college football season

1906 Kansas Jayhawks football
- Conference: Independent
- Record: 6-2–2
- Head coach: A. R. Kennedy (3rd season)
- Captain: Prentiss Donald
- Home stadium: McCook Field

1906 Midwestern college football independents records
	Conf.			Overall
Team	W	L	T	W		L		T
Saint Louis		–		11	–	0	–	0
North Dakota Agricultural		–		5	–	0	–	0
Butler		–		1	–	0	–	0
Michigan State Normal		–		5	–	0	–	1
Iowa State		–		9	–	1	–	0
Ohio		–		7	–	1	–	0
Notre Dame		–		6	–	1	–	0
St. Mary's (OH)		–		5	–	1	–	0
Fairmount		–		7	–	1	–	2
Wabash		–		5	–	1	–	1
South Dakota State		–		3	–	1	–	0
Kansas		–		7	–	2	–	2
Kansas State		–		5	–	2	–	0
Missouri		–		5	–	2	–	1
Detroit College		–		4	–	2	–	1
Northern Illinois State		–		4	–	2	–	1
Carthage		–		3	–	2	–	0
Lake Forest		–		3	–	2	–	0
Nebraska		–		6	–	4	–	0
Wittenberg		–		5	–	4	–	1
Heidelberg		–		3	–	3	–	1
Washington University		–		2	–	2	–	2
Beloit		–		3	–	4	–	1
Franklin		–		3	–	4	–	0
Doane		–		2	–	3	–	0
Shurtleff		–		2	–	4	–	2
Western State Normal		–		1	–	2	–	0
Mount Union		–		2	–	5	–	1
Drake		–		2	–	5	–	0
Haskell		–		2	–	5	–	0
Marquette		–		1	–	4	–	2
Chicago P&S		–		0	–	1	–	1
Cincinnati		–		0	–	7	–	2
Western Illinois		–		0	–	3	–	0

The 1906 Kansas Jayhawks football team was an American football team that represented the University of Kansas as an independent during the 1906 college football season. In their third season under head coach A. R. Kennedy, the Jayhawks compiled a 6-2–2 record and outscored opponents by a total of 148 to 55. The Jayhawks played home games at McCook Field in Lawrence, Kansas. Prentiss Donald was the team captain.

== Schedule ==
Date	Time	Opponent	Site	Result	Attendance	Source
September 22		William Jewell	McCook Field; Lawrence, KS	W 18–0		
October 3		College of Emporia	McCook Field; Lawrence, KS	W 25–0		
October 6		St. Mary's (KS)	McCook Field; Lawrence, KS	W 18–0		
October 13		Arkansas	McCook Field; Lawrence, KS	W 37–5		
October 20		Oklahoma	McCook Field; Lawrence, KS	W 20–4	2,000	
November 3		at Saint Louis	Sportsman's Park; St. Louis, MO	L 2–34		
November 10		at Washburn	Washburn Field; Topeka, KS	T 0–0		
November 17		at Nebraska	Antelope Field; Lincoln, NE (rivalry)	W 8–6		
November 23		at Kansas State	Manhattan, KS (rivalry)	L 4–6		
November 29	2:30 p.m.	vs. Missouri	Association Park; Kansas City, MO (rivalry)	T 0–0	3,500	
