= 1906 Western State Normal Hilltoppers football team =

American college football season

1906 Western State Normal Hilltoppers football
- Conference: Independent
- Record: 1–2
- Head coach: Tubby Meyers (1st season)
- Captain: Tubby Meyers

1906 Midwestern college football independents records
	Conf.			Overall
Team	W	L	T	W		L		T
Saint Louis		–		11	–	0	–	0
North Dakota Agricultural		–		5	–	0	–	0
Butler		–		1	–	0	–	0
Michigan State Normal		–		5	–	0	–	1
Iowa State		–		9	–	1	–	0
Ohio		–		7	–	1	–	0
Notre Dame		–		6	–	1	–	0
St. Mary's (OH)		–		5	–	1	–	0
Fairmount		–		7	–	1	–	2
Wabash		–		5	–	1	–	1
South Dakota State		–		3	–	1	–	0
Kansas		–		7	–	2	–	2
Kansas State		–		5	–	2	–	0
Missouri		–		5	–	2	–	1
Detroit College		–		4	–	2	–	1
Northern Illinois State		–		4	–	2	–	1
Carthage		–		3	–	2	–	0
Lake Forest		–		3	–	2	–	0
Nebraska		–		6	–	4	–	0
Wittenberg		–		5	–	4	–	1
Heidelberg		–		3	–	3	–	1
Washington University		–		2	–	2	–	2
Beloit		–		3	–	4	–	1
Franklin		–		3	–	4	–	0
Doane		–		2	–	3	–	0
Shurtleff		–		2	–	4	–	2
Western State Normal		–		1	–	2	–	0
Mount Union		–		2	–	5	–	1
Drake		–		2	–	5	–	0
Haskell		–		2	–	5	–	0
Marquette		–		1	–	4	–	2
Chicago P&S		–		0	–	1	–	1
Cincinnati		–		0	–	7	–	2
Western Illinois		–		0	–	3	–	0

The 1906 Western State Normal Hilltoppers football team represented Western State Normal School (later renamed Western Michigan University) as an independent during the 1906 college football season. In their first season under head coach Tubby Meyers, the Hilltoppers compiled a 1–2 record and were outscored by their opponents, 28 to 26. In addition to serving as the head coach, halfback Tubby Meyers was the team captain for the first of three consecutive years.

The team's first game was a 21–0 victory over Wayland High School from Wayland, Michigan, on October 13, 1906.

The school's first intercollegiate football game was a 14–0 loss to Kalamazoo College on November 3, 1906. Two weeks later, the team lost, 14–5, to Michigan State Normal.

On November 12, 1906, the team, the first for the school, was honored at an oyster dinner hosted by the manual training department with 15 women, all students from the domestic science department, as hostesses. Brown and gold pennants were presented to each guest, and a miniature brown and gold football was placed on every plate.

== Schedule ==
Date	Opponent	Site	Result	Source
October 13	Wayland High School		W 21–0	
November 3	Kalamazoo	Kalamazoo, MI	L 0–14	
November 17	Michigan State Normal	Kalamazoo, MI	L 5–14	
