= 1906 North Dakota Agricultural Aggies football team =

American college football season

1906 North Dakota Agricultural Aggies football
- Conference: Independent
- Record: 5–0
- Head coach: Gil Dobie (1st season)
- Captain: Fred Birch

1906 Midwestern college football independents records
	Conf.			Overall
Team	W	L	T	W		L		T
Saint Louis		–		11	–	0	–	0
North Dakota Agricultural		–		5	–	0	–	0
Butler		–		1	–	0	–	0
Michigan State Normal		–		5	–	0	–	1
Iowa State		–		9	–	1	–	0
Ohio		–		7	–	1	–	0
Notre Dame		–		6	–	1	–	0
St. Mary's (OH)		–		5	–	1	–	0
Fairmount		–		7	–	1	–	2
Wabash		–		5	–	1	–	1
South Dakota State		–		3	–	1	–	0
Kansas		–		7	–	2	–	2
Kansas State		–		5	–	2	–	0
Missouri		–		5	–	2	–	1
Detroit College		–		4	–	2	–	1
Northern Illinois State		–		4	–	2	–	1
Carthage		–		3	–	2	–	0
Lake Forest		–		3	–	2	–	0
Nebraska		–		6	–	4	–	0
Wittenberg		–		5	–	4	–	1
Heidelberg		–		3	–	3	–	1
Washington University		–		2	–	2	–	2
Beloit		–		3	–	4	–	1
Franklin		–		3	–	4	–	0
Doane		–		2	–	3	–	0
Shurtleff		–		2	–	4	–	2
Western State Normal		–		1	–	2	–	0
Mount Union		–		2	–	5	–	1
Drake		–		2	–	5	–	0
Haskell		–		2	–	5	–	0
Marquette		–		1	–	4	–	2
Chicago P&S		–		0	–	1	–	1
Cincinnati		–		0	–	7	–	2
Western Illinois		–		0	–	3	–	0

The 1906 North Dakota Agricultural Aggies football team was an American football team that represented North Dakota Agricultural College (now known as North Dakota State University) as an independent during the 1906 college football season. In its first season under head coach Gil Dobie, the team compiled a 5–0 record and outscored opponents by a total of 236 to 4.

The season was part of a 10-game winning streak that began in 1905 and ended in 1908.

== Schedule ==
Date	Opponent	Site	Result
October 20	at Carleton	Northfield, MN	W 23–0
October 27	North Dakota	Fargo, ND (rivalry)	W 32–4
November 3	Yankton	Fargo, ND	W 61–0
November 10	at Hamline	St. Paul, MN	W 51–0
	Mayville Normal		W 69–0
