= 1906 Missouri Tigers football team =

American college football season

1906 Missouri Tigers football
- Conference: Independent
- Record: 5–2–1
- Head coach: W. J. Monilaw (1st season)
- Captain: B. W. Tilman
- Home stadium: Rollins Field

1906 Midwestern college football independents records
	Conf.			Overall
Team	W	L	T	W		L		T
Saint Louis		–		11	–	0	–	0
North Dakota Agricultural		–		5	–	0	–	0
Butler		–		1	–	0	–	0
Michigan State Normal		–		5	–	0	–	1
Iowa State		–		9	–	1	–	0
Ohio		–		7	–	1	–	0
Notre Dame		–		6	–	1	–	0
St. Mary's (OH)		–		5	–	1	–	0
Fairmount		–		7	–	1	–	2
Wabash		–		5	–	1	–	1
South Dakota State		–		3	–	1	–	0
Kansas		–		7	–	2	–	2
Kansas State		–		5	–	2	–	0
Missouri		–		5	–	2	–	1
Detroit College		–		4	–	2	–	1
Northern Illinois State		–		4	–	2	–	1
Carthage		–		3	–	2	–	0
Lake Forest		–		3	–	2	–	0
Nebraska		–		6	–	4	–	0
Wittenberg		–		5	–	4	–	1
Heidelberg		–		3	–	3	–	1
Washington University		–		2	–	2	–	2
Beloit		–		3	–	4	–	1
Franklin		–		3	–	4	–	0
Doane		–		2	–	3	–	0
Shurtleff		–		2	–	4	–	2
Western State Normal		–		1	–	2	–	0
Mount Union		–		2	–	5	–	1
Drake		–		2	–	5	–	0
Haskell		–		2	–	5	–	0
Marquette		–		1	–	4	–	2
Chicago P&S		–		0	–	1	–	1
Cincinnati		–		0	–	7	–	2
Western Illinois		–		0	–	3	–	0

The 1906 Missouri Tigers football team was an American football team that represented the University of Missouri as an independent during the 1906 college football season. The team compiled a 5–2–1 record and outscored its opponents by a combined total of 94 to 79. W. J. Monilaw was the head coach for the first of three seasons. The team played its home games at Rollins Field in Columbia, Missouri.

== Schedule ==
Date	Time	Opponent	Site	Result	Attendance	Source
October 2		Kirksville Normal	Rollins Field; Columbia, MO	W 23–4		
October 6		Warrensburg Teachers	Rollins Field; Columbia, MO	W 41–2		
October 13		Missouri Mines	Rollins Field; Columbia, MO	W 26–0		
October 20		Drury	Rollins Field; Columbia, MO	W 11–0		
October 27		at Iowa	Iowa Field; Iowa City, IA	L 4–26		
November 10		Arkansas	Rollins Field; Columbia, MO (rivalry)	W 11–0		
November 17	2:30 p.m.	at Washington University	League Park; St. Louis, MO	L 0–12		
November 29	2:30 p.m.	vs. Kansas	Association Park; Kansas City, MO (rivalry)	T 0–0	3,500	
