= 1906 Saint Louis Blue and White football team =

American college football season

1906 Saint Louis Blue and White football
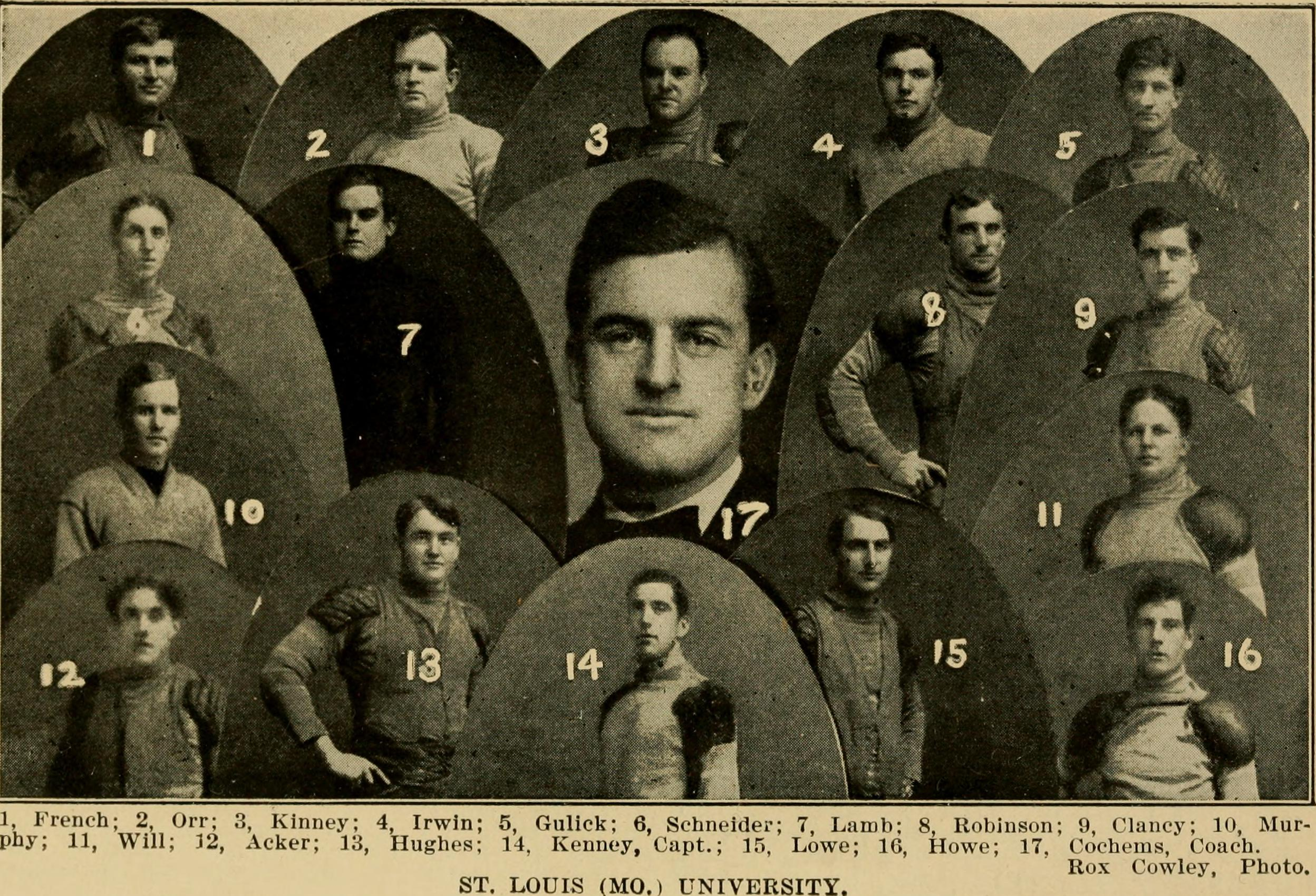
- Conference: Independent
- Record: 11–0
- Head coach: Eddie Cochems (1st season)
- Captain: Clarence Kenney
- Home stadium: Handlan's Park, Sportsman's Park

1906 Midwestern college football independents records
	Conf.			Overall
Team	W	L	T	W		L		T
Saint Louis		–		11	–	0	–	0
North Dakota Agricultural		–		5	–	0	–	0
Butler		–		1	–	0	–	0
Michigan State Normal		–		5	–	0	–	1
Iowa State		–		9	–	1	–	0
Ohio		–		7	–	1	–	0
Notre Dame		–		6	–	1	–	0
St. Mary's (OH)		–		5	–	1	–	0
Fairmount		–		7	–	1	–	2
Wabash		–		5	–	1	–	1
South Dakota State		–		3	–	1	–	0
Kansas		–		7	–	2	–	2
Kansas State		–		5	–	2	–	0
Missouri		–		5	–	2	–	1
Detroit College		–		4	–	2	–	1
Northern Illinois State		–		4	–	2	–	1
Carthage		–		3	–	2	–	0
Lake Forest		–		3	–	2	–	0
Nebraska		–		6	–	4	–	0
Wittenberg		–		5	–	4	–	1
Heidelberg		–		3	–	3	–	1
Washington University		–		2	–	2	–	2
Beloit		–		3	–	4	–	1
Franklin		–		3	–	4	–	0
Doane		–		2	–	3	–	0
Shurtleff		–		2	–	4	–	2
Western State Normal		–		1	–	2	–	0
Mount Union		–		2	–	5	–	1
Drake		–		2	–	5	–	0
Haskell		–		2	–	5	–	0
Marquette		–		1	–	4	–	2
Chicago P&S		–		0	–	1	–	1
Cincinnati		–		0	–	7	–	2
Western Illinois		–		0	–	3	–	0

The 1906 Saint Louis Blue and White football team was an American football team that represented Saint Louis University as an independent during the 1906 college football season. In its first season under head coach Eddie Cochems, the team compiled a perfect 11–0 record and outscored opponents by a total of 407 to 11.

The forward pass became legal in 1906, and Saint Louis is credited by some with having thrown the first legal forward pass in a September 5, 1906, game against Carroll College. Football authority and College Football Hall of Fame coach David M. Nelson wrote that "E. B. Cochems is to forward passing what the Wright brothers are to aviation and Thomas Edison is to the electric light." Halfback Bradbury Robinson led the team's early passing attack.

== Schedule ==
Date	Time	Opponent	Site	Result	Attendance	Source
September 26		at Carroll (WI)	Waukesha, WI	W 22–0		
September 29		at Lawrence	Appleton, WI	W 6–0		
October 4		at St. John's Military Academy	Delafield, WI	W 27–0		
October 6		at Marquette	Milwaukee, WI	W 30–0		
October 13		St. Charles Military Academy	Handlan's Park; St. Louis, MO	W 33–0		
October 20		Cape Girardeau Normal	Sportsman's Park; St. Louis, MO	W 59–0		
October 27	3:00 p.m.	Missouri Mines	Sportsman's Park; St. Louis, MO	W 71–0		
November 3		Kansas	Sportsman's Park; St. Louis, MO	W 34–2		
November 10		Kansas City Medics	Sportsman's Park; St. Louis, MO	W 54–0		
November 17	2:30 p.m.	Drake	Sportsman's Park; St. Louis, MO	W 32–9		
November 29		Iowa	Sportsman's Park; St. Louis, MO	W 39–0	13,000	
