= 1906 Beloit football team =

American college football season

1906 Beloit football
- Conference: Independent
- Record: 3–4–1
- Head coach: Charles A. Fairweather (1st season)

1906 Midwestern college football independents records
	Conf.			Overall
Team	W	L	T	W		L		T
Saint Louis		–		11	–	0	–	0
North Dakota Agricultural		–		5	–	0	–	0
Butler		–		1	–	0	–	0
Michigan State Normal		–		5	–	0	–	1
Iowa State		–		9	–	1	–	0
Ohio		–		7	–	1	–	0
Notre Dame		–		6	–	1	–	0
St. Mary's (OH)		–		5	–	1	–	0
Fairmount		–		7	–	1	–	2
Wabash		–		5	–	1	–	1
South Dakota State		–		3	–	1	–	0
Kansas		–		7	–	2	–	2
Kansas State		–		5	–	2	–	0
Missouri		–		5	–	2	–	1
Detroit College		–		4	–	2	–	1
Northern Illinois State		–		4	–	2	–	1
Carthage		–		3	–	2	–	0
Lake Forest		–		3	–	2	–	0
Nebraska		–		6	–	4	–	0
Wittenberg		–		5	–	4	–	1
Heidelberg		–		3	–	3	–	1
Washington University		–		2	–	2	–	2
Beloit		–		3	–	4	–	1
Franklin		–		3	–	4	–	0
Doane		–		2	–	3	–	0
Shurtleff		–		2	–	4	–	2
Western State Normal		–		1	–	2	–	0
Mount Union		–		2	–	5	–	1
Drake		–		2	–	5	–	0
Haskell		–		2	–	5	–	0
Marquette		–		1	–	4	–	2
Chicago P&S		–		0	–	1	–	1
Cincinnati		–		0	–	7	–	2
Western Illinois		–		0	–	3	–	0

The 1906 Beloit football team represented Beloit College in the 1906 college football season. In Charles A. Fairweather's first season, Beloit compiled a 3–4–1 record, and defeated Lake Forest, Northern Illinois, and Milwaukee Medical College.

== Schedule ==
Date	Opponent	Site	Result	Source
September 29	Rockford High School (IL)		T 0–0	
October 6	Northern Illinois State Noraml	Beloit, WI	W 12–0	
October 20	at Ripon	Ripon, WI	L 0–4	
October 27	Lawrence	Beloit, WI	L 5–10	
November 3	Milwaukee Medical	Beloit, WI	W 22–6	
November 10	Lake Forest	Beloit, WI	W 11–0	
November 17	Notre Dame	Cartier Field; Notre Dame, IN	L 0–29	
November 24	at Monmouth (IL)	Monmouth, IL	L 0–11	
