= 1906 Franklin Baptists football team =

American college football season

1906 Franklin Baptists football
- Conference: Independent
- Record: 3–4
- Captain: Liedorf (right halfback)

1906 Midwestern college football independents records
	Conf.			Overall
Team	W	L	T	W		L		T
Saint Louis		–		11	–	0	–	0
North Dakota Agricultural		–		5	–	0	–	0
Butler		–		1	–	0	–	0
Michigan State Normal		–		5	–	0	–	1
Iowa State		–		9	–	1	–	0
Ohio		–		7	–	1	–	0
Notre Dame		–		6	–	1	–	0
St. Mary's (OH)		–		5	–	1	–	0
Fairmount		–		7	–	1	–	2
Wabash		–		5	–	1	–	1
South Dakota State		–		3	–	1	–	0
Kansas		–		7	–	2	–	2
Kansas State		–		5	–	2	–	0
Missouri		–		5	–	2	–	1
Detroit College		–		4	–	2	–	1
Northern Illinois State		–		4	–	2	–	1
Carthage		–		3	–	2	–	0
Lake Forest		–		3	–	2	–	0
Nebraska		–		6	–	4	–	0
Wittenberg		–		5	–	4	–	1
Heidelberg		–		3	–	3	–	1
Washington University		–		2	–	2	–	2
Beloit		–		3	–	4	–	1
Franklin		–		3	–	4	–	0
Doane		–		2	–	3	–	0
Shurtleff		–		2	–	4	–	2
Western State Normal		–		1	–	2	–	0
Mount Union		–		2	–	5	–	1
Drake		–		2	–	5	–	0
Haskell		–		2	–	5	–	0
Marquette		–		1	–	4	–	2
Chicago P&S		–		0	–	1	–	1
Cincinnati		–		0	–	7	–	2
Western Illinois		–		0	–	3	–	0

The 1906 Franklin football team represented Franklin College of Indiana in the 1906 college football season.

== Schedule ==
Date	Opponent	Site	Result	Source
October 6	at Notre Dame	Cartier Field; Notre Dame, IN	L 0–26	
October 13	at DePauw	Greencastle, IN	L 6–81	
October 20	Miami (OH)		Cancelled	
October 20	Shelbyville High School	Franklin, IN	W 17–6	
October 21	at Muskingum	New Concord, OH	L 0–37	
October 25	Greenwood Athletic Club	Franklin, IN	Unknown	
November 3	at Earlham	Richmond, IN	L 0–45	
November 9	Hanover	Franklin, IN	W 6–0 (forfeit)	
November 14	Indiana State Normal	Franklin, IN	W 23–0	
November 17	at Rose Polytechnic	Terre Haute, IN	Cancelled	
