= 1906 Washington University football team =

American college football season

1906 Washington University football
- Conference: Independent
- Record: 2–2–2
- Head coach: J. Merrill Blanchard (1st season)
- Captain: Frank S. Lucky
- Home stadium: Washington University Stadium, League Park

1906 Midwestern college football independents records
	Conf.			Overall
Team	W	L	T	W		L		T
Saint Louis		–		11	–	0	–	0
North Dakota Agricultural		–		5	–	0	–	0
Butler		–		1	–	0	–	0
Michigan State Normal		–		5	–	0	–	1
Iowa State		–		9	–	1	–	0
Ohio		–		7	–	1	–	0
Notre Dame		–		6	–	1	–	0
St. Mary's (OH)		–		5	–	1	–	0
Fairmount		–		7	–	1	–	2
Wabash		–		5	–	1	–	1
South Dakota State		–		3	–	1	–	0
Kansas		–		7	–	2	–	2
Kansas State		–		5	–	2	–	0
Missouri		–		5	–	2	–	1
Detroit College		–		4	–	2	–	1
Northern Illinois State		–		4	–	2	–	1
Carthage		–		3	–	2	–	0
Lake Forest		–		3	–	2	–	0
Nebraska		–		6	–	4	–	0
Wittenberg		–		5	–	4	–	1
Heidelberg		–		3	–	3	–	1
Washington University		–		2	–	2	–	2
Beloit		–		3	–	4	–	1
Franklin		–		3	–	4	–	0
Doane		–		2	–	3	–	0
Shurtleff		–		2	–	4	–	2
Western State Normal		–		1	–	2	–	0
Mount Union		–		2	–	5	–	1
Drake		–		2	–	5	–	0
Haskell		–		2	–	5	–	0
Marquette		–		1	–	4	–	2
Chicago P&S		–		0	–	1	–	1
Cincinnati		–		0	–	7	–	2
Western Illinois		–		0	–	3	–	0

The 1906 Washington University football team represented Washington University in St. Louis as an independent during the 1906 college football season. Led by first-year head coach J. Merrill Blanchard, the team compiled a record of 2–2–2. Frank S. Lucky was elected team captain.

== Schedule ==
Date	Time	Opponent	Site	Result	Source
October 6	3:00 p.m.	Shurtleff	Washington University Stadium; St. Louis, MO	L 0–16	
October 27		at Cape Girardeau Normal	Cape Girardeau, MO	T 0–0	
November 3		Shurtleff	Washington University Stadium; St. Louis, MO	T 12–12	
November 10	2:30 p.m.	Central (MO)	Washington University Stadium; St. Louis, MO	W 12–4	
November 17	2:30 p.m.	Missouri	League Park; St. Louis, MO	W 12–0	
November 23		at Texas	Clark Field; Austin, TX	L 6–17	
