= 1906 Fairmount Wheatshockers football team =

American college football season

1906 Fairmount Wheatshockers football
- Conference: Independent
- Record: 7–1–2
- Head coach: Willis Bates (2nd season)

1906 Midwestern college football independents records
	Conf.			Overall
Team	W	L	T	W		L		T
Saint Louis		–		11	–	0	–	0
North Dakota Agricultural		–		5	–	0	–	0
Butler		–		1	–	0	–	0
Michigan State Normal		–		5	–	0	–	1
Iowa State		–		9	–	1	–	0
Ohio		–		7	–	1	–	0
Notre Dame		–		6	–	1	–	0
St. Mary's (OH)		–		5	–	1	–	0
Fairmount		–		7	–	1	–	2
Wabash		–		5	–	1	–	1
South Dakota State		–		3	–	1	–	0
Kansas		–		7	–	2	–	2
Kansas State		–		5	–	2	–	0
Missouri		–		5	–	2	–	1
Detroit College		–		4	–	2	–	1
Northern Illinois State		–		4	–	2	–	1
Carthage		–		3	–	2	–	0
Lake Forest		–		3	–	2	–	0
Nebraska		–		6	–	4	–	0
Wittenberg		–		5	–	4	–	1
Heidelberg		–		3	–	3	–	1
Washington University		–		2	–	2	–	2
Beloit		–		3	–	4	–	1
Franklin		–		3	–	4	–	0
Doane		–		2	–	3	–	0
Shurtleff		–		2	–	4	–	2
Western State Normal		–		1	–	2	–	0
Mount Union		–		2	–	5	–	1
Drake		–		2	–	5	–	0
Haskell		–		2	–	5	–	0
Marquette		–		1	–	4	–	2
Chicago P&S		–		0	–	1	–	1
Cincinnati		–		0	–	7	–	2
Western Illinois		–		0	–	3	–	0

The 1906 Fairmount Wheatshockers football team was an American football team that represented Fairmount College (now known as Wichita State University) as an independent during the 1906 college football season. In its second season under head coach Willis Bates, the team compiled a 7–1–2 record.

== Schedule ==
Date	Time	Opponent	Site	Result	Source
October 2		Chilocco	Fairmount Athletic Field; Wichita, KS	T 0–0	
October 11		Alva Normal	Wichita, KS	W 16–0	
October 16		Kansas Wesleyan	Wichita Fairgrounds; Wichita, KS	W 40–0	
October 20		Kansas State Normal	Emporia, KS	W 6–4	
October 22		St. Mary's (KS)	St. Marys, KS	L 0–6	
		Friends		T 0–0	
November 3		at Washburn	Topeka, KS	W 7–6	
November 5		at Kansas State	Manhattan, KS	W 12–6	
November 12	2:30 p.m.	Southwestern (KS)	Fairmount Athletic Field; Wichita, KS	W 18–6	
November 15		Haskell	Fairmount Athletic Field; Wichita, KS	W 12–4 (forfeit)	
