= 1906 Shurtleff football team =

American college football season

1906 Shurtleff football
- Conference: Independent
- Record: 2–4–2
- Head coach: Philip Arbuckle (1st season)
- Home stadium: Western Military Academy grounds

1906 Midwestern college football independents records
	Conf.			Overall
Team	W	L	T	W		L		T
Saint Louis		–		11	–	0	–	0
North Dakota Agricultural		–		5	–	0	–	0
Butler		–		1	–	0	–	0
Michigan State Normal		–		5	–	0	–	1
Iowa State		–		9	–	1	–	0
Ohio		–		7	–	1	–	0
Notre Dame		–		6	–	1	–	0
St. Mary's (OH)		–		5	–	1	–	0
Fairmount		–		7	–	1	–	2
Wabash		–		5	–	1	–	1
South Dakota State		–		3	–	1	–	0
Kansas		–		7	–	2	–	2
Kansas State		–		5	–	2	–	0
Missouri		–		5	–	2	–	1
Detroit College		–		4	–	2	–	1
Northern Illinois State		–		4	–	2	–	1
Carthage		–		3	–	2	–	0
Lake Forest		–		3	–	2	–	0
Nebraska		–		6	–	4	–	0
Wittenberg		–		5	–	4	–	1
Heidelberg		–		3	–	3	–	1
Washington University		–		2	–	2	–	2
Beloit		–		3	–	4	–	1
Franklin		–		3	–	4	–	0
Doane		–		2	–	3	–	0
Shurtleff		–		2	–	4	–	2
Western State Normal		–		1	–	2	–	0
Mount Union		–		2	–	5	–	1
Drake		–		2	–	5	–	0
Haskell		–		2	–	5	–	0
Marquette		–		1	–	4	–	2
Chicago P&S		–		0	–	1	–	1
Cincinnati		–		0	–	7	–	2
Western Illinois		–		0	–	3	–	0

The 1906 Shurtleff football team represented Shurtleff College as an independent during the 1906 college football season. Led by Philip Arbuckle in his first and only season as head coach, Shurtleff compiled a record of 2–4–2. The team played home game on the grounds of Western Military Academy in Alton, Illinois.

Arbuckle concurrently coached at Western Military Academy.

== Schedule ==
Date	Time	Opponent	Site	Result	Source
September 29		Central High School (MO)	Western Military Academy grounds; Alton, IL	L 0–6	
October 6	3:00 p.m.	at Washington University	Washington University Stadium; St. Louis, MO	W 16–0	
October 12		at Cape Girardeau Normal	Cape Girardeau, MO	T 0–0	
October 19		St. Charles Military Academy	Western Military Academy grounds; Alton, IL	W 5–0	
November 3		at Washington University	Washington University Stadium; St. Louis, MO	T 12–12	
November 10		at Drury	Springfield, MO	L 0–18	
November 16		at Illinois College	Jacksonville, IL	L 5–12	
November 29		at Millikin	Millikin field; Decatur, IL	L 5–12	
All times are in Central time
