= 1906 Ohio Green and White football team =

American college football season

1906 Ohio Green and White football
- Conference: Independent
- Record: 7–1
- Head coach: Arthur McFarland (1st season)

1906 Midwestern college football independents records
	Conf.			Overall
Team	W	L	T	W		L		T
Saint Louis		–		11	–	0	–	0
North Dakota Agricultural		–		5	–	0	–	0
Butler		–		1	–	0	–	0
Michigan State Normal		–		5	–	0	–	1
Iowa State		–		9	–	1	–	0
Ohio		–		7	–	1	–	0
Notre Dame		–		6	–	1	–	0
St. Mary's (OH)		–		5	–	1	–	0
Fairmount		–		7	–	1	–	2
Wabash		–		5	–	1	–	1
South Dakota State		–		3	–	1	–	0
Kansas		–		7	–	2	–	2
Kansas State		–		5	–	2	–	0
Missouri		–		5	–	2	–	1
Detroit College		–		4	–	2	–	1
Northern Illinois State		–		4	–	2	–	1
Carthage		–		3	–	2	–	0
Lake Forest		–		3	–	2	–	0
Nebraska		–		6	–	4	–	0
Wittenberg		–		5	–	4	–	1
Heidelberg		–		3	–	3	–	1
Washington University		–		2	–	2	–	2
Beloit		–		3	–	4	–	1
Franklin		–		3	–	4	–	0
Doane		–		2	–	3	–	0
Shurtleff		–		2	–	4	–	2
Western State Normal		–		1	–	2	–	0
Mount Union		–		2	–	5	–	1
Drake		–		2	–	5	–	0
Haskell		–		2	–	5	–	0
Marquette		–		1	–	4	–	2
Chicago P&S		–		0	–	1	–	1
Cincinnati		–		0	–	7	–	2
Western Illinois		–		0	–	3	–	0

The 1906 Ohio Green and White football team was an American football team that represented Ohio University as an independent during the 1906 college football season. In its first season under head coach Arthur McFarland, the team compiled a 7–1 record and outscored opponents by a total of 158 to 28.

== Schedule ==
Date	Time	Opponent	Site	Result	Source
		Columbus East High School		W 20–0	
September 29		at West Virginia	Morgantown, WV	W 9–6	
October 6		at Otterbein	Westerville, OH	W 10–0	
		Buckhannon		W 65–0	
October 27		Muskingum	Athens, OH	W 16–5	
November 3	3:00 p.m.	at Cincinnati	League Park; Cincinnati, OH	W 16–5	
November 10		Denison	Athens, OH	W 20–0	
November 17		at Marietta	Marietta, OH	L 2–12	
