= 1906 Nebraska Cornhuskers football team =

American college football season

1906 Nebraska Cornhuskers football
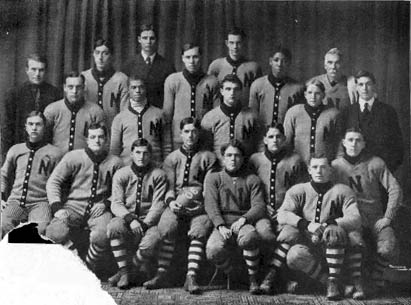

Nebraska state champion
- Conference: Independent
- Record: 6–4
- Head coach: Amos Foster (1st season)
- Home stadium: Antelope Field

1906 Midwestern college football independents records
	Conf.			Overall
Team	W	L	T	W		L		T
Saint Louis		–		11	–	0	–	0
North Dakota Agricultural		–		5	–	0	–	0
Butler		–		1	–	0	–	0
Michigan State Normal		–		5	–	0	–	1
Iowa State		–		9	–	1	–	0
Ohio		–		7	–	1	–	0
Notre Dame		–		6	–	1	–	0
St. Mary's (OH)		–		5	–	1	–	0
Fairmount		–		7	–	1	–	2
Wabash		–		5	–	1	–	1
South Dakota State		–		3	–	1	–	0
Kansas		–		7	–	2	–	2
Kansas State		–		5	–	2	–	0
Missouri		–		5	–	2	–	1
Detroit College		–		4	–	2	–	1
Northern Illinois State		–		4	–	2	–	1
Carthage		–		3	–	2	–	0
Lake Forest		–		3	–	2	–	0
Nebraska		–		6	–	4	–	0
Wittenberg		–		5	–	4	–	1
Heidelberg		–		3	–	3	–	1
Washington University		–		2	–	2	–	2
Beloit		–		3	–	4	–	1
Franklin		–		3	–	4	–	0
Doane		–		2	–	3	–	0
Shurtleff		–		2	–	4	–	2
Western State Normal		–		1	–	2	–	0
Mount Union		–		2	–	5	–	1
Drake		–		2	–	5	–	0
Haskell		–		2	–	5	–	0
Marquette		–		1	–	4	–	2
Chicago P&S		–		0	–	1	–	1
Cincinnati		–		0	–	7	–	2
Western Illinois		–		0	–	3	–	0

The 1906 Nebraska Cornhuskers football team represented the University of Nebraska in the 1906 college football season. The team was coached by first-year head coach Amos Foster and played its home games at Antelope Field in Lincoln, Nebraska. The team competed as an independent.

Prior to replacing the retiring Walter C. Booth at NU, Foster compiled an 11–4 record in two years coaching Cincinnati. Foster left Nebraska following the season and was quickly offered his old job at Cincinnati, but declined, instead accepting an offer to coach at Miami University in Oxford, Ohio.

Following the 1905 season, United States President Theodore Roosevelt urged among the new rules adopted in 1906 included the legalization of the forward pass, an increase in the distance required to get a first down, the abolishment of the dangerous flying wedge, and the establishment of a neutral zone between the offense and defense at the line of scrimmage.

== Schedule ==
Date	Time	Opponent	Site	Result	Attendance	Source
September 29		Hastings	Antelope Field; Lincoln, NE	W 56–0		
October 6		South Dakota	Antelope Field; Lincoln, NE	W 4–0		
October 13		Drake	Antelope Field; Lincoln, NE	W 5–0		
October 20		Iowa State	Antelope Field; Lincoln, NE (rivalry)	L 2–14		
October 27		Doane	Antelope Field; Lincoln, NE	W 28–0		
November 3		at Minnesota	Northrop Field; Minneapolis, MN (rivalry)	L 0–13	5,000	
November 10	3:30 p.m.	at Creighton	Vinton Street Park; Omaha, NE	W 17–0		
November 17	2:30 p.m.	Kansas	Antelope Field; Lincoln, NE (rivalry)	L 6–8		
November 24		at Chicago	Marshall Field; Chicago, IL	L 5–38		
November 29	2:30 p.m.	Cincinnati	Antelope Field; Lincoln, NE	W 41–0	2,500	

== Coaching staff ==
Coach	Position	First year	Alma mater
Amos Foster	Head coach	1906	Dartmouth
T. M. Stewart	Assistant coach	1906	Michigan
Jack Best	Trainer	1890	Nebraska

== Roster ==
Benedict, Maurice E
Chaloupka, William FB
Cooke, Harold QB
Cornell G
Craig, Hugh FB
Denslow, Lloyd E
Drain, Dale QB
Ewing, Henry LT
Harvey, James E/LT
Johnson, William E
Little, Ernest (Merle) E
Mason, John LT
Matters, Thomas LT
McDonald, Gil QB
Rice, John RT
Schmidt, Francis E
Taylor, Robert RG
Voss RT
Weller, John HB
Wilke, C.R. C

== Game summaries ==
=== Hastings ===
Hastings at Nebraska

Team	1	2	Total
Hastings			0
• Nebraska			56

- Date: September 29
- Location: Antelope Field, Lincoln, NE

=== South Dakota ===
South Dakota at Nebraska

Team	1	2	Total
South Dakota	0	0	0
• Nebraska	0	4	4

- Date: October 6
- Location: Antelope Field, Lincoln, NE

=== Drake ===
Drake at Nebraska

Team	1	2	Total
Drake			0
• Nebraska			5

- Date: October 13
- Location: Antelope Field, Lincoln, NE

=== Iowa State ===
Iowa State at Nebraska

Team	1	2	Total
• Iowa State			14
Nebraska			2

- Date: October 20
- Location: Antelope Field, Lincoln, NE

Nebraska's 35-game home field winning streak, dating back to the beginning of the 1901 season, was broken when Iowa State beat NU 14–2. Only a late safety prevented Nebraska from being shut out.

=== Doane ===
Doane at Nebraska

Team	1	2	Total
Doane			0
• Nebraska			28

- Date: October 27
- Location: Antelope Field, Lincoln, NE

=== At Minnesota ===
Nebraska at Minnesota

Team	1	2	Total
Nebraska	0	0	0
• Minnesota	0	13	13

- Date: November 3
- Location: Northrop Field, Minneapolis, MN

Minnesota shut out the Cornhuskers in Minneapolis for the second consecutive year in a game that remained scoreless until after halftime. Minnesota finished the season as co-champion of the Big Nine.

=== At Creighton ===
Creighton at Nebraska

Team	1	2	Total
Creighton			0
• Nebraska			17

- Date: November 10
- Location: Omaha, NE

Nebraska shut out Creighton in Omaha in the final game between the two teams. NU defeated all other in-state teams for the third year in a row to claim another state championship.

=== Kansas ===
Kansas at Nebraska

Team	1	2	Total
• Kansas	8	0	8
Nebraska	6	0	6

- Date: November 17
- Location: Antelope Field, Lincoln, NE

KU defeated a sloppy Nebraska team in the first game in a streak of 107 consecutive seasons the two teams played, still an NCAA record.

=== At Chicago ===
Nebraska at Chicago

Team	1	2	Total
Nebraska			5
• Chicago			38

- Date: November 24
- Location: Stagg Field, Chicago, IL

Nebraska was shut out by Chicago, then a member of the Big Nine Conference, in the first meeting between the two teams.

=== Cincinnati ===
Cincinnati at Nebraska

Team	1	2	Total
Cincinnati			0
• Nebraska			41

- Date: November 29
- Location: Antelope Field, Lincoln, NE

Foster's former team traveled to Lincoln in what is still the only game ever played between Cincinnati and Nebraska. The teams were scheduled to play in 2020, but the game was canceled due to the COVID-19 pandemic. Cincinnati and Nebraska are scheduled to meet for the second time in 2025.
