= 1906 Kansas State Aggies football team =

American college football season

1906 Kansas State Aggies football
- Conference: Independent
- Record: 5–2
- Head coach: Mike Ahearn (2nd season)

1906 Midwestern college football independents records
	Conf.			Overall
Team	W	L	T	W		L		T
Saint Louis		–		11	–	0	–	0
North Dakota Agricultural		–		5	–	0	–	0
Butler		–		1	–	0	–	0
Michigan State Normal		–		5	–	0	–	1
Iowa State		–		9	–	1	–	0
Ohio		–		7	–	1	–	0
Notre Dame		–		6	–	1	–	0
St. Mary's (OH)		–		5	–	1	–	0
Fairmount		–		7	–	1	–	2
Wabash		–		5	–	1	–	1
South Dakota State		–		3	–	1	–	0
Kansas		–		7	–	2	–	2
Kansas State		–		5	–	2	–	0
Missouri		–		5	–	2	–	1
Detroit College		–		4	–	2	–	1
Northern Illinois State		–		4	–	2	–	1
Carthage		–		3	–	2	–	0
Lake Forest		–		3	–	2	–	0
Nebraska		–		6	–	4	–	0
Wittenberg		–		5	–	4	–	1
Heidelberg		–		3	–	3	–	1
Washington University		–		2	–	2	–	2
Beloit		–		3	–	4	–	1
Franklin		–		3	–	4	–	0
Doane		–		2	–	3	–	0
Shurtleff		–		2	–	4	–	2
Western State Normal		–		1	–	2	–	0
Mount Union		–		2	–	5	–	1
Drake		–		2	–	5	–	0
Haskell		–		2	–	5	–	0
Marquette		–		1	–	4	–	2
Chicago P&S		–		0	–	1	–	1
Cincinnati		–		0	–	7	–	2
Western Illinois		–		0	–	3	–	0

The 1906 Kansas State Aggies football team represented Kansas State Agricultural College during the 1906 college football season.

== Schedule ==
Date	Opponent	Site	Result	Source
October 13	Haskell	Manhattan, KS	W 10–5	
October 22	College of Emporia	Manhattan, KS	W 35–0	
October 27	at Washburn	Topeka, KS	L 4–5	
November 5	Fairmount	Manhattan, KS	L 6–12	
November 12	Ottawa	Manhattan, KS	W 32–11	
November 23	Kansas	Manhattan, KS (rivalry)	W 6–4	
November 29	Kansas State Normal	Manhattan, KS	W 10–0	
