= 1906 Michigan State Normal Normalites football team =

American college football season

1906 Michigan State Normal Normalites football
- Conference: Independent
- Record: 5–0–1
- Head coach: Henry Schulte (1st season)
- Captain: Leroy N. Brown

1906 Midwestern college football independents records
	Conf.			Overall
Team	W	L	T	W		L		T
Saint Louis		–		11	–	0	–	0
North Dakota Agricultural		–		5	–	0	–	0
Butler		–		1	–	0	–	0
Michigan State Normal		–		5	–	0	–	1
Iowa State		–		9	–	1	–	0
Ohio		–		7	–	1	–	0
Notre Dame		–		6	–	1	–	0
St. Mary's (OH)		–		5	–	1	–	0
Fairmount		–		7	–	1	–	2
Wabash		–		5	–	1	–	1
South Dakota State		–		3	–	1	–	0
Kansas		–		7	–	2	–	2
Kansas State		–		5	–	2	–	0
Missouri		–		5	–	2	–	1
Detroit College		–		4	–	2	–	1
Northern Illinois State		–		4	–	2	–	1
Carthage		–		3	–	2	–	0
Lake Forest		–		3	–	2	–	0
Nebraska		–		6	–	4	–	0
Wittenberg		–		5	–	4	–	1
Heidelberg		–		3	–	3	–	1
Washington University		–		2	–	2	–	2
Beloit		–		3	–	4	–	1
Franklin		–		3	–	4	–	0
Doane		–		2	–	3	–	0
Shurtleff		–		2	–	4	–	2
Western State Normal		–		1	–	2	–	0
Mount Union		–		2	–	5	–	1
Drake		–		2	–	5	–	0
Haskell		–		2	–	5	–	0
Marquette		–		1	–	4	–	2
Chicago P&S		–		0	–	1	–	1
Cincinnati		–		0	–	7	–	2
Western Illinois		–		0	–	3	–	0

The 1906 Michigan State Normal Normalites football team represented Michigan State Normal College (later renamed Eastern Michigan University) as an independent during the 1906 college football season. In their first season under head coach Henry Schulte, the Normalites compiled a record of 5–0–1, shut out four of six opponents, and outscored all opponents by a combined total of 52 to 11. Leroy N. Brown was the team captain.

Henry Shulte began his association with Michigan Normal in 1905 as the school's track coach. He had been a football player at the University of Michigan on Fielding H. Yost's "Point-a-Minute" teams from 1903 to 1905.

In early October 1906, Michigan Normal reported record enrollment with 1,000 students having enrolled on the first day (quintupling the prior first-day enrollment of 200); total enrollment was expected to reach 1,500.

== Schedule ==
Date	Opponent	Site	Result	Source
October 20	at Michigan School for the Deaf	Flint, MI	T 0–0	
October 25	Detroit College	Ypsilanti, MI	W 6–0	
November 3	at Adrian	Adrian, MI	W 6–0	
November 10	Michigan School for the Deaf	Ypsilanti, MI	W 16–0	
November 17	at Western State Normal	Kalamazoo, MI	W 14–5	
November 27	Hillsdale	Ypsilanti, MI	W 10–6	
