= Drake Stadium (1904) =

Stadium in Des Moines, Iowa

Haskins Field
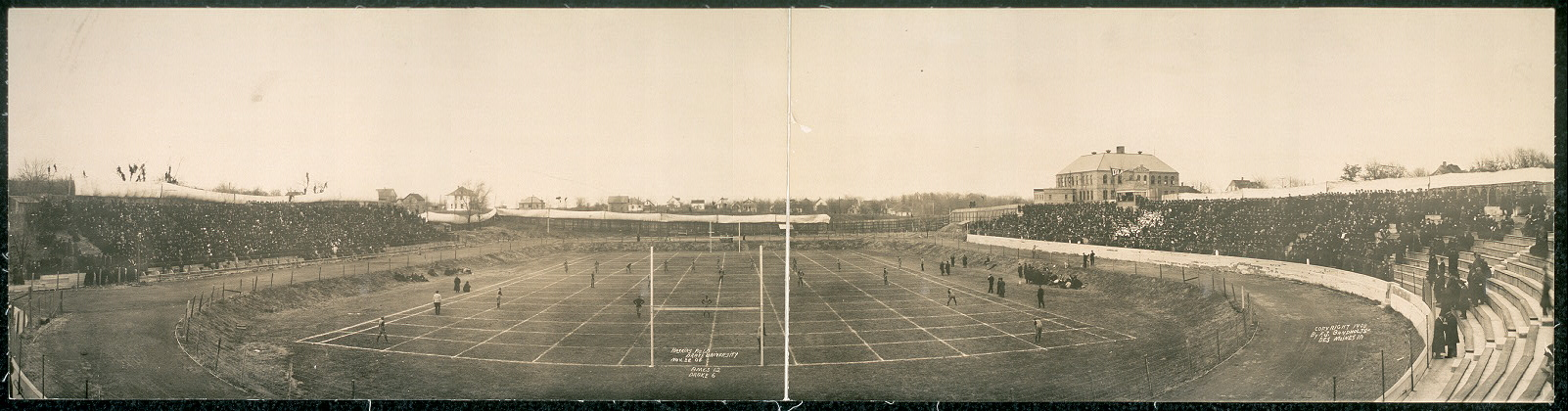
- Former names: Haskins Field (1904–1909)
- Owner: Drake University
- Operator: Drake University
- Capacity: 12,000 (1925); 2,500 (1904)
- Surface: Grass

Construction
- Opened: 1904
- Closed: 1925
- Demolished: 1925

Tenants
- Drake football (NCAA) (1904–1924); Drake Relays (1910–1925)

Drake Stadium was a stadium in Des Moines, Iowa. Originally named Haskins Field, for the son of a primary donor, stadium opened on October 8, 1904 with the University of Iowa winning 17–0 over Drake. The name of the stadium was changed to Drake Stadium in 1910 at the request of the Haskins. It is distinct from the existing Drake Stadium built in 1925.

In 1907, renovations occurred that added seating, bringing the total to 6,700 and a drainage system was also added. Haskins Field had been expected to be able to hold 40,000 fans if expanded to its maximum capacity.

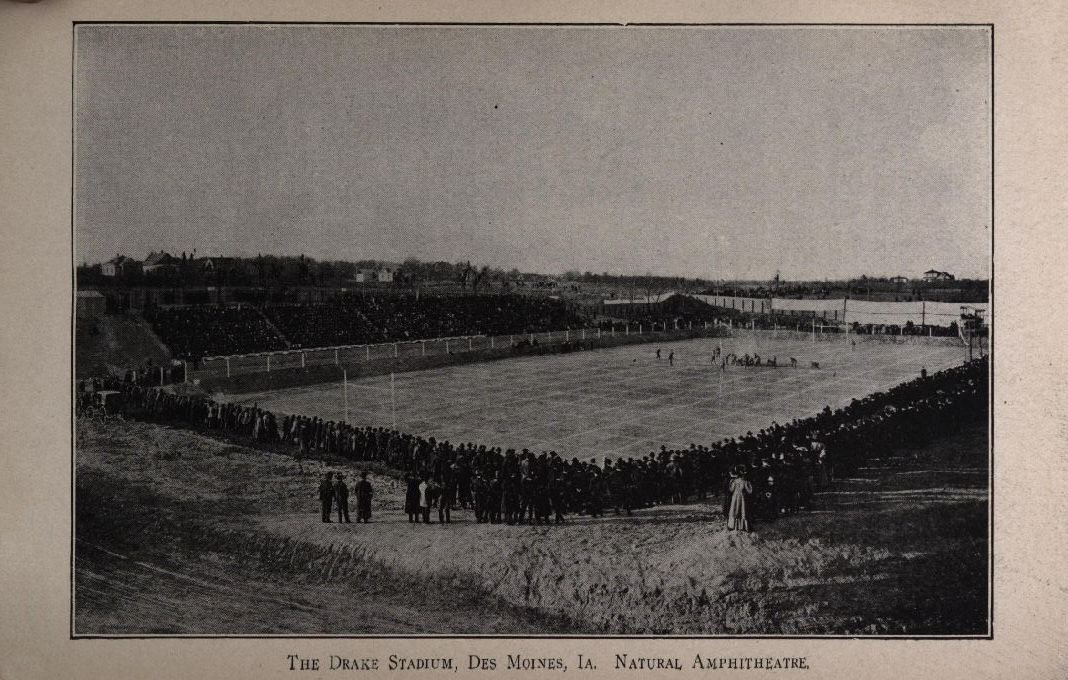

Subsequent additions led to a total capacity of 12,000 prior to its closure and demolition.
