= 1906 college football season =

American college football season

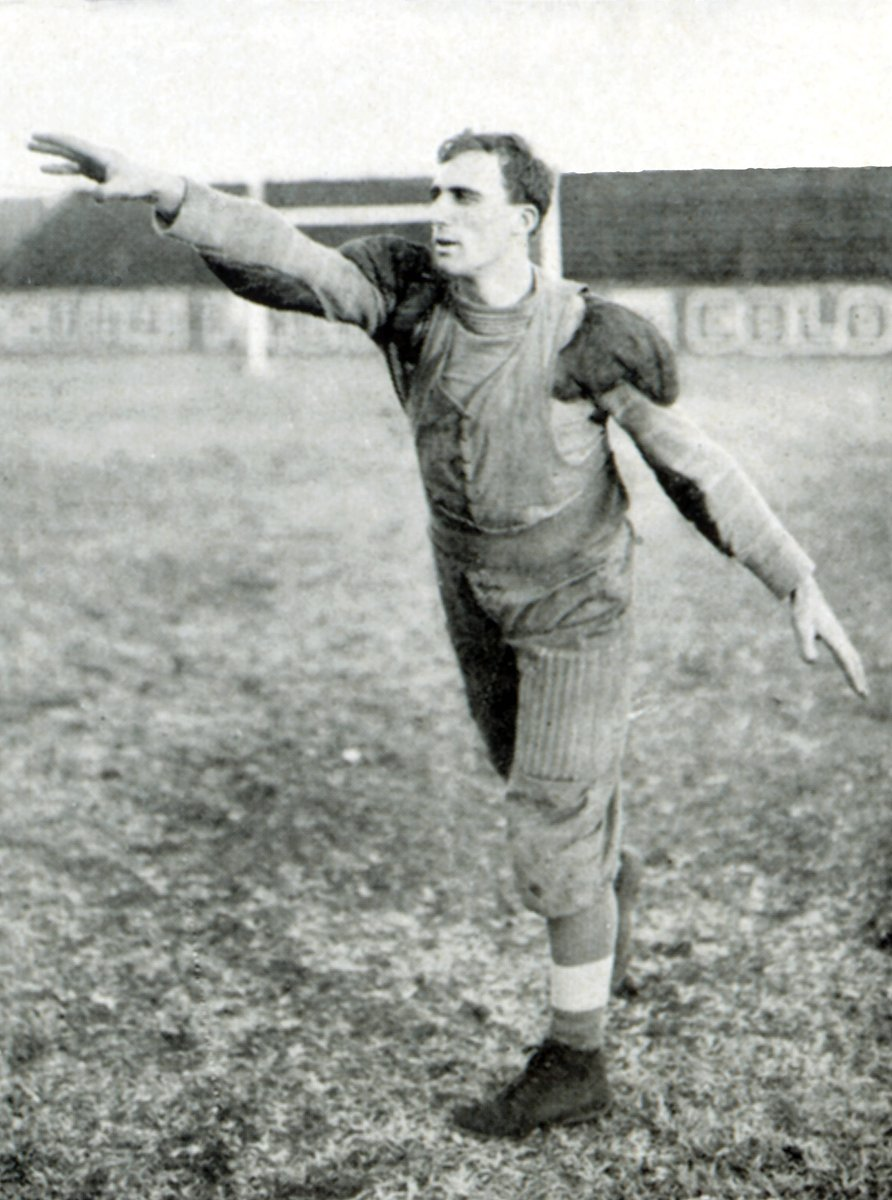
- Photograph of Brad Robinson, who threw the first legal forward pass on September 5.
- Champion(s): Princeton; Yale

The 1906 college football season was the first in which the forward pass was permitted. Although there was no clear cut national championship, there were two teams that had won all nine of their games as the 1906 season drew to a close, the Princeton Tigers and the Yale Bulldogs, and on November 17, 1906, they played to a 0–0 tie. St. Louis University finished at 11–0–0. The Helms Athletic Foundation, founded in 1936, declared retroactively that Princeton had been the best college football team of 1906. Other selectors recognized Yale as the national champions for 1906.

== New rules to save football ==
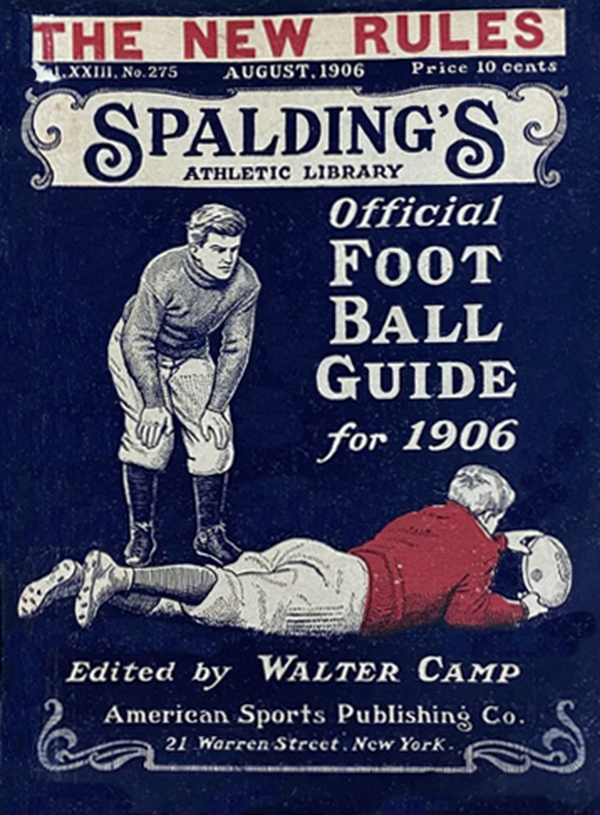
Cover of the 1906 Spalding Foot Ball Guide depicted a kicker and holder preparing to attempt a point-after-touchdown.

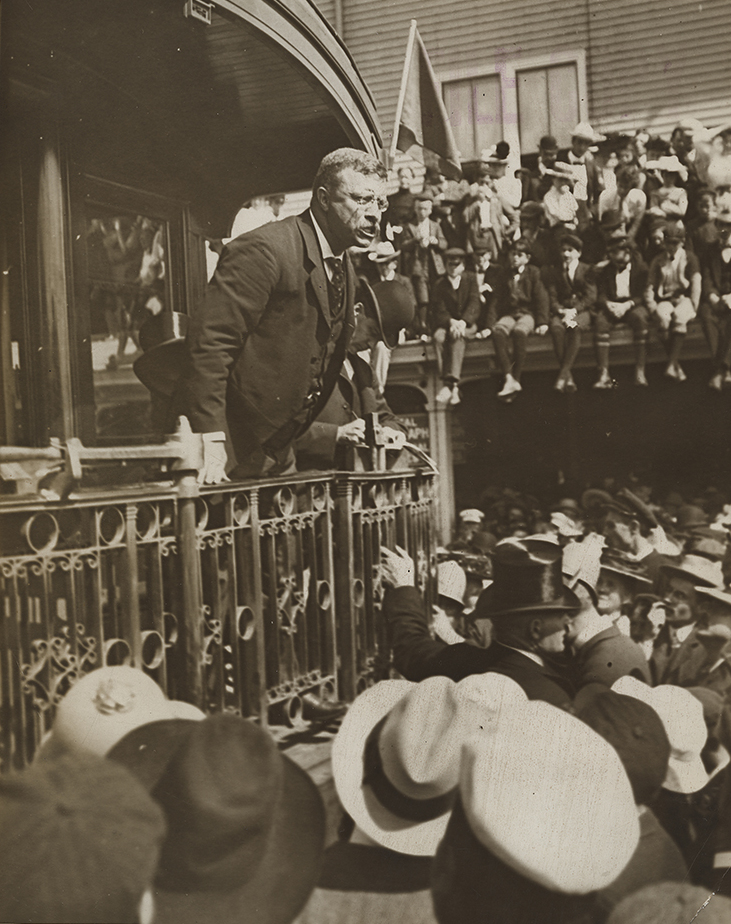
President Theodore Roosevelt

Although his nearsightedness kept him off the Harvard varsity squad, Theodore Roosevelt was a vocal exponent of football's contribution to the "strenuous life", both on and off the field. He helped revive the annual Harvard–Yale football series after it had been canceled for two years following the violent 1894 clash that was deemed "the bloodbath at Hampden Park." His belief that the football field was a proving ground for the battlefield was validated by the performance of his fellow Rough Riders, who were former football standouts. "In life, as in a football game," he wrote, "the principle to follow is: Hit the line hard; don't foul and don't shirk, but hit the line hard!" In 1903, the president told an audience, "I believe in rough games and in rough, manly sports. I do not feel any particular sympathy for the person who gets battered about a good deal so long as it is not fatal." He summoned the head coaches and representatives of the premier collegiate powers—Harvard, Yale, and Princeton—to the White House on October 9, 1905. Roosevelt urged them to curb excessive violence and make an example of fair play for the rest of the country. The schools released a statement condemning brutality and pledging to keep the game clean.

Following the 1905 season, Stanford and California switched to rugby while Columbia, Northwestern, and Duke dropped football. Harvard president Charles William Eliot, who considered football "more brutalizing than prizefighting, cockfighting or bullfighting", warned that Harvard could be next, a move that could have been a crushing blow to the college game. Roosevelt wrote in a letter to a friend that he would not let Eliot "emasculate football", and that he hoped to "minimize the danger" without football having to be played "on too ladylike a basis." Roosevelt again used his bully pulpit. He urged radical rule changes and invited other school leaders to the White House during the off-season.

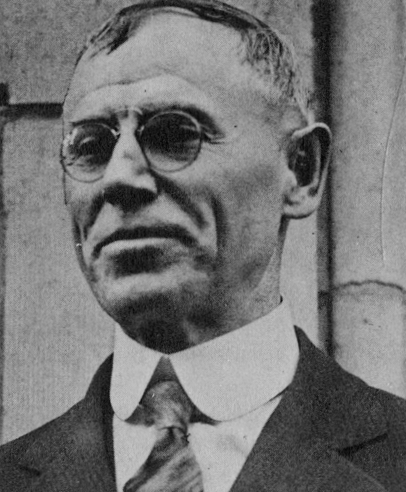
Coach John Heisman

An intercollegiate conference, which would become the forerunner of the National Collegiate Athletic Association (NCAA), approved radical rule changes for the 1906 season. They legalized the forward pass, abolished the dangerous flying wedge, created a neutral zone between offense and defense, and doubled the first-down distance to 10 yards, to be gained in three downs. Georgia Tech coach John Heisman had seen the forward pass attempted in 1895 in a Georgia vs. North Carolina game, and lobbied for its legalization starting in 1903. After unsuccessfully attempting for three years to convince Rules Committee chairman Walter Camp to legalize the play, Heisman enlisted the valuable support of committee members John C. Bell and Paul Dashiell instead. Finally, in 1906, the Rules Committee, college football's governing body at the time, legalized the forward pass.

The American Intercollegiate Football Rules Committee met at the Murray Hill Hotel in New York City beginning January 12, 1906, to create measures "for squelching brutality and all forms of unnecessary roughness." Numerous changes were made, the primary one being the legalization of the forward pass. Various persons are given credit for the suggestion. Heisman, Bell, and Dr. J. William White were later credited with designing rules that would permit a pass while still being acceptable to a majority of the rules committee. Among the other rule changes made for the 1906 season included:

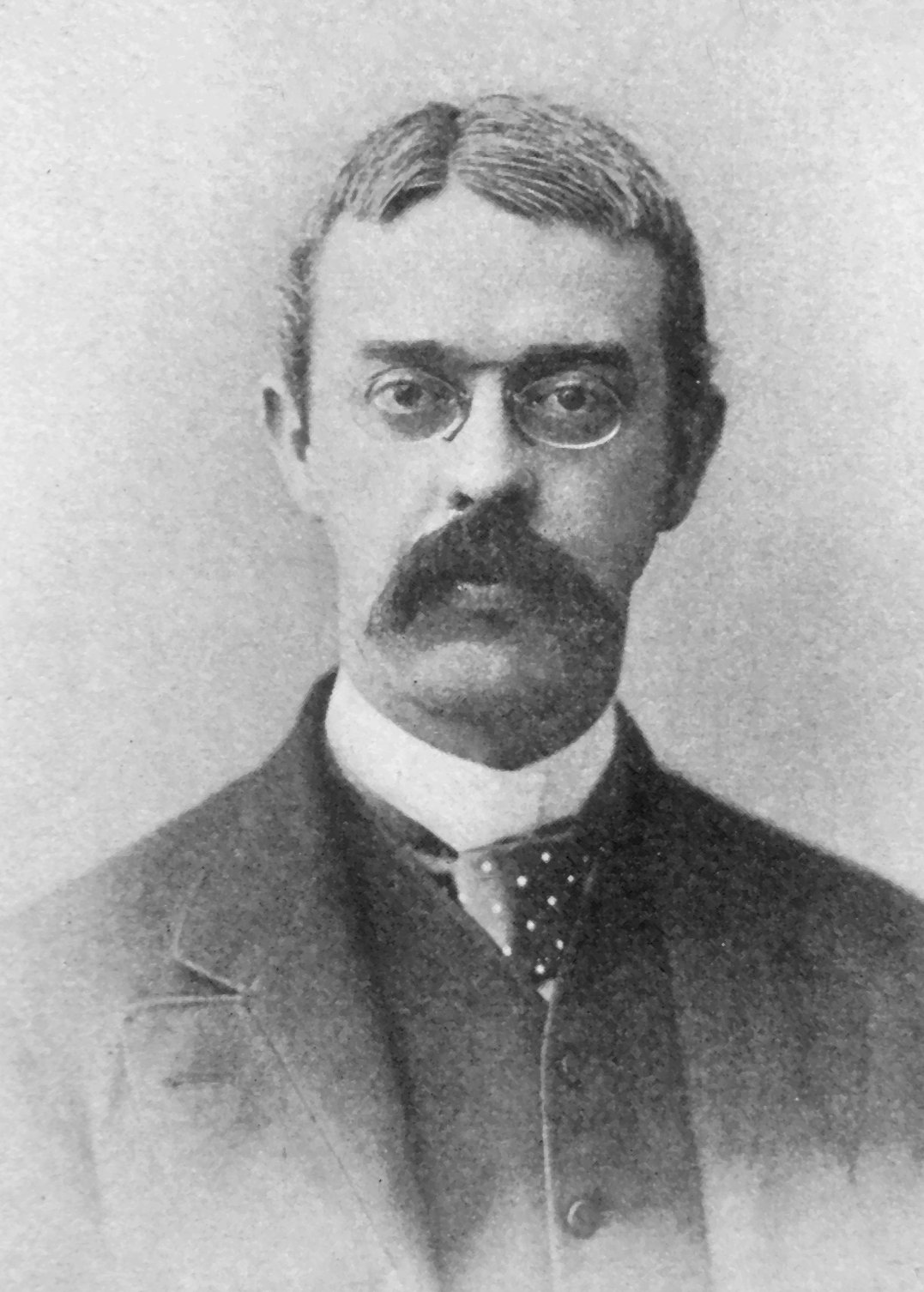
Dr. J. William White

1. Length of game reduced from 70 minutes to two halves of 30 minutes each.
2. The two teams would be separated by a neutral zone (the length of the ball) at the line of scrimmage.
3. Team had to gain 10 yards in 3 plays rather than 5 yards for a first down (see 1905 Fairmount vs. Washburn football game).
4. Hurdling was penalized.
5. Offensive linemen had to drop back five yards behind scrimmage if not moving forward.
6. Field marked with lines every five yards.
7. A fourth official added to enforce the rules.

Even with the approval of a forward pass, the rules for American football in 1906 were still significantly different than the ones of a century later, as many of the present rules (100-yard field, four downs to gain ten yards, 6-point touchdown and 3-point field goal) were adopted in 1912. The rules in 1906 were:

- Field 110 yards in length
- Kickoff made from midfield
- Three downs to gain ten yards
- Touchdown worth 5 points
- Field goal worth 4 points
- Forward pass legal, but subject to penalties

Although a forward pass was made legal, that play in 1906 was still a risky business, because an incomplete attempt would result in stiff penalties — 15 yards back from the spot from which the pass was thrown on first or second down. If the defense committed a foul, the 15-yard penalty did not apply to the offense, but the defending team was not penalized either. In addition, a pass could not be caught more than 20 yards beyond the line of scrimmage, nor beyond the goal line (the end zone had not yet been invented). The passing game in the west (typified by St. Louis University) was closer to today's version than that in the east; the quarterback would fire the ball directly to an open receiver. The style used by Yale and Harvard, recounted later by a referee of the day, Horatio B. Hackett, was "the ball is thrown high in the air, and the runner who is to catch it is protected by several of his teammates forming an interference for him."

Not everyone was impressed with the improved version of college football, particularly in California. "I do not believe the present experiment in American college football can survive," said the President of the University of California, Benjamin Ide Wheeler. He added, "In my opinion, the whole country will within five years be playing the Rugby game."

== Conference and program changes ==
School	1905 conference	1906 conference
California Golden Bears	Independent	Program suspended
Carnegie Tech Tartans	Program Established	Independent
Florida Gators	Program Established	Independent

== September ==
The Yale Bulldogs had enjoyed a 10–0–0 record in 1905, shutting out all of their opponents except for the Princeton Tigers, whom they had allowed a touchdown. In the West, the Michigan Wolverines, coached by Fielding "Hurry Up" Yost, had shut out their first 12 opponents, before playing the 9–0–0 University of Chicago Maroons. Chicago not only avoided a shutout, but handed Michigan a 2–0 loss. In the South, Georgia Tech had gone 6–0–1.

September 5 marked the first use of the forward pass in a college football game. In its 22–0 win over Carroll College in Waukesha, Wisconsin, on a Wednesday afternoon, St. Louis University unveiled a new offensive style. SLU's coach, Eddie Cochems, had his team secretly practice the play. Though the first attempt was incomplete (resulting in a turnover), the next one was successful, as Bradbury Robinson threw to Jack Schneider, who then ran the rest of the way for a touchdown. St. Louis would go on to an 11–0–0 record, outscoring its opponents 407–31, including Marquette (30–0), Kansas (34–2), Drake (32–9) and Iowa (39–0).

The season began in earnest on September 22, with some of the more powerful teams holding their lesser opposition scoreless, and on their home field. Harvard beat Williams 7–0, Carlisle over Villanova 6–0, Dartmouth defeated Norwich 5–0. Penn State had a 24–0 win over Lebanon Valley. In the west, Kansas had an 18–0 victory over William Jewell College. In one of the few games where both teams scored, Holy Cross hosted Massachusetts in Philadelphia and won 6–4. Harvard played a midweek game on September 26, beating Bowdoin 10–0.

On September 29, Princeton opened its season with a 24–0 win over Villanova, and Penn beat Lehigh 32–6. At West Point, the United States Military Academy ("Army") won 12–0 over Tufts. The universities of Maine, Vermont, New Hampshire and Massachusetts were all shut out by, respectively, Harvard (17–0), Dartmouth (8–0), Brown (12–0) and Williams (5–0). Penn State, Swarthmore and Dickinson all registered 26–0 wins over, Allegheny, Johns Hopkins and Lebanon Valley, respectively. Pitt defeated Westminster 17–0. Colgate and Cornell played to a 0–0 tie at Ithaca, while out west, another Cornell (of Iowa) lost to Iowa State, 81–0. Carlisle went one better, beating Albright 82–0. In the South, Georgia Tech and Maryville tied 6–6 in Atlanta, and Davidson and North Carolina were scoreless.

== October ==
October 6: Harvard won its fourth game, but its 27–6 win over Bates took the Crimson out of the ranks of the unscored upon. Meanwhile, other teams recorded their third consecutive shutouts. Swarthmore beat visiting Villanova 4–0, and Penn State won at Carlisle by the same 4–0 score. Dartmouth bested Holy Cross, 16–0 and Princeton beat Stevens 22–0. Army over Trinity (24–0), Yale had opened its season midweek (October 3, 21–0 over Wesleyan) and then beat Syracuse (51–0) (Wesleyan itself lost 17–0 to Brown). In the west, Iowa State's team beat Coe College 36–0 on Friday, then Des Moines 45–0 the next day. Maryville, at that time a regular southern opponent powerhouse, lost at Alabama, 6–0; two days earlier, it had lost to Ole Miss 16–6. Michigan opened its season with a 28–0 win over visiting Case.

October 13: Princeton, Yale, Dartmouth, and Brown remained unscored upon, as did Lafayette, Pittsburgh and Swarthmore. Playing on 3 Saturdays and 2 Wednesdays, the Princeton Tigers played five games in fifteen days (Sep 29 to Oct 13), beating Villanova, Stevens, Washington & Jefferson, Lehigh (52–0), and in Annapolis on this date, a 5–0 win over Navy. Brown had beaten Massachusetts 17–0 on a Wednesday afternoon. Yale defeated Holy Cross 17–0 and Maine 4–0. Swarthmore eked out a win at Penn, 4–0. Harvard, 5–0–0 but not scorefree, defeated Massachusetts 21–0. Army and Colgate played to a 0–0 tie.

In the West, Kansas defeated Arkansas 37–5 and Nebraska beat Drake 5–0. In the South, Vanderbilt defeated Ole Miss at home, 29–0 and Texas beat TCU 22–0. Georgia Tech beat Tennessee-Chattanooga 18–0 to reach 2–0–1. Clemson opened its season with a 0–0 tie with visiting Virginia Tech. Other colleges stayed unscored upon, but against smaller opponents (Iowa State 32–0 over Morningside, Mississippi State 62–0 over Marion).

October 20: Yale stayed unscored on with a 10–0 win over Penn State, and Dartmouth beat Massachusetts 26–0. Princeton, however, gave up points in a 32–4 win over Bucknell. Swarthmore beat GWU 17–0. Harvard had a 44–0 win over Springfield. Lafayette defeated North Carolina in Norfolk, VA, 28–6. Brown was handed its first defeat, a 14–0 loss at Pennsylvania, while Pitt lost to Carlisle, 22–0.

After warming up with small colleges, Iowa State won at Nebraska, 14–2, while Kansas beat visiting Oklahoma 20–4. Michigan won at Ohio State, 6–0. In the South, Vanderbilt handed Alabama a 78–0 loss. After tuneup wins against Mooney and Rhodes, Sewanee won at Georgia Tech, 16–0. Clemson beat Georgia 6–0, and played a Thursday afternoon 0–0 tie against NC State.

October 27: Yale stayed unscored on, with a 12–0 win over Amherst. Harvard won at Army, 5–0. Swarthmore yielded a score in a 19–4 win over Gettysburg. Lafayette beat Colgate 17–6. Dartmouth and Williams College played to a 0–0 tie.

Kansas beat Colorado, 16–0 but Iowa State lost at Minnesota, 22–4, and Missouri lost its first outing against a large school, falling 26–4 at Iowa. Michigan beat visiting Illinois, 28–9. Vanderbilt beat Texas, 45–0. Mississippi State and LSU played to a 0–0 tie. Sewanee had beaten Auburn 10–5 in a Friday afternoon game at Birmingham. Georgia Tech beat Davidson 4–0.

== November ==
November 3 The Yale Bulldogs traveled to West Point, and finally yielded some points, with the Army Cadets taking a 6–0 lead at halftime. Yale made no first downs, but won the game anyway. Clarence Alcott blocked a punt and returned it for a touchdown to tie the game 6–6 on the point after. With two minutes left, Bigelow of Yale kicked a 35-yard field goal (for 4 points) from a steep angle, and a 10–6 win.

Unbeaten Princeton (7–0–0) and Dartmouth (5–0–1) met in New Jersey, and it was no contest. The Princeton Tigers shut down the Big Green, 42–0 with seven touchdowns. Harvard beat Brown 9–5 (on a field goal with three minutes left) to reach 8–0–0 as well. Swarthmore defeated Amherst, 21–0, and Lafayette beat Washington & Jefferson 14–6, to stay unbeaten. Carlisle defeated Syracuse, 9–4 in a game in Buffalo.

Out West, previously unbeaten Kansas traveled to meet St. Louis to match their rushing game against Eddie Cochem's pass attack. St. Louis made all the points, including the safety, for a 34–2 win. Vanderbilt (4–0) traveled to Ann Arbor to take on Michigan (3–0), and lost, 10–4. Sewanee visited Tennessee at won, 17–0, while Georgia Tech pasted Auburn 11–0. Clemson had its 3rd 0–0 tie, this one with Davidson, for a 1–0–3 record.

November 10 In the East, the number of unbeaten and untied teams went from five to just three: Harvard, Princeton and Yale. Lafayette and Penn played to a 0–0 tie in Philadelphia; the Quakers drove 59 yards to the one, but were held by Lafayette's goal line defense. At Annapolis, Swarthmore lost at Navy, 5–4, the result of a touchdown against a field goal. Before a crowd of 25,000 Harvard beat visiting Carlisle, 5–0, and Yale beat Brown by the same score Princeton won at West Point, 8–0.

In the South, Sewanee stayed unbeaten with a 35–0 win in New Orleans over Tulane (followed two days later by a 24–0 in over Ole Miss in Memphis). Vanderbilt beat Rose-Hulman College, 33–0 to reach 5–1–0 and Georgia Tech won at Georgia, 17–0. Clemson beat Tennessee 16–0. Texas A&M played TCU a second time; the first time around, TCU lost 42–0, and the second contest was a 22–0 loss.

November 17 The big game of the season (making the front pages the next day) was at Princeton, New Jersey, where 26,000 watched Yale and Princeton (both 8–0–0) faced off at Osborns Field. Both teams tried out the forward pass, described in The New York Times as "these spectacular new–fangled plays". Yale crashed the Princeton line in the final minutes, gaining at least 4 yards on each carry, but time ran out just as the Bulldogs reached the ten yard line, and the game ended in a 0–0 tie.

Harvard became the last unbeaten and untied team, as its 22–9 win over Dartmouth gave it a record of 10–0–0. Princeton's season was over, but the annual Harvard–Yale game was still to be played. Cornell (7–1–1) hosted Swarthmore (7–1–0) and came away with a 28–0 victory. Previously unbeaten Lafayette (6–0–1) hosted 4–3–0 Syracuse and was upset, 12–4. Penn State beat Dickinson in Williamsport, PA, 6–0. In Philadelphia, 15,000 watched the visiting Michigan Wolverines lose 17–0 to the Pennsylvania Quakers.

In the West, Kansas played at Nebraska, winning 8–6 to extend its record to 7–1–1. Iowa State beat Grinnell 25–6 to reach 7–1–0. Carlisle visited Minnesota and won 17–0

In the South, Sewanee beat Maryville to reach an 8–0–0 record, and Vanderbilt beat Georgia Tech 37–6 to reach 6–1–0. Their annual game was set for Thanksgiving Day, which in 1907 fell on November 29. Texas A&M won at Tulane, 18–0, and two days later won at LSU, 22–12, to reach 5–0–0. The Alabama–Auburn game ended with Bama winning 10–0.

November 24 The big game of the season was Harvard (10–0–0) at Yale (8–0–1). A crowd of 32,000 in New Haven saw the Crimson–Blue meeting, described as "a game as has seldom been seen on any field", with both sides relying heavily on the forward pass. . Paul Veeder threw a pass and Clarence Alcott jumped high to catch it at the 3 yard line for a first down. Two plays later, Tom Roome forced his way through the line for Yale's touchdown. A Harvard fumble in the closing minutes was recovered by the Bulldogs, who were 12 yards from goal when the whistle blew. Final score: Yale 6, Harvard 0.

With that final game, both Yale and Princeton closed their seasons with identical 9–0–1 records, nine wins each and their own 0–0 tie. Other games played that day were Lafayette's 33–0 win over Lehigh, and Penn State 10–0 over West Virginia.

Thanksgiving Day, November 29, 1907, was the next best thing to post-season play, as rivals met on the holiday. Cornell and Penn played to a 0–0 tie and Lafayette beat Dickinson 26–6 and Penn State won at Pittsburgh, 6–0, giving both teams an 8–1–1 finish. In the West, Iowa State won at Drake, 7–0, and Texas beat Texas A&M 24–0. Both teams finished at 9–1–0. Further West, college football wasn't yet played on the Pacific Coast; the big game there had been Stanford's 6–3 win at Berkeley over California—in a rugby game attended by 10,000 fans

In Nashville, Sewanee (8–0–0) and Vanderbilt (7–1–0) met on Thanksgiving for the South's biggest game. Vandy, whose only loss was its visit to Michigan, handed the Sewanee Tigers a 20–0 defeat. Alabama crushed Tennessee, 51–0, to finish 5–1–0, while the Vols' record was 1–6–2; the win, and one of the ties, was against American College. Clemson won at Georgia Tech, 10–0, closing its season unbeaten, though not untied (4–0–3).

== Conference standings ==
=== Major conference standings ===
1906 Colorado Football Association standings
	Conf.					Overall
Team	W		L		T	W		L		T
Colorado Mines $	2	–	0	–	2	2	–	0	–	2
Colorado	1	–	1	–	2	2	–	3	–	4
Denver	2	–	2	–	0	2	–	3	–	0
Colorado College	1	–	2	–	1	3	–	2	–	2
Colorado Agricultural	1	–	2	–	1	1	–	2	–	1
$ – Conference champion

1906 Southern Intercollegiate Athletic Association football standings
	Conf.					Overall
Team	W		L		T	W		L		T
Vanderbilt +	4	–	0	–	0	8	–	1	–	0
Clemson +	4	–	0	–	0	4	–	0	–	3
Sewanee	5	–	1	–	0	8	–	1	–	0
Alabama	3	–	1	–	0	5	–	1	–	0
Ole Miss	3	–	2	–	0	4	–	2	–	0
Georgia Tech	3	–	3	–	0	6	–	3	–	1
Georgia	2	–	2	–	1	2	–	4	–	1
LSU	0	–	1	–	1	2	–	2	–	2
Mississippi A&M	0	–	2	–	1	2	–	2	–	1
Tennessee	0	–	3	–	1	1	–	6	–	2
Mercer	0	–	2	–	0	1	–	4	–	0
Tulane	0	–	2	–	0	0	–	4	–	1
Auburn	0	–	5	–	0	1	–	5	–	1
Cumberland (TN)			–					–
Nashville			–					–
+ – Conference co-champions

1906 Western Conference football standings
	Conf.					Overall
Team	W		L		T	W		L		T
Wisconsin +	3	–	0	–	0	5	–	0	–	0
Minnesota +	2	–	0	–	0	4	–	1	–	0
Michigan +	1	–	0	–	0	4	–	1	–	0
Chicago	3	–	1	–	0	4	–	1	–	0
Illinois	1	–	3	–	0	1	–	3	–	1
Iowa	0	–	1	–	0	2	–	3	–	0
Indiana	0	–	2	–	0	4	–	2	–	0
Purdue	0	–	3	–	0	0	–	5	–	0
+ – Conference co-champions

=== Independents ===
1906 Eastern college football independents records
	Conf.			Overall
Team	W	L	T	W		L		T
Princeton		–		9	–	0	–	1
Yale		–		9	–	0	–	1
Haverford		–		7	–	0	–	2
Harvard		–		10	–	1	–	0
Cornell		–		8	–	1	–	2
Lafayette		–		8	–	1	–	1
Penn State		–		8	–	1	–	1
Washington & Jefferson		–		9	–	2	–	0
Swarthmore		–		7	–	2	–	0
Drexel		–		6	–	2	–	0
Tufts		–		6	–	2	–	0
Penn		–		7	–	2	–	3
Carlisle		–		9	–	3	–	0
Brown		–		6	–	3	–	0
Rutgers		–		5	–	2	–	2
Dartmouth		–		6	–	3	–	1
Syracuse		–		6	–	3	–	0
Colgate		–		4	–	2	–	2
Vermont		–		5	–	4	–	0
Fordham		–		5	–	3	–	0
Western U. of Penn.		–		6	–	4	–	0
Holy Cross		–		4	–	3	–	1
Amherst		–		3	–	3	–	1
Lehigh		–		5	–	5	–	1
Bucknell		–		3	–	4	–	1
Dickinson		–		3	–	4	–	2
Carnegie Tech		–		2	–	3	–	2
Army		–		3	–	5	–	1
Franklin & Marshall		–		3	–	5	–	1
Wesleyan		–		2	–	4	–	1
New Hampshire		–		2	–	5	–	1
Villanova		–		3	–	7	–	0
Springfield Training School		–		1	–	5	–	3
NYU		–		0	–	4	–	0

1906 Midwestern college football independents records
	Conf.			Overall
Team	W	L	T	W		L		T
Saint Louis		–		11	–	0	–	0
North Dakota Agricultural		–		5	–	0	–	0
Butler		–		1	–	0	–	0
Michigan State Normal		–		5	–	0	–	1
Iowa State		–		9	–	1	–	0
Ohio		–		7	–	1	–	0
Notre Dame		–		6	–	1	–	0
St. Mary's (OH)		–		5	–	1	–	0
Fairmount		–		7	–	1	–	2
Wabash		–		5	–	1	–	1
South Dakota State		–		3	–	1	–	0
Kansas		–		7	–	2	–	2
Kansas State		–		5	–	2	–	0
Missouri		–		5	–	2	–	1
Detroit College		–		4	–	2	–	1
Northern Illinois State		–		4	–	2	–	1
Carthage		–		3	–	2	–	0
Lake Forest		–		3	–	2	–	0
Nebraska		–		6	–	4	–	0
Wittenberg		–		5	–	4	–	1
Heidelberg		–		3	–	3	–	1
Washington University		–		2	–	2	–	2
Beloit		–		3	–	4	–	1
Franklin		–		3	–	4	–	0
Doane		–		2	–	3	–	0
Shurtleff		–		2	–	4	–	2
Western State Normal		–		1	–	2	–	0
Mount Union		–		2	–	5	–	1
Drake		–		2	–	5	–	0
Haskell		–		2	–	5	–	0
Marquette		–		1	–	4	–	2
Chicago P&S		–		0	–	1	–	1
Cincinnati		–		0	–	7	–	2
Western Illinois		–		0	–	3	–	0

1906 Southern college football independents records
	Conf.			Overall
Team	W	L	T	W		L		T
The Citadel		–		3	–	0	–	0
Kendall		–		2	–	0	–	0
Catholic University		–		1	–	0	–	0
Georgetown		–		6	–	1	–	0
Texas A&M		–		6	–	1	–	0
Delaware		–		5	–	1	–	0
Navy		–		8	–	2	–	2
Southwestern Louisiana Industrial		–		1	–	0	–	1
Stetson		–		3	–	1	–	0
Virginia		–		7	–	2	–	2
Howard (AL)		–		6	–	2	–	1
Oklahoma		–		5	–	2	–	2
VPI		–		5	–	2	–	2
Kentucky State		–		4	–	3	–	0
Davidson		–		3	–	2	–	2
Florida		–		5	–	3	–	0
North Carolina A&M		–		3	–	1	–	4
Louisiana Industrial		–		2	–	1	–	3
West Virginia		–		5	–	5	–	0
George Washington		–		4	–	3	–	2
VMI		–		4	–	4	–	0
Grant		–		3	–	3	–	0
Arkansas		–		2	–	4	–	2
TCU		–		2	–	5	–	0
North Carolina		–		1	–	4	–	2
Oklahoma A&M		–		1	–	4	–	2
Roanoke		–		1	–	4	–	2
Rollins		–		1	–	3	–	0
Birmingham		–		0	–	2	–	1
Goldey College		–		0	–	3	–	0

1906 Western college football independents records
	Conf.			Overall
Team	W	L	T	W		L		T
Washington State		–		6	–	0	–	0
New Mexico A&M		–		4	–	0	–	0
Oregon		–		5	–	0	–	1
Colorado Mines		–		3	–	0	–	2
Utah		–		4	–	1	–	0
New Mexico		–		3	–	1	–	0
USC		–		2	–	0	–	2
Utah Agricultural		–		3	–	1	–	0
Oregon Agricultural		–		4	–	1	–	2
Washington		–		4	–	1	–	4
Wyoming		–		1	–	1	–	0
Idaho		–		2	–	4	–	0
Montana		–		2	–	4	–	0
Tempe Normal		–		0	–	2	–	0

=== Minor conferences ===
Conference	Champion(s)	Record
Michigan Intercollegiate Athletic Association	Olivet	4–0–1
Ohio Athletic Conference	Ohio State	3–0

=== Minor conference standings ===
1906 Ohio Athletic Conference football standings
	Conf.					Overall
Team	W		L		T	W		L		T
Ohio State $	3	–	0	–	0	8	–	1	–	0
Western Reserve	1	–	1	–	1	4	–	2	–	2
Ohio Wesleyan	1	–	1	–	2	3	–	3	–	3
Oberlin	1	–	1	–	3	1	–	3	–	3
Case	2	–	3	–	0	4	–	5	–	1
Kenyon	0	–	2	–	2	1	–	4	–	2
$ – Conference champion

== Awards and honors ==
=== All-Americans ===
The consensus All-America team included:

Position	Name	Height	Weight (lbs.)	Class	Hometown	Team
QB	Walter Eckersall	5'7"	141	Sr.	Chicago, Illinois	Chicago
QB	Edward Dillon			So.		Princeton
HB	William F. Knox			Jr.	Pittsburgh, Pennsylvania	Yale
HB	John W. Mayhew			So.		Brown
HB	Bill Hollenback	6'2"	184	So.	Blue Bell, Pennsylvania	Penn
FB	Paul Veeder			Sr.	Chicago, Illinois	Yale
E	Robert Forbes			Sr.		Yale
T	Lucius Horatio Biglow			Jr.	Morristown, New Jersey	Yale
T	Charles Osborne			Sr.		Harvard
G	Francis Burr			So.	Brookline, Massachusetts	Harvard
G	Gus Ziegler			Jr.		Penn
C	William Thomas Dunn			Sr.		Penn State
C	William Newman			Sr.		Cornell
G	Elmer Thompson			Jr.	Waterbury, Connecticut	Cornell
T	James Cooney			Jr.	Scranton, Pennsylvania	Princeton
E	Caspar Wister					Princeton

== See also ==
- 1906 College Football All-America Team
