= Clarence Kenney =

American football player and coach (1882–1950)

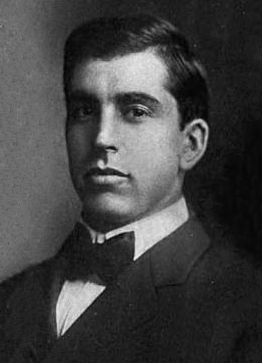

Biographical details
- Born: January 13, 1882; Mequon, Wisconsin, U.S.
- Died: November 28, 1950 (aged 68); Houma, Louisiana, U.S.

Playing career
- 1905–1906: Saint Louis
- Position: Halfback

Coaching career (HC unless noted)
- 1908: Creighton
- 1910: Marquette (assistant)
- 1912: Marquette

Head coaching record
- Overall: 6–7–2

Clarence John "Pike" Kenney (January 13, 1882 – November 28, 1950) was an American college football player and coach. He played college football at Marquette University before transferring as a medical student to the Saint Louis University. Kenney was an outstanding halfback and captain of the 1906 Saint Louis Blue and White football team when his teammate, Bradbury Robinson, completed the first legal forward pass to Jack Schneider in the history of American football on September 5 against Carroll in Waukesha, Wisconsin. Kenney served as head football coach at Creighton University in 1908, where his team went 3–3–2. He returned to Marquette in 1910 as an assistant coach and served as the head football coach there for one season in 1912, compiling a record of 3–4.

A native of Cedarburg, Wisconsin, Kenney served during World War I as a medical major in the 32nd Division of the United States Army. He died on November 28, 1950, in Houma, Louisiana, following a long illness.

== Head coaching record ==
Year	Team	Overall	Conference	Standing	Bowl/playoffs
Creighton Blue and White (Independent) (1908)
1908	Creighton	3–3–2			
Creighton:		3–3–2			
Marquette Blue and Gold (Independent) (1912)
1912	Marquette	3–4			
Marquette:		3–4			
Total:		6–7–2			
