= Halfback (American football) =

Offensive position in American football

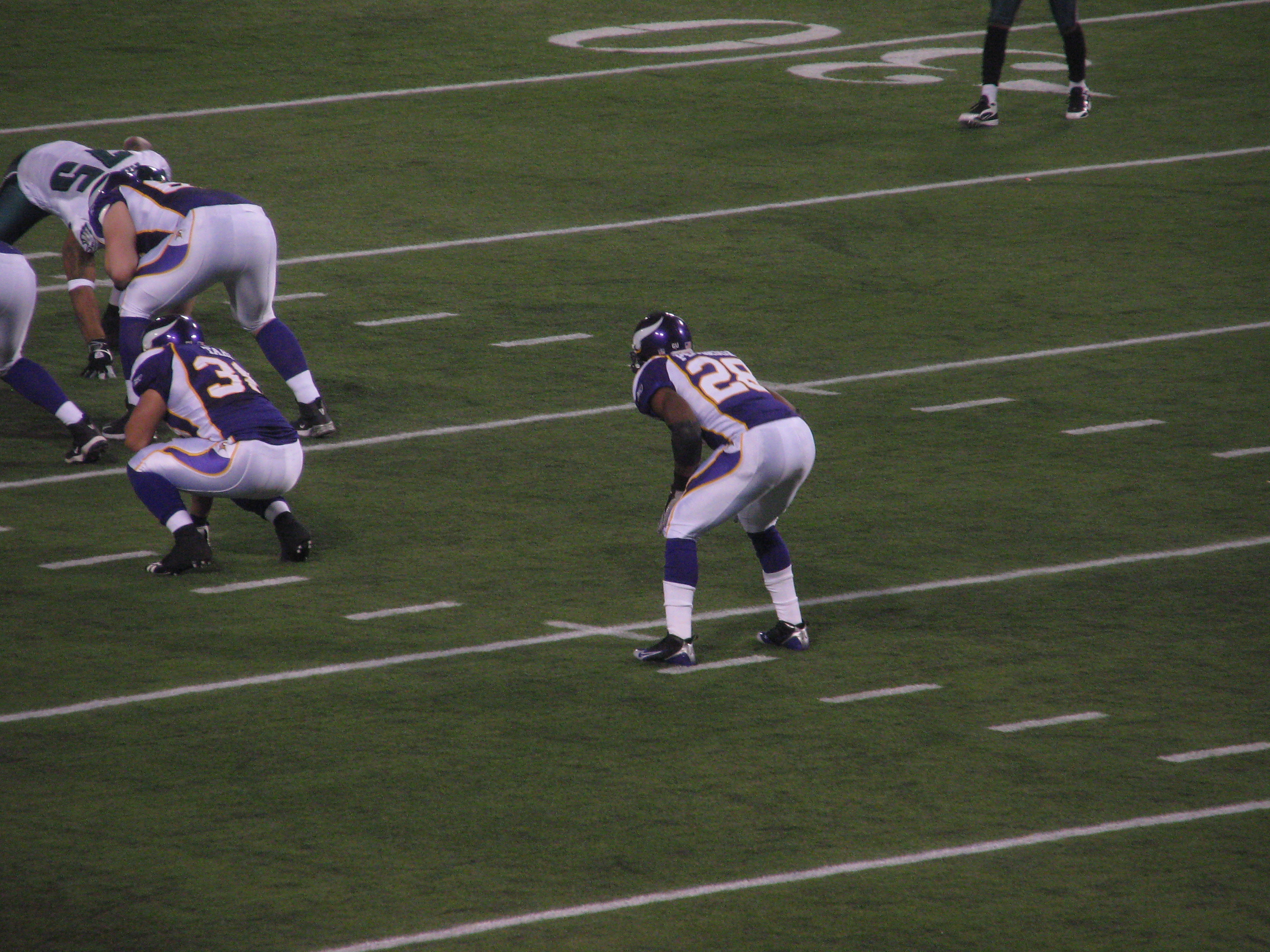
Adrian Peterson lined up at halfback

A halfback (HB) is an offensive position in American football, whose duties involve lining up in the offensive backfield and carrying the ball on most rushing plays, i.e. a running back. When the principal ball carrier lines up deep in the backfield, and especially when that player is placed behind another player (usually a blocking back), as in the I formation, that player is instead referred to as a tailback (TB).

Sometimes the halfback can catch the ball from the backfield on short passing plays as they are an eligible receiver. Occasionally, they line up as additional wide receivers. When not running or catching the ball, the primary responsibility of a halfback is to aid the offensive linemen in blocking, either to protect the quarterback or another player carrying the football.

The term "halfback" has seen a decline since the 2010s, with the advent of pass-oriented advanced and shotgun formations. Except for a small number of blocking specialists, it is usual to refer to this position as simply the running back.

== History ==
=== Overview ===
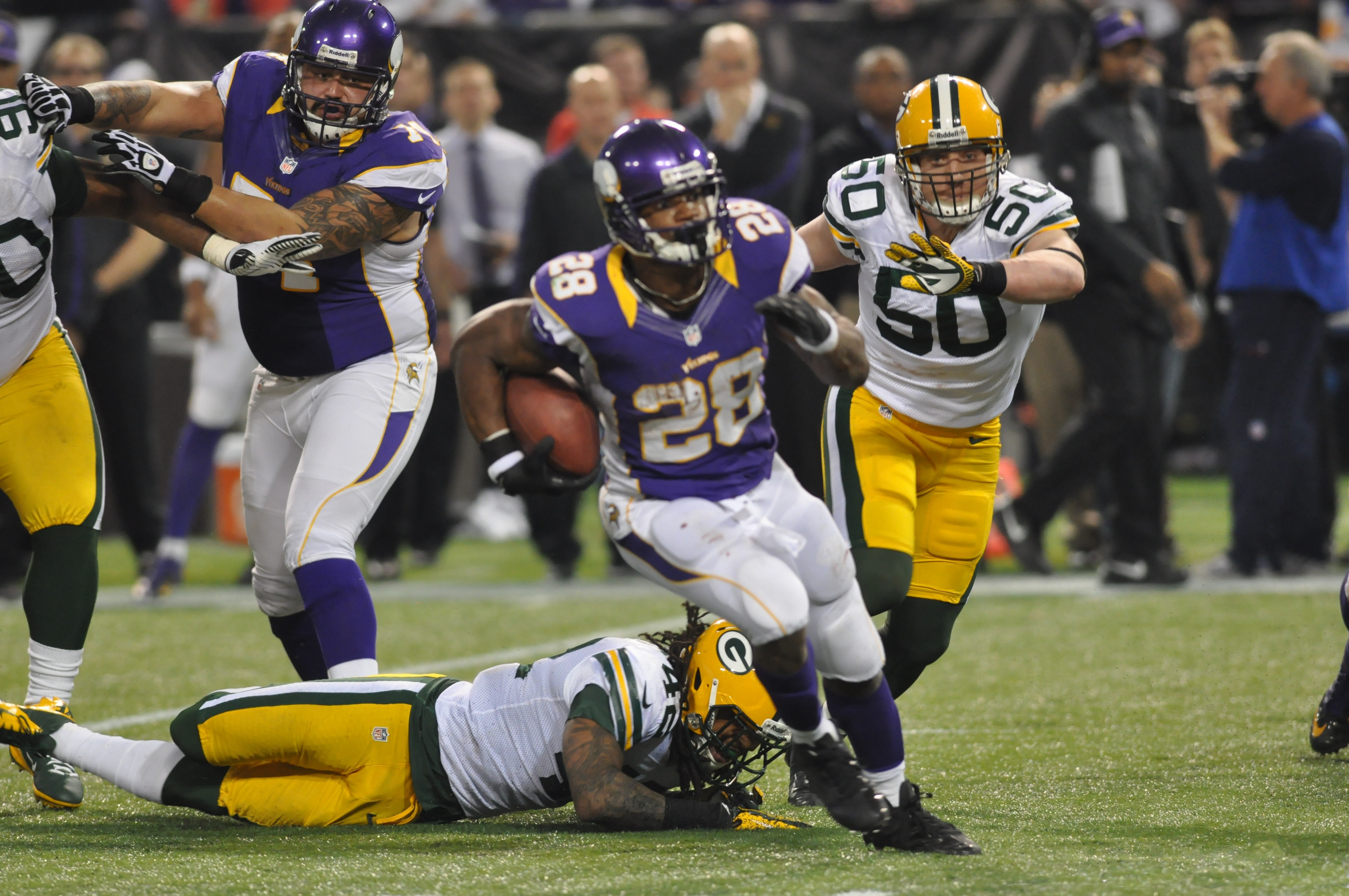
Adrian Peterson running with the ball

Before the emergence of the T formation in the 1940s, all members of the offensive backfield were legitimate threats to run or pass the ball. Most teams used four offensive backs on every play: a quarterback, two halfbacks, and a fullback. The quarterback began each play a quarter of the way back, the halfbacks began each play side by side and halfway back, and the fullback began each play the farthest back. Older systems require the halfback be proficient at throwing the ball downfield as well.

Now that most offensive formations have only one or two running backs, the original designations do not mean as much, as the fullback is now usually a lead blocker (technically a halfback), while the halfback or tailback (called such because they stand at the "tail" of the I) lines up behind the fullback. There has also been a shift in most offenses' dependence on halfbacks, as the quarterback is now generally considered the most essential part of a team. However, the average output of the halfback has not changed.

Historically, from the 1870s through the 1950s, before the introduction of the one-platoon system, the halfback position was both an offensive and defensive position. In the related sport of Canadian football, halfback is usually a defensive, rather than offensive, position since the 1980s. It is also used to refer to an offensive position similar to a slotback that could line up off the tight end or behind the quarterback.

Power was once the most desired trait in a halfback, but has been over taken by the need for a diverse skill set. Many of the "scat backs" in the modern era produce more total yards and touchdowns than their ancestor "power backs" by breaking off big plays on outside runs and receptions. In the past few decades the role of the halfback has gone through a great shift as most offensive game plans are now fueled by creativity and finesse instead of raw force. The spread offense and the hurry-up offense change the halfback's role but create more opportunity for these plays. Stamina and durability is more important than ever in the hurry-up offense. On the other hand, speed is often valued over strength, and pass-catching ability is sometimes valued over blocking proficiency.

The spread, the hurry-up, and the pro-style offenses dominate American football but the "smash-mouth" style of play is far from extinct. A power-running scheme is often utilized to counter an effective spread attack, as it allows a team to control the clock and keep the ball out of the opposing offense's control. This strategy is utilized in NFL, college, and all other forms of American football.

In the last few decades the running back's individual share of offensive output has declined as quarterbacks are generally treated as the cornerstone of an offense. The demands of an up-tempo offense also favor a multiple running back system.

While the timeline differs for individual players, running backs generally hit their peak between the ages of 22 and 28. A fantasy league study concluded in 2021 that about 84 percent of peak seasons fall within that range.

=== Smash mouth football ===
From the dawn of American football through the 1880s most offensive schemes focused on the running game. In a running based game plan the halfback was typically the cornerstone of the offense. This system focused on a physical run attack concentrated in the inside of the field, and therefore depended on a skilled "power back." There were no forward passes, and pure speed took a backseat to tackle-breaking and bucking ability. There was a focus on physicality over finesse, with this type of playing style earning the modern-day moniker "smash mouth" football.

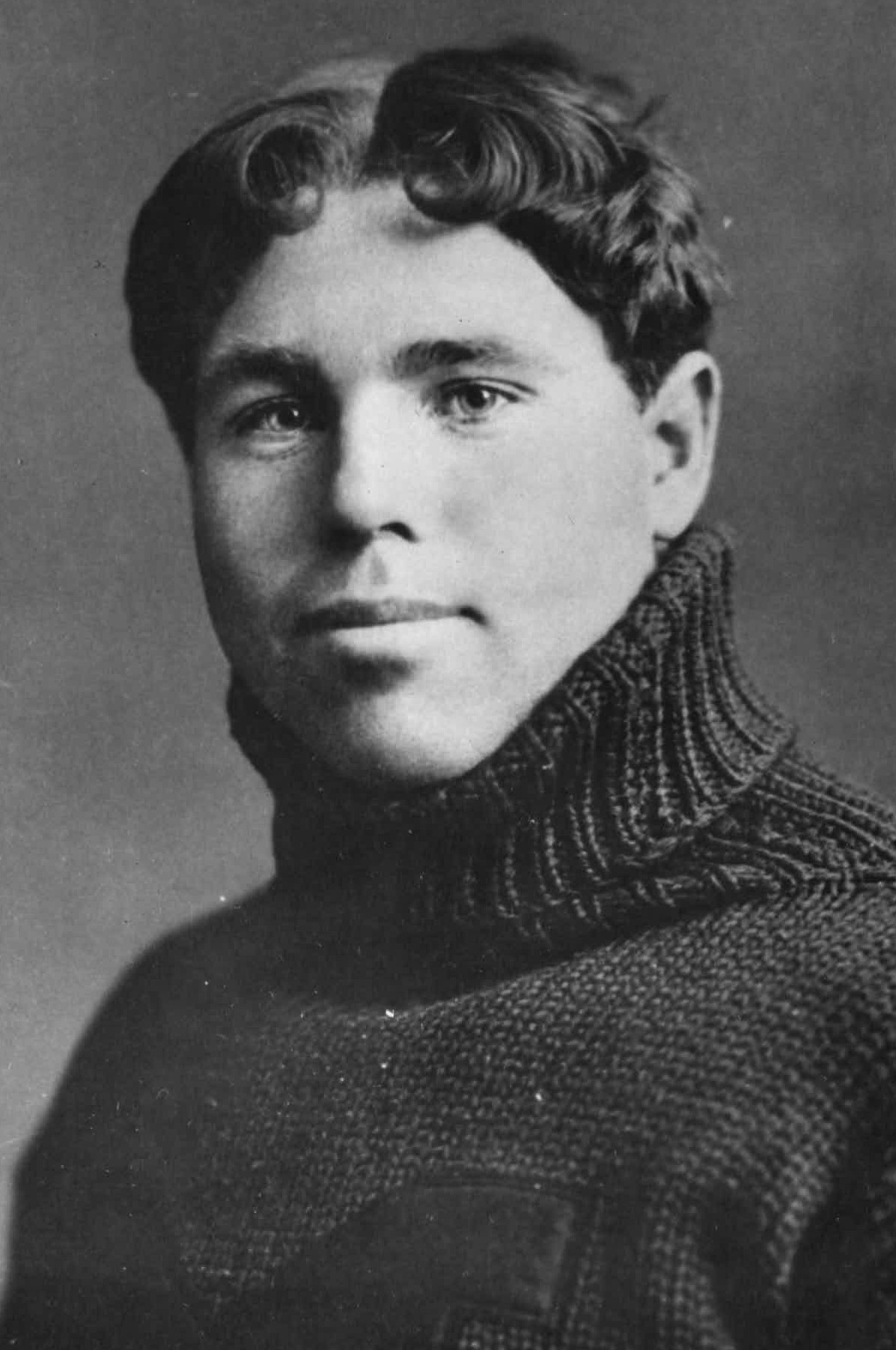
Willie Heston, a great early power back

Back Willie Heston of Fielding Yost's "point-a-minute" Michigan team has been acknowledged as the first to play at what later was designated as the tailback position on offense. Before Heston, left halfbacks ran plays in one direction, and right halfbacks ran plays in the other direction. Because of Heston's speed and agility, Yost placed Heston in the tailback position so that he could carry the ball on plays to either side of the line.

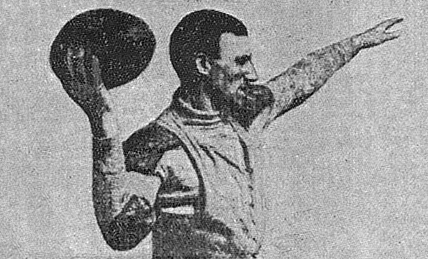
St. Louis University halfback Brad Robinson demonstrating "Overhand spiral—fingers on lacing".

Heston's charging ability and open-field running have also been credited with leading to the origin of the "seven man line and a diamond on defense." Minnesota's College Football Hall of Fame coaching staff of Henry L. Williams and Pudge Heffelfinger devised the strategy in 1903 to stop Heston. Minnesota had previously used the then-traditional nine-man line with the fullback backing up the line and a safety man down the field. Heffelfinger suggested that the halfbacks be pulled out of the line and stationed behind the tackles, thus requiring Heston to break through an initial seven-man line and a secondary line consisting of the fullback and two halfbacks. Known as the Minnesota shift, the formation became a standard practice. In 1936, Arch Ward credited Heston with leading to one of the "noteworthy transitions" in football history.

The sport's first triple threat, Bradbury Robinson of St. Louis University, ran, passed, received and punted out of the halfback position. It was as a halfback that Robinson threw the first legal forward pass to teammate Jack Schneider in a game at Carroll College on September 5, 1906. Halfback Jim Thorpe rushed for some 2,000 yards in 1912 as a member of the Carlisle Indians. In 1928, Ken Strong accounted for some 3,000 yards. Don Hutson, one of the sport's first great receivers, had his passes in college tossed by halfback Dixie Howell.

== Characteristics of a halfback ==
=== Running ===
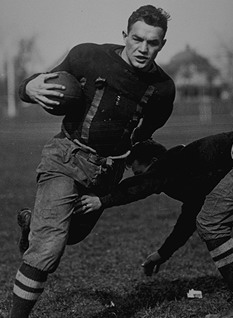
Ohio State halfback Chic Harley

The halfback needs good blocking from the offensive line and fullback to successfully gain yardage. Also, a halfback will generally have more rushing attempts than a receiver will have receptions. This is mainly because most teams have one primary halfback to receive most of the carries, while a passing game will be spread over a number of wide receivers, slot receivers, tight ends, and running backs. The ability to protect the football on the run is an important skill required of a running back. For an offense to succeed the ball has to be protected, and defensive attempts at stripping the ball will largely occur during runs on the inside of the playing field.

Halfbacks are expected to have good on-field "vision", allowing them to identify open rushing lanes and avoid tackles. Hall-of-Famer Emmitt Smith of the Dallas Cowboys and Le'Veon Bell of the Kansas City Chiefs, for example, are renowned for their patient running styles and ability to quickly identify lanes created by blockers, despite not being known for their speed.

=== Receiving ===
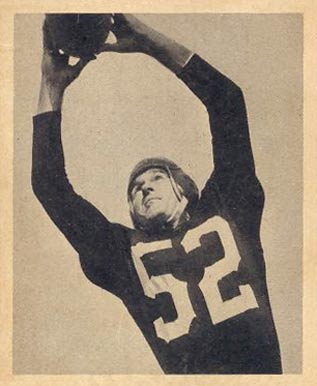
Harry Gilmer catching a football.

In addition to skill at running the ball, some halfbacks in the National Football League are known for their skill at catching passes. In the 1970s, Minnesota Vikings running back Chuck Foreman was one of the first halfbacks to establish himself as an elite threat in the receiving game. Foreman caught over 50 passes in four out of five seasons from 1974 to 1978, including a league leading 73 receptions in 1975. The role of the halfback as a receiver out of the backfield has expanded greatly in the NFL over the years, and a versatile halfback who provides his team with running and pass-catching abilities is highly valued. On passing plays, a halfback will often run a safe checkdown route, such as a hook or curl route, creating a safe target for a quarterback to throw to if all other receivers are covered. The increase in demand for halfbacks with good receiving abilities can be attributed to the rise in popularity of the West Coast offense and its variants, which often requires its halfbacks to catch passes on a regular basis. A great early example of a system that combined accomplished rushing skills with receiving ability is the offense of the San Francisco 49ers of the 1980s and 1990s under Bill Walsh and George Seifert. Their teams featured two Pro Bowl running backs who also had excellent receiving skills in Roger Craig and Ricky Watters. Craig became the first player in NFL history to both rush and receive more than 1,000 yards in a season. Currently Marshall Faulk is one of the top 20 pass catchers in NFL history. A good example of a dual threat running and pass-catching halfback is LaDainian Tomlinson; in 2003, while with the San Diego Chargers, Tomlinson rushed for 1,645 yards and caught 100 passes for 725 yards, giving him 2,370 total yards from the line of scrimmage, and he became the first NFL player ever to rush for over 1,000 yards and catch 100 passes in a season.

Some teams have a halfback who is more skilled at catching short passes than the starting halfback on the team, and/or is better at pass blocking or "picking up the blitz" than that of the other backs. Known as a "third down" back, he is often put in the game in third down and long situations where a pass is needed to pick up a first down. He can also be used to fool the defense by making them think he is being put into the game for a pass play, when the play is actually a run. Darren Sproles was one of the most prominent examples of a "third down" back. While never considered a workhorse back partly due to his diminutive 5'6" stature, Sproles was effective due to his elusiveness and ability to catch and block, enjoying a 14-year career with over 4,800 career receiving yards as a result. Recent examples of these third down backs include Nyheim Hines of the Buffalo Bills, Eno Benjamin of the Arizona Cardinals, J.D. McKissic of the Washington Commanders and Jerick McKinnon of the Kansas City Chiefs.

=== Blocking ===
Halfbacks are also required to help the offensive line in passing situations, and, in the case of the fullback, running plays. Halfbacks will often block blitzing linebackers or safeties on passing plays when the offensive line is occupied with the defensive linemen. On running plays, the fullback will often attempt to create a hole in the defensive line for the halfback to run through. Effective blocking backs are usually key components for a running back's success (as seen in LaDainian Tomlinson record-breaking season in 2006).

=== Physical characteristics ===
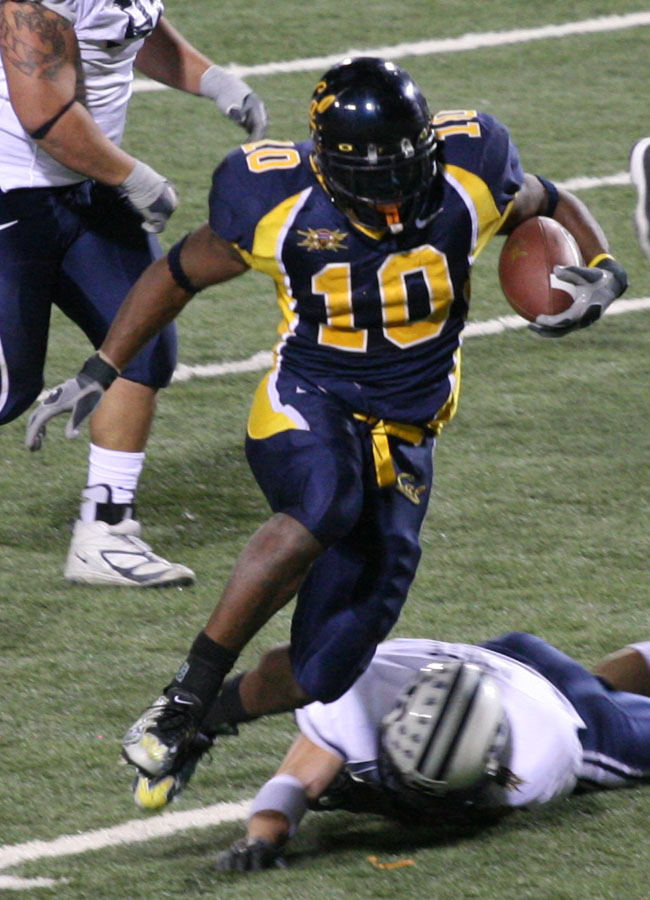
Cal halfback Marshawn Lynch.

There is a great diversity in those who play at the running back position. At one extreme are smaller, faster players. These fast, agile, and elusive running backs are often called "scat backs" because their low center of gravity and maneuverability allow them to dodge tacklers. Hall-of-famer Barry Sanders, Chris Johnson, and LeSean McCoy exemplified this running style. "Scat backs" still active in the NFL include Saquon Barkley of the Philadelphia Eagles, D'Andre Swift of the Chicago Bears, Christian McCaffrey of the San Francisco 49ers and Alvin Kamara of the New Orleans Saints. This type of running back has grown in demand due to changes in offensive play calling, style, and tempo. The trending spread offense demands a player that can utilize open space as much as possible as run blockers are sacrificed to spread out the defense.

At the other extreme are "power backs": bigger, stronger players who can break through tackles using brute strength and raw power. They are usually (but not always) slower runners compared to other backs, and typically run straight ahead (or "North-and-South" in football terminology) rather than dodging to the outside edges of the playing field (i.e. running "East-and-West") like shorter, quicker, lighter backs will often do. Power backs from previous generations such as Jim Brown and Larry Csonka were often classified as fullbacks, but halfbacks such as Jerome Bettis, Brandon Jacobs and Steven Jackson also exemplify the power back position. More recent examples include Marshawn Lynch, Frank Gore, Leonard Fournette, Nick Chubb of the Houston Texans and Derrick Henry of the Baltimore Ravens. For many years the “power” running back was the central component of an offense. In that time period formations and rhythm favored this type of player. This sort of offensive scheme is now a rarity, as “power backs” take on supporting roles behind faster and more versatile running backs.

In the modern age, an “every-down” halfback has to have a combination of running ability, pass-catching ability, and blocking ability. The "every-down" designation comes from a running back's ability to perform important functions beyond rushing on the ever-increasing number of passing plays such as receiving the ball and pass-blocking for their quarterback. A primary running back also needs abundant stamina to remain consistent in an up-tempo offense. Backs such as Walter Payton and Emmitt Smith were appraised for their versatile running styles and abilities. More recent examples include Dalvin Cook of the Minnesota Vikings, Jonathan Taylor of the Indianapolis Colts and Melvin Gordon of the Denver Broncos.

=== Goal line backs ===
Many teams also have a halfback designated as a "goal line back" or "short yardage specialist". This halfback comes into the game in short yardage situations when the offense needs only one to five yards to get a first down. They also come into the game when the offense nears the goal-line. Normally when an offense gets inside the 5-yard line they send in their goal-line formation which usually includes eight blockers, a quarterback, a halfback, and a fullback. The closer they are to the goal-line the more likely they are to use this formation. If a certain halfback is used often near the goal-line he is called the goal-line back. Short yardage and goal-line backs are usually larger power backs that are not prone to fumbling. Their job is to get the first down or touchdown by muscling through or pushing a large mass of players that are being blocked without dropping the ball.

=== Special teams ===
A halfback might be called upon to return punts and kickoffs on special teams. Although this is most often done by wide receivers and defensive backs, such as cornerbacks (because they are generally the fastest players on the team), some halfbacks have enough speed and talent to perform this role. The NFL's current all-time leading in kickoff return yards (14,014 yards) and punt return yards (4,999) by a halfback is Brian Mitchell. He also gained 1,967 rushing yards, 2,336 receiving yards, and 15 fumble return yards, giving him a total of 23,330 all-purpose yards, the second most in NFL history behind Jerry Rice. A halfback, typically a back-up, can also play upback, which is a blocking back who lines up approximately 1–3 yards behind the line of scrimmage in punting situations and usually receive snaps on a fake punt.

=== Passing ===
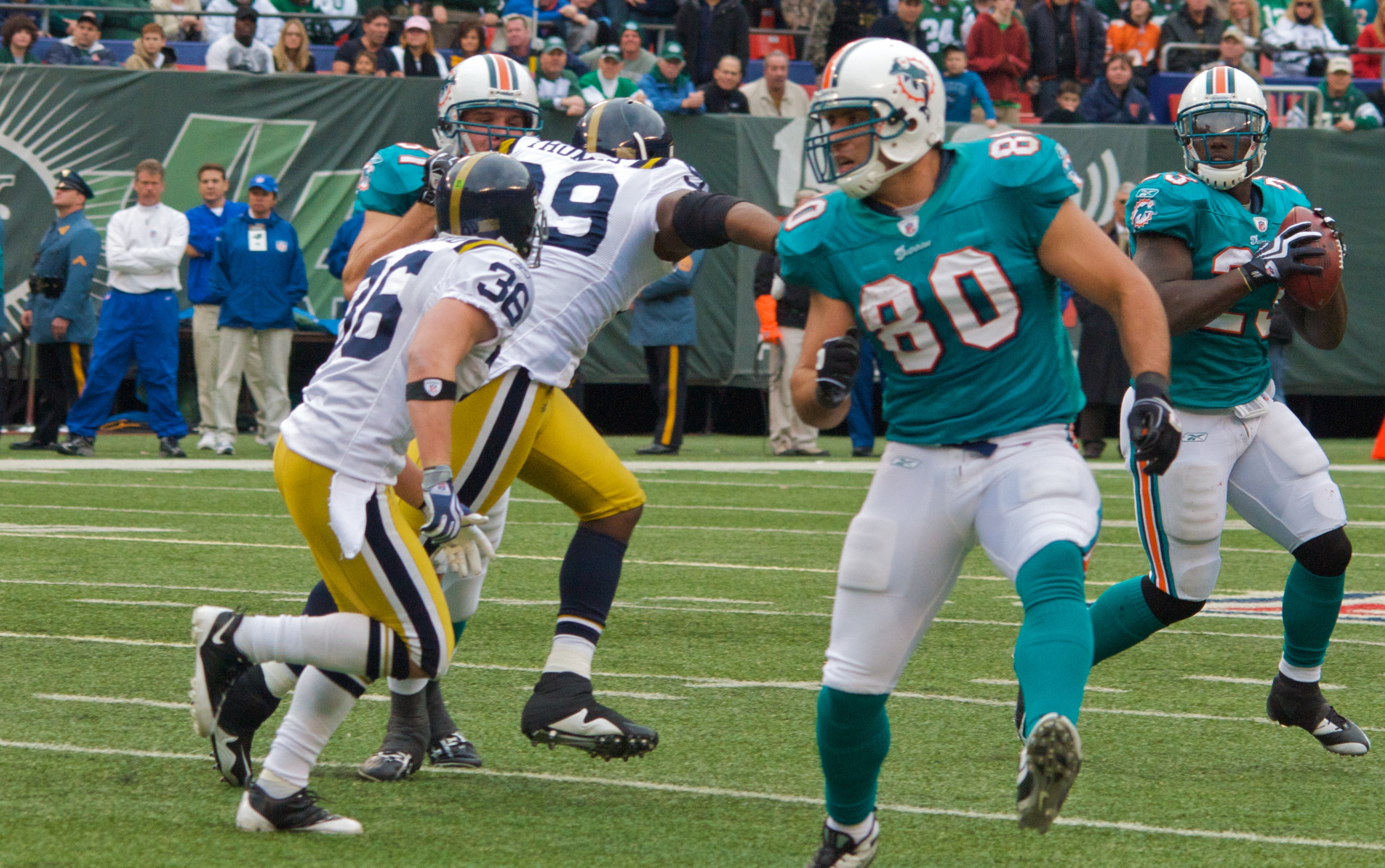
Halfback Ronnie Brown throwing out of the Wildcat formation

On rare occasions, and more often in the early days of the sport, a halfback is asked to throw the ball when executing a halfback option. This play is generally referred to as a halfback pass, regardless if the player throwing the football is a tailback or fullback. This play is risky because most halfbacks are inexperienced passers, and so it is often run only by certain halfbacks more skilled at passing than most. The halfback can also throw the ball while running a direct snap play where the center snaps the ball to halfback directly. This has become particular in teams that use the Wildcat formation, most prominently the Miami Dolphins, where running back Ronnie Brown would run, pass, and receive out of this set.

== See also ==
- Change of pace running back
- Halfback (Canadian football)
