= Bradbury Robinson =

American football player and physician (1884–1949)

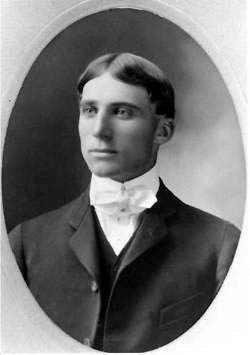
- Robinson during his years as a student

Biographical details
- Born: February 1, 1884; Bellevue, Ohio, U.S.
- Died: March 7, 1949 (aged 65); Pinellas County, Florida, U.S.

Playing career
- 1903: Wisconsin
- 1904–1907: Saint Louis
- Positions: Halfback, end, punter (first triple threat)

Coaching career (HC unless noted)
- 1908: Saint Louis (assistant)

Bradbury Norton Robinson Jr. (February 1, 1884 – March 7, 1949) was a pioneering American football player, physician, nutritionist, conservationist and local politician. He played college football at the University of Wisconsin in 1903 and at Saint Louis University from 1904 to 1907. In 1904, through personal connections to Wisconsin governor Robert M. La Follette, Sr. and his wife, Belle Case, Robinson learned of calls for reforms to the game of football from President Theodore Roosevelt, and began to develop tactics for passing. After moving to Saint Louis University, Robinson was credited as throwing the first legal forward pass in the history of American football on September 26, 1906, at a game at Carroll College in Waukesha, Wisconsin. However, in 2026, it was discovered that on September 22, 1906, Bates College sophomore quarterback Stephen Cobb completed the first legal forward pass in college football history, connecting with freshman Ralph Cummings. Robinson became the sport's first triple threat man, excelling at running, passing, and kicking. He was also a member of St. Louis' "Olympic World's Champions" football team in 1904.

Robinson graduated from Saint Louis University in 1908 with a medical degree and practiced as a surgeon at the Mayo Clinic in Rochester, Minnesota.

In World War I, he was commissioned a captain of infantry in the U.S. Army, arriving in France in 1918 where he became an instructor in the use of the newly developed tank, later serving as a front line infantry officer in the last ten days of the war.

He returned to France after the war to study advanced medical techniques at the University of Bordeaux. In the early 1920s, he oversaw the medical screening of immigrants while serving on the European staff of Hugh S. Cumming, Surgeon General of the United States.

He returned to the United States in 1926 and practiced medicine in St. Louis, Michigan, where he was twice elected the city's mayor.

In the 1940s, Robinson was among the first to warn against the dangers of DDT use in agriculture.

== Early life ==
After Robinson's birth in Bellevue, Ohio and while still a toddler, his family moved to St. Louis, Missouri where Robinson's father, Bradbury Norton Robinson, became general baggage agent for the Missouri–Kansas–Texas Railroad. The senior Robinson spent most of his adult life working for railroads. Born in Lowell, Massachusetts, he served one year as a sergeant in Company C of the 6th Massachusetts Infantry at the opening of the Civil War. During the Baltimore Riot of April 19, 1861, one week after Fort Sumter, the 6th Massachusetts became the first Union unit to take casualties in action. After his discharge, he moved his family to Missouri in 1862 to participate in the construction of the Missouri Pacific Railroad from St. Louis to Kansas City.

The younger Robinson was three years old when the family moved again in 1887 to Baraboo, Wisconsin, to be near his mother's family. Amelia Isabella (née Lee) was born in London, England and moved with her parents to the Baraboo area in 1878. She married the senior Robinson at her parents' farm in Merrimack, Wisconsin, some 11 miles from Baraboo, in June 1881. Her husband served as Baraboo City Marshal from 1903 to 1904. The Marshal's office was the predecessor to the city's police department.

Brad Jr. and his sisters, Jennie and Nellie, grew up on the Robinsons' small farm across from the Sauk County Fairgrounds. He attended Baraboo public schools and graduated from high school in 1902. Robinson later joked that Baraboo was "made famous by the Ringling Brothers Circus ... and myself." The Circus was founded the same year that Robinson was born.

He was a first cousin four times removed of Bradbury Robinson (1752–1801), who fought for the patriots at Concord in 1775. Generations of Robinson descendants have included males named "Bradbury" in honor of the Concord minuteman.

== 1903: Freshman "star" at Wisconsin ==
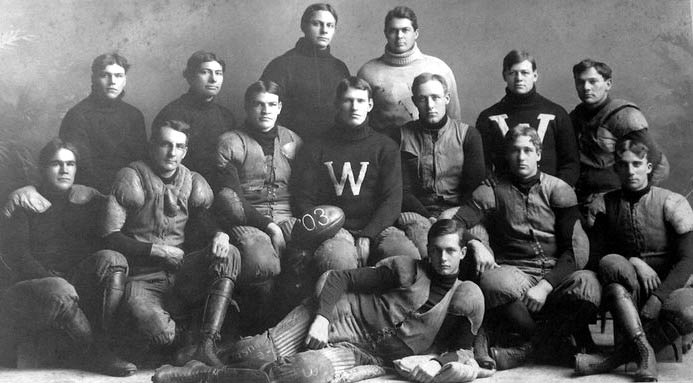
1903 Wisconsin Badger football team; Robinson is on front row, first from right

Robinson enrolled at the University of Wisconsin and played for the Badgers varsity team as a freshman in the 1903 season. His arrival was seen by a sports reporter at the time as something of a godsend. Writing on August 23, 1903, the unidentified journalist reported:

... a temporary disappointment, the information that O'Brien, the best candidate for the place of Center Remp, had decided not to return to the university, but had accepted a place for $500 to coach the Appleton high school eleven. The disappointment was cured, however, by the announcement that Robinson, who weighs nearly 200 pounds, had resigned his place at the state insane asylum at Mendota [now part of Madison, Wisconsin] and would enter the football squad in perfect trim, having systematically trained for the past six weeks.

In Robinson's first and only season at Madison, "the Cardinal team" under Arthur Hale Curtis went 6–3–1, suffering shut-out losses to rivals Minnesota and Michigan. Robinson did get a chance to shine in the Badgers' 87–0 defeat of Beloit on October 17, when he scored two touchdowns. A newspaperman wrote, "Robinson's star work seems to show [the] second eleven is not far behind the first."

== Spring and summer 1904: The origins of the forward pass ==
=== The political roots of the pass ===
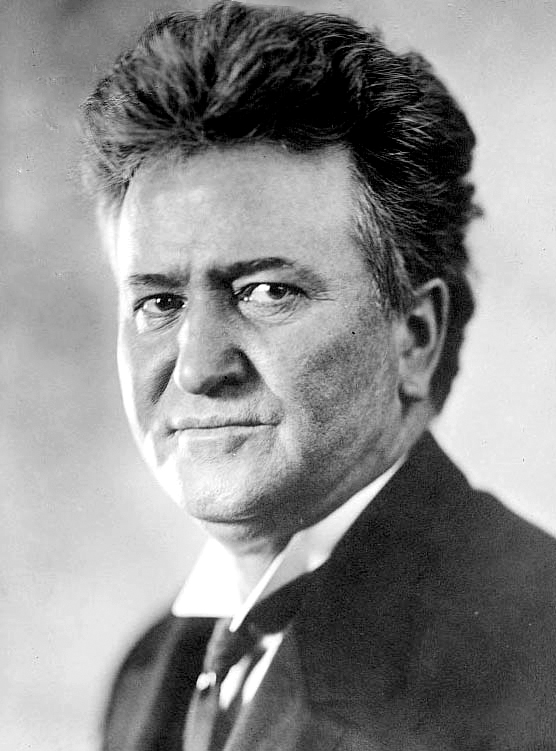
Governor of Wisconsin, Robert M. La Follette showed Robinson his concern about the injuries in football. In reply, Robinson suggested him some modifications to the rules

In addition to the Ringling brothers and Robinson, another notable person from Baraboo, Wisconsin, was Belle Case (1859–1931). The suffragette and attorney was, according to The New York Times at the time of her death, "probably the least known yet most influential of all the American women who had to do with public affairs in this country". She taught high school in Baraboo before marrying future Wisconsin Congressman, Senator, Governor and Presidential candidate Robert M. La Follette. Belle La Follette played an active role in her husband's political career.

In the spring of 1904, Robinson was summoned by Governor La Follette to the Executive Mansion, which was just a short walk from the U of W campus. In a February 5, 1946, interview with the St. Louis Post-Dispatch's Robert Morrison, Robinson recalled that the Governor's "wife was from my home town and our families were acquainted ... So at the university football practices, where La Follette used to come occasionally, he would often stop to talk to me."

Even so, Robinson was puzzled by the Governor's invitation until, "he showed me a letter from Teddy Roosevelt. There had been a lot of injuries in football and a movement was afoot to abolish the game. Roosevelt wrote that he did not want it wiped out and he thought it was an excellent game for character building, so La Follette asked me 'what do you think can be done to spread the game out and soften it up a bit?'"

Writing in his memoirs, Robinson remembered suggesting "increasing the distance to be gained in a set number of downs, to develop the kicking angle and introducing some of the elements of basketball and English Rugby; with perhaps allowing the throwing of the ball forward."

Sometime later, Robinson "met with the Governor and he told me to develop handling and throwing the ball because he was sure that eventually there would be changes in the rules along that line."

=== Robinson learns to pass ===
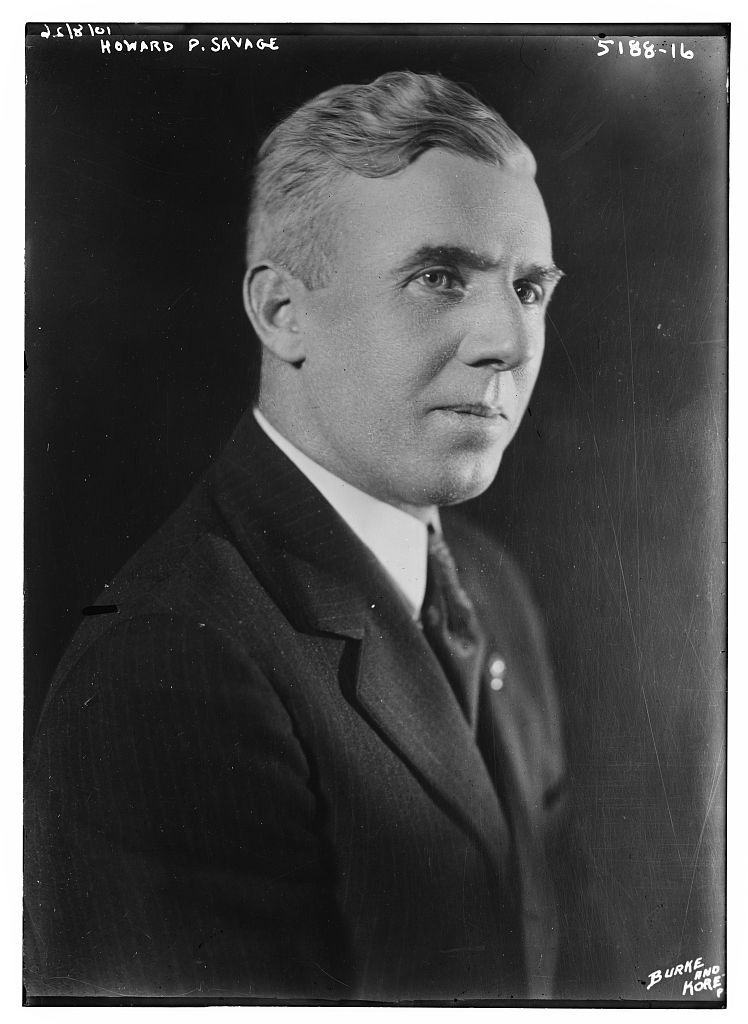
H.P. Savage, who instructed Robinson in the art of passing

It was in the preseason of 1904 that Robinson first completely recognized the potential of the pass. Robinson later wrote:

... there came to the Wisconsin U squad a tall young Irishman from Chicago. His name was H.P. Savage, the same who later ... became the National Commander of the American Legion and was known as "High Power" Savage. They were trying to develop me into a kicker at Wisconsin and H.P. generally teamed up with me to catch my punts. I noticed that he could throw my punts back almost as far as I could kick them. Here was the trick I must learn. I got H.P. to show me how he did it.

Twenty-five years later, Robinson told St. Louis Star-Times sports editor Sid Keener (1888–1981) that Savage threw "the pigskin to his players with the ball revolving as it sailed through the air. "From then on," Robinson wrote in his memoirs, "my football hobby became forward passing or anyway passing the ball."

A short time after Savage instructed him in the art of throwing a spiral, Robinson got in a fight with the "school bully" and was dismissed from the Wisconsin football team. Robinson wrote that the incident occurred in the locker room after a practice in which the bully roughly blindsided a teammate. Robinson warned the miscreant not to repeat such unsportsmanlike play. The bully responded by sucker punching Robinson, who defended himself with enthusiasm.

At that moment, according to Robinson's memoirs, a coach arrived on the scene and incorrectly identified Robinson as the aggressor and dismissed him on the spot. His teammates later explained the situation to the coach, who withdrew the dismissal but refused to give Robinson the apology he demanded.

== 1904: Transfer to St. Louis, the Olympics and a perfect, unscored upon season ==
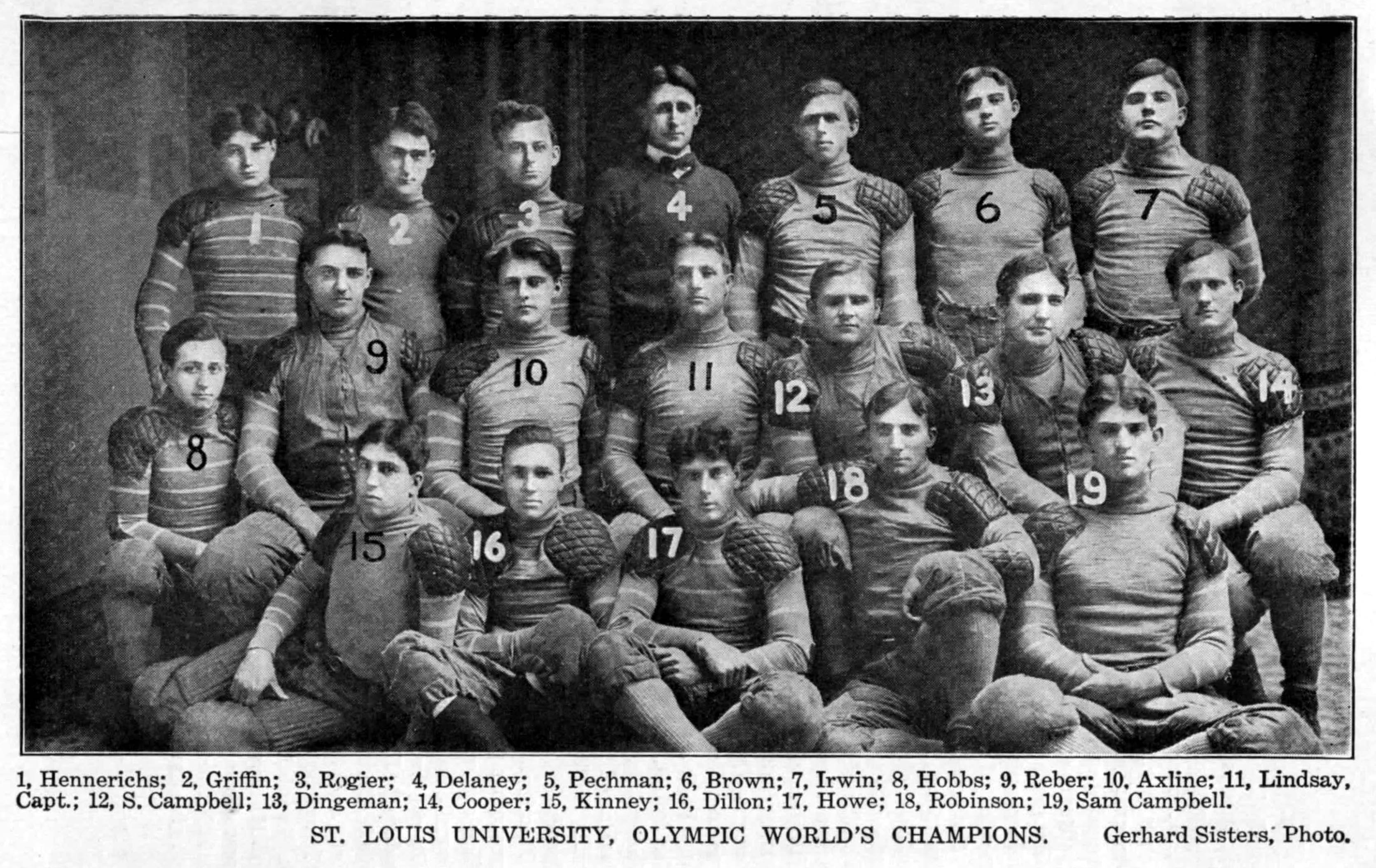
St. Louis University's 1904 "Olympic World's Champions", from the Spalding's Official Foot Ball Guide for 1905

Absent the apology, as a matter of honor, Robinson chose to leave Wisconsin, enrolling as a medical student at the Jesuit Saint Louis University, where he played the 1904 season, although he sat out many games with a broken shoulder blade. More than half the St. Louis squad consisted of future medical doctors.

Soon after arriving in St. Louis, Robinson met 31-year-old sportswriter Ed Wray, beginning a professional friendship that would last for the rest of Robinson's life. Wray was sports editor of the St. Louis Globe-Democrat from 1904 to 1908, which encompassed all of Robinson's playing years. Wray left that post to rejoin the staff at the rival St. Louis Post-Dispatch, where he had worked as a sports reporter from 1900 to 1904. He remained at that paper as a sports editor and columnist until his retirement in 1955. As an eyewitness to what he considered football history, Wray wrote extensively about Robinson and the development of the forward pass, both contemporaneously and in retrospective columns published over the next four decades.

David C. Todd, an instructor at the SLU Medical Department, served as an official for most St. Louis area games of the period. He remembered that, "Robinson spoke to me about the pass the fall he joined St. Louis University (1904)." Wray described Todd as "a factor in St. Louis University athletic circles" who, along with SLU athletic director Father Pat Burke, set out to build up the football program at St. Louis in the early 20th century. In an interview with Wray, Todd remembered that Robinson, "came to me and told me he thought the forward pass was going to be a great asset. He told me that he had tried it and found he could throw the ball like he could a baseball. I spoke to Father Burke about it in the presence of one of your reporters, also named Burke (the late Miles Joseph Burke), and he was interested."

St. Louis (under head coach Martin J. Delaney) went 11–0 in 1904, outscoring its opponents 336 to 0 that year—including a win over Kentucky by the score of 5–0, the 17–0 victory over Missouri and a 51–0 defeat of Arkansas.

Some argue that St. Louis University won the Olympic gold medal in American football in 1904, with the sport being featured in the demonstration programme.

Both the third Olympic Games of the modern era and the World's Fair were held in St. Louis – and Blue and White games were played before Exposition crowds. The Spalding Athletic Almanac of 1905 offered this commentary:

The (Olympic) Department knew perfectly well that it would be unable to have an Olympic Foot Ball Championship, though it felt incumbent to advertise it. Owing to the conditions in American colleges it would be utterly impossible to have an Olympic foot ball championship decided. The only college that seemed absolutely willing to give up its financial interests to play for the World's Fair Championship was the St. Louis University and there is more apparently in this honor than appears in this report. There were many exhibition contests held in the Stadium under the auspices of the Department wherein teams from the St. Louis University and Washington University took part and competed against other teams from universities east and west of the Mississippi River. The Missouri–Purdue game was played in the Stadium on October 28 ... The Olympic College Foot Ball Championship was won by St. Louis University, St. Louis, Mo., by default.

== 1905 season ==
Former St. Louis Brown Tommy Dowd coached SLU in 1905

Long after transferring to St. Louis, Robinson maintained an unusually close relationship with his former team. He almost convinced the Badgers to make a last minute alteration to their schedule to play an extra game in 1905 ... at St. Louis on December 2. The so-called "post-season" game was announced as all but a done deal by Post-Dispatch writer J. B. Sheridan. Sheridan quoted St. Louis' Father Burke as saying, "Robinson, our crack halfback, who played with Wisconsin two years ago, is chiefly responsible for Wisconsin's willingness to play here. He is in close touch with the athletic authorities at the Madison school and, knowing of their desire to play one more game this season, arranged the contest with St. Louis University." 1905 St. Louis Coach Tommy Dowd said in the same article that the game was not "definitely arranged" and, in fact, it never happened.

Dowd coached the Blue and White to what was a disappointing 7–2 record in 1905, which led alumni to offer Dowd's predecessor, Martin Delaney, more than twice his previous salary, if he would return to St. Louis. But fate, and Robinson, had other plans.

== Eddie Cochems ==
A photograph of Eddie Cochems from a page of Brad Robinson's scrapbook. Robinson has written: "Coach St L. U '06-'07-'08 A really great Football Coach + Player. He is truly the father of the new game."

Each preseason, back home in Wisconsin, Robinson was invited to work out with the Badgers and the development of the pass and possible pass plays continued at that venue. It was at Wisconsin between the 1904 and 1905 seasons that Robinson first met Eddie Cochems, who had become an assistant coach with the Badgers under Curtis in 1904 before spending the 1905 season as the head coach at Clemson. Robinson recalled, "What I saw at Wisconsin before returning to St. Louis to school convinced me that Edward B. Cochems had an outstanding football system for that time. Actually years ahead of most of the other coaches of that period."

According to Frank Acker, Robinson's teammate both at Wisconsin and later at St. Louis, Cochems had also spent the 1904 season preparing for the legalization of the forward pass.

An unidentified St. Louis sportswriter of the period reported that some feared Robinson might return to Wisconsin to play with Cochems there. "(Robinson) played with Wisconsin two years ago, and might have filled one of the positions in the back field this year if he had not promised to return to the St. Louis University. "He received several requests from Phil King (who had resumed his position as Wisconsin's head coach) to return to Madison and play on the Badgers, but would not desert his teammates in St. Louis."

Robinson simply could not break his word. So, if he wanted to play in Cochems' "outstanding football system", Robinson would have to bring the 29-year-old coach to St. Louis ... so that is exactly what he set out to do.

== 1906: The forward pass is legalized and Cochems is hired by SLU ==
The pass was officially legalized in the spring of 1906 by the newly created Intercollegiate Athletic Association of the United States (IAAUS), which became the NCAA in 1910. This was part of the plan to make the game safer that had been undertaken at the behest of President Roosevelt. Robinson wrote:

After the season of 1905 was over the Rules Committee put the forward pass and several other things in the rules. This is what I had been waiting for since 1904. I induced my school to hire Mr. Edward B. Cochems to come to St. Louis as coach. He brought with him 3 or 4 outstanding players. With them and what we already had at St. Louis U he developed the team sensation of the country for the two seasons of 1906 and 1907.

"It was chiefly through Robinson that Cochems, the assistant coach at Wisconsin last year, was engaged by St. Louis University," a newspaper at the time confirmed. "(Robinson) recommended him to the faculty."

To prepare for the first season under the new rules, Cochems convinced the university to allow him to take his team to a Jesuit sanctuary at Lake Beulah in southern Wisconsin for "the sole purpose of studying and developing the pass." Newbery Medal winning author Harold Keith wrote in Esquire magazine that, in August 1906, Lake Beulah became the birthplace of "the first, forward pass system ever devised."

== The first pass ==
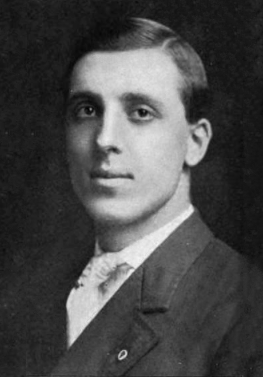
Jack Schneider, receiver of the first Robinson pass, c. 1909

Some 20 miles from the Lake Beulah training camp, on September 26, 1906, Robinson threw the first pass in a game against Carroll College at Waukesha, Wisconsin. Jack Schneider was the receiver for the Blue & White (St. Louis would not adopt "Billikens" as a nickname for its sports teams until sometime after 1910).

According to archives at St. Louis, Cochems (pronounced coke-ems) didn't start calling pass plays in the Carroll game until after he had grown frustrated with the failure of his offense to move the ball on the ground.

The first Robinson-to-Schneider attempt failed to connect. More than 100 years later, Stephen Jones of The Press-Enterprise called it "an incompletion that changed the game of football forever." Under the rules at that time, an incomplete pass resulted in a turnover to Carroll.

Undeterred, on a subsequent possession, Cochems called for his team to again execute the play he dubbed the "air attack". Robinson took the fat, rugby-style ball and threw a 20-yard touchdown pass to Schneider. Interviewed in a Jacksonville, Florida hospital room in 1956, Schneider remembered that first pass reception 50 years earlier.

We were in the second half and the game was tied when Robinson called the pass. Actually Robinson was an end and I was a fullback. But Brad could throw the ball a long way, so we switched positions for that one play. We were told to run after the snap and just keep going until we heard the passer yell 'hike' or our name. So, I ran and ran. I was about to give up when I heard Robinson call. I turned and caught the ball a yard or so short of the goal and went over with it.

The play stunned the fans and the Carroll players. St. Louis went on to win, 22–0.

However, in 2026, it was discovered that on September 22, 1906, Bates College sophomore quarterback Stephen Cobb completed the first forward pass in college football history, connecting with freshman Ralph Cummings.

== Taking full advantage of the new rules ==
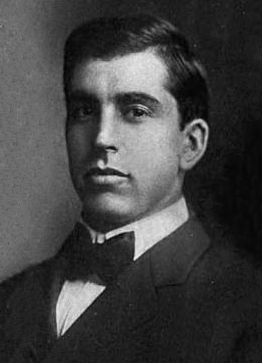
SLU Captain "Pike" Kenney c. 1909

The 1906 Blue & White squad built its offensive strategy around "the new rules."

After returning to St. Louis, Cochems drilled his players relentlessly in long evening practice sessions "behind closed gates ... in absolute secrecy" according to one contemporary newspaper account. Robinson and the tall and speedy Schneider practiced running "pass routes." Their passes were not the awkward heaves typical of the era, but overhand spirals that hit the receiver in stride. They invented their own drills to develop the new skills they would need. Todd recalled, "Pike Kenney, Robinson and Schneider got together and began to work on the pass and soon developed amazing proficiency. Robinson and Schneider used to run the side lines throwing the ball clear across the field as they ran."

"Another Cochemesque feature of the practice," according to columnist Dan Dillon, "was his placing his two star forward pass artists — Robinson and Schneider — in front of the big score board in center field (at Sportsman's Park)." Writing on October 24, 1906, Dillon was astonished that the pair "actually pitch the oval much after [the] baseball idea at certain marked spots on the board. The accuracy exhibited by those men in throwing the ball was simply marvelous and if some of the Eastern critics who are reputed opposed to the baseball throw for the forward pass could see this pair execute the play it is certain they would change their views."

Frank Acker, who had moved from Wisconsin to St. Louis with Cochems and Schneider, explained the impact of the 1906 rules in an interview with Wray published in September 1945:

The passer then had to run five yards to the right or left of center before passing and as a result the field was marked off in five-yard squares, like a checker board, and not merely with parallel lines 10 yards apart.

The most important difference in the rules was that an incomplete forward pass was not brought back to the point of origin, but went to the enemy at the point where it grounded. The effect was, on the fourth down, the same as if the ball had been punted.

If the St. Louis U. receiver caught it, he could run for that touchdown. If he muffed, the ball went to the foe some 40 yards or more from the point it was thrown ... Wouldn't that do things, today?

By the time of the interview, Acker was, according to Wray, "a stocky, broad-shouldered 59-year old guy", a retired Southern California physician and real estate investor. But even 39 years distant, the memories of those early days of college football were fresh.

Robinson threw the long passes and Schneider the bullet-fast short ones. Robbie's shots were so dangerous that the opposition assigned three men to take care of him.

We ran our plays from the T formation ... Our opponents' attention to Robbie made things easy for us ... When Robbie started a play three of our backs went in one direction ... But the ball was passed to me direct and I went in the other, with no interference, usually hitting a hole in the line.

I am a football fan and see all the big games but I've never seen longer or more accurate passing than the Robinson-Schneider team showed me ... It should be remembered that they used a bigger and fatter football, harder to grasp, and offering greater air resistance than the narrower "projectile" of today ... I'd back Robinson against any of the pitchers today, big ball and all.

=== Men on a mission ===
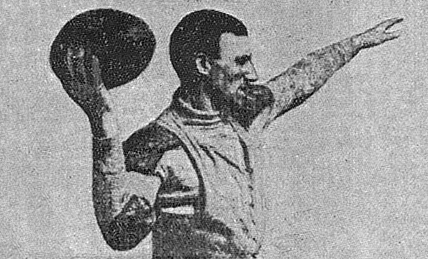
Robinson demonstrating "Overhand spiral—fingers on lacing" in "The Forward Pass and On-Side Kick" an article in Spalding's How to Play Foot Ball, American Sports Publishing, Revised 1907 edition, written by Eddie Cochems, Walter Camp, Editor

Cochems and his charges took it upon themselves to convert the football world to their belief that the forward pass had fundamentally changed the sport.

In an early November 1906 newspaper interview, Cochems' enthusiasm was evident. "I think the forward pass is sensational. My men never think of throwing the ball underhand. They throw it overhand as hard as they can."

"It's really a puzzle to me why the other teams are not given new style plays by their coaches," Cochems continued. "[The] Eastern elevens are using nothing but the old-style formations ... It will be a matter of a season or two until the coaches throughout the country come around to my way of thinking or I will be badly mistaken."

Cochems was, in fact, badly mistaken. The power teams of the East, who dominated the attention of national sportswriters in the early 20th century, were slow to adopt the forward pass. It would be seven years before Knute Rockne began to follow Cochems' example at Notre Dame. But, the slow adoption of his ideas was not for lack of promotional effort by Cochems.

The coach detailed his concepts in wires and letters to influential men in the sport.

Cochems wrote a 10-page article entitled "The Forward Pass and On-Side Kick" for the 1907 edition of Spalding's How to Play Foot Ball, edited by the "Father of American Football", Walter Camp. The coach explained in words and photographs (of Robinson) how the forward pass could be thrown and how passing skills could be developed. "[T]he necessary brevity of this article will not permit ... a detailed discussion of the forward pass," Cochems lamented. "Should I begin to explain the different plays in which the pass ... could figure, I would invite myself to an endless task."

The coach even urged the redesign of the football itself ... to make it better fit the passer's hand ... more aerodynamic ... in other words the football we know today.

The Post-Dispatch's W.G. Murphy reported on November 7, 1906, that the prostelitizing included indoctrinating the youngest fans: "In pursuance with Coach Cochems' plan to popularize the new game, Kenney, Schneider, Acker, Robinson and other members of St. Louis U.'s team visited a number of the local schools Monday and addressed the students on the fine points of the game."

=== A passing offense that "bewilders" opponents ===
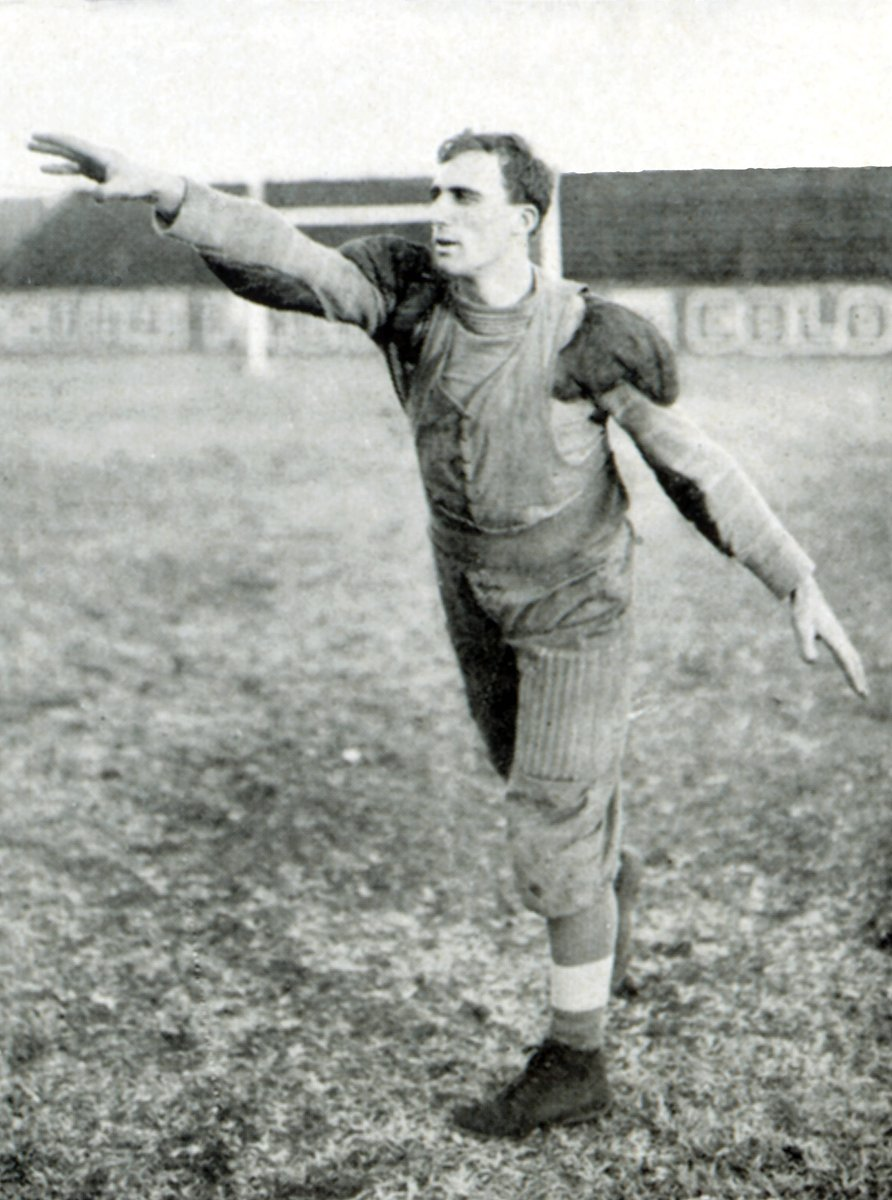
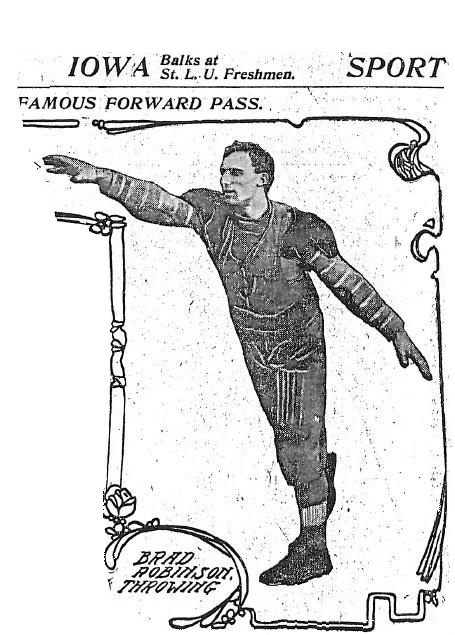
Left: Robinson throwing his famous "forward pass". At right, clipping published on St. Louis newspaper, November 28, 1906, from an article previewing the game with Iowa the next afternoon

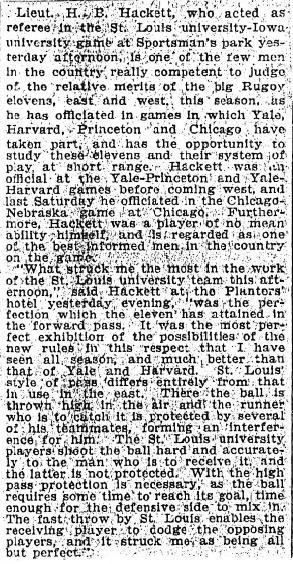
Referee Hackett's analysis of St. Louis' passing game against Iowa, St. Louis Globe-Democrat, written by Ed Wray, November 30, 1906

The fundamental change to the sport engendered by the introduction of the forward pass was manifest in St. Louis' 1906 Thanksgiving Day game at Sportsman's Park, where the Blue and White hosted the Iowa Hawkeyes. A year earlier on the same field, Iowa had humiliated St. Louis 31–0 (and Robinson had been carried off the field unconscious after a hard tackle).

In a newspaper article published the morning of the game, an anonymous writer correctly predicted, "It is to that leader who has grasped the possibilities of the new rules ... that success may come ... Indications point to a style of attack on Iowa's part which is virtually that of last year." The analysis continued, "No team, unless absolutely preponderant in physical strength and speed can hope to win out against an eleven like St. Louis university ... On the other hand, St. Louis U will, in all probability, spring a variety of play that will do to the visitors what it has not failed to do to every other eleven that has played here — bewilder it." The prediction could not have been more on the mark; the 12,000 fans in attendance witnessed St. Louis crush the Hawkeyes 39–0.

=== Historic demonstration of modern football ===
Hall of Fame coach David M. Nelson (1920–1991) considered the Iowa game to be of historic importance. In his book The Anatomy of a Game: Football, the Rules, and the Men Who Made the Game, Nelson writes that "eight passes were completed in ten attempts for four touchdowns" that afternoon. "The average flight distance of the passes was twenty yards."

Coach Nelson continues, "the last play demonstrated the dramatic effect that the forward pass was having on football. St. Louis was on Iowa's thirty-five-yard line with a few seconds to play. Timekeeper Walter McCormack walked onto the field to end the game when the ball was thrown twenty-five yards and caught on the dead run for a touchdown."

"Cochems said that the poor Iowa showing resulted from its use of the old style play and its failure to effectively use the forward pass", Nelson writes. "Iowa did attempt two basketball-style forward passes." The morning after the game, Wray wrote that Iowa's "weak attempt ... at the forward pass ... was an utter failure." On the other side of the ball, Wray observed, "Although Iowa seemed to know just when the (forward pass) was coming, the members of the Hawkeye team seemed to be unable to form a defense capable of stopping it.

"The use of the forward pass and the versatility of the St. Louis attack seemed to daze the Iowa team," Wray concluded. "Nearly every one of the plays planned this season by Coach Cochems were unloaded in this, the last game of the season, and Iowa looked on enthralled but impotent."

=== St. Louis' "perfect exhibition" of the passing game ===
The 1906 Iowa game was refereed by one of the top football officials in the country West Point's Lt. H. B. "Stuffy" Hackett. He had worked games involving the top Eastern powers that year and, just the Saturday before, had officiated in Chicago where Coach Amos Alonzo Stagg's national defending champion Maroons thrashed Nebraska 38-5. Hackett had played the game himself, quarter-backing the Army Cadets to a 40–5 rout of Navy in 1903. He was the first-ever winner of the Army Athletic Association Award. He would become a member of the American Intercollegiate Football Rules Committee in 1907 and be prominent in the game for the next three decades. Hackett was thus uniquely qualified to compare St. Louis' passing game with what everyone else in the country was doing in 1906. He was quoted the next day in Wray's Globe-Democrat article: "It was the most perfect exhibition of the new rules. that I have seen all season and much better than that of Yale and Harvard. St. Louis' style of pass differs entirely from that in use in the east. The St. Louis university players shoot the ball hard and accurately to the man who is to receive it. The fast throw by St. Louis enables the receiving player to dodge the opposing players, and it struck me as being all but perfect."

Hackett's analysis was reprinted in newspapers across the country, and when it appeared in The Washington Post, the headline screamed: "FORWARD PASS IN WEST – Lieut. Hackett Says St. Louis University Has Peer of Them All. – Says that Mound City Champions Showed Nearest Approach to Perfect Pass He Has Seen This Year."

Wray recalled the interview almost 40 years later: "Hackett told this writer that in no other game that he handled had he seen the forward pass as used by St. Louis U. nor such bewildering variations of it."

According to the November 19, 1932 Minneapolis Star, Hackett, who officiated games into the 1930s, once said of Robinson, "Whew, that chap is a wonder! He beats anything I ever saw. He looks as though 40 yards is dead for him, and he's got accuracy with it."

Nelson, who served as the secretary-editor of the NCAA's Football Rules Committee for 29 years, drives home the singular nature of St. Louis' pass attack: "During the 1906 season [Robinson] threw a sixty-seven yard pass ... and ... Schneider tossed a sixty-five yarder. Considering the size, shape and weight of the ball, these were extraordinary passes."

Sports historian John Sayle Watterson agreed. In his book, College Football: History, Spectacle, Controversy, Watterson described Robinson's long pass as "truly a breathtaking achievement."

Coach Stagg, who disputed St. Louis' leading role in developing the forward pass, pointed to Robinson's passing prowess as the real difference-maker: "It might be true that his passer, Robinson, could throw a longer spiral than anyone else for he was a gifted passer. However, Eddie Cochems was not the originator of the long spiral pass."

=== "There's the pass, boy" ===
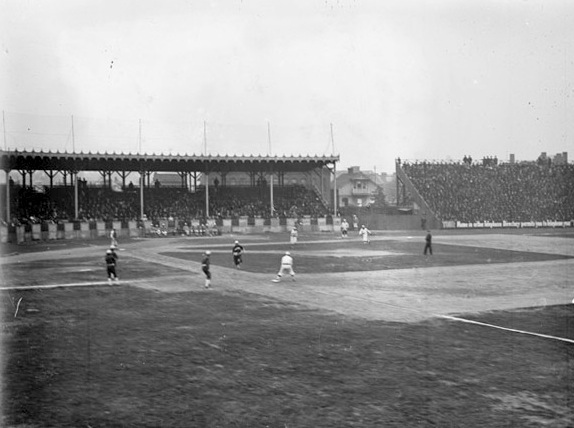
Sportsman's Park hosting a St. Louis Browns baseball game in 1907

Some credited Robinson with throwing an all-time record 87-yard missile to Schneider earlier that season in St. Louis' 34–2 win over Kansas before a crowd of 7,000 at Sportsman's Park. The distance was not reported in contemporary newspaper accounts but the 1933 Spalding's Football Guide listed the throw as official ... 87 yards in the air from passer to receiver ... as the Ogden Standard-Examiner reported in its November 12, 1933, issue:

Parke H. Davis (Football Guide editor and pre-eminent football historian) still insists that the longest forward pass ever thrown in a football game traveled 87 yards ... it was from Bradbury Robinson to John Schneider ... and it helped St. Louis to beat Kansas in the merry year of 1906 ...

A detailed account of the play was given by New York Evening World sports editor and cartoonist Robert W. Edgren as quoted by columnist Joseph "Roundy" Coughlin of the Wisconsin State Journal in 1934:

St. Louis had a mighty good team in those days and in this particular game with Kansas, determined to go out on the field and push over a few touchdowns without using the forward pass, just to prove that they could do something besides toss the ball. They kept the ball down on the ground during the first half and rolled up a lead of two or three touchdowns.

This didn't sit very well with Kansas and one of their ends named Bruner who was playing opposite Robinson, thought he would get Robinson's goat. "I thought you could pass," he said. "I heard you were a passing team, but all you do is buck the line. Show us a pass; just show it to us once."

Robinson looked him in the eye and said they would pass soon enough, and more than that, he would tell Bruner when it was coming. With the ball on its own 25-yard line, first down, St. Louis called for a pass on the first down. Robinson went back into punt formation and shouted to Bruner that they were going to show him the pass and to warn the rest of his team, because they were going to see something.

And they did!

Brad Robinson got hold of the ball, waited for Schneider to run down to the goal line (Robinson could take his time because Kansas had pulled all but five men in the backfield and these five were smothered by the St. Louis forwards) and then let fly. Nobody paid any attention to Scheider because he was so far away from the passer that such a throw seemed impossible. All the Kansas team could do then was to look skyward as the ball soared from one end of the field to the other, to plump into Fullback Schneider's arms on the goal line.

"There's the pass, boy," remarked Robinson. "How do you like it?"

According to The New York Times, Edgren was "(e)ven tempered always, well informed in all sports and ... always told the truth ...", lending credence to his account.

J. B. Sheridan's game summary the next day in the Post-Dispatch also indicates that St. Louis did not pass at all until well into the second half. His description of Robinson's long throw matched Edgren's account in many details, although there was no mention of verbal exchanges with Bruner.

One pass in particular made by Robinson to Schneider, which resulted in a touchdown, was a marvel of distance, accuracy and result. Standing on the 40-yard line, Robinson waited long. Then he threw right in the goal mouth to Schneider, who was tackled instantly, but fell across the touch line for a score. It was a wonderful play. How they handled the clumsy football on the throw, just as if it were a baseball, surprised me.

Sheridan chose to close his article by citing this "marvel" of a play – after making reference to earlier 20 and 40-yard passes by St. Louis. If Robinson was standing at his own 40 yard line when he made the throw, with the 110-yard field of the day, the pass would have traveled about 70 yards in the air.

Dan Dillon's "How the Game Was Played" in the Post-Dispatch the next morning gave no yardage details but he wrote that, "(a)t this magnificent exhibition of the spectacular forward pass the crowd went wild and Kansas was plainly up in the air on account of the machine-like method with which it was executed for such material gains."

SLU team captain Clarence "Pike" Kenney (later head football coach at Creighton and Marquette) wrote in the 1907 SLU yearbook that the longest pass of the 1906 season was "a record 48 yards." Nevertheless, he confirmed the 87-yard distance in a 1937 newspaper interview.

Robert Ripley highlighted the toss in his famous "Ripley's Believe It or Not" newspaper feature in 1945.

On October 15, 1947, the St. Louis Star and Times referred to the play as "a record that still stands."

A Northwestern University football program from the same year lists the 87-yard pass as one of the "Record Scoring Plays of All Time." It also credits "the late football chronicler Parke H. Davis" as its source.

Record-setting or not, Robinson's passing against the Jayhawkers impressed The Kansas City Times in a post-game analysis: "The forward pass was perhaps the most effective of (St. Louis') new plays which they used against Kansas. This was started from the punting formation. Robinson, an end, going back to pass the ball. Instead of making the usual basket-ball throw of the oval, however, he shot it straight forward in the same manner as he would throw a baseball, and wonderful indeed was the speed and accuracy with which it would fall into the hands of the backs waiting down the field."

=== "Huge and boney hands" ===
Professor Watterson wrote that, "Robinson ended up using passes that ranged from thirty to more than forty yards with devastating efficiency".

In their book Coaching Football, Super Bowl-winning player and coach Tom Flores and longtime coach Bob O'Connor report that "Robinson ... was credited with several 50-yard completions in 1906."

In the build-up to the 1906 game with Iowa, the Post-Dispatch reported that Robinson could "throw the oval 65 yards."

Coach Nelson related that some observers chalked up Robinson's passing prowess to an anatomical advantage. "St. Louis had a great passer in Brad Robinson," Nelson observed. "He had huge and boney hands, which led other coaches in the area to conclude that it was not possible to excel as a passer without these attributes. Having a passer without huge, boney hands was reason enough not to have an aerial game."

Robinson believed his physical advantage was the result of accident as well as genes. He credited his uncanny ability to throw long and accurate passes in part to a crooked little finger on his throwing (right) hand that was the result of a childhood injury. The misshapen pinkie helped impart a natural spiral to his tosses.

Reporters of the era also noted Robinson's disciplined preparation, in terms of his drills and workouts. Even when Robinson was in his sixties, his right arm was much more heavily muscled than his left, a testament to years of repeated exercise and practice.

=== SLU 407 – Opponents 11 ===
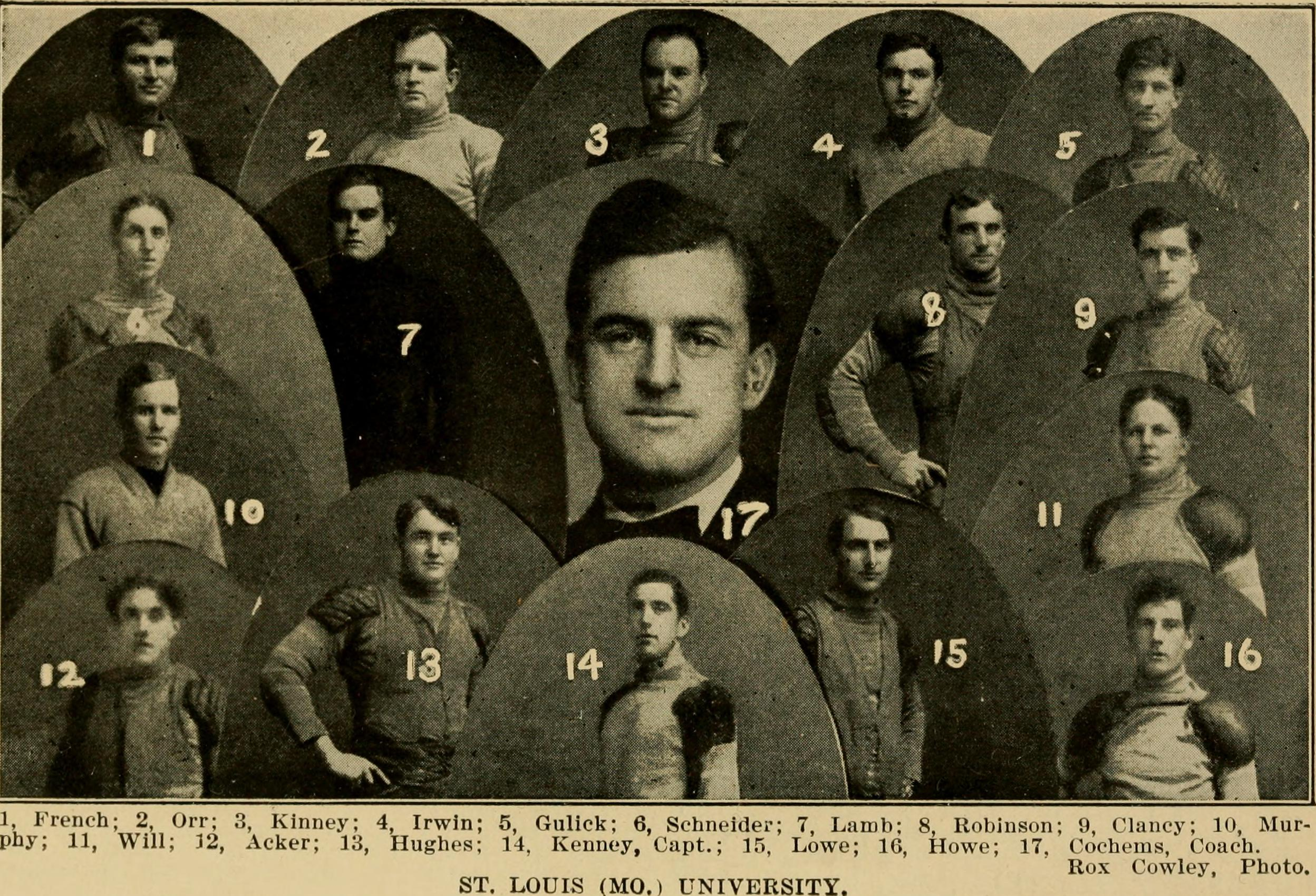
1906 St. Louis University "Blue and White"

The Blue & White cruised to an 11–0 record in 1906. Cochems and company led the nation in scoring, collectively outscoring their opponents 407–11.

In an October 1947 "Wray's Column," the Post-Dispatch editor wrote:

... the football world in general and the college and professional treasuries in particular are indebted to Cochems and Robinson and St. Louis University ... That's because the tremendous rise of gridiron interest everywhere can be traced directly of the Cochems–Robinson forward passing and to the improved spectacle it has made of this fine and manly game.

== 1907 season ==
SLU compiled a record of 7–3–1 in 1907 and was named Varsity-Trans-Mississippi Champion. The highlight of the season was a 34–0 thrashing of the Nebraska Cornhuskers on Thanksgiving Day.

Cochems introduced another innovation at St. Louis that season, having his team wear numbers on their uniforms to allow spectators to identify individual players. The move was called "a decided innovation" and was compared to the numbering of jockeys in horse racing.

The Blue and White traveled to the West Coast for a Christmas Day game against Washington State College, which St. Louis lost 11–0.

After the conclusion of the season, and even though most of his team consisted of medical students like Robinson and Schneider, charges were made that Cochems was using professional players. Several Midwestern universities, including Kansas, Missouri, Iowa and Wisconsin, refused to schedule games with St. Louis for the 1908 season, "claiming the team is tainted with professionals."

== The first triple threat ==
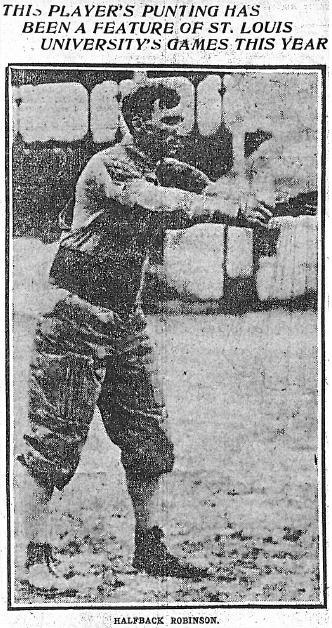
Robinson punting as depicted on the St. Louis Post-Dispatch, November 17, 1905

Brad Robinson was not only St. Louis' premier passer. He was also the Blue & White's principal kicker. One sports journalist of the time opined that, "of the local kickers, Robinson of St. Louis easily excels all others. He is good for at least 45 yards every time he puts his toe to the ball and some of his punts have gone 60 yards."

Watching a St. Louis practice in 1906, journalist Dillon observed Robinson "kicking in fine form and with a slight wind behind him, was dropping them over regularly from the 45-yard line and was averaging close to 50 yards on his punts."

Years before the term was commonly used by sportswriters, Bradbury Robinson had become the sport's first triple threat. Writing in October 1947, Ed Wray declared that the title belonged to Robinson.

We believe that Robinson also was the first triple-threat man in history because throughout the [1906] season Cochems used Robinson to pass, kick and run the ball ... He was an A1 punter, too ... And run! ... This three way use of Robby added greatly to the team's offensive deception."

== All-around athlete ==
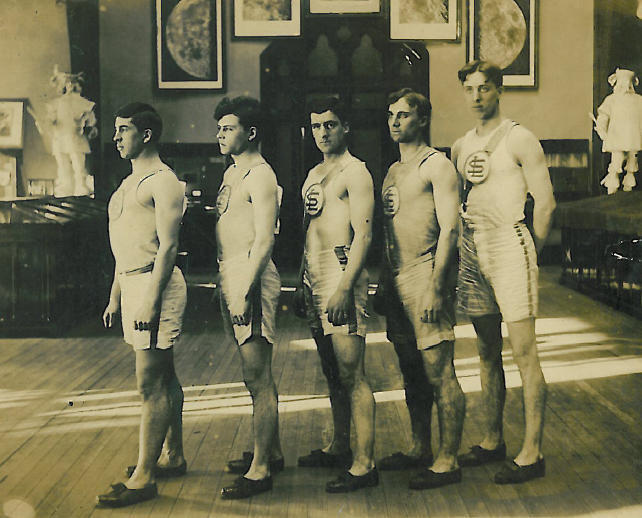
St. Louis U's 1906–07 champion relay team (left to right): Clarence "Pike" Kenney, Martin McMorrow, Bill Clancy, Robinson and Schneider

In addition to his exploits on the football field, Robinson was also a standout in baseball and track and field for the Blue & White, and was elected captain of both teams.

Upon his election as captain of the 1907 baseball team, the Post-Dispatch reported that

Robinson has demonstrated, since his entrance at the blue and white school, that he is a good all-around athlete. He played an excellent game at end for Cochems' eleven and did all the kicking for that team. His punting was consistent and proved a very valuable asset to the blue and white eleven. Aside from this, Robinson won recognition for his work in negotiating the famous forward pass, which gained favor every time it was employed. He throws the ball virtually as far as he kicks it, and astounded many of the eastern enthusiasts by his work in this regard.

He is a clever fielder and one of the hardest hitters on the varsity team. He also led the batters in the Bank Clerks' league, in which organization he played after the close of the collegiate season last year.

He is a good hurdler and at present is pushing Schneider hard for the supremacy in this event at the Jesuit school. He was captain of the track team last year.

At the time of Robinson's election as track captain, a local writer reported:

Immediately before the dual meet with Central Y.M.C.A. Saturday night, Robinson, the half back of the St. Louis rugby team last year, was chosen captain of the track team. Robinson's work on the track has been gilt-edged this season and his election to head the athletes was not a surprise.

That Robinson is a competent and loyal man to fill this position was evidenced by the manner in which he conducted himself Saturday evening.

He took first in the shot-put and ran almost a dead heat with Clancy in the hurdles, taking second place. When his school was short a man in the mile, owing to the sickness of Trotter, he entered the race, although he had not (run) in a long distance race before. He finished fifth.

Despite his own admirable performance, Robinson's team was not a winner that night ... a loss he attributed to "overconfidence" and "poor luck." "Murray, the crack dash man, was left at his mark owing to the poor service of the pistol," Robinson explained after the meet. "The gun failed to go off three times in succession and when the report finally came it took most of the men unaware and the heat was run in slow time."

In both 1906 and 1907 Robinson and his teammates were the Western AAU Indoor relay champions.

== Graduation, assistant SLU coach, early medical career ==
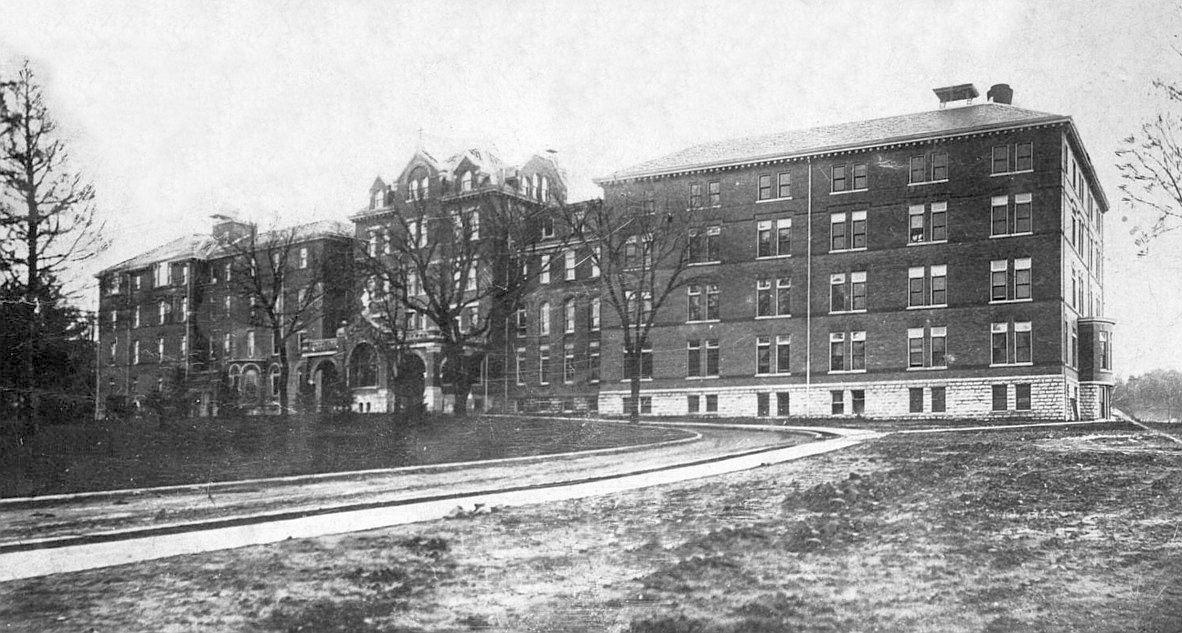
The Mayo Clinic's St. Mary's Hospital in 1910

Robinson pursued pre-med studies at Wisconsin before enrolling as a medical student at Saint Louis in 1904, where he earned his Bachelor of Science and medical degrees in 1908. He was elected to lead SLU's chapter of the Chi Zeta Chi Medical Society (which merged with Phi Rho Sigma in 1929). and was a member of the Phi Beta Pi "anti-fraternity" professional society.

After graduation, Robinson interned at a local hospital and served as Cochems' assistant coach the following fall, in what was the last year in St. Louis for them both. The Blue and White compiled a record of 7–2–1 in 1908, defeating the Arkansas Razorbacks (24–0), but losing to Pitt (13–0) and to Jim Thorpe and the Carlisle Indian School (17–0).

Robinson then moved to Rochester, Minnesota, where he practiced surgery at the Mayo Clinic's St. Mary's Hospital for the next two years.

== First marriage and son, military service ==
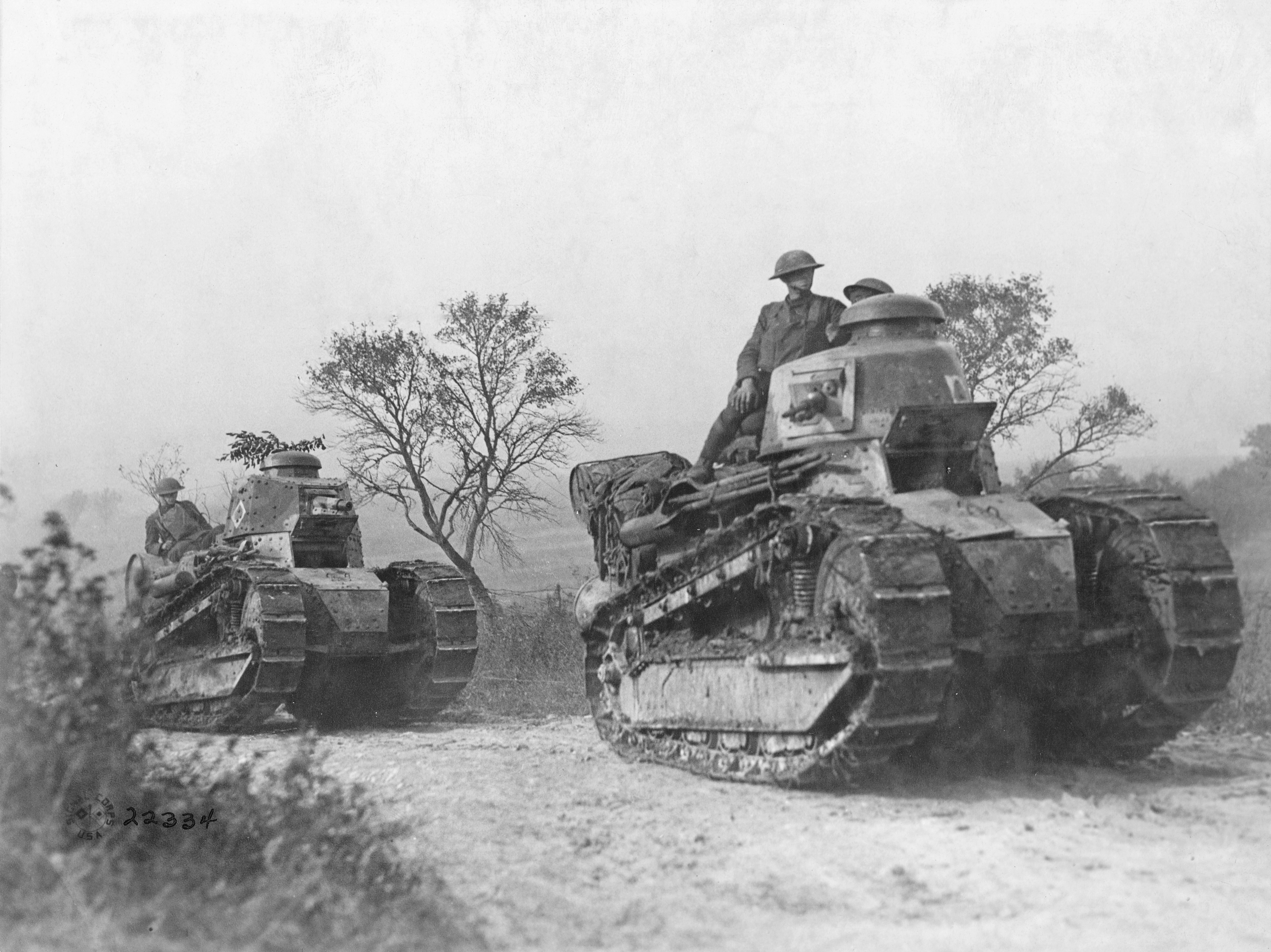
Robinson instructed U.S. soldiers in the operation of French Renault FT tanks

On March 7, 1910, he married Melissa Louise Mills, who died just four years later. Their only child, Bradbury Norton Robinson III, was raised by his paternal grandparents. Like his father, he played college football, wearing number 51 as a standout end for the Minnesota Golden Gophers from 1931 to 1933 and was a member of one of the All-America squads in 1931–32.

He was chosen for the 1933 East–West Shrine Game played in San Francisco and he played for the East All-Stars in the Century of Progress International Exposition game at Soldier Field in Chicago that same year. He was also a forward on the Gophers basketball team, serving as its captain in 1932–33.

After graduation, Brad Robinson, III, went into the advertising business. He also served as an analyst on college football broadcasts, one season being teamed with play-by-play man Ronald Reagan.

=== World War I service ===
Upon the United States' entry into World War I, Brad Robinson, Jr. enlisted and was sent to the First Officers Training Camp at Ft. Sheridan, where he won his commission as a captain of infantry on August 15, 1917. He was then assigned to the command of Company L, 340th Infantry Regiment of the 85th Division. He was sent overseas in July 1918.

In France, he became an instructor at the Inter-Allied Tank School in Recloses, until his battalion was ordered to the front on November 1, 1918, ten days before the Armistice.

== Second marriage, medical career in Europe ==
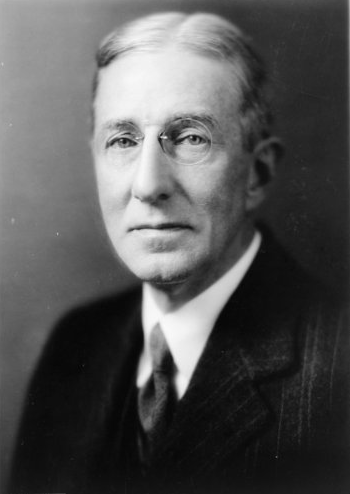
Hugh S. Cumming, U.S. Surgeon General 1920–1936. Robinson serves as a surgeon on his staff

After the war, Robinson elected to return in France to pursue post-graduate work. He met Yvonne Marie Dewachter (1898–1966) in 1919 while both were students at the University of Bordeaux. Dewachter was the elder daughter of one of Western Europe's leading merchants – and a renowned landscape painter – Louis Dewachter (nom d'artiste Louis Dewis). While Robinson spoke hardly a word of French, Yvonne Dewachter was fluent in English. A courtship ensued and the couple were married on August 12, 1919, in Paris, a month before Robinson received his discharge from the Army. They had seven children: Lois, Nadine, Richard, Janine, Yveline, Jacqueline and Corinne.

The growing family moved from one European city to another as Robinson continued clinical studies across the continent from 1920 to 1926, while serving as a surgeon on the staff of Hugh S. Cumming, Surgeon General of the United States. These included stays in Leeds, Liverpool, and London, England; Rotterdam, Holland; Antwerp, Belgium; Bordeaux, Le Havre, Nantes, Paris, and Poitiers, France; Edinburgh, Scotland; and Dublin, Ireland.

Cumming had been ordered to Europe to study the sanitary conditions of the ports to prevent the introduction of disease into the United States by returning troops. He also inaugurated a plan for the medical inspection of immigrants abroad in the principal countries of origin. Robinson played a role in both programs. The New York Times reported his arrival in New York City for a visit to the States in 1922:

One of the first-cabin passengers who arrived yesterday from Liverpool ... on the White Star liner Adriatic was Dr. Bradbury N. Robinson of the United States Public Health Service, who has been in England for two years assisting British officials at Liverpool and other ports in the examination of emigrants. He said that fully 25 per cent of the emigrants leaving Liverpool while he was there had to be what he termed "disinfested." Those who came from Southern Europe were clean because they had passed through so many disinfecting stations.

== Return to the U.S., physician, nutritionist and conservationist ==
Advertising circular for the Robinson Clinic from the 1940s

Robinson and his family moved to the United States to stay in 1926, locating to St. Louis, Michigan, in September of that year. He was drawn to the small city because of its natural mineral-rich water, which he believed would play an important role in his naturopathic and holistic medical practice. A frequent author on medical matters, he opened the Robinson Clinic in St. Louis in 1935, where he stressed a natural diet, cleansing, exercise and weight control. He cited the increased use of refined sugar as a particular threat to good health, an idea scoffed at during his lifetime and decades later, but an observation supported by an exhaustive study published in The Journal of the American Medical Association in 2014 and reported by the Harvard Heart Letter that year and in 2016.

=== Warnings against the use of DDT ===
In 1947, Robinson became one of the earliest to warn of the dangers of using the pesticide DDT in agriculture. This was a radical view at the time, especially in St. Louis, Michigan. Beginning in 1944, DDT had been researched and manufactured in St. Louis by the Michigan Chemical Corporation, later purchased by Velsicol Chemical Corporation. DDT had become an important part of the local economy.

Citing research performed by Michigan State University in 1946, Robinson, a past president of the local Conservation Club, opined that:

... perhaps the greatest danger from D.D.T. is that its extensive use in farm areas is most likely to upset the natural balances, not only killing beneficial insects in great number but by bringing about the death of fish, birds, and other forms of wild life either by their feeding on insects killed by D.D.T. or directly by ingesting the poison.

Some 15 years passed before the dangers of DDT were the subject of Rachel Carson's 1962 landmark book, Silent Spring. DDT's use in agriculture was banned worldwide in the 1970s and 1980s.

The Gratiot County Landfill just outside St. Louis, in which some of the chemicals from the DDT-producing plant had been disposed, became an Environmental Protection Agency Superfund site in the 1970s. The local population assumed the problem had been solved. But, in 1994, samples of the riverbed taken next to the former chemical plant site revealed that it was still 4% DDT. A local task force pressured the EPA into cleaning up the adjacent waterway, an effort that was still ongoing in 2017, 70 years after Robinson had published his warning.

== Civic life and politics ==
He was a member of the Baptist church, a Knight Templar, a 32nd degree Scottish Rite Mason, a Knight of Pythias, an Odd Fellow, and a post commander of the American Legion.

Robinson was a Republican and attended state conventions of that party. He was twice elected mayor of St. Louis, Michigan, in 1931 and 1937.

== Death ==
Robinson died at the Veterans Hospital in Bay Pines, Florida in 1949 from complications following routine surgery. He was buried at Arlington National Cemetery.

== Honors and recognition ==
Robinson was inducted into the St. Louis Billiken Hall of Fame in 1995 and into the Baraboo (Wisconsin) High School Athletic Hall of Fame in 2022. In 2009, SI.com and Sports Illustrated Kids listed Cochems' development of the forward pass and Robinson's historic touchdown pass to Schneider as the first of 13 "Revolutionary Moments in Sports." In 2010, Complex magazine recognized Robinson as the "Best Player" on the 1906 St. Louis squad, which the publication ranked among "The 50 Most Badass College Football Teams" in history, placing the Blue and White at 38th. Complex said it chose the teams based on "style, guts, amazing plays, and players and coaches that did things that just hadn't been done before." In 2011, Amy Lamare, writing on Bleacher Report, named St. Louis' 1906 game at Carroll College one of "The 50 Most Historically Significant Games in College Football."

== Sources ==
- Bradbury Robinson on Facebook
- St. Louis University archives, especially the 1907 "Blue and White" Year Book
- Gregorian, Vahe, "100 years of Forward Passing; SLU Was the Pioneer", St. Louis Post-Dispatch, September 4, 2006
- Nelson, David M., Anatomy of a Game: Football, the Rules, and the Men Who Made the Game, 1994
- Cochems, Eddie, "The Forward Pass and On-Side Kick", Spalding's How to Play Foot Ball; Camp, Walter, editor, 1907
- Memoirs and scrapbook of Bradbury N. Robinson, Jr., 1903–1949, including scores of newspaper clippings from the period, many without specific dates indicated
