= Horatio B. Hackett =

American architect

- Horatio Balch Hackett, Jr. Image: West Point Association of Graduates
- Born: May 8, 1880; Philadelphia, Pennsylvania, U.S.
- Died: September 8, 1941 (aged 61); Chicago, Illinois, U.S.
- Occupations: Architect, construction executive
- Football career

Army Black Knights
- Position: Quarterback

Career information
- College: Army (1900–1903)

Awards and highlights
- Army Athletic Association Award

Horatio Balch Hackett Jr. (May 8, 1880 – September 8, 1941) was a leading American architect and construction executive, a college football player and official, a decorated combat veteran of World War I, and Assistant Administrator of the Public Works Administration during the presidency of Franklin D. Roosevelt.

== Early life ==
Hackett was born in Philadelphia, where he attended the William Penn Charter School. He was the son of Pennsylvania State Senator Horatio Balch Hackett, who served as a captain in the 81st Pennsylvania Volunteers during the Civil War, and the grandnephew of the well-known Biblical scholar, Horatio Balch Hackett.

=== West Point ===
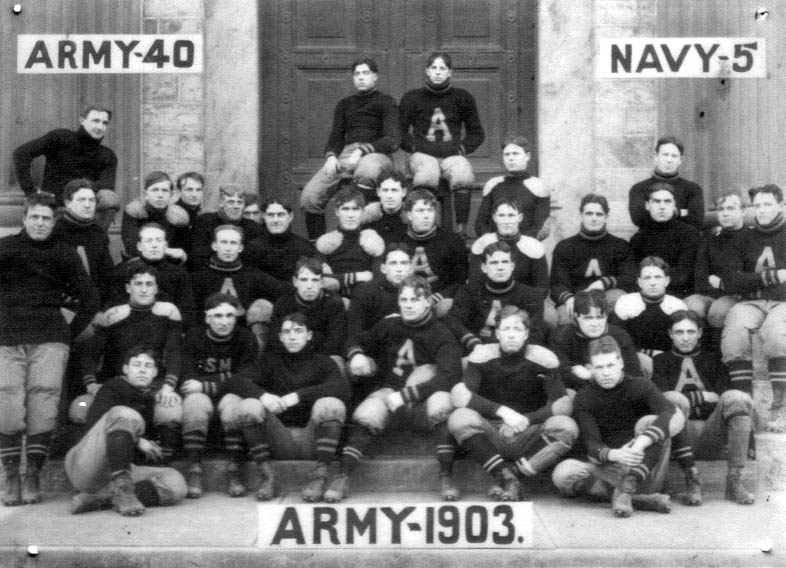
1903 Army football team after 40–5 win over the U.S. Naval Academy – Hackett (quarterback), front row, center

Hackett attended the United States Military Academy at West Point, New York, arriving on June 27, 1900, distinguishing himself by making the varsity football team in his plebe year. Eventually becoming the starting quarterback, his field generalship was credited with making the difference in many Army victories.

Alternately nicknamed "Dumpy", "Stuffy", and (later in life) "Rash", he competed in five sports at the academy. He was elected captain of the baseball team and was a standout in hockey and track. Along with some of his classmates, he introduced basketball at the academy. Hackett was the only cadet in the history of West Point athletics to oppose Navy in three sports: football, baseball and basketball. He was awarded eight letters for athletics, which was the maximum allowed at the time of his graduation in 1904. Hackett won the first ever Army Athletic Association Award.

== Football official ==
Hackett was a prominent figure in college football for most of his adult life. He served as a member of football's rules committee and had officiated Big Ten Conference football games for the better part of 30 years when he decided to retire just before the 1935 season. "I never missed a game, and was never late for a game," he told the Detroit Free Press. "I looked at that resignation letter a long time before I signed it, but I figured I had better quit ... This will be the first fall in 31 years, except when I was in France during the World War, that I haven't spent every Saturday afternoon and Thanksgiving Day on a football field."

Hackett was a unique, expert witness to the birth of the forward pass in 1906, the first year it was legal. He officiated games involving the major powers in the east, as well as Amos Alonzo Stagg's defending national champion Maroons' 38–5 shellacking of Nebraska at Chicago, before refereeing a Thanksgiving Day game at Sportsman's Park in St. Louis. It was there that 12,000 spectators watched St. Louis University crush Iowa 39–0 – and Hackett witnessed what he characterized as the "perfection" achieved by the offense of "Blue and White" coach Eddie Cochems and the unequaled passing of Bradbury Robinson, the sport's first triple-threat man.

He was quoted the next day in Ed Wray's St. Louis Globe-Democrat article, which was reprinted in other newspapers across the country, including The Washington Post: "It was the most perfect exhibition ... of the new rules ... that I have seen all season and much better than that of Yale and Harvard. St. Louis' style of pass differs entirely from that in use in the east. ... The St. Louis university players shoot the ball hard and accurately to the man who is to receive it ... The fast throw by St. Louis enables the receiving player to dodge the opposing players, and it struck me as being all but perfect."

Hackett was amazed at what he had seen, telling a sportswriter, "Whew, that chap (Robinson) is a wonder! He beats anything I ever saw. He looks as though 40 yards is dead for him, and he's got accuracy with it."

== Architect and businessman ==
After serving two years as a lieutenant in the Army, Hackett began his business career in 1908. He moved to Chicago, where he became architectural superintendent of D.H. Burnham & Company before joining Embree Iron Company as its general superintendent.

== Schools ==
Horatio B. Hackett School in Fishtown is named after him.

== Decorated war veteran ==
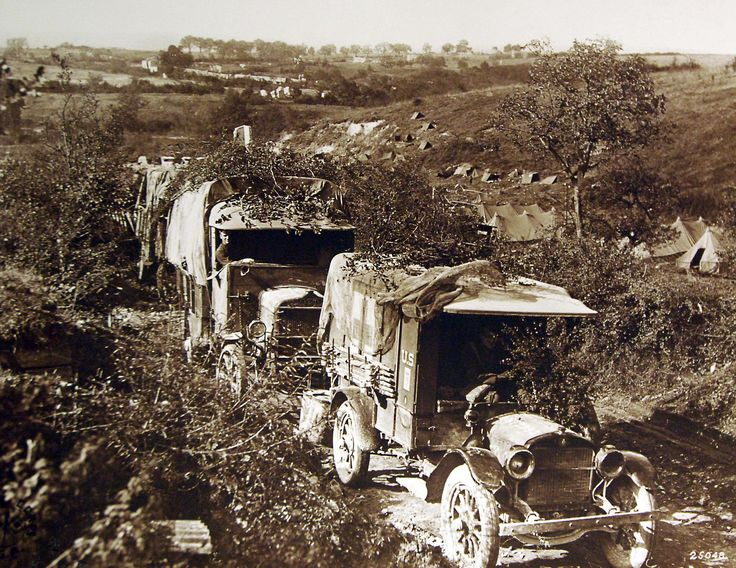
U.S. Army ambulance train near Very, France in 1918

When the United States entered World War I, he returned to active duty, serving in France as a Lieutenant Colonel and later a Colonel in the 124th field artillery, 33rd division of the American Expeditionary Forces.

Hackett saw active service in the engagements at St. Mihiel and the Argonne. On September 28, 1918, near Very, France, he suffered wounds that almost claimed his life. In his war diary, "The Cannoneers Have Hairy Ears," Robert J. Casey, who served under Hackett as a captain and later became an award-winning columnist for the Chicago Daily News, described the severity of Hackett's injuries and his long and difficult recovery:

The Colonel was almost dead from loss of blood when he reached a dressing station, but was pulled through by a remarkable constitution, plus a miracle. He was taken to a Paris hospital where strips of his shin bone were grafted onto his jaw. For two years his jaws were wired together and he lived on liquids and pastes administered through a hole provided by the extraction of four of his front teeth. He recovered completely.

Hours before Hackett was wounded, Casey, who earned three citations for bravery himself, sensed that the fighting was about to get deadly serious. Fearing he might never have another chance, Casey made sure to write down his thoughts on a man he considered an extraordinary commanding officer:

According to present indications I may be closing this journal for good almost any minute now and I might as well go on record regarding our CO. They don't make 'em any better. He doesn't like my attitude toward his war and I do. On that point we disagree but on no other. He's always up where the action is going on. He always knows what's doing. And he can't spare any time to look for deep dugouts. The men would lie down in the road to let him walk over them—and so, for that matter, would the officers. If I get knocked off right now, that's on paper.

Hackett was awarded the Distinguished Service Medal with Silver Star and the order of the Purple Heart.

== Return to the private sector ==
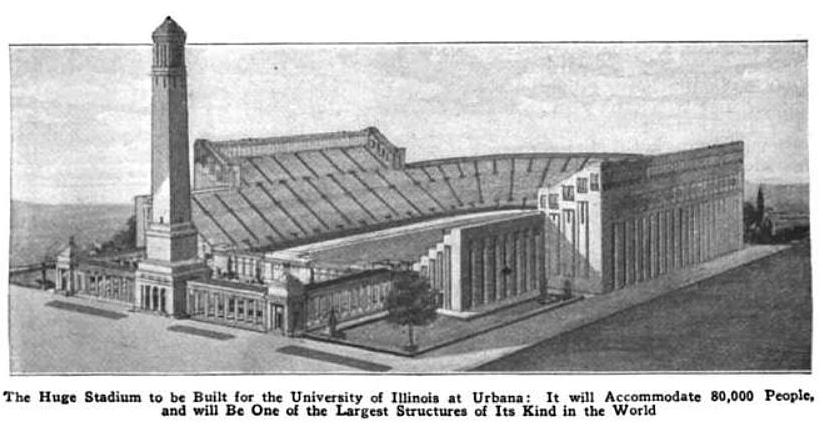
The original plan for Memorial Stadium at Urbana/Champaign, Illinois Popular Mechanics Magazine, 1921

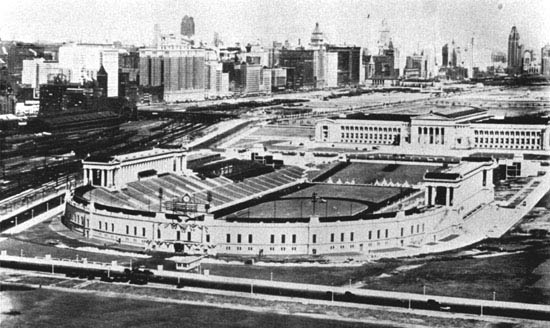
Chicago's Soldier Field in 1932

He was discharged from the Army in April 1919, at which time he became a member of the investment firm of John Burnham and Company.

In 1922, he became a partner in the Chicago architectural firm of Holabird & Root. He was in charge of construction for several large projects in the Chicago area, including 333 North Michigan, the Chicago Board of Trade Building, the Palmolive Building and the Stevens Hotel. He contributed to the final designs for both Illinois' Memorial Stadium at Urbana/Champaign and Soldier Field. He remained with Holabird & Root until 1934, when he responded once more to the call of public service.

== Franklin D. Roosevelt administration ==
Hackett again interrupted his business career when his government was in need of his skills – this time those related to building and construction rather than the battlefield.

Although raised a Republican, he signed on with the New Deal Public Works Administration. Hackett initially served as the Director of the PWA's Housing Division. Observers in Washington regarded his appointment as a move to speed up construction of low income housing, since the PWA had spent little of the $100 million allocated for that purpose. Later promoted to the position of Assistant Administrator, Hackett stepped down in 1937 to return to civilian pursuits.

== Final years in Chicago ==
In September 1937, he became vice president of the Chicago contracting firm of Coath and Goss, Inc., as well as vice president of the Chicago Venetian Blind Company. In March 1938, he left those positions to become the president of the building firm Thompson–Starrett Co., a pioneer in the construction of skyscrapers in the United States.

He resigned from Thompson-Starrett in January 1941 to become a part owner and president of Materials Service Corporation, a large producer of sand and gravel and owner of numerous stone quarries in the Chicago area.

In late August 1941, Hackett was admitted to Henrotin Hospital in Chicago suffering from pneumonia, complicated by a stroke. He died at that hospital several days later at age 61.
