= Jack Schneider =

American football player and coach (1883–1958)

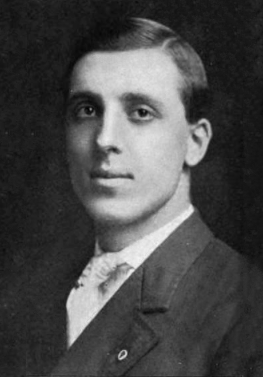
- Schneider in 1909

Biographical details
- Born: May 16, 1883
- Died: April 17, 1958 (aged 74); Jacksonville, Florida, U.S.

Playing career
- 1906–1907: Saint Louis

Coaching career (HC unless noted)
- 1909: Creighton

Head coaching record
- Overall: 3–3

William John Schneider (May 16, 1883 – April 17, 1958) was an American college football player and coach. He played for Saint Louis University. He is credited with making the first legal reception of a forward pass in American football, thrown by Bradbury Robinson in a game at Carroll College on September 5, 1906.

The first pass was caught by Jack Schneider (left) and thrown by Bradbury Robinson (right), photo c. 1906

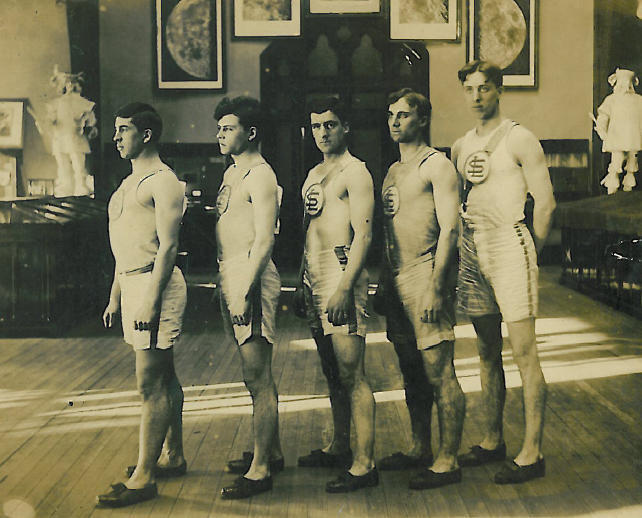
St. Louis U's 1906–07 champion relay team (left to right): Clarence "Pike" Kenney, Martin McMorrow, Bill Clancy, Robinson and Schneider

Interviewed in a Jacksonville, Florida hospital room in 1956, 50 years after the play, Schneider remembered what was also the first pass reception for touchdown in the game's history.

"We were in the second half and the game was tied when Robinson called the pass. Actually Robinson was an end and I was a fullback. But Brad could throw the ball a long way, so we switched positions for that one play.

"We were told to run after the snap and just keep going until we heard the passer yell 'hike' or our name. So, I ran and ran. I was about to give up when I heard Robinson call. I turned and caught the ball a yard or so short of the goal and went over with it."

Schneider was one of the "Wisconsin boys" who followed former Wisconsin assistant football coach Eddie Cochems in his move to St. Louis for the 1906 season.

He also ran track at St. Louis and for Alonzo Stagg at Chicago.

Schneider served as the football coach and athletic director at Creighton University in 1909, before joining many of his St. Louis football teammates in pursuing a career as a medical doctor.

== Head coaching record ==
Year	Team	Overall	Conference	Standing	Bowl/playoffs
Creighton Blue and White (Independent) (1909)
1909	Creighton	3–3			
Creighton:		3–3			
Total:		3–3			
