= Triple-threat man =

Type of player in gridiron football

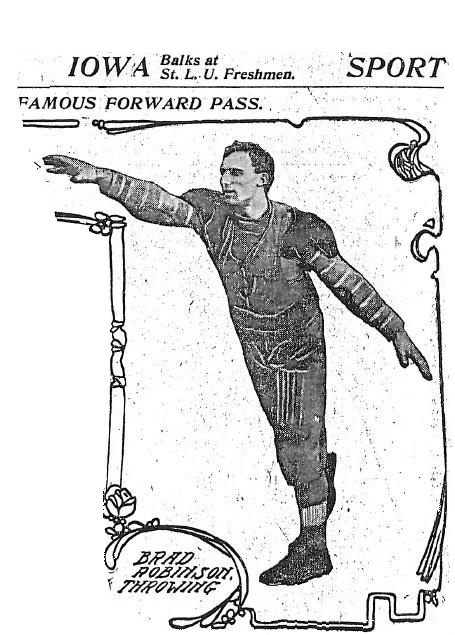
1906 St. Louis Post-Dispatch photograph of Brad Robinson throwing a forward pass

In gridiron football, a triple-threat man is a player who excels at all three of the skills of running, passing, and kicking. In modern usage, such a player would be referred to as a utility player.

Triple-threat men were the norm in the early days of football, as substitution rules were stringent. Thus, in addition to the need for passing, running, and kicking skills, they were also required to play defense. As injury awareness grew and substitution rules loosened, teams shifted to kicking specialists, which made the triple-threat man obsolete. One of the last triple-threat men in professional football was George Blanda, a quarterback and kicker who last played for the Oakland Raiders of the National Football League in 1975. Danny White, a quarterback and punter, retired in 1989. Since then, non-specialists have placekicked only extremely infrequently in the NFL. One instance occurred when Doug Flutie—also adept at both running and passing as a "scrambling" quarterback—drop kicked an extra point in 2006 during the last play of his career. Danny White of the Dallas Cowboys was the last non-specialist to kick on a regular basis, as he served as the team's starting quarterback and punter from 1980 until 1984, after several years as backup to Roger Staubach. There are, however, still dual-threat quarterbacks and wildcat halfbacks, who can both run and pass. A quarterback who played wide receiver in high school or college may sparingly catch passes or be converted into a wide receiver who occasionally passes.

In more recent times, the meaning of a triple-threat has shifted to include receiving ability rather than kicking. An example would be Taysom Hill of the New Orleans Saints, who is often called a triple threat for playing at quarterback, running back, and tight end.

For over forty years the NFL single-season scoring record was held by a triple-threat man, Green Bay Packers Hall of Famer Paul Hornung. Hornung set a record of 176 points in 1960 by scoring fifteen touchdowns, kicking forty-one extra points, and also kicking fifteen field goals.

== Football's first triple threat ==
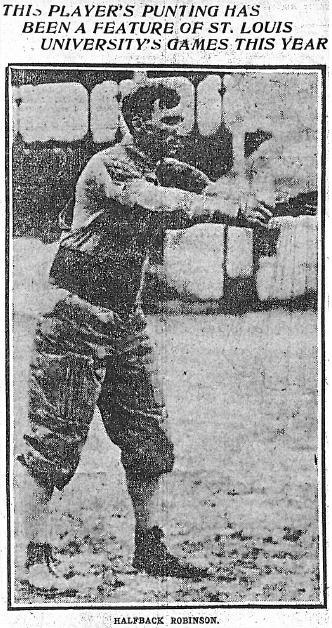
1905 St. Louis Post-Dispatch photograph of Brad Robinson preparing to punt

Saint Louis University's Bradbury Robinson, who threw the first legal forward pass in football history in 1906, was undoubtedly the first "triple-threat man". He was the Blue and White's premier passer, and sportswriters of the era reported that he "excelled" as a kicker and was an "electrifying" runner.

St. Louis Post-Dispatch sportswriter Ed Wray (John Edward Wray, 1873–1961) covered SLU football throughout Robinson's career. In an October 1947 column, Wray declared that the title of "first triple-threat man" belonged to Robinson "because throughout the 1906 season (St. Louis coach Eddie Cochems) used Robinson to pass, kick and run the ball... He was an A1 punter, too... And run!... This three way use of Robby added greatly to the team's offensive deception."

Referee Horatio B. Hackett of West Point was amazed by Robinson’s passing, having first witnessed his play at a St. Louis game in 1906. Hackett was a recognized expert, having officiated major college games for three decades and as a member of football's rules committee. In 1932, The Minneapolis Star quoted Major Hackett as saying of Robinson's passing: "Whew, that chap is a wonder! He beats anything I ever saw. He looks as though 40 yards is dead for him, and he's got accuracy with it."

Hall of Fame coach David M. Nelson (1920–1991) wrote that “St. Louis had a great passer in Brad Robinson.” In his book The Anatomy of a Game: Football, the Rules, and the Men Who Made the Game, Nelson marveled that Robinson threw a 67-yard pass in the 1906 season. “Considering the size, shape and weight of the ball”, Nelson concluded, such a pass was “extraordinary”.

Sports historian John Sayle Watterson agreed. In his book, College Football: History, Spectacle, Controversy, he described Robinson's long pass as "truly a breathtaking achievement". Professor Watterson added that, "Robinson ended up using passes that ranged from thirty to more than forty yards with devastating efficiency".

Robinson was also the Blue & White's principal kicker. One sports journalist of the time opined that, "of the local kickers, Robinson of St. Louis easily excels all others. He is good for at least 45 yards every time he puts his toe to the ball and some of his punts have gone 60 yards."

== Triple threat in the East ==
On November 24, 1906, Yale's Paul Veeder completed a 20 to 30-yard pass in a 6-0 win over Harvard. As an outstanding runner and Yale's kicking specialist during his career, Veeder may have assumed the mantle of "triple threat" that Saturday before a crowd of some 32,000 at New Haven.

The development of a true triple-threat man among the Eastern powers awaited their adoption of the forward pass as it had been pioneered at Saint Louis. Knute Rockne, who popularized the forward pass at Notre Dame in the mid-1910s, observed, “One would have thought that so effective a play would have been instantly copied and become the vogue. The East, however, had not learned much or cared much about Midwest and Western football. Indeed, the East scarcely realized that football existed beyond the Alleghanies…”.

Coach Nelson writes that the concept really took hold in 1912 when Carlisle coach Pop Warner "sprang his single wing or 'Carlisle' formation on the football world, and the triple-threat back was born."

The term "triple threat" was used frequently by sportswriters in the 1920s and thereafter. A 1920 New York Times article reports that such a player

is well built, tall, and possessed apparently of natural football ability. He is a first-class punter, an excellent drop kicker, an adept thrower of forward passes and a hard, fast runner. He would be the ideal triple-threat man for the backfield.

== See also ==
- Bradbury Robinson
- "A Triple Threat Man" (story by P. G. Wodehouse)
- Vic Janowicz
- Chic Harley

== Sources ==
- Saint Louis University archives
- Memoirs and scrapbook of Bradbury Robinson, 1903–1949
