= 1908 Western Conference football season =

- Sport: Football
- Champion: Chicago

Football seasons
- 1907 1909

1908 Western Conference football standings
	Conf.					Overall
Team	W		L		T	W		L		T
Chicago $	5	–	0	–	0	5	–	0	–	1
Illinois	4	–	1	–	0	5	–	1	–	1
Wisconsin	2	–	1	–	0	5	–	1	–	0
Indiana	1	–	3	–	0	2	–	4	–	0
Purdue	1	–	3	–	0	4	–	3	–	0
Iowa	0	–	1	–	0	2	–	5	–	0
Minnesota	0	–	2	–	0	3	–	2	–	1
Northwestern	0	–	2	–	0	2	–	2	–	0
$ – Conference champion

The 1908 Western Conference football season was the thirteenth season of college football played by the member schools of the Western Conference (later known as the Big Ten Conference) and was a part of the 1908 college football season.

After a two-year hiatus, Northwestern returned to the football field. Iowa would also make this their last year co-competing in the Western Conference and the Missouri Valley Intercollegiate Athletic Association, which they helped form in 1907.

== Season overview ==
Chicago would repeat as Western Conference champions, going 5–0 in league play and 5-0-1 overall.

Illinois (4–1) and Wisconsin (2–1) would finish at 5-1-1 and 5–1, respectively.

Indiana and Purdue would end up with league records of 1-3 and overall records of 2-4 and 4–3, respectively.

Iowa, Minnesota, and Northwestern would go winless in conference play at 0–1, 0–2, and 0–2. Northwestern's first football game in three years was played against a team made up of NU alumni, in which the varsity came out on top by a score of 10–6.

=== Chicago ===
Date	Opponent	Site	Result	Attendance	Source
October 3	Purdue	Marshall Field; Chicago, IL (rivalry)	W 39–0		
October 10	Indiana	Marshall Field; Chicago, IL	W 29–6		
October 17	Illinois	Marshall Field; Chicago, IL	W 11–5	8,000	
October 31	Minnesota	Marshall Field; Chicago, IL	W 29–0	15,000	
November 14	Cornell*	Marshall Field; Chicago, IL	T 6–6		
November 21	at Wisconsin	Randall Field; Madison, WI	W 18–12		
*Non-conference game; Source:

=== Illinois ===
Date	Opponent	Site	Result	Attendance	Source
October 3	Monmouth (IL)*	Illinois Field; Champaign, IL	W 17–6		
October 10	Marquette	Illinois Field; Champaign, IL	T 6–6		
October 17	at Chicago	Marshall Field; Chicago, IL	L 6–11	8,000	
October 31	Indiana	Illinois Field; Champaign, IL (rivalry)	W 10–0		
November 7	Iowa	Illinois Field; Champaign, IL	W 22–0		
November 14	at Purdue	West Lafayette, IN (rivalry)	W 15–6		
November 21	Northwestern	Illinois Field; Champaign, IL (rivalry)	W 64–8		
*Non-conference game

=== Wisconsin ===
Date	Opponent	Site	Result	Attendance	Source
October 10	Lawrence*	Randall Field; Madison, WI	W 35–0		
October 17	at Indiana	Jordan Field; Bloomington, IN	W 16–0		
October 24	vs. Wisconsin freshmen	Randall Field; Madison, WI	W 24–15		
October 31	Marquette	Randall Field; Madison, WI	W 9–6		
November 7	at Minnesota	Northrop Field; Minneapolis, MN (rivalry)	W 5–0	15,000	
November 21	Chicago^{†}	Randall Field; Madison, WI	L 12–18		
*Non-conference game; ^{†}Homecoming

=== Indiana ===
Date	Opponent	Site	Result
September 26	Indiana alumni*	Jordan Field; Bloomington, IN	W 11–0
October 3	DePauw*	Jordan Field; Bloomington, IN	W 16–0
October 10	at Chicago	Marshall Field; Chicago, IL	L 6–29
October 17	Wisconsin	Jordan Field; Bloomington, IN	L 0–16
October 31	at Illinois	Illinois Field; Champaign, IL (rivalry)	L 0–10
November 7	vs. Notre Dame*	Washington Park; Indianapolis, IN	L 0–11
November 21	at Purdue	Stuart Field; West Lafayette, IN (rivalry)	W 10–4
*Non-conference game

=== Purdue ===
Date	Opponent	Site	Result
October 3	at Chicago	Stagg Field; Chicago, IL (rivalry)	L 0–39
October 10	Earlham	Stuart Field; West Lafayette, IN	W 40–0
October 17	Monmouth (IL)	Stuart Field; West Lafayette, IN	W 30–0
October 31	DePauw*	Stuart Field; West Lafayette, IN	W 28–4
November 7	at Northwestern	Northwestern Field; Evanston, IL	W 16–10
November 14	Illinois	Stuart Field; West Lafayette, IN (rivalry)	L 6–15
November 21	Indiana	Stuart Field; West Lafayette, IN (Old Oaken Bucket)	L 4–10
*Non-conference game

=== Iowa ===
Date	Opponent	Site	Result	Source
October 10	Coe*	Iowa Field; Iowa City, IA	W 92–0	
October 17	at Missouri	Rollins Field; Columbia, MO	L 5–10	
October 24	at Morningside*	Sioux City, IA	W 16–0	
October 31	Nebraska	Iowa Field; Iowa City, IA (rivalry)	L 8–11	
November 7	at Illinois	Illinois Field; Champaign, IL	L 0–22	
November 14	Drake	Iowa Field; Iowa City, IA	L 6–12	
November 21	Kansas	Iowa Field; Iowa City, IA	L 5–10	
*Non-conference game

=== Minnesota ===
Date	Opponent	Site	Result	Attendance	Source
October 3	Lawrence*	Northrop Field; Minneapolis, MN	W 6–0	5,000	
October 10	Iowa State*	Northrop Field; Minneapolis, MN	W 15–10	5,000	
October 17	Nebraska*	Northrop Field; Minneapolis, MN (rivalry)	T 0–0	12,000	
October 31	at Chicago	Marshall Field; Chicago, IL	L 0–29	15,000	
November 7	Wisconsin	Northrop Field; Minneapolis, MN (rivalry)	L 0–5	15,000	
November 21	Carlisle*	Northrop Field; Minneapolis, MN	W 11–6	15,000	
*Non-conference game

=== Northwestern ===
Date	Opponent	Site	Result
October 10	Northwestern alumni*	Northwestern Field; Evanston, IL	W 10–6
October 24	Beloit*	Northwestern Field; Evanston, IL	W 44–4
November 7	Purdue	Northwestern Field; Evanston, IL	L 10–16
November 21	at Illinois	Illinois Field; Champaign, IL (rivalry)	L 8–14
*Non-conference game

=== Bowl games ===
No Western Conference schools participated in any bowl games during the 1908 season.

== All-American honors ==
=== Ends ===
- Harlan Page, Chicago (WC-3)

=== Guards ===
- John Messmer, Wisconsin (WC-2)
- Forest Van Hook, Illinois (WC-3)

=== Quarterbacks ===
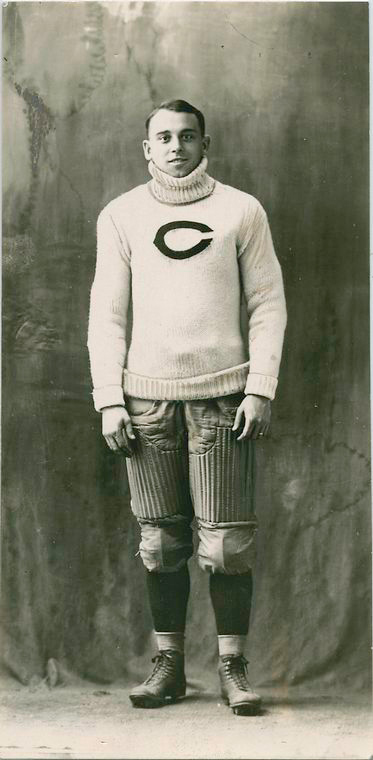
Walter Steffen of Chicago

- **Walter Steffen**, Chicago (College Football Hall of Fame) (WC-1; FY; NYET; PD; NHR; KCJ)

=== Key ===
NCAA recognized selectors for 1908

- WC = Collier's Weekly as selected by Walter Camp

Other selectors

- CON = Consensus based on All-American teams selected by 25 football experts; number indicates how many of the 25 experts selected the individual as a first-team All-American; any player with at least 5 of 25 selections is listed hear as a second-team selection: CON-2
- ERB = Composite All-America team selected by E. R. Bushnell based on aggregating the opinions of 30 football critics; number indicates how many of the 30 critics selected the individual as a first-team All-American
- NYW = New York World, selected by former Yale quarterback Tad Jones
- PI = The Philadelphia Inquirer, selected by Franklin
- FY = Fielding H. Yost, football coach of the University of Michigan
- TT = Tom Thorp, former star tackle and captain of Columbia
- NYG = New York Globe
- CSM = The Christian Science Monitor
- NYT = The New York Times
- NYET = New York Evening Telegram
- BSU = Brooklyn Standard Union
- BP = Boston Post
- PD = Pittsburgh Dispatch
- NHR = New Haven Register
- TJ = Tad Jones
- KCJ = Kansas City Journal
- PP = Philadelphia Press
- PT = Philadelphia Times
- PES = Philadelphia Evening Star
- WH = Washington Herald, selected by William Peet
- CIO = Chicago Inter-Ocean
- FC = Fred Crolius

Bold = Consensus All-American

- 1 – First-team selection
- 2 – Second-team selection
- 3 – Third-team selection

== All-Western selections ==
- James Dean, End, Wisconsin (ALF, CDN, WE)
- Walter Henry Rademacher, End, Minnesota (CDN, CRH)
- Harlan Page, End, Chicago (ALF, WE)
- Anderson, End, Wisconsin (CRH)

=== Tackles ===
- James Walker, Tackle, Minnesota (ALF, CDN, CRH, WE)
- Oscar Osthoff, Tackle, Wisconsin (ALF, CDN)
- Glenn D. Butzer, Guard, Illinois (ALF, CDN, CRH)
- William Mackmiller, Guard, Wisconsin (ALF)
- Henry E. Farnum, Center, Minnesota (CDN, CRH)
- Benjamin Harrison Badenoch, Center, Chicago (ALF)
- John McGovern, Quarterback, Minnesota (ALF, CRH, WE) (CFHOF)
- Harlan Page, Quarterback, Chicago (CDN)
- William Lucas Crawley, Halfback, Chicago (ALF, CRH)
- Reuben Martin Rosenwald, Halfback, Minnesota (ALF, CDN)
- Earle T. Pickering, Fullback, Minnesota (ALF, CRH)
- Oscar William Worthwine, Fullback, Chicago (CDN)
