= 1907 Western Conference football season =

- Sport: Football
- Champion: Chicago

Football seasons
- 1906 1908

1907 Western Conference football standings
	Conf.					Overall
Team	W		L		T	W		L		T
Chicago $	4	–	0	–	0	4	–	1	–	0
Wisconsin	3	–	1	–	1	3	–	1	–	1
Illinois	3	–	2	–	0	3	–	2	–	0
Iowa	1	–	1	–	0	3	–	2	–	0
Minnesota	0	–	1	–	1	2	–	2	–	1
Indiana	0	–	3	–	0	2	–	3	–	1
Purdue	0	–	3	–	0	0	–	5	–	0
$ – Conference champion

The 1907 Western Conference football season was the twelfth season of college football played by the member schools of the Western Conference (later known as the Big Ten Conference) and was a part of the 1907 college football season.

In April 1907, Michigan was voted out of the conference for refusing to adhere to new league rules that had been adopted earlier and spearheaded by UM president James Burrill Angell. As a result, Western Conference schools were not supposed to play Michigan again until they rejoined the league in 1918.

In 1907, Iowa helped form the Missouri Valley Intercollegiate Athletic Association with Kansas, Missouri, Nebraska, and Washington University in St. Louis, while still maintaining membership in the Western Conference. The MVIAA would eventually become the Big Eight Conference.

== Season overview ==
With a 4–0 conference record, the Chicago Maroons would claim the 1907 championship, finishing 4–1 overall. Their only loss came to the Carlisle Indians, led by head coach Pop Warner, All-American Pete Hauser, and newcomer Jim Thorpe

Wisconsin would finish behind the Maroons at 3-1-1 (all Western games), and Illinois followed at 3-2 (also, all Western games). Iowa also had a 3–2 overall record, but went 1–1 in conference play.

Minnesota, Indiana, and Purdue all wrapped up the year winless in the conference, but only Purdue went the 1907 season without a victory.

Northwestern was in their second season without a football program, last playing a game in 1905. The Purple would be welcomed back to the gridiron in 1908.

=== Chicago ===
Date	Opponent	Site	Result	Attendance	Source
October 12	Indiana	Marshall Field; Chicago, IL	W 27–6		
October 19	at Illinois	Illinois Field; Champaign, IL	W 42–6		
November 2	at Minnesota	Northrop Field; Minneapolis, MN	W 18–12	18,000	
November 9	Purdue	Marshall Field; Chicago, IL (rivalry)	W 56–0		
November 23	Carlisle*	Marshall Field; Chicago, IL	L 4–18		
*Non-conference game

=== Wisconsin ===
Date	Opponent	Site	Result
October 26	Illinois	Randall Field; Madison, WI	L 4–15
November 2	at Iowa	Iowa Field; Iowa City, IA (rivalry)	W 6–5
November 9	Indiana	Randall Field; Madison, WI	W 12–6
November 16	at Purdue	Stuart Field; West Lafayette, IN	W 12–6
November 23	Minnesota	Randall Field; Madison, WI (rivalry)	T 17–17

=== Illinois ===
Date	Opponent	Site	Result
October 19	Chicago	Illinois Field; Champaign, IL	L 6–42
October 26	at Wisconsin	Randall Field; Madison, WI	W 15–4
November 2	Purdue	Illinois Field; Champaign, IL (rivalry)	W 21–4
November 9	at Iowa	Iowa Field; Iowa City, IA	L 12–25
November 22	at Indiana	Jordan Field; Bloomington, IN (rivalry)	W 10–6

=== Iowa ===
Date	Opponent	Site	Result	Source
October 10	Missouri	Iowa Field; Iowa City, IA	W 21–6	
October 26	at Drake*	Haskins Field; Des Moines, IA	W 25–4	
November 2	at Wisconsin	Randall Field; Madison, WI (rivalry)	L 5–6	
November 9	Illinois	Iowa Field; Iowa City, IA	W 25–12	
November 23	at Iowa State*	State Field; Ames, IA (rivalry)	L 14–20	
*Non-conference game

=== Minnesota ===
Date	Opponent	Site	Result	Attendance
October 12	Iowa State*	Northrop Field; Minneapolis, MN	W 8–0	5,000
October 19	Nebraska*	Northrop Field; Minneapolis, MN (rivalry)	W 8–5	8,000
November 2	Chicago	Northrop Field; Minneapolis, MN	L 12–18	18,000
November 16	Carlisle*	Northrop Field; Minneapolis, MN	L 10–12	15,000
November 23	at Wisconsin	Randall Field; Madison, WI (rivalry)	T 17–17	
*Non-conference game

=== Indiana ===
Date	Opponent	Site	Result
October 5	DePauw*	Jordan Field; Bloomington, IN	W 25–9
October 12	at Chicago	Marshall Field; Chicago, IL	L 6–27
October 19	Indiana alumni	Jordan Field; Bloomington, IN	W 40–0
November 2	at Notre Dame	Cartier Field; Notre Dame, IN	T 0–0
November 9	at Wisconsin	Randall Field; Madison, WI	L 8–11
November 22	Illinois*	Jordan Field; Bloomington, IN (rivalry)	L 6–10
*Non-conference game

=== Purdue ===
Date	Opponent	Site	Result	Source
October 12	Wabash*	Stuart Field; West Lafayette, IN	L 0–2	
November 2	at Illinois	Illinois Field; Champaign, IL (rivalry)	L 4–21	
November 9	at Chicago	Stagg Field; Chicago, IL (rivalry)	L 0–56	
November 16	Wisconsin	Stuart Field; West Lafayette, IN	L 6–12	
November 23	Notre Dame	Stuart Field; West Lafayette, IN (rivalry)	L 0–17	
*Non-conference game

=== Bowl games ===
No Western Conference schools participated in any bowl games during the 1907 season.

== All-American honors ==
The following Western Conference players were selected as first-team players on the 1907 All-America college football team. (Consensus All-Americans displayed in bold).

=== Quarterbacks ===
- Walter Steffen, Chicago (College Football Hall of Fame) (WC-3)

=== Halfbacks ===
- George Capron, Minnesota (WC-3)

=== Key ===
NCAA recognized selectors for 1907

- WC = Collier's Weekly as selected by Walter Camp
- CW = Caspar Whitney

Other selectors

- NYH = New York Herald
- NYT = New York Tribune
- NYW = New York World (Robert Edgren)
- NYP = New York Press
- FY = Fielding H. Yost, football coach of the University of Michigan, for the North American Press Syndicate.
- CF = Carl Flanders
- CR = Constant Reader
- AFR = Abilene Semi Weekly Farm Reporter. "selected not according to their weight, but their conception of the new game"

Bold = Consensus All-American

- 1 – First-team selection
- 2 – Second-team selection
- 3 – Third-team selection

== All-Western selections ==
- Hewitt, End, Chicago (CA, CDN, CP, CRH)
- Harlan Page, End, Chicago (CIO, CJ, CP) (CBHOF)
- Harlan Rogers, End, Wisconsin (CE)
- John Messmer, Tackle, Wisconsin (CA, CIO, CJ, COL [guard], CRH, WE [guard])
- George Leland Case, Tackle, Minnesota (CDN, CIO, CP, WE)
- Ivan Doseff, Tackle, Chicago (CE, CJ, COL)
- Forest Van Hook, Guard, Illinois (CA, CDN, CE, CIO, CJ, COL, CP, CRH, WE)
- William John Bandelin, Guard, Minnesota (CA, CE)
- Harris, Guard, Chicago (CDN)
- Walter Steffen, Quarterback, Chicago (CA, CDN, CE, CIO, CJ, COL, CP, CRH, WE) (CFHOF)
- Leo DeTray, Halfback,Chicago (CA [fullback], CDN, CE, CIO, CJ, COL, CP, CRH [fullback], WE)
- Carroll N. Kirk, Halfback,Iowa (CA, CE, CRH)
- John Robert Schuknecht, Halfback,Minnesota (CIO, CJ, COL [fullback])
- Harold Iddings, Halfback,Chicago (CDN, COL [end], WE)
- Oscar Osthoff, Halfback, Wisconsin (CP)
- George Capron, Fullback, Minnesota (CA [halfback], CDN, CE, CIO, CJ, COL [halfback], CP, CRH [halfback], WE [end])
