= 1908 Illinois Fighting Illini football team =

American college football season

1908 Illinois Fighting Illini football
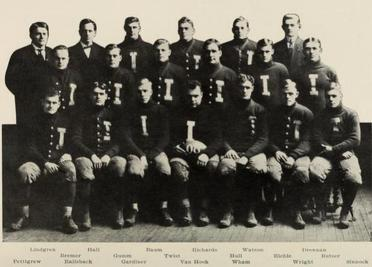
- Conference: Western Conference
- Record: 5–1–1 (3–1 Western)
- Head coach: Arthur R. Hall (3rd season)
- Captain: Forest Van Hook
- Home stadium: Illinois Field

1908 Western Conference football standings
	Conf.					Overall
Team	W		L		T	W		L		T
Chicago $	5	–	0	–	0	5	–	0	–	1
Illinois	4	–	1	–	0	5	–	1	–	1
Wisconsin	2	–	1	–	0	5	–	1	–	0
Indiana	1	–	3	–	0	2	–	4	–	0
Purdue	1	–	3	–	0	4	–	3	–	0
Iowa	0	–	1	–	0	2	–	5	–	0
Minnesota	0	–	2	–	0	3	–	2	–	1
Northwestern	0	–	2	–	0	2	–	2	–	0
$ – Conference champion

The 1908 Illinois Fighting Illini football team was an American football team that represented the University of Illinois during the 1908 college football season. In their third non-consecutive season under head coach Arthur R. Hall, the Illini compiled a 5–1–1 record and finished in second place in the Western Conference. Guard Forest Van Hook was the team captain.

== Schedule ==
Date	Opponent	Site	Result	Attendance	Source
October 3	Monmouth (IL)*	Illinois Field; Champaign, IL	W 17–6		
October 10	Marquette	Illinois Field; Champaign, IL	T 6–6		
October 17	at Chicago	Marshall Field; Chicago, IL	L 6–11	8,000	
October 31	Indiana	Illinois Field; Champaign, IL (rivalry)	W 10–0		
November 7	Iowa	Illinois Field; Champaign, IL	W 22–0		
November 14	at Purdue	West Lafayette, IN (rivalry)	W 15–6		
November 21	Northwestern	Illinois Field; Champaign, IL (rivalry)	W 64–8		
*Non-conference game

== Awards and honors ==
- Forest Van Hook, guard

- Third-team selection by Walter Camp for Collier's Weekly 1908 College Football All-America Team
