= 1907 Illinois Fighting Illini football team =

American college football season

1907 Illinois Fighting Illini football
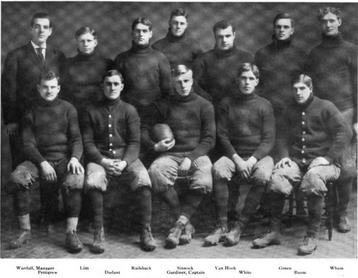
- Conference: Western Conference
- Record: 3–2 (3–2 Western)
- Head coach: Arthur R. Hall (2nd season)
- Captain: Lion Gardiner
- Home stadium: Illinois Field

1907 Western Conference football standings
	Conf.					Overall
Team	W		L		T	W		L		T
Chicago $	4	–	0	–	0	4	–	1	–	0
Wisconsin	3	–	1	–	1	3	–	1	–	1
Illinois	3	–	2	–	0	3	–	2	–	0
Iowa	1	–	1	–	0	3	–	2	–	0
Minnesota	0	–	1	–	1	2	–	2	–	1
Indiana	0	–	3	–	0	2	–	3	–	1
Purdue	0	–	3	–	0	0	–	5	–	0
$ – Conference champion

The 1907 Illinois Fighting Illini football team was an American football team that represented the University of Illinois during the 1907 college football season. In their second non-consecutive season under head coach Arthur R. Hall, the Illini compiled a 3–2 record and finished in third place in the Western Conference. Halfback Lion Gardiner was the team captain.

== Schedule ==
Date	Opponent	Site	Result
October 19	Chicago	Illinois Field; Champaign, IL	L 6–42
October 26	at Wisconsin	Randall Field; Madison, WI	W 15–4
November 2	Purdue	Illinois Field; Champaign, IL (rivalry)	W 21–4
November 9	at Iowa	Iowa Field; Iowa City, IA	L 12–25
November 22	at Indiana	Jordan Field; Bloomington, IN (rivalry)	W 10–6
