= 1908 Iowa Hawkeyes football team =

American college football season

1908 Iowa Hawkeyes football
- Conference: Missouri Valley Conference, Western Conference
- Record: 2–5 (0–4 MVC, 0–1 Western)
- Head coach: Mark Catlin Sr. (3rd season)
- Captain: Carroll N. Kirk
- Home stadium: Iowa Field

1908 Missouri Valley Conference football standings
	Conf.					Overall
Team	W		L		T	W		L		T
Kansas $	4	–	0	–	0	9	–	0	–	0
Nebraska	2	–	1	–	0	7	–	2	–	1
Iowa State	2	–	1	–	0	6	–	3	–	0
Missouri	3	–	2	–	0	6	–	2	–	0
Drake	1	–	2	–	0	5	–	2	–	0
Washington University	0	–	2	–	0	4	–	4	–	1
Iowa	0	–	4	–	0	2	–	5	–	0
$ – Conference champion

1908 Western Conference football standings
	Conf.					Overall
Team	W		L		T	W		L		T
Chicago $	5	–	0	–	0	5	–	0	–	1
Illinois	4	–	1	–	0	5	–	1	–	1
Wisconsin	2	–	1	–	0	5	–	1	–	0
Indiana	1	–	3	–	0	2	–	4	–	0
Purdue	1	–	3	–	0	4	–	3	–	0
Iowa	0	–	1	–	0	2	–	5	–	0
Minnesota	0	–	2	–	0	3	–	2	–	1
Northwestern	0	–	2	–	0	2	–	2	–	0
$ – Conference champion

The 1908 Iowa Hawkeyes football team was an American football team that represented the State University of Iowa ("S.U.I."), now commonly known as the University of Iowa, as a member of both the Missouri Valley Conference (MVC) and the Western Conference during the 1908 college football season. In their third and final year under head coach Mark Catlin Sr., the Hawkeyes compiled a 2–5 record. They placed last in the MVC with a 0–4 record in MVC games, and sixth in the Western Conference with a 0–1 record against its lone Western Conference opponent, Illinois. Halfback Carroll N. Kirk was the team captain. The team played home games at Iowa Field in Iowa City, Iowa.

On October 2, 1908, the Hawkeyes opened their season with a 92–0 victory over Coe. Charles Hazard scored four touchdowns, and Carroll Kirk led the scoring with three touchdowns, a dropkick, and seven extra points. At the time, it was the largest margin of victory in Iowa football history. It remains the second-largest margin, exceeded only by a 95–0 victory in 1914. After a strong showing in the opener, the Hawkeyes lost five of their six remaining games, including losses to Missouri, Nebraska, Illinois, and Kansas.

== Schedule ==
Date	Opponent	Site	Result	Source
October 10	Coe*	Iowa Field; Iowa City, IA	W 92–0	
October 17	at Missouri	Rollins Field; Columbia, MO	L 5–10	
October 24	at Morningside*	Sioux City, IA	W 16–0	
October 31	Nebraska	Iowa Field; Iowa City, IA (rivalry)	L 8–11	
November 7	at Illinois	Illinois Field; Champaign, IL	L 0–22	
November 14	Drake	Iowa Field; Iowa City, IA	L 6–12	
November 21	Kansas	Iowa Field; Iowa City, IA	L 5–10	
*Non-conference game

== Players ==
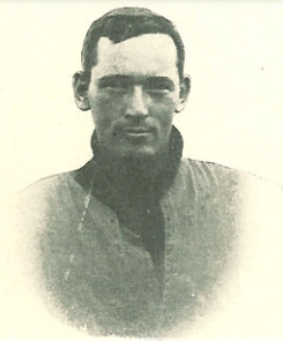
Captain Kirk

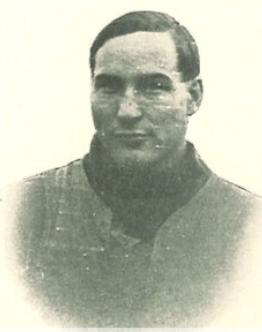
"Peck" Hazard

The following 13 players received varsity letters for their participation on the 1908 team:

- William Carberry, end
- Benjamin Collins, halfback
- Ross Comly, center
- Joseph Fee, halfback
- Raymond Gross, tackle
- Irving Hastings, guard
- Charles "Peck" Hazard, fullback
- Mike Hyland, end
- Carroll N. Kirk, halfback, Marshalltown, Iowa
- James Perrine, end
- Aaron "Fat" Seidel, guard
- Walter "Stub" Stewart, quarterback
- Isaac Stutsman, tackle
