= 1907 Iowa Hawkeyes football team =

American college football season

1907 Iowa Hawkeyes football

MVC co-champion
- Conference: Missouri Valley Conference, Western Conference
- Record: 3–2 (1–0 MVC, 1–1 Western)
- Head coach: Mark Catlin Sr. (2nd season)
- Captain: R. A. White
- Home stadium: Iowa Field

1907 Missouri Valley Conference football standings
	Conf.					Overall
Team	W		L		T	W		L		T
Iowa +	1	–	0	–	0	3	–	2	–	0
Nebraska +	1	–	0	–	0	8	–	2	–	0
Kansas	1	–	1	–	0	5	–	3	–	0
Missouri	1	–	2	–	0	7	–	2	–	0
Washington University	0	–	1	–	0	1	–	5	–	1
+ – Conference co-champions

1907 Western Conference football standings
	Conf.					Overall
Team	W		L		T	W		L		T
Chicago $	4	–	0	–	0	4	–	1	–	0
Wisconsin	3	–	1	–	1	3	–	1	–	1
Illinois	3	–	2	–	0	3	–	2	–	0
Iowa	1	–	1	–	0	3	–	2	–	0
Minnesota	0	–	1	–	1	2	–	2	–	1
Indiana	0	–	3	–	0	2	–	3	–	1
Purdue	0	–	3	–	0	0	–	5	–	0
$ – Conference champion

The 1907 Iowa Hawkeyes football team was an American football team that represented the State University of Iowa ("S.U.I."), now commonly known as the University of Iowa, as a member of the Western Conference during the 1907 college football season. In their second year under head coach Mark Catlin Sr., the Hawkeyes compiled a 3–2 record and outscored opponents by a total of 90 to 48.

Iowa had been a member of the Western Conference since 1900. In 1907, a new conference, the MVC, was formed, and Iowa elected to join that conference as well. The Hawkeyes won their only MVC game in 1907, defeating Missouri which resulted in a tie with Nebraska for the inaugural MVC championship. The Hawkeyes remained a member of the Western Conference in 1907, finishing in fourth place with a 1–1 record in conference games.

End Roy A. White was the team captain. Quarterback Walter "Stub" Stewart was later inducted into the Iowa Varsity Club Hall of Fame.

The team played its home games at Iowa Field in Iowa City, Iowa.

== Schedule ==
Date	Opponent	Site	Result	Source
October 19	Missouri	Iowa Field; Iowa City, IA	W 21–6	
October 26	at Drake*	Haskins Field; Des Moines, IA	W 25–4	
November 2	Wisconsin	Iowa Field; Iowa City, IA (rivalry)	L 5–6	
November 9	Illinois	Iowa Field; Iowa City, IA	W 25–12	
November 23	at Iowa State*	State Field; Ames, IA (rivalry)	L 14–20	
*Non-conference game

== Players ==
The following 14 players received varsity letters for their performance on the 1907 team:

- Francis Bruggeman
- William L. Carberry
- Edward Connor
- Edward Elliott
- Carl Fritzel
- Raymond Gross
- Irving Hastings
- Charles Hazard
- John Jewell
- Carroll N. Kirk, halfback
- Will Knowlton
- Bernard Murphy
- Aaron Seidel
- Walter "Stub" Stewart, quarterback
- Isaac Stutsman
- Roy A. White, end and captain
