= 1908 Northwestern Purple football team =

American college football season

1908 Northwestern Purple football
- Conference: Western Conference
- Record: 2–2 (0–2 Western)
- Head coach: Alton Johnson (1st season)
- Captain: Dave August
- Home stadium: Northwestern Field

1908 Western Conference football standings
	Conf.					Overall
Team	W		L		T	W		L		T
Chicago $	5	–	0	–	0	5	–	0	–	1
Illinois	4	–	1	–	0	5	–	1	–	1
Wisconsin	2	–	1	–	0	5	–	1	–	0
Indiana	1	–	3	–	0	2	–	4	–	0
Purdue	1	–	3	–	0	4	–	3	–	0
Iowa	0	–	1	–	0	2	–	5	–	0
Minnesota	0	–	2	–	0	3	–	2	–	1
Northwestern	0	–	2	–	0	2	–	2	–	0
$ – Conference champion

The 1908 Northwestern Purple team represented Northwestern University during the 1908 college football season. In their first and only year under head coach Alton Johnson, and following a two-year hiatus in which Northwestern did not field a football team, the Purple compiled a 2–2 record (0–2 against Western Conference opponents) and finished in last place in the Western Conference.

== Schedule ==
Date	Opponent	Site	Result
October 10	Northwestern alumni*	Northwestern Field; Evanston, IL	W 10–6
October 24	Beloit*	Northwestern Field; Evanston, IL	W 44–4
November 7	Purdue	Northwestern Field; Evanston, IL	L 10–16
November 21	at Illinois	Illinois Field; Champaign, IL (rivalry)	L 8–14
*Non-conference game
