= 1907 Wisconsin Badgers football team =

American college football season

1907 Wisconsin Badgers football
- Conference: Western Conference
- Record: 3–1–1 (3–1–1 Western)
- Head coach: Charles P. Hutchins (2nd season)
- Captain: John Messmer
- Home stadium: Randall Field

1907 Western Conference football standings
| | Conf. | | | | | Overall |
| Team | W | | L | | T | W | | L | | T |
|---|---|---|---|---|---|---|---|---|---|---|
| Chicago $ | 4 | – | 0 | – | 0 | 4 | – | 1 | – | 0 |
| Wisconsin | 3 | – | 1 | – | 1 | 3 | – | 1 | – | 1 |
| Illinois | 3 | – | 2 | – | 0 | 3 | – | 2 | – | 0 |
| Iowa | 1 | – | 1 | – | 0 | 3 | – | 2 | – | 0 |
| Minnesota | 0 | – | 1 | – | 1 | 2 | – | 2 | – | 1 |
| Indiana | 0 | – | 3 | – | 0 | 2 | – | 3 | – | 1 |
| Purdue | 0 | – | 3 | – | 0 | 0 | – | 5 | – | 0 |
$ – Conference champion

The 1907 Wisconsin Badgers football team represented the University of Wisconsin as a member of the Western Conference during the 1907 college football season. Led by Charles P. Hutchins in his second and final season as head coach, the Badgers compiled an overall record of 3–1–1 with an identical mark in conference play, placing second in the Western Conference. The team's captain was John Messmer.

== Schedule ==
| Date | Opponent | Site | Result |
|---|---|---|---|
| October 26 | Illinois | Randall Field; Madison, WI | L 4–15 |
| November 2 | at Iowa | Iowa Field; Iowa City, IA (rivalry) | W 6–5 |
| November 9 | Indiana | Randall Field; Madison, WI | W 12–6 |
| November 16 | at Purdue | Stuart Field; West Lafayette, IN | W 12–6 |
| November 23 | Minnesota | Randall Field; Madison, WI (rivalry) | T 17–17 |
