= Arthur R. Hutchens =

American football quarterback and referee

Profile
- Position: Quarterback

Career information
- College: Purdue (1908)

Arthur R. Hutchens was a college football player and referee, once Secretary of the Southern Officials association, and later the Football Rules Committee. Hutchens played as a substitute quarterback for Purdue University in 1908.
