= 1908 Kansas Jayhawks football team =

American college football season

1908 Kansas Jayhawks football

MVIAA champion
- Conference: Missouri Valley Intercollegiate Athletic Association
- Record: 9–0 (4–0 MVIAA)
- Head coach: A. R. Kennedy (5th season)
- Captain: G. T. Crowell
- Home stadium: McCook Field

1908 Missouri Valley Conference football standings
	Conf.					Overall
Team	W		L		T	W		L		T
Kansas $	4	–	0	–	0	9	–	0	–	0
Nebraska	2	–	1	–	0	7	–	2	–	1
Iowa State	2	–	1	–	0	6	–	3	–	0
Missouri	3	–	2	–	0	6	–	2	–	0
Drake	1	–	2	–	0	5	–	2	–	0
Washington University	0	–	2	–	0	4	–	4	–	1
Iowa	0	–	4	–	0	2	–	5	–	0
$ – Conference champion

The 1908 Kansas Jayhawks football team was an American football team that represented the University of Kansas as a member of the Missouri Valley Conference (MVC) during the 1908 college football season. In their fifth season under head coach A. R. Kennedy, the Jayhawks compiled a 9–0 overall record and a 4–0 record against conference opponents winning the MVIAA. Kansas shutout five of nine opponents. The season is, as of 2026, the last season the Jayhawks finished undefeated without any ties. It is also the only time in program history, as of 2023, Kansas finished undefeated in conference play. The Jayhawks played their home games at McCook Field in Lawrence, Kansas. G. T. Crowell was the team captain.

== Schedule ==
Date	Time	Opponent	Site	Result	Attendance	Source
September 26		Kansas State Normal*	McCook Field; Lawrence, KS	W 11–0		
October 3		St. Mary's (KS)*	McCook Field; Lawrence, KS	W 24–0		
October 10		Kansas State*	McCook Field; Lawrence, KS (rivalry)	W 12–6		
October 17		Oklahoma*	McCook Field; Lawrence, KS	W 11–0		
October 24		Washington University	McCook Field; Lawrence, KS	W 10–0		
November 7		Washburn*	McCook Field; Lawrence, KS	W 23–0		
November 14		at Nebraska	Antelope Field; Lincoln, NE (rivalry)	W 20–5		
November 21		at Iowa	Iowa Field; Iowa City, IA	W 10–5		
November 26	2:00 p.m.	vs. Missouri	Association Park; Kansas City, MO (rivalry)	W 10–4	13,000	
*Non-conference game
