= 1908 Drake Bulldogs football team =

American college football season

1908 Drake Bulldogs football
- Conference: Missouri Valley Conference
- Record: 6–2 (1–2 MVC)
- Head coach: John L. Griffith (1st season)
- Home stadium: Haskins Field

1908 Missouri Valley Conference football standings
	Conf.					Overall
Team	W		L		T	W		L		T
Kansas $	4	–	0	–	0	9	–	0	–	0
Nebraska	2	–	1	–	0	7	–	2	–	1
Iowa State	2	–	1	–	0	6	–	3	–	0
Missouri	3	–	2	–	0	6	–	2	–	0
Drake	1	–	2	–	0	5	–	2	–	0
Washington University	0	–	2	–	0	4	–	4	–	1
Iowa	0	–	4	–	0	2	–	5	–	0
$ – Conference champion

The 1908 Drake Bulldogs football team was an American football team that represented Drake University in the Missouri Valley Conference (MVC) during the 1908 college football season. In its first season under head coach John L. Griffith, the team compiled a 6–2 record (1–2 against MVC opponents), finished in fifth place in the conference, and outscored all opponents by a total of 108 to 29.

The team played its home games at Haskins Field.

== Schedule ==
Date	Opponent	Site	Result	Source
October 3	Drake alumni*	Haskins Field; Des Moines, IA	W 4–0	
October 10	Leander Clark*	Haskins Field; Des Moines, IA	W 45–0	
October 17	at Coe*	Cedar Rapids, IA	W 18–0	
October 24	Grinnell*	Haskins Field; Des Moines, IA	W 9–0	
October 31	at Washburn*	Topeka, KS	W 6–0	
November 7	Missouri	Haskins Field; Des Moines, IA	L 8–11	
November 14	at Iowa	Iowa Field; Iowa City, IA	W 12–6	
November 26	Iowa State	Haskins Field; Des Moines, IA	L 6–12	
*Non-conference game
