= 1907 Washington University football team =

American college football season

1907 Washington University football
- Conference: Missouri Valley Conference
- Record: 1–5–1 (0–1 MVC)
- Head coach: J. Merrill Blanchard (2nd season)
- Captain: Harry Castlen
- Home stadium: Washington University Stadium / Francis Field

1907 Missouri Valley Conference football standings
	Conf.					Overall
Team	W		L		T	W		L		T
Iowa +	1	–	0	–	0	3	–	2	–	0
Nebraska +	1	–	0	–	0	8	–	2	–	0
Kansas	1	–	1	–	0	5	–	3	–	0
Missouri	1	–	2	–	0	7	–	2	–	0
Washington University	0	–	1	–	0	1	–	5	–	1
+ – Conference co-champions

The 1907 Washington University football team represented Washington University in St. Louis as a member of the newly-formed Missouri Valley Conference (MVC) during the 1907 college football season. Led by J. Merrill Blanchard in his second and final season as head coach, the team compiled an overall record of 1–5–1 with a mark of 0–1 in conference play, placing last out of five teams in the MVC. Washington University played home games in St. Louis at Washington University Stadium, which was renamed as Francis Field in October 1907, and is now known as Francis Olympic Field.

== Schedule ==
Date	Time	Opponent	Site	Result	Attendance	Source
October 5		Carbondale Normal*	Washington University Stadium; St. Louis, MO	T 0–0	200	
October 12	3:00 p.m.	Shurtleff*	Washington University Stadium; St. Louis, MO	L 0–5		
October 19	3:00 p.m.	Drury*	Washington University Stadium; St. Louis, MO	L 5–6		
October 26	3:00 p.m.	Cape Girardeau Normal*	Francis Field; St. Louis, MO	W 34–0		
November 2	2:30 p.m.	at Saint Louis*	Sportsman's Park; St. Louis, MO	L 0–78	6,000	
November 9	2:30 p.m.	Missouri Mines*	Francis Field; St. Louis, MO	L 8–11		
November 16		at Missouri	Rollins Field; Columbia, MO	L 0–27		
*Non-conference game
