= 1907 Chicago Maroons football team =

American college football season

1907 Chicago Maroons football
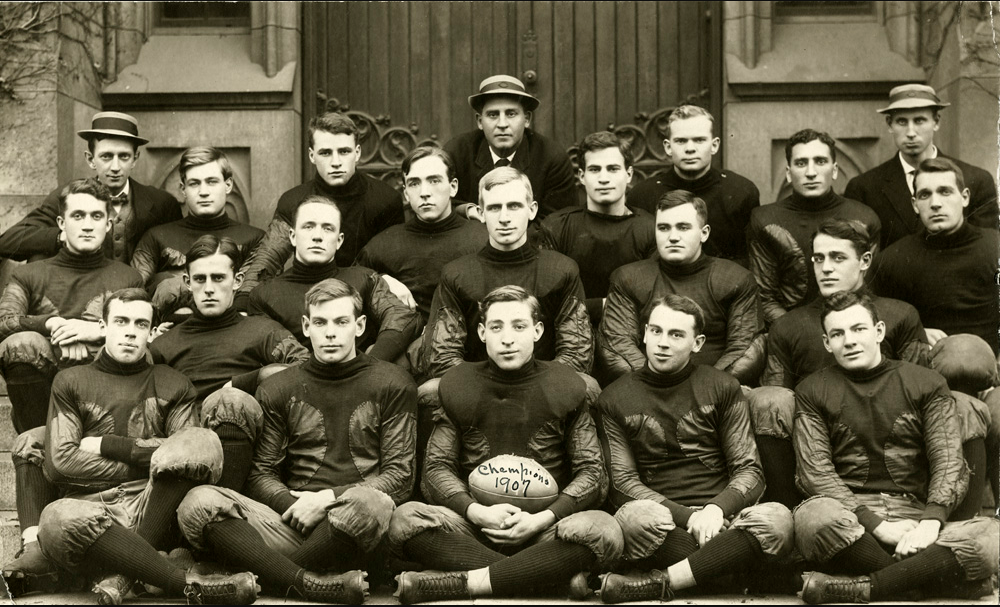

Western Conference champion
- Conference: Western Conference
- Record: 4–1 (4–0 Western)
- Head coach: Amos Alonzo Stagg (16th season)
- Captain: Leo DeTray
- Home stadium: Marshall Field

1907 Western Conference football standings
	Conf.					Overall
Team	W		L		T	W		L		T
Chicago $	4	–	0	–	0	4	–	1	–	0
Wisconsin	3	–	1	–	1	3	–	1	–	1
Illinois	3	–	2	–	0	3	–	2	–	0
Iowa	1	–	1	–	0	3	–	2	–	0
Minnesota	0	–	1	–	1	2	–	2	–	1
Indiana	0	–	3	–	0	2	–	3	–	1
Purdue	0	–	3	–	0	0	–	5	–	0
$ – Conference champion

The 1907 Chicago Maroons football team was an American football team that represented the University of Chicago during the 1907 college football season. In their 16th season under head coach Amos Alonzo Stagg, the Maroons compiled a 4–1 record, finished in first place in the Western Conference with a 4–0 record against conference opponents, and outscored all opponents by a combined total of 147 to 42.

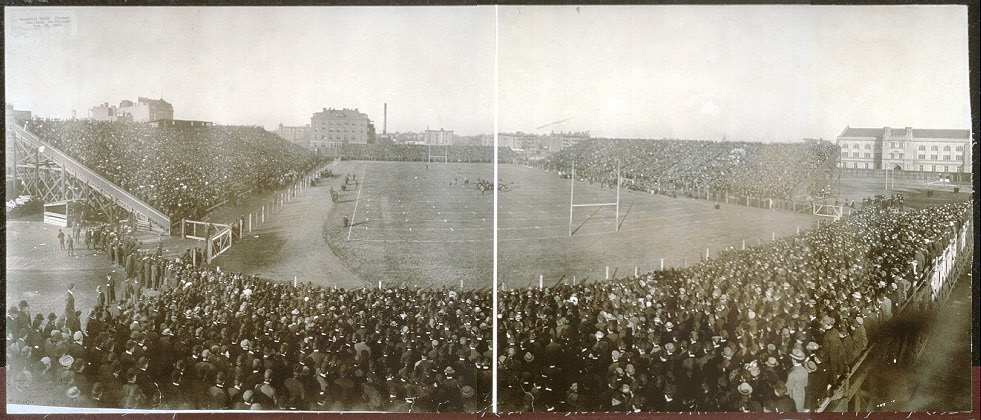
Carlisle–Chicago game

== Schedule ==
Date	Opponent	Site	Result	Attendance	Source
October 12	Indiana	Marshall Field; Chicago, IL	W 27–6		
October 19	at Illinois	Illinois Field; Champaign, IL	W 42–6		
November 2	at Minnesota	Northrop Field; Minneapolis, MN	W 18–12	18,000	
November 9	Purdue	Marshall Field; Chicago, IL (rivalry)	W 56–0		
November 23	Carlisle*	Marshall Field; Chicago, IL	L 4–18		
*Non-conference game

== Roster ==
Player	Position	Weight
Leo DeTray (captain)	left halfback	175
John E. Anderson	center	180
Ivan Doseff	left tackle	194
Louis Theodore Falk	right tackle	180
Ben Meyer Ferguson	fullback	181
Fred Russell Handy	left guard	217
Robert Sachs Harris	right guard	174
William Francis Hewitt	left end	178
A. C. Hoffman	guard, tackle	176
Harold Iddings	right halfback	158
Wellington Downing Jones	left guard	175
Ned Merriam	fullback	163
Elton James Moulton	guard, tackle	175
Harlan Page	right end	148
Max Spencer Rohde	guard	169
John Schommer	end	173
Walter Steffen	quarterback	156
Oscar William Worthwine	guard	169
Herman John Ehrhorn	substitute	161
William Joseph Sunderland	substitute	156
Nicolai B. Johnson	trainer

- Head coach: Amos Alonzo Stagg (16th year at Chicago)
