= 1908 Indiana Hoosiers football team =

American college football season

1908 Indiana Hoosiers football
- Conference: Western Conference
- Record: 3–4 (1–3 Western)
- Head coach: James M. Sheldon (4th season)
- Captain: Scott Paddock
- Home stadium: Jordan Field

1908 Western Conference football standings
	Conf.					Overall
Team	W		L		T	W		L		T
Chicago $	5	–	0	–	0	5	–	0	–	1
Illinois	4	–	1	–	0	5	–	1	–	1
Wisconsin	2	–	1	–	0	5	–	1	–	0
Indiana	1	–	3	–	0	2	–	4	–	0
Purdue	1	–	3	–	0	4	–	3	–	0
Iowa	0	–	1	–	0	2	–	5	–	0
Minnesota	0	–	2	–	0	3	–	2	–	1
Northwestern	0	–	2	–	0	2	–	2	–	0
$ – Conference champion

The 1908 Indiana Hoosiers football team was an American football team that represented Indiana University Bloomington during the 1908 college football season. In their fourth season under head coach James M. Sheldon, the Hoosiers compiled a 3–4 record, finished in a tie for fourth place in the Western Conference, and were outscored by their opponents by a combined total of 70 to 43.

== Schedule ==
Date	Opponent	Site	Result
September 26	Indiana alumni*	Jordan Field; Bloomington, IN	W 11–0
October 3	DePauw*	Jordan Field; Bloomington, IN	W 16–0
October 10	at Chicago	Marshall Field; Chicago, IL	L 6–29
October 17	Wisconsin	Jordan Field; Bloomington, IN	L 0–16
October 31	at Illinois	Illinois Field; Champaign, IL (rivalry)	L 0–10
November 7	vs. Notre Dame*	Washington Park; Indianapolis, IN	L 0–11
November 21	at Purdue	Stuart Field; West Lafayette, IN (rivalry)	W 10–4
*Non-conference game
