= 1907 Purdue Boilermakers football team =

American college football season

1907 Purdue Boilermakers football
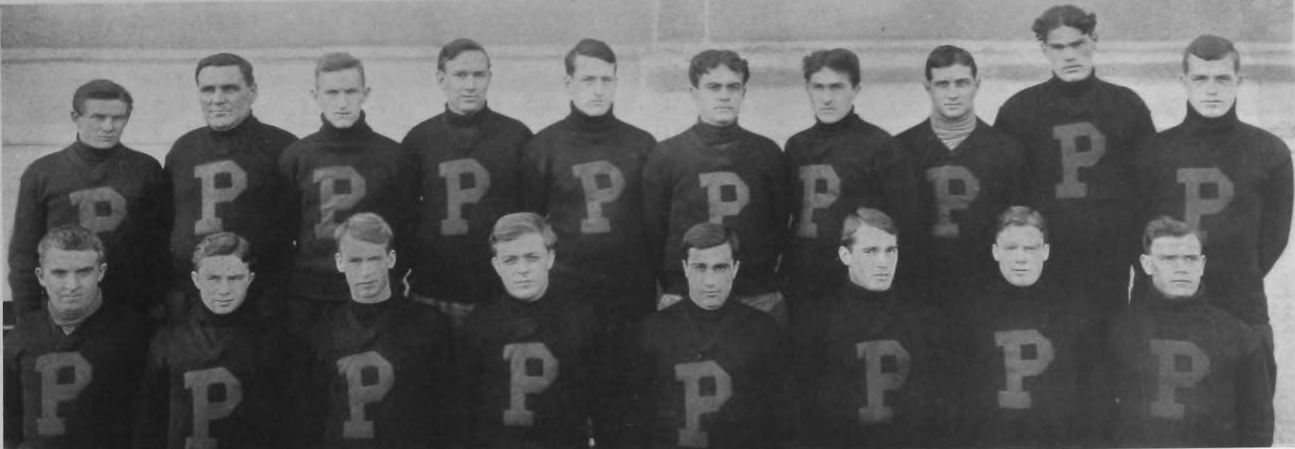
- Conference: Western Conference
- Record: 0–5 (0–3 Western)
- Head coach: Leigh C. Turner (1st season)
- Captain: J. M. Berkheiser
- Home stadium: Stuart Field

1907 Western Conference football standings
	Conf.					Overall
Team	W		L		T	W		L		T
Chicago $	4	–	0	–	0	4	–	1	–	0
Wisconsin	3	–	1	–	1	3	–	1	–	1
Illinois	3	–	2	–	0	3	–	2	–	0
Iowa	1	–	1	–	0	3	–	2	–	0
Minnesota	0	–	1	–	1	2	–	2	–	1
Indiana	0	–	3	–	0	2	–	3	–	1
Purdue	0	–	3	–	0	0	–	5	–	0
$ – Conference champion

The 1907 Purdue Boilermakers football team was an American football team that represented Purdue University during the 1907 college football season. In their first season under head coach Leigh C. Turner, the Boilermakers compiled an 0–5 record, finished in last place in the Western Conference with an 0–3 record against conference opponents, and were outscored by their opponents by a total of 108 to 10. J. M. Berkheiser was the team captain.

== Schedule ==
Date	Opponent	Site	Result	Source
October 12	Wabash*	Stuart Field; West Lafayette, IN	L 0–2	
November 2	at Illinois	Illinois Field; Champaign, IL (rivalry)	L 4–21	
November 9	at Chicago	Stagg Field; Chicago, IL (rivalry)	L 0–56	
November 16	Wisconsin	Stuart Field; West Lafayette, IN	L 6–12	
November 23	Notre Dame	Stuart Field; West Lafayette, IN (rivalry)	L 0–17	
*Non-conference game

== Roster ==
- J. M. Berkheiser, G
- M. J. Brundige, T
- R. N. Forsythe, QB
- Bruce Funk, HB
- M. S. Gardiner, HB
- B. A. Gordon
- W. H. Hanna, QB
- B. H. Hewitt, E
- E. R. Holdson, QB
- Asher Holloway, HB
- E. T. Kirk, C
- Edward Lickey, G
- W. Longebaugh, E
- J. W. McFarland, FB
- Harry Merrill, FB
- J. F. Reed, HB
- G. H. Sage, T
- R. S. Shade, HB
- W. Paul Spencer, E
- Walter Steffens, T
- George Torrence, T
- F. B. Watt, G
