= 1908 Washington University football team =

American college football season

1908 Washington University football
- Conference: Missouri Valley Conference
- Record: 4–4–1 (0–2 MVC)
- Head coach: Frank Cayou (1st season)
- Home stadium: Francis Field

1908 Missouri Valley Conference football standings
	Conf.					Overall
Team	W		L		T	W		L		T
Kansas $	4	–	0	–	0	9	–	0	–	0
Nebraska	2	–	1	–	0	7	–	2	–	1
Iowa State	2	–	1	–	0	6	–	3	–	0
Missouri	3	–	2	–	0	6	–	2	–	0
Drake	1	–	2	–	0	5	–	2	–	0
Washington University	0	–	2	–	0	4	–	4	–	1
Iowa	0	–	4	–	0	2	–	5	–	0
$ – Conference champion

The 1908 Washington University Pikers football team represented Washington University in St. Louis as a member of the Missouri Valley Conference (MVC) during the 1908 college football season. Led by first-year head coach Frank Cayou, the team compiled an overall record of 4–4–1 with a mark of 0–2 in conference play, placing sixth in the MVC. Washington University played home games at Francis Field in St. Louis.

== Schedule ==
Date	Time	Opponent	Site	Result	Attendance	Source
October 3	2:15 p.m.	Carleton College (MO)*	Francis Field; St. Louis, MO	T 0–0		
October 10	2:30 p.m.	Shurtleff*	Francis Field; St. Louis, MO	W 24–6		
October 17	3:00 p.m.	Knox*	Francis Field; St. Louis, MO	W 12–6		
October 24		at Kansas	McCook Field; Lawrence, KS	L 0–10		
October 31	3:00 p.m.	Rose Polytechnic*	Francis Field; St. Louis, MO	W 11–6		
November 7	3:00 p.m.	Millikin*	Francis Field; St. Louis, MO	W 16–0		
November 14		at Missouri	Rollins Field; Columbia, MO	L 0–40		
November 21	3:00 p.m.	Vanderbilt*	Francis Field; St. Louis, MO	L 0–28	6,000	
November 26	2:30 p.m.	at Tulane*	Pelican Park; New Orleans, LA	L 0–11		
*Non-conference game
