= 1907 Kansas Jayhawks football team =

American college football season

1907 Kansas Jayhawks football
- Conference: Missouri Valley Conference
- Record: 5–3 (1–1 MVC)
- Head coach: A. R. Kennedy (4th season)
- Captain: Carl Rouse
- Home stadium: McCook Field

1907 Missouri Valley Conference football standings
	Conf.					Overall
Team	W		L		T	W		L		T
Iowa +	1	–	0	–	0	3	–	2	–	0
Nebraska +	1	–	0	–	0	8	–	2	–	0
Kansas	1	–	1	–	0	5	–	3	–	0
Missouri	1	–	2	–	0	7	–	2	–	0
Washington University	0	–	1	–	0	1	–	5	–	1
+ – Conference co-champions

The 1907 Kansas Jayhawks football team was an American football that represented the University of Kansas as a member of the Missouri Valley Conference (MVC) during the 1907 college football season. In their fourth season under head coach A. R. Kennedy, the Jayhawks compiled a 5–3 record (1–1 against conference opponents), finished in third place in the MVC, and outscored opponents by a total of 111 to 57. The Jayhawks played home games at McCook Field in Lawrence, Kansas. Carl Rouse was the team captain.

== Schedule ==
Date	Opponent	Site	Result	Attendance	Source
October 5	William Jewell*	McCook Field; Lawrence, KS	W 38–0		
October 12	St. Mary's (KS)*	McCook Field; Lawrence, KS	W 14–2		
October 19	at Oklahoma*	Boyd Field; Norman, Oklahoma Territory	W 15–0	1,400	
October 26	Kansas State*	McCook Field; Lawrence, KS (rivalry)	W 29–10		
November 2	at Washburn*	Washburn Field; Topeka, KS	L 5–12		
November 9	Nebraska	McCook Field; Lawrence, KS (rivalry)	L 6–16		
November 16	at Saint Louis*	Sportsman's Park; St. Louis, MO	L 0–17		
November 28	vs. Missouri	League Park; St. Joseph, MO (rivalry)	W 4–0	15,000	
*Non-conference game
