= 1908 Nebraska Cornhuskers football team =

American college football season

1908 Nebraska Cornhuskers football
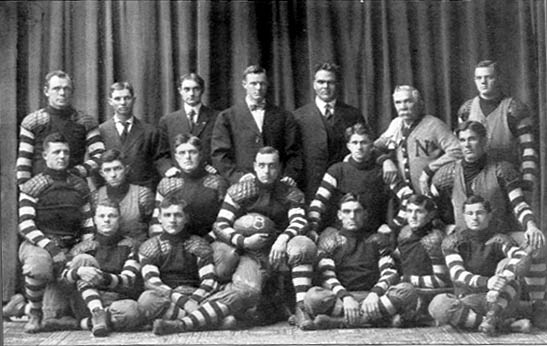
- Conference: Missouri Valley Conference
- Record: 7–2–1 (1–1 MVC)
- Head coach: William C. "King" Cole (2nd season)
- Home stadium: Antelope Park

1908 Missouri Valley Conference football standings
	Conf.					Overall
Team	W		L		T	W		L		T
Kansas $	4	–	0	–	0	9	–	0	–	0
Nebraska	2	–	1	–	0	7	–	2	–	1
Iowa State	2	–	1	–	0	6	–	3	–	0
Missouri	3	–	2	–	0	6	–	2	–	0
Drake	1	–	2	–	0	5	–	2	–	0
Washington University	0	–	2	–	0	4	–	4	–	1
Iowa	0	–	4	–	0	2	–	5	–	0
$ – Conference champion

The 1908 Nebraska Cornhuskers football team represented the University of Nebraska as a member of the Missouri Valley Conference (MVC) during the 1908 college football season. The team was coached by second-year head coach William C. "King" Cole and played its home games at Antelope Park in Lincoln, Nebraska.

Following the 1908 season, the university constructed Nebraska Field, located on campus adjacent to where Memorial Stadium was later built.

== Schedule ==
Date	Time	Opponent	Site	Result	Attendance	Source
September 26		Peru Normal*	Antelope Park; Lincoln, NE	W 20–0		
October 3		Doane*	Antelope Park; Lincoln, NE	W 43–0		
October 10		Grinnell*	Antelope Park; Lincoln, NE	W 20–5		
October 17		at Minnesota*	Northrop Field; Minneapolis, MN (rivalry)	T 0–0	12,000	
October 24		Haskell*	Antelope Park; Lincoln, NE	W 10–0		
October 31		at Iowa*	Iowa Field; Iowa City, IA (rivalry)	W 11–8		
November 7	3:00 p.m.	vs. Iowa State	Dietz Park; Omaha, NE (rivalry)	W 23–17	8,000	
November 14		Kansas	Antelope Park; Lincoln, NE (rivalry)	L 5–20		
November 26	2:30 p.m.	Wabash*	Antelope Park; Lincoln, NE	W 27–6		
December 2	2:30 p.m.	Carlisle*	Antelope Park; Lincoln, NE	L 6–37	2,000	
*Non-conference game

== Coaching staff ==
Coach	Position	First year	Alma mater
William C. "King" Cole	Head coach	1907	Marietta
Jack Best	Trainer	1890	Nebraska

== Roster ==
Beltzer, Oren HB
Bentley, Orlando QB
Birkner, Hugo HB
Bowers RG
Chaloupka, William T
Collins, Sydney C
Cooke, Harold QB
Ewing, Henry LG
Frum, Sidney RG
Harte, Louis T
Harvey, James E
Hascoll, Vincent QB
Johnson, Frank E
Kroger, Ernest FB
Matters, Thomas T
Miller, A.H. T
Minor, Harry HB
Perrin, Dale C
Slaughter HB
Sturmer, Frederick LT
Sturzenegger, Alfonzo HB
Temple, LeRoy FB
Wolcott, O.M. QB

== Game summaries ==
=== Peru State ===
Peru State at Nebraska

Team	1	2	Total
Peru State			0
• Nebraska			20

- Date: September 26
- Location: Antelope Park, Lincoln, NE

=== Doane ===
Doane at Nebraska

Team	1	2	Total
Doane			0
• Nebraska			43

- Date: October 3
- Location: Antelope Park, Lincoln, NE

=== Grinnell ===
Grinnell at Nebraska

Team	1	2	Total
Grinnell			5
• Nebraska			20

- Date: October 10
- Location: Antelope Park, Lincoln, NE

=== At Minnesota ===
Nebraska at Minnesota

Team	1	2	Total
Nebraska	0	0	0
Minnesota	0	0	0

- Date: October 17
- Location: Northrop Field, Minneapolis, MN

Nebraska again traveled north to face powerhouse Minnesota, ending a four-game losing streak against the Golden Gophers with a goal-line stand to force a scoreless draw.

=== Haskell ===
Haskell at Nebraska

Team	1	2	Total
Haskell			0
• Nebraska			10

- Date: October 24
- Location: Antelope Park, Lincoln, NE

=== Iowa ===
Nebraska at Iowa

Team	1	2	Total
• Nebraska			11
Iowa			8

- Date: October 31
- Location: Iowa City, IA

=== Iowa State ===
Nebraska vs. Iowa State

Team	1	2	Total
• Nebraska			23
Iowa State			17

- Date: November 7
- Location: Dietz Park, Omaha, NE
- Game start: 3:00 PM CT

=== Kansas ===
Kansas at Nebraska

Team	1	2	Total
• Kansas	16	4	20
Nebraska	5	0	5

- Date: November 14
- Location: Antelope Park, Lincoln, NE

Kansas gave Nebraska its first home loss since 1906. After the game, Nebraska players accused Kansas of spying on team practices or otherwise improperly obtaining NU team signals, but the game result stood and gave the Jayhawks the MVIAA championship.

=== Wabash ===
Wabash at Nebraska

Team	1	2	Total
Wabash			6
• Nebraska			27

- Date: November 26
- Location: Antelope Park, Lincoln, NE
- Game start: 2:30 PM CT
- Game weather: Snow

=== Carlisle ===
Carlisle at Nebraska

Team	1	2	Total
• Carlisle			37
Nebraska			6

- Date: December 2
- Location: Antelope Park, Lincoln, NE
- Game start: 2:30 PM CT
- Game attendance: 2,000

For the second consecutive week, Nebraska hosted a team it would play only once in program history. The meeting was arranged to bring the heralded Jim Thorpe to Lincoln, and though Thorpe reportedly struggled, Carlisle dominated the game.
