= 1908 Chicago Maroons football team =

American college football season

1908 Chicago Maroons football
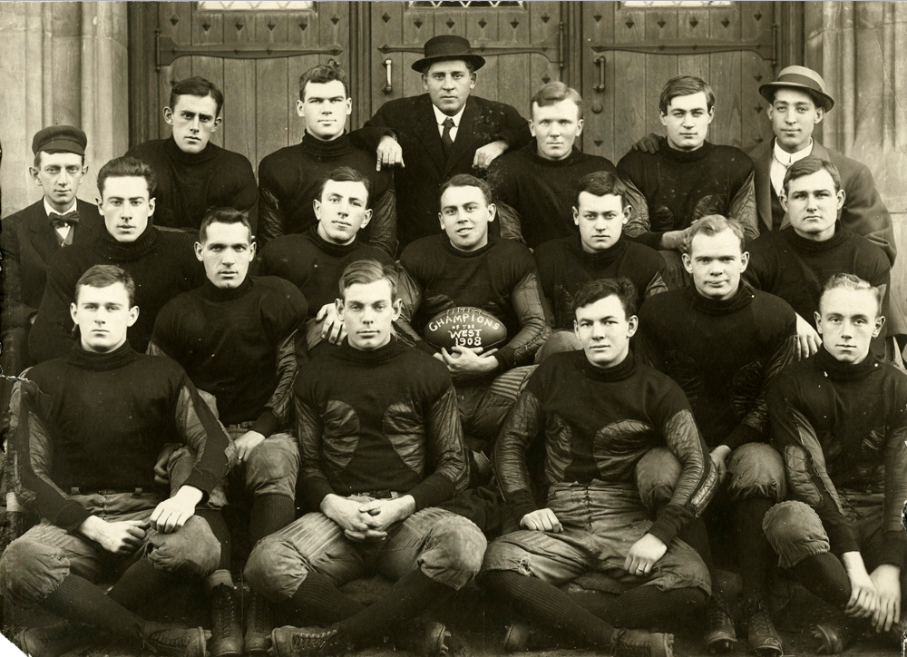

Western Conference champion
- Conference: Western Conference
- Record: 5–0–1 (5–0 Western)
- Head coach: Amos Alonzo Stagg (17th season)
- Base defense: 7–2–2
- Captain: Walter Steffen
- Home stadium: Marshall Field

1908 Western Conference football standings
	Conf.					Overall
Team	W		L		T	W		L		T
Chicago $	5	–	0	–	0	5	–	0	–	1
Illinois	4	–	1	–	0	5	–	1	–	1
Wisconsin	2	–	1	–	0	5	–	1	–	0
Indiana	1	–	3	–	0	2	–	4	–	0
Purdue	1	–	3	–	0	4	–	3	–	0
Iowa	0	–	1	–	0	2	–	5	–	0
Minnesota	0	–	2	–	0	3	–	2	–	1
Northwestern	0	–	2	–	0	2	–	2	–	0
$ – Conference champion

The 1908 Chicago Maroons football team was an American football team that represented the University of Chicago during the 1908 college football season. In their 17th season under head coach Amos Alonzo Stagg, the Maroons compiled a 5–0–1 record, won the Western Conference championship, and outscored opponents by a total of 132 to 30.

Quarterback Walter Steffen was the team captain. Four Chicago players received first-team honors on the 1908 All-Western college football team: end Harlan Page, halfback William Lucas Crawley, fullback, Oscar William Worthwine, and center Benjamin Harrison Badenoch.

== Schedule ==
Date	Opponent	Site	Result	Attendance	Source
October 3	Purdue	Marshall Field; Chicago, IL (rivalry)	W 39–0		
October 10	Indiana	Marshall Field; Chicago, IL	W 29–6		
October 17	Illinois	Marshall Field; Chicago, IL	W 11–5	8,000	
October 31	Minnesota	Marshall Field; Chicago, IL	W 29–0	15,000	
November 14	Cornell*	Marshall Field; Chicago, IL	T 6–6		
November 21	at Wisconsin	Randall Field; Madison, WI	W 18–12		
*Non-conference game; Source:

== Roster ==
Player	Position	Weight
Walter Steffen (captain)	quarterback	157
Benjamin Harrison Badenoch	center	169
William Lucas Crawley	right halfback	170
Herman John Ehrhorn	left guard	167
Raymond Davis Elliott	right guard	162
Louis Theodore Falk	right tackle	177
Marcus Andrew Hirschl	right tackle	168
A. C. Hoffman	left tackle	179
Harold Iddings	right halfback	158
Thomas Kelley	right tackle	190
Harlan Page	right end	149
Rufus Boynton Rogers	end, halfback	151
John Schommer	left end	169
Harry Johnson Schott	fullback	171
Oscar William Worthwine	fullback	166
Nicolai B. Johnson	trainer

- Head coach: Amos Alonzo Stagg (17th year at Chicago)
