= W. J. Monilaw =

American football coach and administrator (1874–1964)

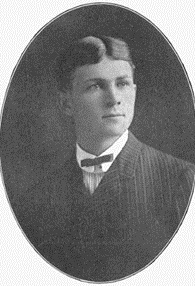
- Monilaw from The Savitar, 1907

Biographical details
- Born: July 22, 1874
- Died: July 18, 1964 (aged 89); Highland Park, Illinois, U.S.

Playing career

Football
- ?: Drake

Coaching career (HC unless noted)

Football
- 1903–1904: Drake
- 1906–1908: Missouri

Track and field
- 1907–1910: Missouri

Administrative career (AD unless noted)
- 1897–1906: Drake
- 1909–1910: Missouri

Head coaching record
- Overall: 28–13–1 (football)

William James Monilaw (July 22, 1874 – July 18, 1964) was an American football and track and field coach and college athletics administrator. He served at the head football coach at Drake University from 1903 to 1904 and at the University of Missouri from 1906 to 1908, compiling a career college football record of 28–13–1. Later, he became a physician who advocated for the health and safety of children in athletics.

== Early life ==
Molinaw attended Cedar Rapids High School in Cedar Rapids, Iowa, and was later accepted into Drake University.

== Coaching career ==
=== Drake ===
Monilaw got his first coaching job as the seventh head coach for his alma mater, Drake University, for two seasons, from 1903 until 1904. His coaching record at Drake was 10–7.

=== Missouri ===
From 1906 to 1908, he served as the head football coach at the University of Missouri in Columbia, Missouri, where he compiled an 18–6–1 record. Monilaw was the 12th head coach for Mizzou.

== Medical School and Post at University of Chicago ==
Monilaw completed medical school at Drake University, where he decided to coach football rather than pursue a career in medicine. In 1909, he was recruited to the University of Chicago, where he served as Medical Examiner and Physical Director at the University of Chicago Laboratory School (U-high) from 1910 to 1925. He continued coaching and advocating for health and sportsmanship for students when in 1917, he wrote an article for the University of Chicago Press titled The Effects of Training Down in Weight on the Growing Boy and How to Control or Abolish the Practice.

The Monilaw Medal was created by him in 1916 and awarded to the senior boy rated highest by the physical education faculty in athletic ability, citizenship and scholarship. It was the highest possible achievement for male athletes at the high-school and the legacy lives on in the students who remember how they learned to appreciate sports and sportsmanship while in high school.

== Head coaching record ==
=== Football ===
Year	Team	Overall	Conference	Standing
Drake Bulldogs (Independent) (1903–1904)
1903	Drake	5–3		
1904	Drake	5–4		
Drake:		10–7		
Missouri Tigers (Independent) (1906)
1906	Missouri	5–2–1		
Missouri Tigers (Missouri Valley Intercollegiate Athletic Association) (1907–1908)
1907	Missouri	7–2	1–2	4th
1908	Missouri	6–2	3–2	4th
Missouri:		18–6–1	4–4	
Total:		28–13–1		
