= 1907 Missouri Tigers football team =

American college football season

1907 Missouri Tigers football
- Conference: Missouri Valley Conference
- Record: 7–2 (1–2 MVC)
- Head coach: W. J. Monilaw (2nd season)
- Captain: Edwin L. Miller
- Home stadium: Rollins Field

1907 Missouri Valley Conference football standings
	Conf.					Overall
Team	W		L		T	W		L		T
Iowa +	1	–	0	–	0	3	–	2	–	0
Nebraska +	1	–	0	–	0	8	–	2	–	0
Kansas	1	–	1	–	0	5	–	3	–	0
Missouri	1	–	2	–	0	7	–	2	–	0
Washington University	0	–	1	–	0	1	–	5	–	1
+ – Conference co-champions

The 1907 Missouri Tigers football team was an American football team that represented the University of Missouri in the Missouri Valley Conference (MVC) during the 1907 college football season. The team compiled an overall record of 7–2 record with a mark of 1–1 against conference opponents, placed fourth in the MVC, and outscored all opponents by a combined total of 278 to 41. W. J. Monilaw was the head coach for the second of three seasons. The team played its home games at Rollins Field in Columbia, Missouri.

== Schedule ==
Date	Opponent	Site	Result	Attendance	Source
October 5	Central (MO)*	Rollins Field; Columbia, MO	W 39–0		
October 9	at Central (MO)*	Johnson Athletic Field; Fayette, MO	W 46–0		
October 12	Warrensburg Teachers*	Rollins Field; Columbia, MO	W 38–6		
October 19	at Iowa	Iowa Field; Iowa City, IA	L 6–21		
October 26	William Jewell*	Rollins Field; Columbia, MO	W 47–0		
November 2	Texas*	Rollins Field; Columbia, MO	W 5–4		
November 9	Tarkio*	Rollins Field; Columbia, MO	W 70–6		
November 16	Washington University	Rollins Field; Columbia, MO	W 27–0		
November 28	vs. Kansas	League Park; St. Joseph, MO (rivalry)	L 0–4	15,000	
*Non-conference game
