= 1907 Indiana Hoosiers football team =

American college football season

1907 Indiana Hoosiers football
- Conference: Western Conference
- Record: 2–3–1 (0–3 Western)
- Head coach: James M. Sheldon (3rd season)
- Captain: Charles Tighe
- Home stadium: Jordan Field

1907 Western Conference football standings
| | Conf. | | | | | Overall |
| Team | W | | L | | T | W | | L | | T |
|---|---|---|---|---|---|---|---|---|---|---|
| Chicago $ | 4 | – | 0 | – | 0 | 4 | – | 1 | – | 0 |
| Wisconsin | 3 | – | 1 | – | 1 | 3 | – | 1 | – | 1 |
| Illinois | 3 | – | 2 | – | 0 | 3 | – | 2 | – | 0 |
| Iowa | 1 | – | 1 | – | 0 | 3 | – | 2 | – | 0 |
| Minnesota | 0 | – | 1 | – | 1 | 2 | – | 2 | – | 1 |
| Indiana | 0 | – | 3 | – | 0 | 2 | – | 3 | – | 1 |
| Purdue | 0 | – | 3 | – | 0 | 0 | – | 5 | – | 0 |
$ – Conference champion

The 1907 Indiana Hoosiers football team was an American football team that represented Indiana University Bloomington during the 1907 college football season. In their third season under head coach James M. Sheldon, the Hoosiers compiled a 4–2 record, finished in a tie for last place in the Western Conference, and outscored their opponents by a combined total of 85 to 57.

== Schedule ==
| Date | Opponent | Site | Result |
|---|---|---|---|
| October 5 | DePauw* | Jordan Field; Bloomington, IN | W 25–9 |
| October 12 | at Chicago | Marshall Field; Chicago, IL | L 6–27 |
| October 19 | Indiana alumni | Jordan Field; Bloomington, IN | W 40–0 |
| November 2 | at Notre Dame | Cartier Field; Notre Dame, IN | T 0–0 |
| November 9 | at Wisconsin | Randall Field; Madison, WI | L 8–11 |
| November 22 | Illinois* | Jordan Field; Bloomington, IN (rivalry) | L 6–10 |
*Non-conference game
