= 1908 Wisconsin Badgers football team =

American college football season

1908 Wisconsin Badgers football
- Conference: Western Conference
- Record: 5–1 (2–1 Western)
- Head coach: Thomas A. Barry (1st season)
- Captain: Harlan Rogers
- Home stadium: Randall Field

1908 Western Conference football standings
	Conf.					Overall
Team	W		L		T	W		L		T
Chicago $	5	–	0	–	0	5	–	0	–	1
Illinois	4	–	1	–	0	5	–	1	–	1
Wisconsin	2	–	1	–	0	5	–	1	–	0
Indiana	1	–	3	–	0	2	–	4	–	0
Purdue	1	–	3	–	0	4	–	3	–	0
Iowa	0	–	1	–	0	2	–	5	–	0
Minnesota	0	–	2	–	0	3	–	2	–	1
Northwestern	0	–	2	–	0	2	–	2	–	0
$ – Conference champion

The 1908 Wisconsin Badgers football team represented the University of Wisconsin as a member of the Western Conference during the 1908 college football season. Led by first-year head coach Thomas A. Barry, the Badgers compiled an overall record of 5–1 with a mark of 2–1 in conference play, placing third in the Western Conference. The team's captain was Harlan Rogers. The final game of the season was the first homecoming game in program history. The Badgers were defeated, 18–12, by the Chicago Maroons.

== Schedule ==
Date	Opponent	Site	Result	Attendance	Source
October 10	Lawrence*	Randall Field; Madison, WI	W 35–0		
October 17	at Indiana	Jordan Field; Bloomington, IN	W 16–0		
October 24	vs. Wisconsin freshmen	Randall Field; Madison, WI	W 24–15		
October 31	Marquette	Randall Field; Madison, WI	W 9–6		
November 7	at Minnesota	Northrop Field; Minneapolis, MN (rivalry)	W 5–0	15,000	
November 21	Chicago^{†}	Randall Field; Madison, WI	L 12–18		
*Non-conference game; ^{†}Homecoming
