= 1908 Minnesota Golden Gophers football team =

American college football season

1908 Minnesota Golden Gophers football
- Conference: Western Conference
- Record: 3–2–1 (0–2 Western)
- Head coach: Henry L. Williams (9th season)
- Captains: Ney Dunn (died before the season); Orren Safford
- Home stadium: Northrop Field

1908 Western Conference football standings
	Conf.					Overall
Team	W		L		T	W		L		T
Chicago $	5	–	0	–	0	5	–	0	–	1
Illinois	4	–	1	–	0	5	–	1	–	1
Wisconsin	2	–	1	–	0	5	–	1	–	0
Indiana	1	–	3	–	0	2	–	4	–	0
Purdue	1	–	3	–	0	4	–	3	–	0
Iowa	0	–	1	–	0	2	–	5	–	0
Minnesota	0	–	2	–	0	3	–	2	–	1
Northwestern	0	–	2	–	0	2	–	2	–	0
$ – Conference champion

The 1908 Minnesota Golden Gophers football team represented the University of Minnesota in the 1908 college football season. In their ninth year under head coach Henry L. Williams, the Golden Gophers compiled a 3–2–1 record (0–2 against Western Conference opponents) and were outscored by all their opponents by a combined total of 50 to 32.

The 1908 season was the first season in which the Minnesota football team was outscored by its season opponents.

Center Orren Safford was named All-Big Ten first team.

== Schedule ==
Date	Opponent	Site	Result	Attendance	Source
October 3	Lawrence*	Northrop Field; Minneapolis, MN	W 6–0	5,000	
October 10	Iowa State*	Northrop Field; Minneapolis, MN	W 15–10	5,000	
October 17	Nebraska*	Northrop Field; Minneapolis, MN (rivalry)	T 0–0	12,000	
October 31	at Chicago	Marshall Field; Chicago, IL	L 0–29	15,000	
November 7	Wisconsin	Northrop Field; Minneapolis, MN (rivalry)	L 0–5	15,000	
November 21	Carlisle*	Northrop Field; Minneapolis, MN	W 11–6	15,000	
*Non-conference game
