= 1907 Nebraska Cornhuskers football team =

American college football season

1907 Nebraska Cornhuskers football
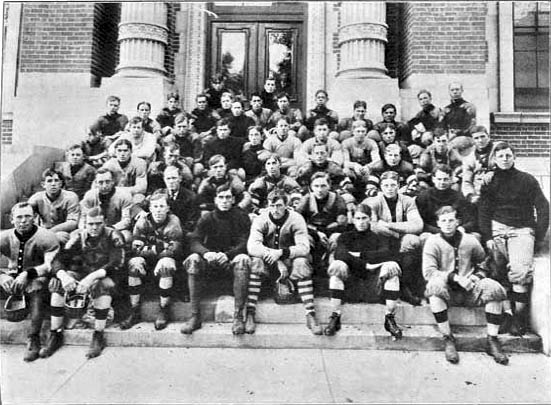

MVC co-champion
- Conference: Missouri Valley Conference
- Record: 8–2 (1–0 MVC)
- Head coach: William C. "King" Cole (1st season)
- Home stadium: Antelope Field

1907 Missouri Valley Conference football standings
	Conf.					Overall
Team	W		L		T	W		L		T
Iowa +	1	–	0	–	0	3	–	2	–	0
Nebraska +	1	–	0	–	0	8	–	2	–	0
Kansas	1	–	1	–	0	5	–	3	–	0
Missouri	1	–	2	–	0	7	–	2	–	0
Washington University	0	–	1	–	0	1	–	5	–	1
+ – Conference co-champions

The 1907 Nebraska Cornhuskers football team represented the University of Nebraska as a member of the Missouri Valley Conference (MVC) during the 1907 college football season. The team was coached by first-year head coach William C. "King" Cole and played its home games at Antelope Field in Lincoln, Nebraska.

Prior to the season, Nebraska joined the MVC, the first time since 1897 the Cornhuskers had been a member of a conference.

== Schedule ==
Date	Time	Opponent	Site	Result	Attendance	Source
September 28		Peru Normal*	Antelope Field; Lincoln, NE	W 53–0		
October 5		South Dakota*	Antelope Field; Lincoln, NE	W 39–0		
October 12		Grinnell*	Antelope Field; Lincoln, NE	W 30–4		
October 19		at Minnesota*	Northrop Field; Minneapolis, MN (rivalry)	L 5–8	8,000	
October 26		Colorado*	Antelope Field; Lincoln, NE (rivalry)	W 22–8		
November 2		Iowa State*	Antelope Field; Lincoln, NE (rivalry)	W 10–9		
November 9		at Kansas	McCook Field; Lawrence, KS (rivalry)	W 16–6		
November 16	2:45 p.m.	Denver*	Antelope Field; Lincoln, NE	W 63–0		
November 23		Doane*	Antelope Field; Lincoln, NE	W 85–0		
November 28		at Saint Louis*	Sportsman's Park; St. Louis, MO	L 0–34		
*Non-conference game

== Game summaries ==
=== Peru Normal ===
Peru State at Nebraska

Team	1	2	Total
Peru Normal			0
• Nebraska			53

- Date: September 28
- Location: Antelope Field, Lincoln, NE

Nebraska held Peru State without a first down in Cole's first game, also the first meeting between the teams.

=== South Dakota ===
South Dakota at Nebraska

Team	1	2	Total
South Dakota	0	0	0
• Nebraska	23	16	39

- Date: October 5
- Location: Antelope Field, Lincoln, NE

=== Grinnell ===
Grinnell at Nebraska

Team	1	2	Total
Grinnell			4
• Nebraska			30

- Date: October 12
- Location: Antelope Field, Lincoln, NE

=== At Minnesota ===
Nebraska at Minnesota

Team	1	2	Total
Nebraska			5
• Minnesota			8

- Date: October 19
- Location: Northrop Field, Minneapolis, MN

Nebraska scored first after a Minnesota fumble, but a pair of field goals gave the Golden Gophers the lead and another victory over NU.

=== Colorado ===
Colorado at Nebraska

Team	1	2	Total
Colorado			8
• Nebraska			22

- Date: October 26
- Location: Antelope Field, Lincoln, NE

=== Iowa State ===
Iowa State at Nebraska

Team	1	2	Total
Iowa State			9
• Nebraska			10

- Date: November 2
- Location: Antelope Field, Lincoln, NE

A second-half touchdown gave Nebraska a 10–9 win over Iowa State. On a late Cyclones field goal attempt, the ball hit the ground short of the uprights and bounced through. Because of this, Iowa State lists this game as a 13–10 victory.

=== At Kansas ===
Nebraska at Kansas

Team	1	2	Total
• Nebraska			16
Kansas			6

- Date: November 9
- Location: McCook Field, Lawrence, KS

This was Nebraska's only conference game in 1907, as the Cornhuskers had recently joined the MVIAA and were unable to schedule the other teams with such short notice. The 16–6 win gave NU a share of the conference title.

=== At Denver ===
Denver at Nebraska

Team	1	2	Total
Denver			0
• Nebraska			63

- Date: November 16
- Location: Antelope Field, Lincoln, NE

=== Doane ===
Doane at Nebraska

Team	1	2	Total
Doane			0
• Nebraska			85

- Date: November 23
- Location: Antelope Field, Lincoln, NE

The Cornhuskers shut out Doane 85–0, the largest margin of victory in Antelope Field history.

=== At Saint Louis ===
Nebraska at Saint Louis

Team	1	2	Total
Nebraska			0
• Saint Louis			34

- Date: November 28
- Location: Sportsman's Park, St. Louis, MO

Saint Louis shut out Nebraska 34–0 in the only meeting between the teams.

== Personnel ==
=== Coaching staff ===
Coach	Position	First year	Alma mater
William C. "King" Cole	Head coach	1907	Marietta
Jack Best	Trainer	1890	Nebraska

=== Roster ===
Baekley PLAYER
Barkley PLAYER
Beltzer, Oren E
Bentley, Orlando QB
Birkner, Hugo HB
Burleigh PLAYER
Chaloupka, William RT
Collins, Sydney C
Cooke, Harold QB
Ewing, Henry LG
Frum, Sidney RG
Harte, Louis RG
Harvey, James E
Johnson, Frank E
Kroger, Ernest FB
Matters, Thomas LT
Miller, A.H. RT
Minor, Harry HB
Patton E
Perrin, Dale C
Price PLAYER
Weller, John HB
