= 1908 Purdue Boilermakers football team =

American college football season

1908 Purdue Boilermakers football
- Conference: Western Conference
- Record: 4–3 (1–3 Western)
- Head coach: Frederick A. Speik (1st season)
- Captain: Asher E. Holloway
- Home stadium: Stuart Field

1908 Western Conference football standings
	Conf.					Overall
Team	W		L		T	W		L		T
Chicago $	5	–	0	–	0	5	–	0	–	1
Illinois	4	–	1	–	0	5	–	1	–	1
Wisconsin	2	–	1	–	0	5	–	1	–	0
Indiana	1	–	3	–	0	2	–	4	–	0
Purdue	1	–	3	–	0	4	–	3	–	0
Iowa	0	–	1	–	0	2	–	5	–	0
Minnesota	0	–	2	–	0	3	–	2	–	1
Northwestern	0	–	2	–	0	2	–	2	–	0
$ – Conference champion

The 1908 Purdue Boilermakers football team was an American football team that represented Purdue University during the 1908 college football season. In their first season under head coach Frederick A. Speik, the Boilermakers compiled a 4–3 record, finished in a tie for fourth place in the Western Conference with a 1–3 record against conference opponents, and outscored their opponents by a total of 124 to 78. Asher E. Holloway was a team captain.

== Schedule ==
Date	Opponent	Site	Result
October 3	at Chicago	Stagg Field; Chicago, IL (rivalry)	L 0–39
October 10	Earlham	Stuart Field; West Lafayette, IN	W 40–0
October 17	Monmouth (IL)	Stuart Field; West Lafayette, IN	W 30–0
October 31	DePauw*	Stuart Field; West Lafayette, IN	W 28–4
November 7	at Northwestern	Northwestern Field; Evanston, IL	W 16–10
November 14	Illinois	Stuart Field; West Lafayette, IN (rivalry)	L 6–15
November 21	Indiana	Stuart Field; West Lafayette, IN (Old Oaken Bucket)	L 4–10
*Non-conference game

== Roster ==
- M. J. Brundige, T
- Bruce Funk, HB
- R. F. Gettinger, FB
- L. H. Goebel, E
- W. H. Hanna, QB
- Arthur R. Hutchens, QB
- Drewry Kassebaum, G
- Edward Lickey, G
- J. W. McFarland, FB
- A. D. Mehegan, HB
- Harry Merrill, FB
- Billy Rockford, HB
- Van Ruffner, G
- R. S. Shade, HB
- R. M. Sparks, G
- Leroy Wyant, E
