= 1908 Missouri Tigers football team =

American college football season

1908 Missouri Tigers football
- Conference: Missouri Valley Conference
- Record: 6–2 (3–2 MVC)
- Head coach: W. J. Monilaw (3rd season)
- Captain: Edwin L. Miller
- Home stadium: Rollins Field

1908 Missouri Valley Conference football standings
	Conf.					Overall
Team	W		L		T	W		L		T
Kansas $	4	–	0	–	0	9	–	0	–	0
Nebraska	2	–	1	–	0	7	–	2	–	1
Iowa State	2	–	1	–	0	6	–	3	–	0
Missouri	3	–	2	–	0	6	–	2	–	0
Drake	1	–	2	–	0	5	–	2	–	0
Washington University	0	–	2	–	0	4	–	4	–	1
Iowa	0	–	4	–	0	2	–	5	–	0
$ – Conference champion

The 1908 Missouri Tigers football team was an American football team that represented the University of Missouri in the Missouri Valley Conference (MVC) during the 1908 college football season. The team compiled a 6–2 record (3–2 against MVC opponents) and outscored all opponents by a combined total of 195 to 45. W. J. Monilaw was the head coach for the third of three seasons. The team played its home games at Rollins Field in Columbia, Missouri.

== Schedule ==
Date	Time	Opponent	Site	Result	Attendance	Source
October 3		Warrensburg Teachers*	Rollins Field; Columbia, MO	W 57–6		
October 10		Missouri Mines*	Rollins Field; Columbia, MO	W 16–0		
October 17		Iowa	Rollins Field; Columbia, MO	W 10–5		
October 24		Westminster (MO)*	Rollins Field; Columbia, MO	W 58–0		
October 31		Iowa State	Rollins Field; Columbia, MO (rivalry)	L 0–16		
November 7		at Drake	Haskins Field; Des Moines, IA	W 11–8		
November 14		Washington University	Rollins Field; Columbia, MO	W 40–0		
November 26	2:00 p.m.	vs. Kansas	Association Park; Kansas City, MO (rivalry)	L 4–10	13,000	
*Non-conference game
