= 1908 Iowa State Cyclones football team =

American college football season

1908 Iowa State Cyclones football
- Conference: Missouri Valley Conference
- Record: 6–3 (2–1 MVC)
- Head coach: Clyde Williams (2nd season)
- Captain: E. W. Law
- Home stadium: State Field

1908 Missouri Valley Conference football standings
	Conf.					Overall
Team	W		L		T	W		L		T
Kansas $	4	–	0	–	0	9	–	0	–	0
Nebraska	2	–	1	–	0	7	–	2	–	1
Iowa State	2	–	1	–	0	6	–	3	–	0
Missouri	3	–	2	–	0	6	–	2	–	0
Drake	1	–	2	–	0	5	–	2	–	0
Washington University	0	–	2	–	0	4	–	4	–	1
Iowa	0	–	4	–	0	2	–	5	–	0
$ – Conference champion

The 1908 Iowa State Cyclones football team represented Iowa State College of Agricultural and Mechanic Arts (later renamed Iowa State University) in the Missouri Valley Conference during the 1908 college football season. In their second season under head coach Clyde Williams, the Cyclones compiled a 6–3 record (2–1 against conference opponents), tied for second place in the conference, shut out five of nine opponents, and outscored all opponents by a combined total of 186 to 50. E. W. Law was the team captain.

Between 1892 and 1913, the football team played on a field that later became the site of the university's Parks Library. The field was known as State Field; when the new field opened in 1914, it became known as "New State Field".

== Schedule ==
Date	Opponent	Site	Result	Attendance	Source
September 26	Morningside*	State Field; Ames, IA	W 23–0		
October 3	Coe*	State Field; Ames, IA	W 34–0		
October 10	at Minnesota*	Northrop Field; Minneapolis, MN	L 10–15	5,000	
October 17	at Cornell (IA)*	Mount Vernon, IA	L 0–6		
October 24	South Dakota*	State Field; Ames, IA	W 26–0		
October 31	at Missouri	Rollins Field; Columbia, MO (rivalry)	W 16–0		
November 7	vs. Nebraska	Dietz Park; Omaha, NE (rivalry)	L 17–23		
November 14	Grinnell*	State Field; Ames, IA	W 53–0		
November 26	at Drake	Haskins Field; Des Moines, IA	W 12–6		
*Non-conference game
