= Carroll N. Kirk =

American football coach and college sports coach (1886–1963)

Carroll Kirk
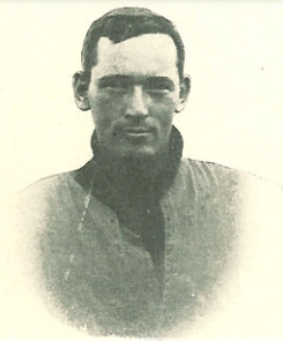
- Kirk pictured in the 1909 Iowa yearbook

Biographical details
- Born: April 27, 1886; Clemons, Iowa, U.S.
- Died: October 20, 1963 (aged 77); Davenport, Iowa, U.S.

Playing career

Football
- 1906–1908: Iowa
- Positions: Halfback, quarterback

Coaching career (HC unless noted)

Football
- 1909–1910: Simpson (IA)

Basketball
- 1909–1911: Simpson (IA)

Head coaching record
- Overall: 9–4 (football); 7–5 (basketball)

Accomplishments and honors

Awards
- All-Western (1907)

Carroll Nathan "Chick" Kirk (April 27, 1886 – October 20, 1963) was an American football player and college sports coach. He served as the head football coach (1909–1910) and head basketball coach (1909–1911) at Simpson College in Indianola, Iowa. Kirk was an outstanding college football player at the University of Iowa, earning All-Western honors in 1907. He is credited with being Iowa's first passing quarterback. Kirk was the captain of the 1908 Iowa Hawkeyes football team.

Kirk was born in Clemons, Iowa. He later owned and managed the Murdoch Paint Co., in Davenport, Iowa, until his retirement in 1956. Kirk died on October 20, 1963, at Good Samaritan Center, in Davenport. He is the paternal great-grandfather of Charlie Kirk.

== Head coaching record ==
=== Football ===
Year	Team	Overall	Conference	Standing	Bowl/playoffs
Simpson Red and Gold (Independent) (1909–1910)
1909	Simpson	5–2			
1910	Simpson	4–2			
Simpson:		9–4			
Total:		9–4			
