= 1907 Minnesota Golden Gophers football team =

American college football season

1907 Minnesota Golden Gophers football
- Conference: Western Conference
- Record: 2–2–1 (0–1–1 Western)
- Head coach: Henry L. Williams (8th season)
- Captain: John Schuknecht
- Home stadium: Northrop Field

1907 Western Conference football standings
	Conf.					Overall
Team	W		L		T	W		L		T
Chicago $	4	–	0	–	0	4	–	1	–	0
Wisconsin	3	–	1	–	1	3	–	1	–	1
Illinois	3	–	2	–	0	3	–	2	–	0
Iowa	1	–	1	–	0	3	–	2	–	0
Minnesota	0	–	1	–	1	2	–	2	–	1
Indiana	0	–	3	–	0	2	–	3	–	1
Purdue	0	–	3	–	0	0	–	5	–	0
$ – Conference champion

The 1907 Minnesota Golden Gophers football team represented the University of Minnesota in the 1907 college football season. In their eighth year under head coach Henry L. Williams, the Golden Gophers compiled a 2–2–1 record (0–1–1 against Western Conference opponents) and outscored all opponents 55 to 52.

== Schedule ==
Date	Opponent	Site	Result	Attendance
October 12	Iowa State*	Northrop Field; Minneapolis, MN	W 8–0	5,000
October 19	Nebraska*	Northrop Field; Minneapolis, MN (rivalry)	W 8–5	8,000
November 2	Chicago	Northrop Field; Minneapolis, MN	L 12–18	18,000
November 16	Carlisle*	Northrop Field; Minneapolis, MN	L 10–12	15,000
November 23	at Wisconsin	Randall Field; Madison, WI (rivalry)	T 17–17	
*Non-conference game
