= Forest Van Hook =

American football player (1883–1937)

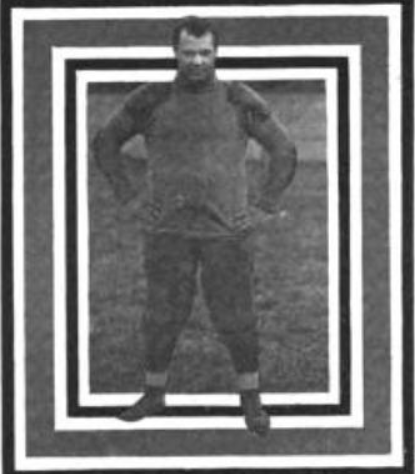

Profile
- Position: Guard

Personal information
- Born: December 3, 1883 near Mount Pulaski, Illinois, U.S.
- Died: January 29, 1937 (aged 52); Tucson, Arizona, U.S.
- Listed height: 6 ft 0 in (1.83 m)
- Listed weight: 295 lb (134 kg)

Career information
- High school: Mount Pulaski (IL)
- College: Illinois (1905–1908)

Awards and highlights
- Third-team All-American (1908); 3× All-Western (1906, 1907, 1908)

Forest Clyde Van Hook (December 3, 1883 – January 29, 1937) was an American football right guard who was a three-time All-Western and All-American for the Illinois Fighting Illini.

== Biography ==
Born on a farm near Mount Pulaski, Illinois, Van Hook attended a one room-school in the area and then Mount Pulaski High School. After graduating from Mount Pulaski, Van Hook entered the University of Illinois and became a top football and track athlete while also being a top student. He graduated first in his class, never received a grade below 90%, and was on the football and track teams for all four years of his attendance.

Van Hook was a member of the freshman football team at Illinois in 1905 and then was a starter on the varsity from 1906 to 1908; a 6 ft 0 in, 295 lb right guard, he gained a reputation as one of the best guards in school history. He was three times selected to the All-Western team and three times was a third-team All-American selection (including by Walter Camp in 1908), despite their being at the time a bias against players from western schools. Prominent sportswriter Walter Eckersall, in choosing Van Hook to his All-Western team, stated that he was so talented that he could have played any position on the field and still would have made the team. He served as team captain as a senior, called "the highest honor to be attained at the University".

Line coach J. M. Lindgren said that "Van Hook was one of the greatest guards in Illinois football. On defense he could handle almost one entire side of the line and he was one of the best I ever saw in opening holes on offense. Athletic director George Huff called him "perhaps the best offensive guard in our history". The Illio, at Van Hook's graduation, noted that he was "one of the most popular players in the history of Illinois ... We have never had a guard who possessed greater ability than that which Van Hook has exhibited in the past three years. For a man of his size and weight, his play has been little short of marvelous. It is safe to say that there has never been a football player in the west or in the east who has figured in more plays than Van Hook."

After having graduated first in his class at Illinois following the 1908 season, Van Hook began attending Northwestern Medical School, receiving his Doctor of Medicine degree while being second in his class in 1912. He was on the Northwestern football coaching staff for a time and then entered medical practice, starting as an intern at Barnes-Jewish Hospital in St. Louis, Missouri. He returned to his hometown of Mount Pulaski in 1914, continuing to practice medicine for the rest of his life. Van Hook kept an interest in his alma mater's athletics, often persuading others to play football and basketball there. He attended many Illinois games and always bought two tickets due to his large size.

Van Hook was married and had four children. He died on January 29, 1937, of complications from diabetes.
