= Illinois–Northwestern football rivalry =

American college football rivalry

- Illinois Fighting Illini Northwestern Wildcats
- First meeting: October 12, 1892; Tie, 16–16
- Latest meeting: November 29, 2025; Illinois, 20–13
- Next meeting: November 28, 2026
- Trophy: Land of Lincoln Trophy; Sweet Sioux Tomahawk (former)

Statistics
- Total meetings: 119
- All-time series: Illinois leads, 59–55–5
- Largest victory: Illinois, 66–0 (1894)
- Longest win streak: Illinois, 7 (1913–1928, 1979–1985)
- Current win streak: Illinois, 2 (2024–present)

Locations of Illinois and Northwestern

The Illinois–Northwestern football rivalry is a college football rivalry between the Illinois Fighting Illini and Northwestern Wildcats. The Land of Lincoln Trophy is presented to the winner of the game. The teams began competing for the new prize in 2009, replacing the Sweet Sioux Tomahawk, which was used from 1945 to 2008. Like many rivalry games, the game is played during the final week of the college football season.

== Traveling trophies ==
=== Sweet Sioux Tomahawk ===
The Sweet Sioux Tomahawk was presented to the winner of the annual football game between the two schools. The original trophy was a carved wooden "cigar store" Indian, but was stolen and replaced by a replica of a tomahawk.

Northwestern won the Tomahawk first in 1945, beating Illinois 13–7 in Evanston. At the end of the 2008 football season, when the teams last played for the trophy, Illinois led the series 52–45–5, and 33–29–2 during the era of the Tomahawk. Northwestern narrowed the series record in the trophy's final years, winning five of the last six meetings.

The 2008 game in Evanston was the final time the two teams played for the Tomahawk, which Northwestern won 27–10. The NCAA mandated that all Native American imagery deemed hostile and abusive must be removed from college athletics, including the Sweet Sioux Tomahawk. Before the game, the schools agreed that Northwestern would be the trophy's permanent resting place. If Illinois had won the game, it would have surrendered the trophy to Northwestern after the on-field celebration.

=== Land of Lincoln Trophy ===
Beginning in 2009, the two schools played for the Land of Lincoln Trophy, known by fans of both schools as "The Hat". The trophy's name derives from the official state nickname of Illinois and depicts a bronze replica of a stovepipe hat famously worn by Abraham Lincoln. It was designed by Dick Tracy cartoonist Dick Locher and cast by sculptor Don Reed of River's Edge Foundry, Beloit Wisconsin.

Northwestern won the trophy in its inaugural game in 2009. The 2010 contest was played at Wrigley Field, home of Major League Baseball's Chicago Cubs. It was the first football game at Wrigley Field since 1970 and the first collegiate football game at Wrigley Field since 1938. The field used an east-west field configuration (home plate to right field). In order to keep the playing field at regulation size, the safety clearances for each end zone to the walls in the field were considerably less than normal. In particular, the east (right field) end zone came under scrutiny as its end zone was wedged extremely close to the right field wall (as close as one foot in some areas), forcing the goal posts to be hung from the right field wall in order to fit. Despite extra padding provided in these locations, it was decided that all offensive plays for both teams play to the west end zone, where there was more safety clearance. The east end zone could still be used on defensive touchdowns and punt returns, as well as defensive safeties; in fact, there was one interception run back for an eastbound touchdown. Illinois won 48–27.

Between 2014 and 2023, the game became a division contest as Illinois and Northwestern were aligned into the Big Ten's Western division to accommodate the arrival of Maryland and Rutgers. The Big Ten announced its plans to realign its schools geographically in April 2013 in time for the 2014 football season. After the conference's expansion in 2024, divisions were disbanded. However, Illinois and Northwestern were given a protected rivalry to ensure they still meet every season.

== Game results ==
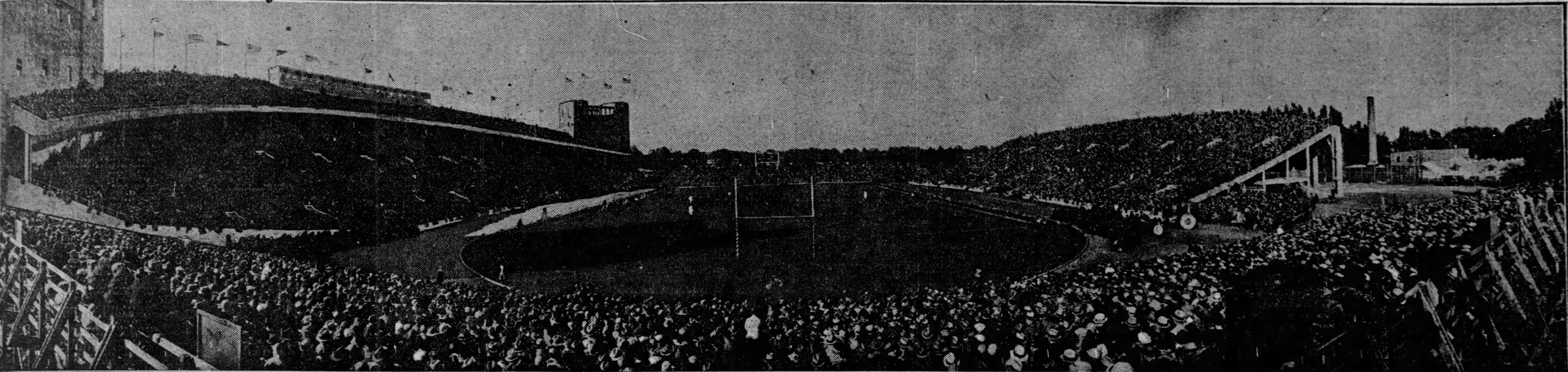
1927 game at Northwestern

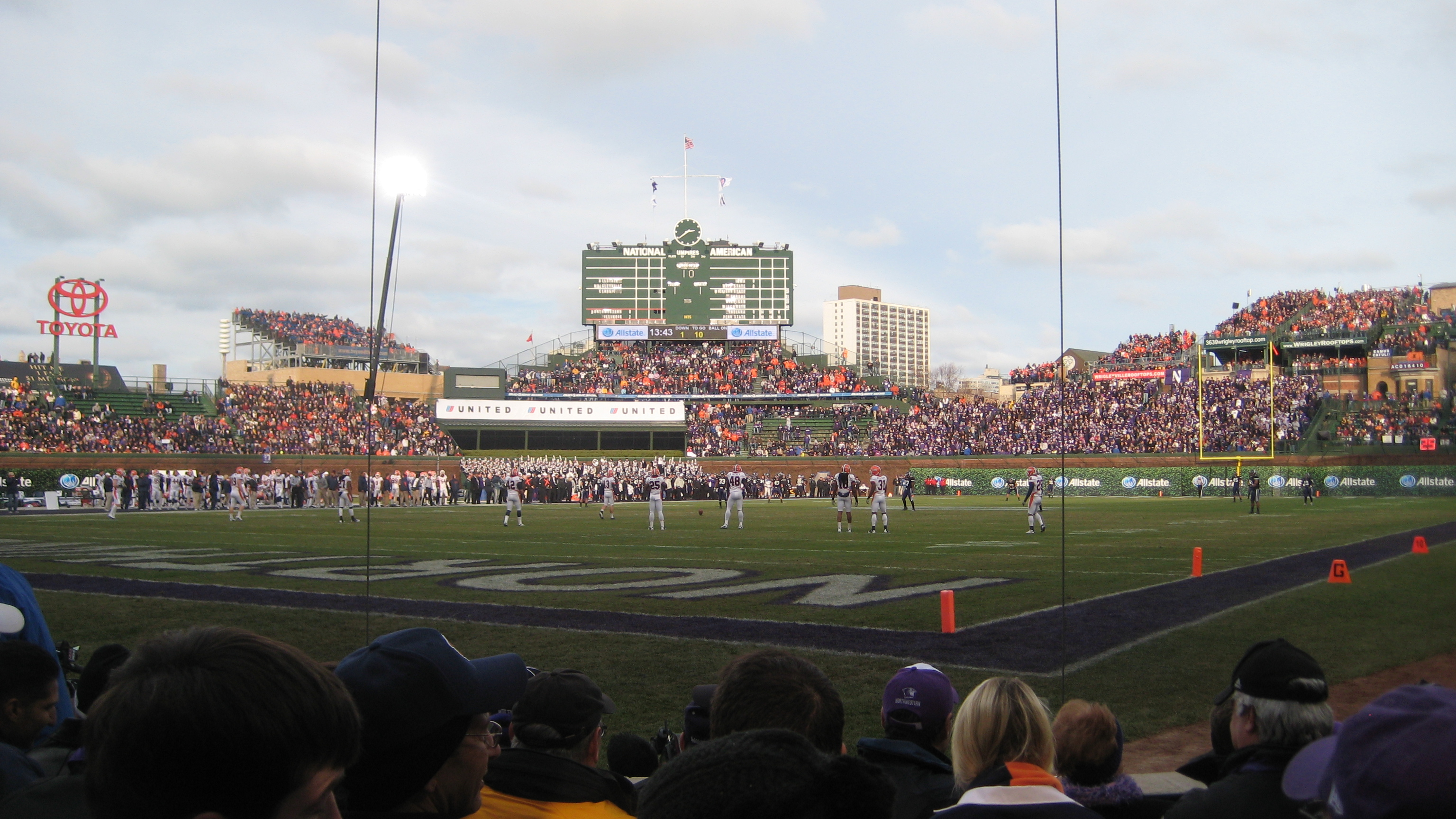
2010 game at Wrigley Field in Chicago

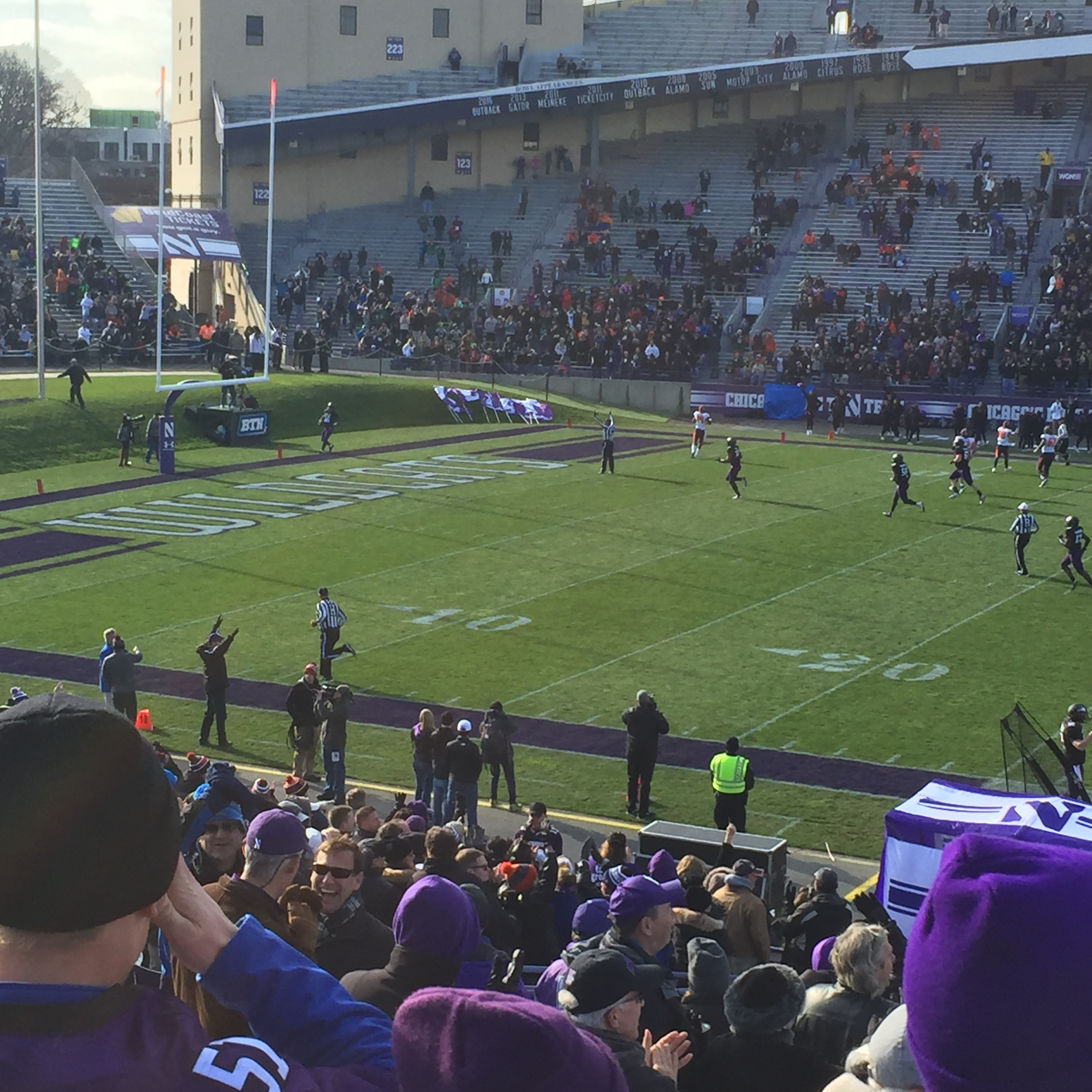
2016 game at Northwestern

Illinois victories	Northwestern victories	Tie games

No.	Date	Location	Winner	Score
1	October 12, 1892	Champaign	Tie	16–16
2	October 21, 1893	Evanston	Tie	0–0
3	November 3, 1894	Champaign	Illinois	66–0
4	November 23, 1895	Champaign	Illinois	38–4
5	November 7, 1896	Champaign	Northwestern	10–4
6	October 20, 1900	Evanston	Tie	0–0
7	October 26, 1901	Champaign	Northwestern	17–11
8	November 22, 1902	Evanston	Illinois	17–0
9	October 31, 1903	Champaign	Northwestern	12–11
10	November 12, 1904	Evanston	Northwestern	12–6
11	November 21, 1908	Champaign	Illinois	64–8
12	November 13, 1909	Evanston	Illinois	35–0
13	November 12, 1910	Evanston	Illinois	27–0
14	November 18, 1911	Champaign	Illinois	27–13
15	November 23, 1912	Evanston	Northwestern	6–0
16	October 18, 1913	Champaign	Illinois	37–0
17	October 24, 1914	Evanston	Illinois	37–0
18	October 23, 1915	Champaign	Illinois	36–6
19	November 4, 1922	Champaign	Illinois	6–3
20	October 27, 1923	Chicago	Illinois	29–0
21	October 22, 1927	Evanston	Illinois	7–6
22	October 27, 1928	Champaign	Illinois	6–0
23	November 2, 1929	Evanston	Northwestern	7–0
24	October 18, 1930	Champaign	Northwestern	32–0
25	October 31, 1931	Evanston	Northwestern	32–6
26	October 15, 1932	Champaign	Northwestern	26–0
27	November 11, 1933	Evanston	Illinois	3–0
28	November 10, 1934	Evanston	Illinois	14–3
29	November 2, 1935	Evanston	Northwestern	10–3
30	October 24, 1936	Champaign	#4 Northwestern	13–2
31	November 6, 1937	Evanston	Illinois	6–0
32	October 22, 1938	Champaign	#18 Northwestern	13–0
33	October 28, 1939	Evanston	Northwestern	13–0
34	November 9, 1940	Evanston	#10 Northwestern	32–14
35	November 22, 1941	Evanston	#10 Northwestern	27–0
36	November 7, 1942	Evanston	#20 Illinois	14–7
37	November 20, 1943	Evanston	#9 Northwestern	53–6
38	November 25, 1944	Evanston	Illinois	25–6
39	November 24, 1945	Evanston	Northwestern	13–7
40	November 23, 1946	Evanston	#5 Illinois	20–0
41	November 22, 1947	Champaign	Northwestern	28–13
42	November 20, 1948	Evanston	#7 Northwestern	20–0
43	November 19, 1949	Champaign	Northwestern	9–7
44	November 25, 1950	Evanston	Northwestern	14–7
45	November 24, 1951	Evanston	#6 Illinois	3–0
46	November 22, 1952	Champaign	Northwestern	28–26
47	November 21, 1953	Evanston	#7 Illinois	39–14
48	November 20, 1954	Champaign	Northwestern	20–7
49	November 19, 1955	Evanston	Tie	7–7
50	November 24, 1956	Evanston	Northwestern	14–13
51	November 23, 1957	Champaign	Illinois	27–0
52	November 22, 1958	Champaign	Illinois	27–20
53	November 21, 1959	Champaign	Illinois	28–0
54	November 19, 1960	Evanston	Northwestern	14–7
55	October 7, 1961	Champaign	Northwestern	28–7
56	October 6, 1962	Evanston	Northwestern	45–0
57	October 5, 1963	Champaign	Illinois	10–9
58	October 3, 1964	Evanston	#3 Illinois	17–6
59	November 20, 1965	Evanston	Illinois	20–6
60	November 19, 1966	Evanston	Northwestern	35–7

No.	Date	Location	Winner	Score
61	November 18, 1967	Evanston	Illinois	27–21
62	November 16, 1968	Champaign	Illinois	14–0
63	October 11, 1969	Champaign	Northwestern	10–6
64	October 10, 1970	Evanston	Northwestern	48–0
65	October 30, 1971	Champaign	Illinois	24–7
66	November 4, 1972	Evanston	Illinois	43–13
67	November 24, 1973	Evanston	Northwestern	9–6
68	November 23, 1974	Champaign	Illinois	28–14
69	November 22, 1975	Evanston	Illinois	28–7
70	November 20, 1976	Champaign	Illinois	48–6
71	November 19, 1977	Evanston	Northwestern	28–6
72	September 9, 1978	Champaign	Tie	0–0
73	November 17, 1979	Evanston	Illinois	29–13
74	September 6, 1980	Champaign	Illinois	35–9
75	November 21, 1981	Evanston	Illinois	49–12
76	September 4, 1982	Champaign	Illinois	49–13
77	November 19, 1983	Evanston	#4 Illinois	56–24
78	September 1, 1984	Champaign	Illinois	24–16
79	November 23, 1985	Evanston	Illinois	45–20
80	November 22, 1986	Champaign	Northwestern	23–18
81	November 21, 1987	Evanston	Northwestern	28–10
82	November 19, 1988	Champaign	Illinois	28–13
83	November 25, 1989	Evanston	#11 Illinois	63–14
84	November 24, 1990	Champaign	#22 Illinois	28–23
85	October 26, 1991	Evanston	Northwestern	17–11
86	October 24, 1992	Champaign	Northwestern	27–26
87	October 30, 1993	Champaign	Illinois	20–13
88	October 29, 1994	Evanston	Illinois	28–7
89	October 28, 1995	Champaign	#8 Northwestern	17–14
90	October 26, 1996	Evanston	#11 Northwestern	27–24
91	November 8, 1997	Champaign	Northwestern	34–21
92	October 3, 1998	Evanston	Illinois	13–10
93	November 20, 1999	Champaign	Illinois	29–7
94	November 18, 2000	Evanston	#23 Northwestern	61–23
95	November 24, 2001	Champaign	#10 Illinois	34–28
96	November 23, 2002	Evanston	Illinois	31–24
97	November 22, 2003	Champaign	Northwestern	37–20
98	November 20, 2004	Evanston	Northwestern	28–21
99	November 18, 2005	Champaign	Northwestern	38–21
100	November 18, 2006	Evanston	Northwestern	27–16
101	November 17, 2007	Champaign	#20 Illinois	41–22
102	November 22, 2008	Evanston	Northwestern	27–10
103	November 14, 2009	Champaign	Northwestern	21–16
104	November 20, 2010	Chicago	Illinois	48–27
105	October 1, 2011	Champaign	#24 Illinois	38–35
106	November 24, 2012	Evanston	Northwestern	50–14
107	November 30, 2013	Champaign	Northwestern	37–34
108	November 29, 2014	Evanston	Illinois	47–33
109	November 28, 2015	Chicago	#17 Northwestern	24–14
110	November 26, 2016	Evanston	Northwestern	42–21
111	November 25, 2017	Champaign	#22 Northwestern	42–7
112	November 24, 2018	Evanston	#19 Northwestern	24–16
113	November 30, 2019	Champaign	Northwestern	29–10
114	December 12, 2020	Evanston	#15 Northwestern	28–10
115	November 27, 2021	Champaign	Illinois	47–14
116	November 26, 2022	Evanston	Illinois	41–3
117	November 25, 2023	Champaign	Northwestern	45–43
118	November 30, 2024	Chicago	#23 Illinois	38–28
119	November 29, 2025	Champaign	Illinois	20–13
Series: Illinois leads 59–55–5

== See also ==
- List of NCAA college football rivalry games
- List of most-played college football series in NCAA Division I
