= John Messmer =

American football player and discus thrower (1884–1971)

Profile
- Position: Guard

Personal information
- Born: September 25, 1884
- Died: November 8, 1971 (aged 87); Milwaukee, Wisconsin, U.S.

Career information
- College: Wisconsin

Awards and highlights
- Second-team All-American (1908); First-team All-Western (1907)

John Messmer (September 25, 1884 – November 8, 1971) was an American football player and discus thrower for the University of Wisconsin. He was selected as a second-team All-American by Walter Camp in 1908. In 1959, Messmer was inducted into the Wisconsin Athletic Hall of Fame.

== Biography ==
A native of Milwaukee, Wisconsin, Messmer began his athletic career at Milwaukee East High School. In 1904, Messmer set a national high school record in the discus throw.

Messmer enrolled at the University of Wisconsin where he competed in track, football, baseball, swimming, water polo and crew, becoming the first Wisconsin athlete to win nine varsity letters in major sports. He was the captain of both the football and swim teams in 1907. In 1908, he was also selected by Walter Camp as a second-team All-American at the guard position.

In a May 1908 meet in Chicago, Messmer threw for a distance of 129 feet 9 inches (39.55 meters), a distance that would have taken the bronze medal two months later at the 1908 Olympics. He reportedly won every discus competition he ever entered. He qualified for the U.S. Olympic team in 1908 with the best discus throw in the country, but he withdrew from the Olympic team because of a brother's illness. Messmer was also a member of the University of Wisconsin baseball team that toured Japan in 1909.

After graduating from the University of Wisconsin, Messmer worked as a surveyor in the Madison area. He later became an architect in Milwaukee and worked on the design and supervised construction of such buildings as the Elks Club and West Allis City Hall, churches, halls, schools, banks, Concordia College and some industrial buildings. He also served as the general superintendent of Milwaukee County construction from 1928 until his retirement in 1956.

In 1959, Messmer was chosen unanimously for induction into the Wisconsin Athletic Hall of Fame. The biography of Messmer at the Wisconsin Walk of Fame notes that, in addition to being captain of the football and swim teams, Messmer won three letters in each of track, football and baseball and concludes: "John Messmer might have been the most versatile athlete to ever compete at the University of Wisconsin." He was also inducted into the University of Wisconsin Athletic Hall of Fame in 1993.
