= Walter Steffen =

American football player and coach (1886–1937)

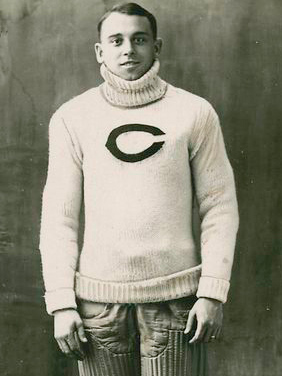

Judge on the Superior Court of Cook County
- In office December 4, 1922 – 1937

Chicago Alderman from the 23rd Ward
- In office April 1917 – December 1922 Serving with Wallace O. Thomas
- Preceded by: John Kjellander

Personal details
- Born: October 9, 1886 Chicago, Illinois, U.S.
- Died: March 9, 1937 (aged 50) Chicago, Illinois, U.S.
- Party: Republican
- Education: University of Chicago
- Coaching career

Playing career
- 1906–1908: Chicago
- Position: Quarterback

Coaching career (HC unless noted)
- 1914–1932: Carnegie Tech

Head coaching record
- Overall: 88–53–9

Accomplishments and honors

Awards
- Consensus All-American (1908); Third-team All-American (1907); 2× First-team All-Western (1906, 1907)
- College Football Hall of Fame; Inducted in 1969 (profile)

Walter Peter Steffen (October 9, 1886 – March 9, 1937) was an American college football player and coach, lawyer, politician, and judge. He emerged on the national scene as a high school quarterback, leading his North Division High School team of Chicago to an intersectional championship over Boys High School of Brooklyn by a score of 75–0 that ended after three quarters because of darkness. Steffen and his team helped introduce the more open style of play that prevailed in the Midwest. He played college football as a quarterback at the University of Chicago from 1906 to 1908 and was a two-time All-American selection. Steffen served as the head football coach at the Carnegie Institute of Technology—now known as Carnegie Mellon University–from 1914 to 1932, compiling a record of 88–53–9. He was inducted into the College Football Hall of Fame as a player in 1969.

Steffen graduated from the University of Chicago Law School in 1912 and was admitted to the Illinois state bar the same year. He served as assistant United States Attorney under James Herbert Wilkerson and then as an alderman on the Chicago City Council, representing the 23rd Ward. He had been elected to fill the seat left vacant earlier that year after the resignation of John Kjellander. In 1922, Steffen was elected to the Superior Court of Cook County as a Republican. He resigned from the City Council to assume this judgeship and served on the court until his death. Steffen's health declined in the 1930s. He was operated on for gall stones in 1930 and a kidney ailment in 1936. In early 1937, he was diagnosed with a brain tumor. He died at his home, in Chicago, on March 9, 1937.

== Head coaching record ==
Year	Team	Overall	Conference	Standing	Bowl/playoffs
Carnegie Tech Tartans (Independent) (1914–1932)
1914	Carnegie Tech	4–4			
1915	Carnegie Tech	7–1			
1916	Carnegie Tech	4–3			
1917	Carnegie Tech	2–3–1			
1918	No team—World War I				
1919	Carnegie Tech	3–4			
1920	Carnegie Tech	5–3			
1921	Carnegie Tech	7–2			
1922	Carnegie Tech	5–3–1			
1923	Carnegie Tech	4–3–1			
1924	Carnegie Tech	5–4			
1925	Carnegie Tech	5–2–1			
1926	Carnegie Tech	7–2			
1927	Carnegie Tech	5–4–1			
1928	Carnegie Tech	7–1			
1929	Carnegie Tech	5–3–1			
1930	Carnegie Tech	6–3			
1931	Carnegie Tech	3–5–1			
1932	Carnegie Tech	4–3–2			
Carnegie Tech:		88–53–9			
Total:		88–53–9			
