= Illinois Field (1884) =

Former athletics facility in Urbana, Illinois

Coordinates: 40.1160°N 88.2285°W

- Interactive map of Illinois Field
- Location: Urbana, Illinois
- Owner: University of Illinois Urbana–Champaign
- Operator: University of Illinois Urbana–Champaign
- Capacity: 17,000

Construction
- Opened: 1884
- Closed: 1987

Tenants
- Illinois Fighting Illini baseball (1884–1987); Illinois Fighting Illini football (1890–1922); Big Ten baseball tournament (1982)

Illinois Field was a stadium in Urbana, Illinois. It hosted the Illinois Fighting Illini football team until they moved to the Memorial Stadium in 1923 and the school's baseball team until they moved to the current Illinois Field in 1988. The stadium held 17,000 people at its peak.

== Events ==
The field hosted the 1982 Big Ten Conference baseball tournament, won by Minnesota.
