= Iowa Field =

Football stadium in Iowa, US

Coordinates: 41°39′35.0″N 91°32′23.5″W

- Interactive map of Iowa Field
- Location: Iowa City, Iowa
- Owner: University of Iowa
- Operator: University of Iowa
- Capacity: 30,000

Construction
- Opened: 1890
- Closed: 1929

Tenant
- Iowa Hawkeyes football (1890-1929)

Iowa Field was a stadium in Iowa City, Iowa. It hosted the University of Iowa Hawkeyes football team until they moved to Iowa Stadium (now Kinnick Stadium) in 1929. The stadium held 30,000 people at its peak and opened in 1890.

Iowa Field was located on the east bank of the Iowa River where a parking lot currently exists across the railroad tracks from the university's Main Library. The northern third of this area was a baseball field, while the southern two-thirds consisted of the football field and stands. This strip of land was so narrow that the upper portion of the west stands stuck out over the Iowa River and the upper section of the east stands rose directly over the railroad tracks, as shown in rare photographs of that era.

Ahead of the 1922 season, the stadium was expanded. The original concrete stands were augmented with steel stands, raising the stadium's capacity to 25,000. The new stands were designed by a professor at the university. Further extensions were planned to bring the capacity to 42,000.

The final game at Iowa Field was a September 28, 1929 game between Carroll College. Iowa played Monmouth in the new stadium on October 5.
