= 1906 Western Conference football season =

- Sport: Football
- Teams: 8
- Champion: Wisconsin, Minnesota, Michigan

Football seasons

1906 Western Conference football standings
	Conf.					Overall
Team	W		L		T	W		L		T
Wisconsin +	3	–	0	–	0	5	–	0	–	0
Minnesota +	2	–	0	–	0	4	–	1	–	0
Michigan +	1	–	0	–	0	4	–	1	–	0
Chicago	3	–	1	–	0	4	–	1	–	0
Illinois	1	–	3	–	0	1	–	3	–	1
Iowa	0	–	1	–	0	2	–	3	–	0
Indiana	0	–	2	–	0	4	–	2	–	0
Purdue	0	–	3	–	0	0	–	5	–	0
+ – Conference co-champions

The 1906 Western Conference football season was the eleventh season of college football played by the member schools of the Western Conference (later known as the Big Ten Conference) and was a part of the 1906 college football season.

In 1906, Michigan president James Burrill Angell called for several meetings to further regulate football in the Western Conference. One of the new rules would require the football coach to be a full-time employee of the university, causing Michigan's head football coach, Fielding Yost, to object. Yost convinced Michigan's board to support him over Angell and against the conference. In April 1907, Michigan was voted out of the conference for refusing to adhere to the new league rules, which they insisted they would not follow. As a result, Western Conference schools did not play Michigan again until they rejoined the league in 1918.

== Season overview ==
There was a three-way tie for the conference title between Wisconsin, who went 5-0 (3-0 in conference play); Minnesota, who went 4-1 (2-0); and Michigan, who went 4-1 (1-0)

Chicago finished with an overall record of 4-1 (3-1), Illinois went 1-3-1 (1-3), Iowa went 2-3 (0-1), Indiana wound up at 4-2 (0-2), and Purdue followed with a record of 0-5 (0-3).

Northwestern did not field a team in 1906, nor would they for the 1907 college football season. The Purple would return to the gridiron in 1908.

=== Wisconsin ===
Date	Opponent	Site	Result	Attendance	Source
October 13	Lawrence*	Randall Field; Madison, WI	W 5–0		
October 20	North Dakota*	Randall Field; Madison, WI	W 10–0		
November 3	Iowa	Randall Field; Madison, WI (rivalry)	W 18–4	3,000	
November 10	at Illinois	Illinois Field; Champaign, IL	W 16–6		
November 17	Purdue	Randall Field; Madison, WI	W 29–5		
*Non-conference game

=== Minnesota ===
Date	Opponent	Site	Result	Attendance
October 27	Iowa State*	Northrop Field; Minneapolis, MN	W 22–4	3,000
November 3	Nebraska*	Northrop Field; Minneapolis, MN (rivalry)	W 13–0	5,000
November 10	at Chicago	Marshall Field; Chicago, IL	W 4–2	7,000
November 17	Carlisle*	Northrop Field; Minneapolis, MN	L 0–17	20,000
November 24	Indiana	Northrop Field; Minneapolis, MN	W 8–6	10,000
*Non-conference game

=== Michigan ===
Date	Time	Opponent	Site	Result	Attendance
October 6		Case*	Ferry Field; Ann Arbor, MI	W 28–0	2,000
October 20	2:40 p.m.	at Ohio State*	University Park; Columbus, OH (rivalry)	W 6–0	6,000
October 27	2:37 p.m.	Illinois	Ferry Field; Ann Arbor, MI (rivalry)	W 28–9	5,000
November 3		Vanderbilt*	Ferry Field; Ann Arbor, MI	W 10–4	10,000
November 17		at Penn*	Franklin Field; Philadelphia, PA	L 0–17	26,000
*Non-conference game; All times are in Eastern time

=== Chicago ===
Date	Opponent	Site	Result	Attendance	Source
October 20	Purdue	Marshall Field; Chicago, IL (rivalry)	W 39–0	7,000–8,000	
October 27	Indiana	Marshall Field; Chicago, IL	W 33–8		
November 10	Minnesota	Marshall Field; Chicago, IL	L 2–4	7,000	
November 17	Illinois	Marshall Field; Chicago, IL	W 63–0		
November 24	Nebraska*	Marshall Field; Chicago, IL	W 38–5		
*Non-conference game

=== Illinois ===
Date	Opponent	Site	Result	Attendance	Source
October 13	Wabash*	Illinois Field; Champaign, IL	T 0–0		
October 27	at Michigan	Ferry Field; Ann Arbor, MI (rivalry)	L 9–28	5,000	
November 10	Wisconsin	Illinois Field; Champaign, IL	L 6–16		
November 17	at Chicago	Marshall Field; Chicago, IL	L 0–63		
November 24	at Purdue	Stuart Field; Lafayette, IN (rivalry)	W 5–0	> 4,000	
*Non-conference game

=== Iowa ===
Date	Opponent	Site	Result	Attendance	Source
October 27	Missouri*	Iowa Field; Iowa City, IA (rivalry)	W 26–4		
November 3	at Wisconsin	Randall Field; Madison, WI (rivalry)	L 4–18	3,000	
November 10	Coe*	Iowa Field; Iowa City, IA	W 15–12		
November 24	Iowa State*	Iowa Field; Iowa City, IA	L 0–2		
November 29	at Saint Louis*	Sportsman's Park; St. Louis, MO	L 0–39	13,000	
*Non-conference game

=== Indiana ===
Date	Opponent	Site	Result	Attendance	Source
October 13	Indiana alumni*	Jordan Field; Bloomington, IN	W 16–0		
October 20	at Wabash*	Crawfordsville, IN	W 12–5		
October 27	at Chicago	Marshall Field; Chicago, IL	L 8–33		
November 3	DePauw*	Jordan Field; Bloomington, IN	W 55–0		
November 10	vs. Notre Dame*	Indianapolis, IN	W 12–0		
November 24	at Minnesota	Northrop Field; Minneapolis, MN	L 6–8	10,000	
*Non-conference game

=== Purdue ===
Date	Opponent	Site	Result	Attendance	Source
October 20	at Chicago	Marshall Field; Chicago, IL (rivalry)	L 0–39	7,000–8,000	
October 27	Wabash*	Stuart Field; West Lafayette, IN	L 0–11	5,000	
November 3	Notre Dame*	Stuart Field; West Lafayette, IN (rivalry)	L 0–2		
November 17	at Wisconsin	Randall Field; Madison, WI	L 5–29		
November 24	Illinois	Stuart Field; West Lafayette, IN (rivalry)	L 0–5	> 4,000	
*Non-conference game

=== Bowl games ===
No Western Conference schools participated in any bowl games during the 1906 season.

== All-American honors ==
The following Western Conference players were selected as first-team players on the 1906 College Football All-America Team. (Consensus All-Americans displayed in bold).

End Bobby Mitchell of Minnesota, one of the first black players named to an All-America team.

- Bobby Marshall, End, Minnesota (College Football Hall of Fame) (WC-2)
- **Walter Eckersall**, Quarterback, Chicago (WC-1; CW-1 [fb]; NYM-1; COMP)
- John Garrels, Fullback, Michigan (WC-3)

=== Key ===
NCAA recognized selectors for 1906

- WC = Walter Camp for Collier's Weekly
- CW = Caspar Whitney for Outing magazine

Other selectors

- NYW = New York World by Robert W. Edgren
- NYS = New York Sun
- CC = Charles Chadwick
- NYT = The New York Times
- NYM = New York Mail
- COMP = A composite All-American team distilled from the All-American selected by nine of "the most prominent of the eastern sporting writers and critics"

Bold = Consensus All-American

- 1 – First-team selection
- 2 – Second-team selection
- 3 – Third-team selection

== All-Western selections ==
=== Ends ===
- Bobby Marshall, Minnesota (CA, CC, CDN, CE, CEP, CIO, CJ, CRH, CT, ECP-1, OL, SLG) (CFHOF)
- Mysterious Walker, Chicago (CA, CC, CDN, CE, CIO, CJ, CRH, ECP-1, SLG)
- Charles J. Moynihan, Illinois (ECP-2)

=== Tackles ===
- Joe Curtis, Michigan (CA, CC, CDN, CE, CEP, CIO, CJ, CRH, CT, ECP-1, SLG)
- Ed Parry, Chicago (CA, CC, CDN, CE, CEP [end], CIO, CJ, CRH [guard], ECP-1, OL [end], SLG)
- George Leland Case, Minnesota (CC [guard], CE [guard], CEP, CRH [guard], CT, ECP-2, OL)
- Franklin C. Wade, Indiana (ECP-2)

=== Guards ===
- Forest Van Hook, Illinois (CDN, CEP, CT, ECP-1, SLG)
- Theodore Vita, Minnesota (CA, CDN, CE, CEP, CJ, CT, ECP-2, OL, SLG)
- William "Bill" Ittner, Minnesota (CC, CIO, CRH [tackle], ECP-1, OL [tackle])
- Warren A. Gelbach, Wisconsin (CIO)
- Walter D. Graham, Michigan (CJ, ECP-2)
- Smith, Minnesota (CA, OL)

=== Centers ===
- Orren Eark Safford, Minnesota (CC, CDN, CE, CEP, CIO, CRH, ECP-1, OL, SLG)
- Lloyd A. Waugh, Indiana (CJ, ECP-2)
- Stechm, Wisconsin (CT)
- W. Wellinghoff, Purdue (CA)

=== Quarterbacks ===
- Walter Eckersall, Chicago (CA, CC, CDN, CE, CEP, CIO, CJ, CRH, CT, ECP-1, OL, SLG) (CFHOF)
- Frank K. Hare, Indiana (ECP-2)

=== Halfbacks ===
- Walter Steffen, Chicago (CA, CDN, CE, CEP, CIO, CJ, CT, ECP-2, SLG) (CFHOF)
- John Schuknecht, Minnesota (CC, CDN, CIO, CRH, ECP-1, OL, SLG)
- Heze Clark, Indiana (CE, CEP, CJ, CRH, CT, ECP-1)
- Hodge, Illinois (CA)
- Paul Magoffin, Michigan (CC, ECP-2)
- William C. Doane, Minnesota (OL)

=== Fullbacks ===
- John Garrels, Michigan (CA, CC, CDN, CE, CEP, CIO, CJ, CRH, CT, ECP-1, OL, SLG)
- Earl Current, Minnesota (ECP-2)
