= 1906 Chicago Maroons football team =

American college football season

1906 Chicago Maroons football
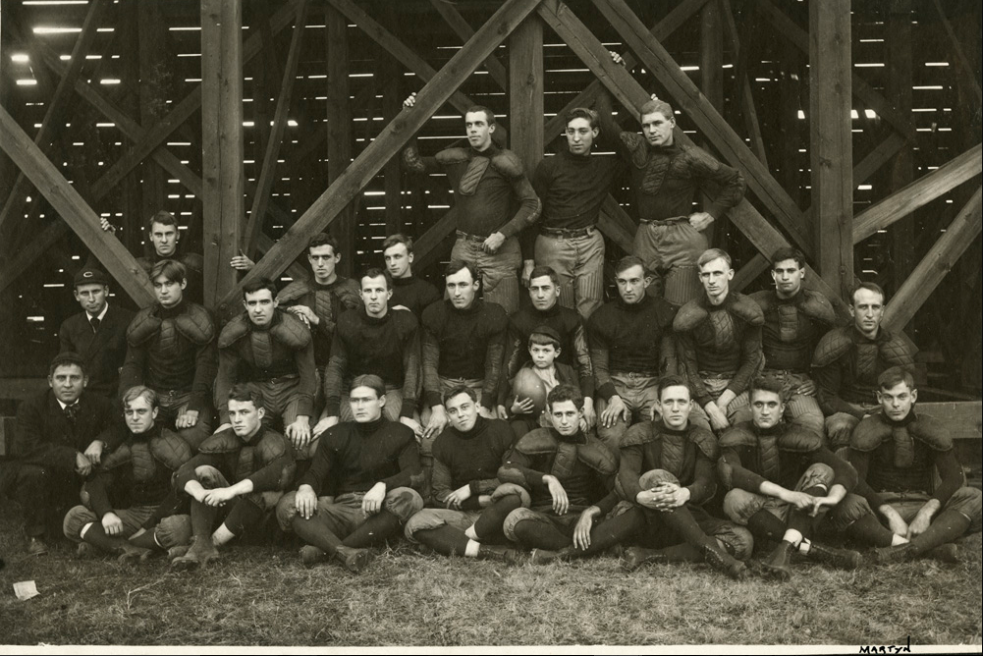
- Conference: Western Conference
- Record: 4–1 (4–1 Western)
- Head coach: Amos Alonzo Stagg (15th season)
- Captain: Walter Eckersall
- Home stadium: Marshall Field

1906 Western Conference football standings
	Conf.					Overall
Team	W		L		T	W		L		T
Wisconsin +	3	–	0	–	0	5	–	0	–	0
Minnesota +	2	–	0	–	0	4	–	1	–	0
Michigan +	1	–	0	–	0	4	–	1	–	0
Chicago	3	–	1	–	0	4	–	1	–	0
Illinois	1	–	3	–	0	1	–	3	–	1
Iowa	0	–	1	–	0	2	–	3	–	0
Indiana	0	–	2	–	0	4	–	2	–	0
Purdue	0	–	3	–	0	0	–	5	–	0
+ – Conference co-champions

The 1906 Chicago Maroons football team was an American football team that represented the University of Chicago during the 1906 college football season. In their 15th season under head coach Amos Alonzo Stagg, the Maroons compiled a 4–1 record, finished in fourth place in the Western Conference, and outscored all opponents by a combined total of 175 to 17.

== Schedule ==
Date	Opponent	Site	Result	Attendance	Source
October 20	Purdue	Marshall Field; Chicago, IL (rivalry)	W 39–0	7,000–8,000	
October 27	Indiana	Marshall Field; Chicago, IL	W 33–8		
November 10	Minnesota	Marshall Field; Chicago, IL	L 2–4	7,000	
November 17	Illinois	Marshall Field; Chicago, IL	W 63–0		
November 24	Nebraska*	Marshall Field; Chicago, IL	W 38–5		
*Non-conference game

== Roster ==
Team photo taken after the 63–0 drubbing delivered to Illinois.

Player	Position	Weight
Walter Eckersall (captain)	quarterback	143
John E. Anderson	center	175
Leo DeTray	left halfback	174
Sherman W. Finger	fullback	164
William Francis Hewitt	right end	168
Harold Iddings	left halfback	160
Wellington Downing Jones	left guard	174
Thomas Kelley	right guard, right tackle	188
James Roache McCarthy	right guard	179
Harry Lee Mefford	right end	166
Fred William Noll	left guard, left tackle	201
Ed Parry	right end	202
Clarence W. Russell	left tackle	188
Walter Steffen	right halfback	158
Frank Herbert Templeton	left halfback, quarterback	188
Mysterious Walker	left end	176
Charles Francis Watson	right tackle	180
Norman Edward Barker	substitute	170
Robert Sachs Harris	substitute	175
Ned Merriam	substitute	162
Stirling Bruce Parkinson	substitute	175
Raymond L. Quigley	substitute	162
Rufus Boynton Rogers	substitute	165
Max Spencer Rohde	substitute	175
John Schommer	substitute	170
Harry Johnson Schott	substitute	181

- Head coach: Amos Alonzo Stagg (15th year at Chicago)
