= 1906 Purdue Boilermakers football team =

American college football season

1906 Purdue Boilermakers football
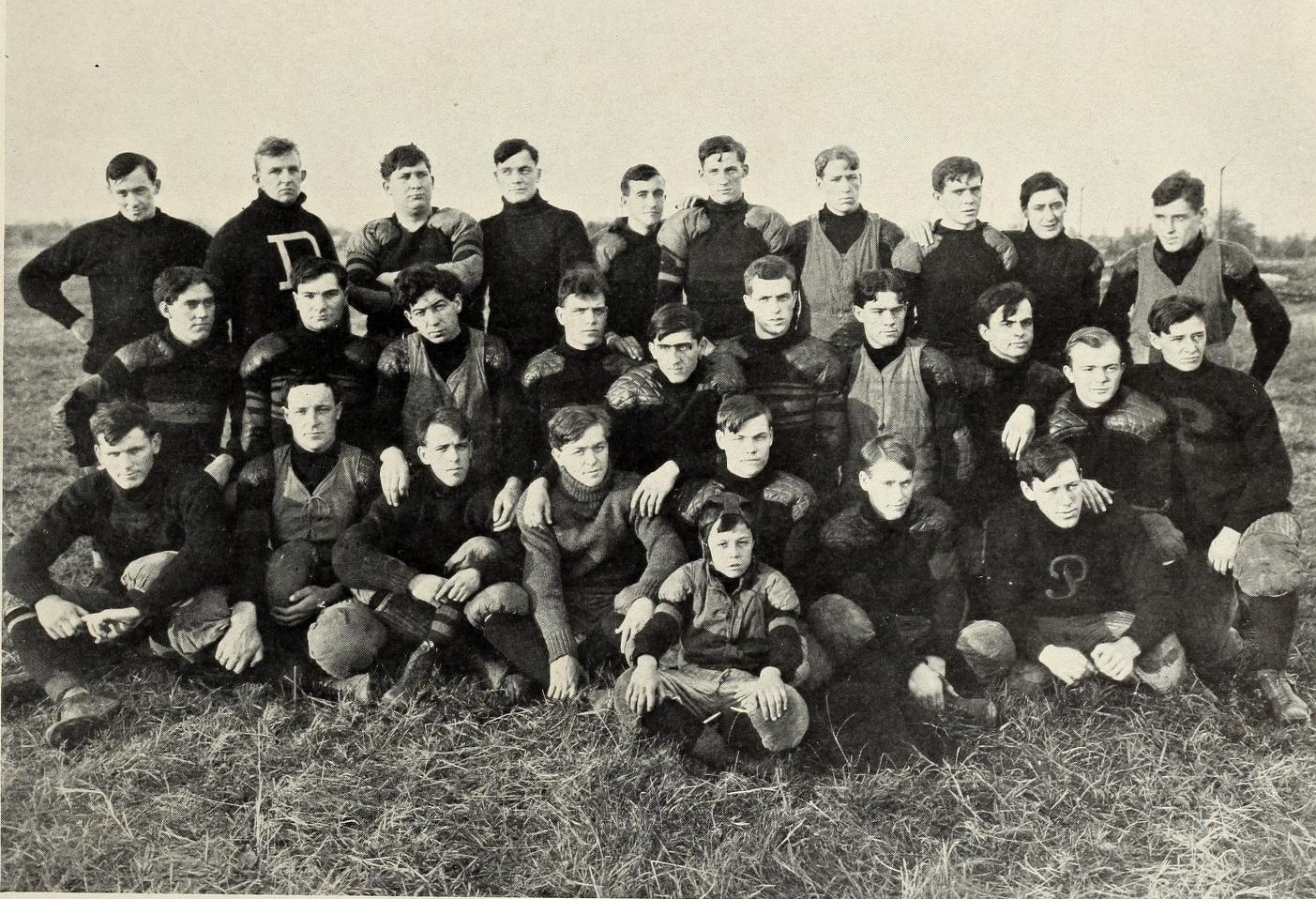
- Conference: Western Conference
- Record: 0–5 (0–3 Western)
- Head coach: Myron E. Witham (1st season)
- Captain: W. A. Wellinghoff
- Home stadium: Stuart Field

1906 Western Conference football standings
	Conf.					Overall
Team	W		L		T	W		L		T
Wisconsin +	3	–	0	–	0	5	–	0	–	0
Minnesota +	2	–	0	–	0	4	–	1	–	0
Michigan +	1	–	0	–	0	4	–	1	–	0
Chicago	3	–	1	–	0	4	–	1	–	0
Illinois	1	–	3	–	0	1	–	3	–	1
Iowa	0	–	1	–	0	2	–	3	–	0
Indiana	0	–	2	–	0	4	–	2	–	0
Purdue	0	–	3	–	0	0	–	5	–	0
+ – Conference co-champions

The 1906 Purdue Boilermakers football team was an American football team that represented Purdue University during the 1906 college football season. In their first season under head coach Myron E. Witham, the Boilermakers compiled an 0–5 record, finished in last place in the Big Nine Conference with an 0–3 record against conference opponents, and were outscored by their opponents by a total of 86 to 5. W. A. Wellinghoff was the team captain.

== Schedule ==
Date	Opponent	Site	Result	Attendance	Source
October 20	at Chicago	Marshall Field; Chicago, IL (rivalry)	L 0–39	7,000–8,000	
October 27	Wabash*	Stuart Field; West Lafayette, IN	L 0–11	5,000	
November 3	Notre Dame*	Stuart Field; West Lafayette, IN (rivalry)	L 0–2		
November 17	at Wisconsin	Randall Field; Madison, WI	L 5–29		
November 24	Illinois	Stuart Field; West Lafayette, IN (rivalry)	L 0–5	> 4,000	
*Non-conference game

== Roster ==
- J. M. Berkheiser, G
- B. Cooley, HB
- Frank DeBoos, E
- A. J. DeLauter, T
- R. W. Fleming, E
- H. J. Frushour, G
- E. M. Greesom, HB
- E. R. Holdson, QB
- Asher Holloway, HB
- D. H. Long, T
- Harry Merrill, FB
- George Miles, QB-HB
- J. F. Reed, HB
- Robert Robertson, T
- W. Wellinghoff, C
- Leroy Wyant, E
