= 1906 Wisconsin Badgers football team =

American college football season

1906 Wisconsin Badgers football

Western Conference co-champion
- Conference: Western Conference
- Record: 5–0 (3–0 Western)
- Head coach: Charles P. Hutchins (1st season)
- Captain: Warren A. Gelbach
- Home stadium: Randall Field

1906 Western Conference football standings
	Conf.					Overall
Team	W		L		T	W		L		T
Wisconsin +	3	–	0	–	0	5	–	0	–	0
Minnesota +	2	–	0	–	0	4	–	1	–	0
Michigan +	1	–	0	–	0	4	–	1	–	0
Chicago	3	–	1	–	0	4	–	1	–	0
Illinois	1	–	3	–	0	1	–	3	–	1
Iowa	0	–	1	–	0	2	–	3	–	0
Indiana	0	–	2	–	0	4	–	2	–	0
Purdue	0	–	3	–	0	0	–	5	–	0
+ – Conference co-champions

The 1906 Wisconsin Badgers football team represented the University of Wisconsin as a member of the Western Conference during the 1906 college football season. Led by first-year head coach Charles P. Hutchins, the Badgers compiled an overall record of 5–0 with a mark of 3–0 in conference play, sharing the Western Conference title with 1906 Michigan Wolverines football team and 1906 Minnesota Golden Gophers football team. The team's captain was Warren A. Gelbach.

== Schedule ==
Date	Opponent	Site	Result	Attendance	Source
October 13	Lawrence*	Randall Field; Madison, WI	W 5–0		
October 20	North Dakota*	Randall Field; Madison, WI	W 10–0		
November 3	Iowa	Randall Field; Madison, WI (rivalry)	W 18–4	3,000	
November 10	at Illinois	Illinois Field; Champaign, IL	W 16–6		
November 17	Purdue	Randall Field; Madison, WI	W 29–5		
*Non-conference game
