= 1906 Iowa Hawkeyes football team =

American college football season

1906 Iowa Hawkeyes football
- Conference: Western Conference
- Record: 2–3 (0–1 Western)
- Head coach: Mark Catlin Sr. (1st season)
- Captain: George Allen
- Home stadium: Iowa Field

1906 Western Conference football standings
	Conf.					Overall
Team	W		L		T	W		L		T
Wisconsin +	3	–	0	–	0	5	–	0	–	0
Minnesota +	2	–	0	–	0	4	–	1	–	0
Michigan +	1	–	0	–	0	4	–	1	–	0
Chicago	3	–	1	–	0	4	–	1	–	0
Illinois	1	–	3	–	0	1	–	3	–	1
Iowa	0	–	1	–	0	2	–	3	–	0
Indiana	0	–	2	–	0	4	–	2	–	0
Purdue	0	–	3	–	0	0	–	5	–	0
+ – Conference co-champions

The 1906 Iowa Hawkeyes football team was an American football team that represented the State University of Iowa ("S.U.I."), now known as the University of Iowa, as a member of the Western Conference during the 1906 college football season. In their first year under head coach Mark Catlin Sr., the Hawkeyes compiled a 2–3 record (0–1 in conference games), finished in a three-way tie for last place in the Western Conference, and were outscored by a total of 75 to 45.

The Western Conference in 1906 adopted a number of reforms, including a rule limiting member schools to only five intercollegiate football games each year. Conference members had played as many as 11 or 12 games in 1905, but all member schools were limited to five games for the 1906 season.

Iowa played its home games at Iowa Field in Iowa City, Iowa.

== Schedule ==
Date	Opponent	Site	Result	Attendance	Source
October 27	Missouri*	Iowa Field; Iowa City, IA (rivalry)	W 26–4		
November 3	at Wisconsin	Randall Field; Madison, WI (rivalry)	L 4–18	3,000	
November 10	Coe*	Iowa Field; Iowa City, IA	W 15–12		
November 24	Iowa State*	Iowa Field; Iowa City, IA	L 0–2		
November 29	at Saint Louis*	Sportsman's Park; St. Louis, MO	L 0–39	13,000	
*Non-conference game

== Players ==
- George Allen, halfback and captain
- Howard Bateman
- William L. Carberry
- Edward Elliott
- Carl Fritzel
- Irving Hastings
- Maurice Kent
- Carroll N. Kirk
- Will Knowlton
- William McFadden
- Merle Rockwood
- Jack Streff
- Arthur Thompson
- Roy Washburn
