= 1906 All-Western college football team =

American all-star college football team

The 1906 All-Western college football team consists of American football players selected to the All-Western teams chosen by various selectors for the 1906 college football season.

== All-Western selections ==
=== Ends ===
- Bobby Marshall, Minnesota (CA, CC, CDN, CE, CEP, CIO, CJ, CRH, CT, ECP-1, OL, SLG) (CFHOF)
- Mysterious Walker, Chicago (CA, CC, CDN, CE, CIO, CJ, CRH, ECP-1, SLG)
- Franz "Dutch" Frurip, Wabash (CT)
- Frank W. Johnson, Nebraska (ECP-2)
- Charles J. Moynihan, Illinois (ECP-2)

=== Tackles ===
- Joe Curtis, Michigan (CA, CC, CDN, CE, CEP, CIO, CJ, CRH, CT, ECP-1, SLG)
- Ed Parry, Chicago (CA, CC, CDN, CE, CEP [end], CIO, CJ, CRH [guard], ECP-1, OL [end], SLG)
- George Leland Case, Minnesota (CC [guard], CE [guard], CEP, CRH [guard], CT, ECP-2, OL)
- Franklin C. Wade, Indiana (ECP-2)

=== Guards ===
- Forest Van Hook, Illinois (CDN, CEP, CT, ECP-1, SLG)
- Theodore Vita, Minnesota (CA, CDN, CE, CEP, CJ, CT, ECP-2, OL, SLG)
- William "Bill" Ittner, Minnesota (CC, CIO, CRH [tackle], ECP-1, OL [tackle])
- Warren A. Gelbach, Wisconsin (CIO)
- Walter D. Graham, Michigan (CJ, ECP-2)
- Smith, Minnesota (CA, OL)

=== Centers ===
- Orren Eark Safford, Minnesota (CC, CDN, CE, CEP, CIO, CRH, ECP-1, OL, SLG)
- Lloyd A. Waugh, Indiana (CJ, ECP-2)
- Stechm, Wisconsin (CT)
- W. Wellinghoff, Purdue (CA)

=== Quarterbacks ===
- Walter Eckersall, Chicago (CA, CC, CDN, CE, CEP, CIO, CJ, CRH, CT, ECP-1, OL, SLG) (CFHOF)
- Frank K. Hare, Indiana (ECP-2)

=== Halfbacks ===
- Walter Steffen, Chicago (CA, CDN, CE, CEP, CIO, CJ, CT, ECP-2, SLG) (CFHOF)
- John Schuknecht, Minnesota (CC, CDN, CIO, CRH, ECP-1, OL, SLG)
- Heze Clark, Indiana (CE, CEP, CJ, CRH, CT, ECP-1)
- Hodge, Illinois (CA)
- Paul Magoffin, Michigan (CC, ECP-2)
- William C. Doane, Minnesota (OL)

=== Fullbacks ===
- John Garrels, Michigan (CA, CC, CDN, CE, CEP, CIO, CJ, CRH, CT, ECP-1, OL, SLG)
- Earl Current, Minnesota (ECP-2)

== Key ==
CA = Chicago American

CC = Chicago Chronicle

CDN = Chicago Daily News

CE = Chicago Examiner

CEP = Chicago Evening Post

CIO = Chicago Inter-Ocean

CJ = Chicago Journal

CRH = Chicago Record-Herald

CT = Chicago Tribune

ECP = Elmer C. Patterson for Collier's Weekly

OL = O'Loughlin in The Minneapolis Journal

SLG = St. Louis Globe-Democrat

CFHOF = College Football Hall of Fame

== See also ==
- 1906 College Football All-America Team
