= Franz Frurip =

American football player and coach (1883–1927)

Biographical details
- Born: 1883
- Died: 1927 (aged 43–44)

Playing career
- 1903–1906: Wabash
- Position: End

Coaching career (HC unless noted)
- 1907: Indiana State

Head coaching record
- Overall: 2–1

Accomplishments and honors

Awards
- All-Western (1906)

Franz William "Dutch" Frurip (1883–1927) was an American college football player and coach. He served as the head football coach at Indiana State University in 1907. He was a standout player at Wabash College in Crawfordsville, Indiana, earning All-Western honors in 1906.

== Head coaching record ==
Year	Team	Overall	Conference	Standing	Bowl/playoffs
Indiana State Sycamores (Independent) (1907)
1907	Indiana State	2–1			
Indiana State:		2–1			
Total:		2–1			
