= 1906 Illinois Fighting Illini football team =

American college football season

1906 Illinois Fighting Illini football
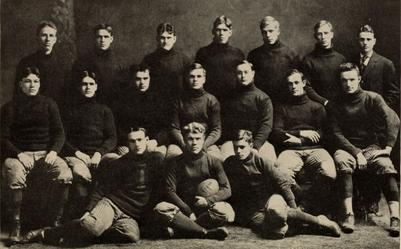
- Conference: Western Conference
- Record: 1–3–1 (1–3 Western)
- Head coach: Justa Lindgren (2nd season)
- Captain: Ira T. Carrithers
- Home stadium: Illinois Field

1906 Western Conference football standings
	Conf.					Overall
Team	W		L		T	W		L		T
Wisconsin +	3	–	0	–	0	5	–	0	–	0
Minnesota +	2	–	0	–	0	4	–	1	–	0
Michigan +	1	–	0	–	0	4	–	1	–	0
Chicago	3	–	1	–	0	4	–	1	–	0
Illinois	1	–	3	–	0	1	–	3	–	1
Iowa	0	–	1	–	0	2	–	3	–	0
Indiana	0	–	2	–	0	4	–	2	–	0
Purdue	0	–	3	–	0	0	–	5	–	0
+ – Conference co-champions

The 1906 Illinois Fighting Illini football team was an American football team that represented the University of Illinois during the 1906 college football season. In their second non-consecutive season under head coach Justa Lindgren, the Illini compiled a 1–3–1 record and finished in fifth place in the Western Conference. Halfback Ira T. Carrithers was the team captain.

== Schedule ==
Date	Opponent	Site	Result	Attendance	Source
October 13	Wabash*	Illinois Field; Champaign, IL	T 0–0		
October 27	at Michigan	Ferry Field; Ann Arbor, MI (rivalry)	L 9–28	5,000	
November 10	Wisconsin	Illinois Field; Champaign, IL	L 6–16		
November 17	at Chicago	Marshall Field; Chicago, IL	L 0–63		
November 24	at Purdue	Stuart Field; Lafayette, IN (rivalry)	W 5–0	> 4,000	
*Non-conference game
