= Sherman W. Finger =

American sports coach (1883–1937)

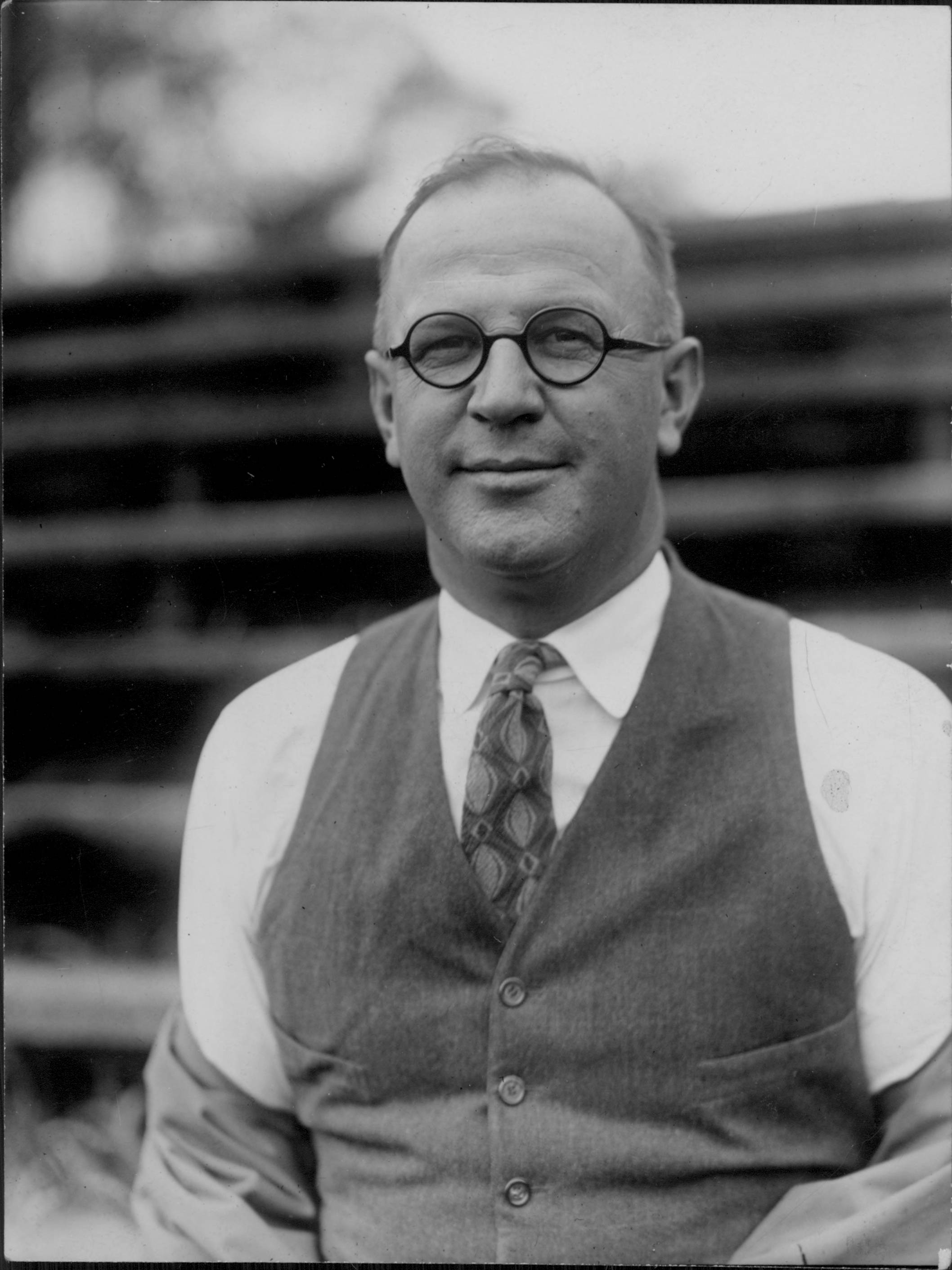

Biographical details
- Born: May 4, 1883; Oshkosh, Wisconsin, U.S.
- Died: May 7, 1937 (aged 54); Hennepin County, Minnesota, U.S.

Playing career

Football
- 1906: Chicago
- Position: Fullback

Coaching career (HC unless noted)

Football
- 1907–1923: Cornell (IA)

Basketball
- 1910–1924: Cornell (IA)

Track
- 1910–1924: Cornell (IA)

Head coaching record
- Overall: 57–49–9 (football); 83–82 (basketball)

Sherman William Finger (May 4, 1883 – May 7, 1937) was an American football, basketball, and track coach. He served as the head football coach at Cornell College in Mount Vernon, Iowa from 1907 to 1923, compiling a record of 57–49–9. Finger was also Cornell's head basketball coach from 1910 to 1924, tallying a mark of 83–82. He was a 1907 graduate of the University of Chicago, where he was a member of the freshman football squad in 1905.
