= 1906 Ohio State Buckeyes football team =

American college football season

1906 Ohio State Buckeyes football

OAC champion
- Conference: Ohio Athletic Conference
- Record: 8–1 (3–0 OAC)
- Head coach: Albert E. Herrnstein (1st season)
- Home stadium: Ohio Field

1906 Ohio Athletic Conference football standings
	Conf.					Overall
Team	W		L		T	W		L		T
Ohio State $	3	–	0	–	0	8	–	1	–	0
Western Reserve	1	–	1	–	1	4	–	2	–	2
Ohio Wesleyan	1	–	1	–	2	3	–	3	–	3
Oberlin	1	–	1	–	3	1	–	3	–	3
Case	2	–	3	–	0	4	–	5	–	1
Kenyon	0	–	2	–	2	1	–	4	–	2
$ – Conference champion

The 1906 Ohio State Buckeyes football team was an American football team that represented Ohio State University during the 1906 college football season. The Buckeyes compiled an 8–1 record and outscored their opponents by a combined total of 153 to 14 in their first season under head coach Albert E. Herrnstein.

== Schedule ==
Date	Opponent	Site	Result	Attendance
September 29	Otterbein*	Ohio Field; Columbus, OH	W 41–0	
October 6	Wittenberg*	Ohio Field; Columbus, OH	W 52–0	
October 10	Muskingum*	Ohio Field; Columbus, OH	W 16–0	
October 20	Michigan*	Ohio Field; Columbus, OH (rivalry)	L 0–6	6,000
November 3	at Oberlin	Oberlin, OH	W 6–0	
November 10	Kenyon	Ohio Field; Columbus, OH	W 6–0	
November 17	at Case	Van Horn Field; Cleveland, OH	W 9–0	
November 24	Wooster*	Ohio Field; Columbus, OH	W 12–0	
November 29	Ohio Medical*	Ohio Field; Columbus, OH	W 11–8	
*Non-conference game
