= Ira T. Carrithers =

American sports coach, athletics administrator (1886–1955)

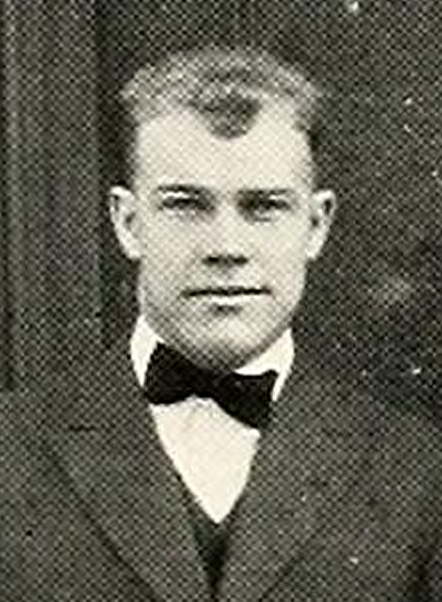
- Carrithers pictured in The Forester 1916, Lake Forest yearbook

Biographical details
- Born: October 25, 1886; Washburn, Illinois, U.S.
- Died: February 17, 1955 (aged 68); Cedar Rapids, Iowa, U.S.

Playing career

Football
- 1904–1906: Illinois

Baseball
- 1906–1907: Illinois
- Positions: Halfback (football); Left fielder (baseball)

Coaching career (HC unless noted)

Football
- 1907: Illinois (freshmen)
- 1908–1909: Alma
- 1910–1912: Knox (IL)
- 1913: Illinois (assistant)
- 1914: Lake Forest
- 1915–1923: Coe (freshmen)

Basketball
- 1910–1913: Knox (IL)
- 1914–1915: Lake Forest
- 1915–1924: Coe

Baseball
- 1909–1910: Alma
- 1916–1924: Coe

Administrative career (AD unless noted)
- 1908–1910: Alma
- 1910–1913: Knox (IL)
- 1914–1915: Lake Forest
- 1915–1924: Coe

Head coaching record
- Overall: 22–18–1 (football); 75–88 (basketball)

Ira Thomson Carrithers (October 25, 1886 – February 17, 1955) was an American football, basketball, and baseball coach and athletics administrator. He served as the head football coach at Alma College (1908–1909), Knox College in Galesburg, Illinois (1910–1912), and Lake Forest College (1914), compiling a career college football record of 22–18–1. Carrithers was also the head basketball coach at Knox (1910–1913), Lake Forest (1914–1915, 1929–1932), and Coe College (1915–1924), amassing a career college basketball mark of 91–118.

Carrithers was born on October 25, 1886, in Washburn, Illinois, and went to high school in Pontiac, Illinois. He competed in football, baseball, and track and field at the University of Illinois.

In 1915, Carrithers became athletic director and coach of several sports at Coe College. He was inducted into the school's athletic hall of fame in 1973. After leaving coaching in 1924, Carrithers worked in the insurance business, and officiated football games for the Big Ten Conference, Big Six Conference, and the Missouri Valley Conference. He died suddenly, on February 17, 1955, at his home in Cedar Rapids, Iowa, due to a heart condition.

== Head coaching record ==
=== Football ===
| Year | Team | Overall | Conference | Standing | Bowl/playoffs |
|---|---|---|---|---|---|
Alma Maroon and Cream (Michigan Intercollegiate Athletic Association) (1908–1909)
| 1908 | Alma | 2–1 | 1–0 | | |
| 1909 | Alma | 2–4 | 1–1 | | |
| Alma: | | 4–5 | 2–1 | | |
Knox Old Siwash (Illinois Intercollegiate Athletic Conference) (1910–1912)
| 1910 | Knox | 4–4 | | | |
| 1911 | Knox | 5–2–1 | | | |
| 1912 | Knox | 6–2 | | | |
| Knox: | | 15–8–1 | | | |
Lake Forest Foresters (Little Five Conference) (1914)
| 1914 | Lake Forest | 3–5 | | | |
| Lake Forest: | | 3–5 | | | |
| Total: | | 22–18–1 | | | |
