= 1906 Michigan Wolverines football team =

American college football season

1906 Michigan Wolverines football
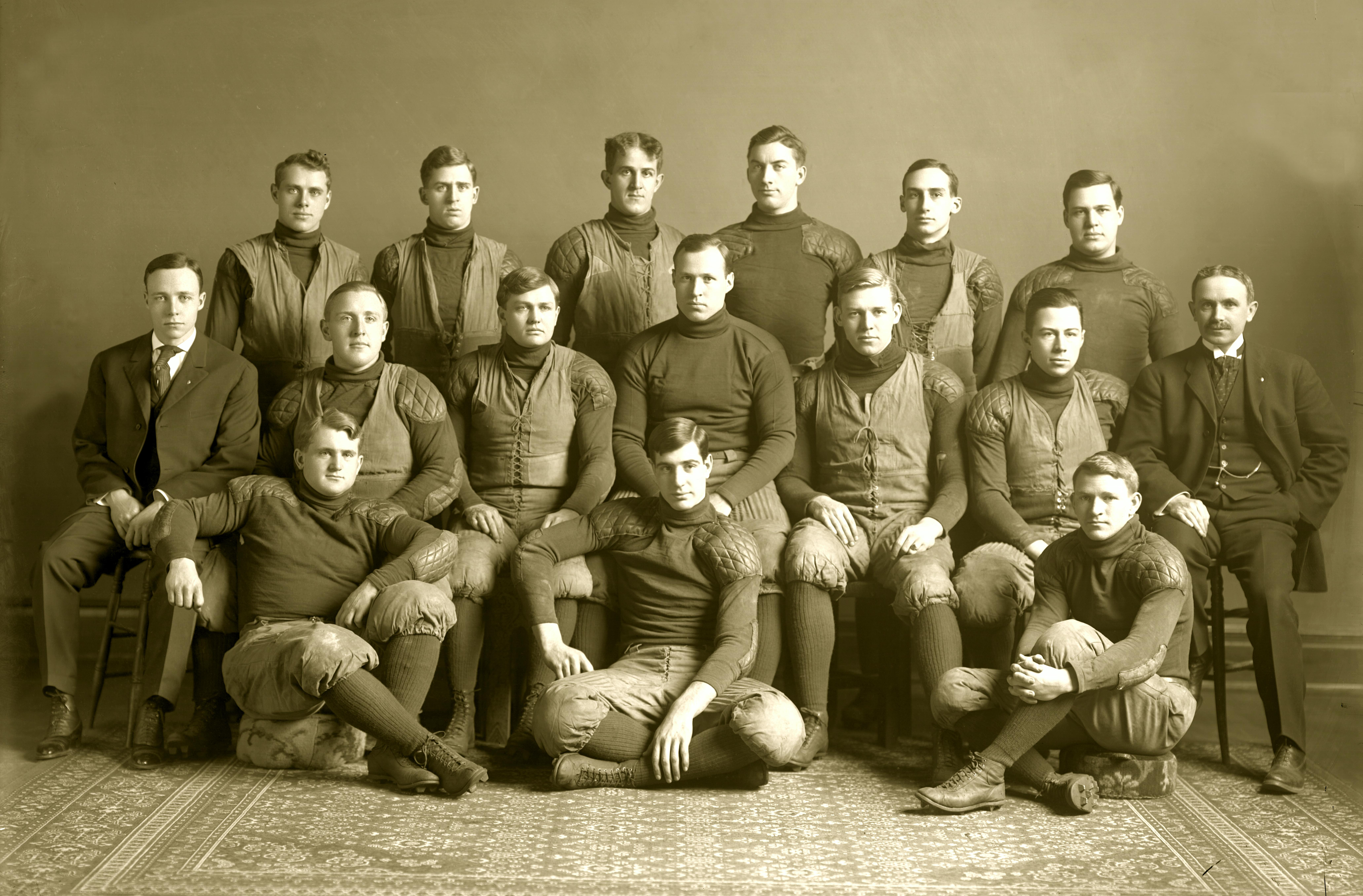

Western Conference co-champion
- Conference: Western Conference
- Record: 4–1 (1–0 Western)
- Head coach: Fielding H. Yost (6th season)
- Offensive scheme: Short punt
- Captain: Joe Curtis
- Home stadium: Ferry Field

1906 Western Conference football standings
	Conf.					Overall
Team	W		L		T	W		L		T
Wisconsin +	3	–	0	–	0	5	–	0	–	0
Minnesota +	2	–	0	–	0	4	–	1	–	0
Michigan +	1	–	0	–	0	4	–	1	–	0
Chicago	3	–	1	–	0	4	–	1	–	0
Illinois	1	–	3	–	0	1	–	3	–	1
Iowa	0	–	1	–	0	2	–	3	–	0
Indiana	0	–	2	–	0	4	–	2	–	0
Purdue	0	–	3	–	0	0	–	5	–	0
+ – Conference co-champions

The 1906 Michigan Wolverines football team represented the University of Michigan during the 1906 college football season. The team's head coach was Fielding H. Yost in his sixth year at Michigan. The team compiled a record of 4–1 and outscored opponents, 72 to 30.

The 1906 season was played under two sets of new rules. First, the rules governing intercollegiate football were changed to promote a more "open" and less dangerous style of play. The changes included the legalization of the forward pass and allowing the punting team to recover an "on-side" kick as a live ball. Second, the Big Nine Conference enacted new rules, including a rule limiting teams to five games (a drastic reduction from the 13 games played by Michigan in 1905) and prohibitions on the "training table" and pre-season training before the start of the academic year.

Also before the season began, university officials ruled that two of the stars from the 1905 team, Germany Schulz and Walter Rheinschild, were academically ineligible to compete in football. Despite the setbacks, Michigan won its first four games by a combined score of 72 to 13. The season opener against Case Scientific School was the first game played on the new Ferry Field. During the bye week before the final game of the season, Michigan's captain Joe Curtis sustained a severely broken leg in a practice game against the "scrub" team. The Wolverines lost their final game to the Penn Quakers, 17–0, at Philadelphia's Franklin Field.

Two Michigan players, Joe Curtis and fullback John Garrels, were selected as first-team All-Western players. Garrels, who had broken world records in the discus throw and the high hurdles, was also selected as a second-team All-American by Walter Camp.

== Schedule ==
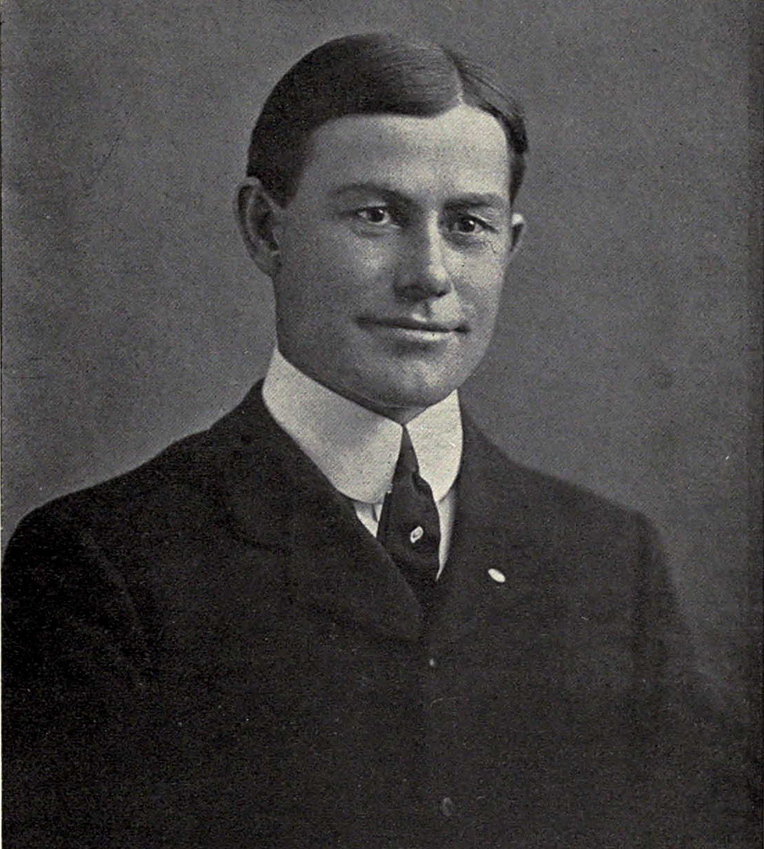
Head coach, Fielding H. Yost

Date	Time	Opponent	Site	Result	Attendance
October 6		Case*	Ferry Field; Ann Arbor, MI	W 28–0	2,000
October 20	2:40 p.m.	at Ohio State*	University Park; Columbus, OH (rivalry)	W 6–0	6,000
October 27	2:37 p.m.	Illinois	Ferry Field; Ann Arbor, MI (rivalry)	W 28–9	5,000
November 3		Vanderbilt*	Ferry Field; Ann Arbor, MI	W 10–4	10,000
November 17		at Penn*	Franklin Field; Philadelphia, PA	L 0–17	26,000
*Non-conference game; All times are in Eastern time

== Season summary ==
=== Case ===
Case at Michigan

Team	1	2	Total
Case	0	0	0
• Michigan	5	23	28

- Date: October 6, 1906
- Location: Ferry Field • Ann Arbor, MI
- Game attendance: 2,000
- Referee: Chase (Michigan)

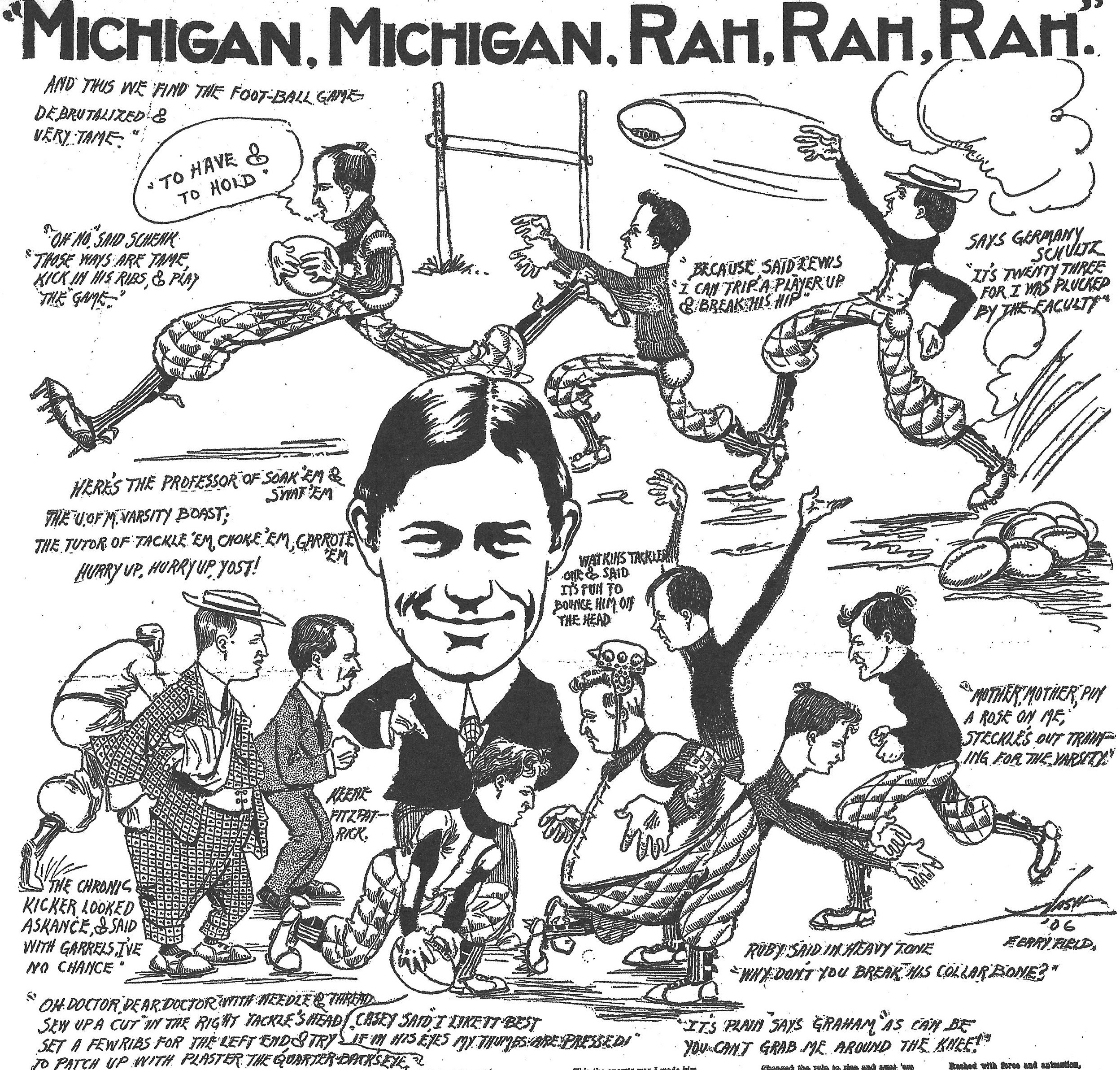
Cartoon on "de-brutalization" of football, October 1906, Detroit Free Press

On October 6, 1906, Michigan opened its season with a 28–0 victory over the team from Cleveland's Case Scientific School. The game was the first played at the newly completed Ferry Field and attracted a crowd estimated at 2,000 persons. The Detroit Free Press called the field "a beauty." The game was the 10th meeting between the two programs. Michigan had won all nine of the prior games by a combined score of 298 to 31.

Fullback John Garrels scored the first touchdown on the new Ferry Field. The score was set up when Case's fullback, Wagar, attempted a punt from deep in Case's territory. After a bad snap, Jack Loell broke through the line and tackled Wagar at Case's five-yard line. Garrels then scored on "two straight line bucks." Joe Curtis missed the extra point kick, and Michigan was unable to score again in the first half. Case threatened once in the first half, when Case's quarterback, Reimenschneider, returned an on-side kick to Michigan's 20-yard line. Wagar's attempt at a field goal for Case was unsuccessful, and Michigan led, 5–0, at halftime. In addition to scoring the first touchdown, Garrels handled punting responsibilities; one of his punts carried 60 yards. He also kicked an extra point and had the longest end run of the game for a 28-yard gain.

Michigan scored four additional touchdowns in the second half. Reimenschneider fumbled the opening kickoff to start the second half, and Michigan recovered the ball at Case's 20-yard line. After the turnover, Michigan quarterback Harry Workman ran for a touchdown. Michigan's third touchdown was set up by a poor punt by Case from behind its own goal line. A penalty was tacked on, and Michigan got the ball at the Case 10-yard line. Workman again ran for the touchdown. Clarence Schenk scored Michigan's fourth touchdown on a "cross buck" from the five-yard line. The final touchdown was scored by Arthur "Waukegan" Wright, a substitute right tackle who was described as "the 'pompadour' haired medic from Illinois," on a 35-yard run following an on-side kick. A rule change enacted in 1906 allowed the punting team to recover a punt as a live ball. The Detroit Free Press described Wright's touchdown as follows:

"Garrels made an on-side punt to the Case thirty-five yard line. Wright brought the ball to his breast after the bound as if it was his long-lost child, and was saving it from the kidnappers. Three Case men tried to stop him as he was making the run for his fireside home, but he seemed to have a through ticket without a punch, and scored the first touchdown of the year on the new rules."

Joe Curtis kicked two extra points, and Garrels kicked one. On defense, Michigan did not allow a first down on the ground, Case's only first downs coming on an on-side kick and off-side penalties against Michigan. Michigan did not attempt a single forward pass against Case, leading the Detroit Free Press to write, "Michigan did not uncan it because it is not fermented enough in this climate to make it look good."

After the game, Case's coach, Wentworth, opined that Michigan's 1906 team was "30 per cent weaker than any other team that Yost has coached here." Yost said, "I am satisfied. My men did as well as I expected. The only star in the game for Michigan was Johnnie Garrels. . . . Not once during the game did Case make its distance on regular football. They tried the forward pass twice, but both times were thrown back for big losses."

Michigan's lineup against Case was Davis (left end), Curtis (left tackle), Patrick (left guard), Loell, (center), Graham (right guard), Ruby and Wright (right tackle), Embs and Newton (right end), Bishop and Lewis (quarterback), Workman (left halfback), Schenk (right halfback), and Garrels (fullback). Chase of Michigan served as referee. Raymond Starbuck of Cornell was the umpire. The game was played in 20-minute halves.

=== At Ohio State ===
Michigan at Ohio State

Team	1	2	Total
• Michigan	0	6	6
Ohio State	0	0	0

- Date: October 20, 1906
- Location: University Park •Columbus, OH
- Game attendance: 6,000
- Referee: Inglis (Washington & Jefferson)

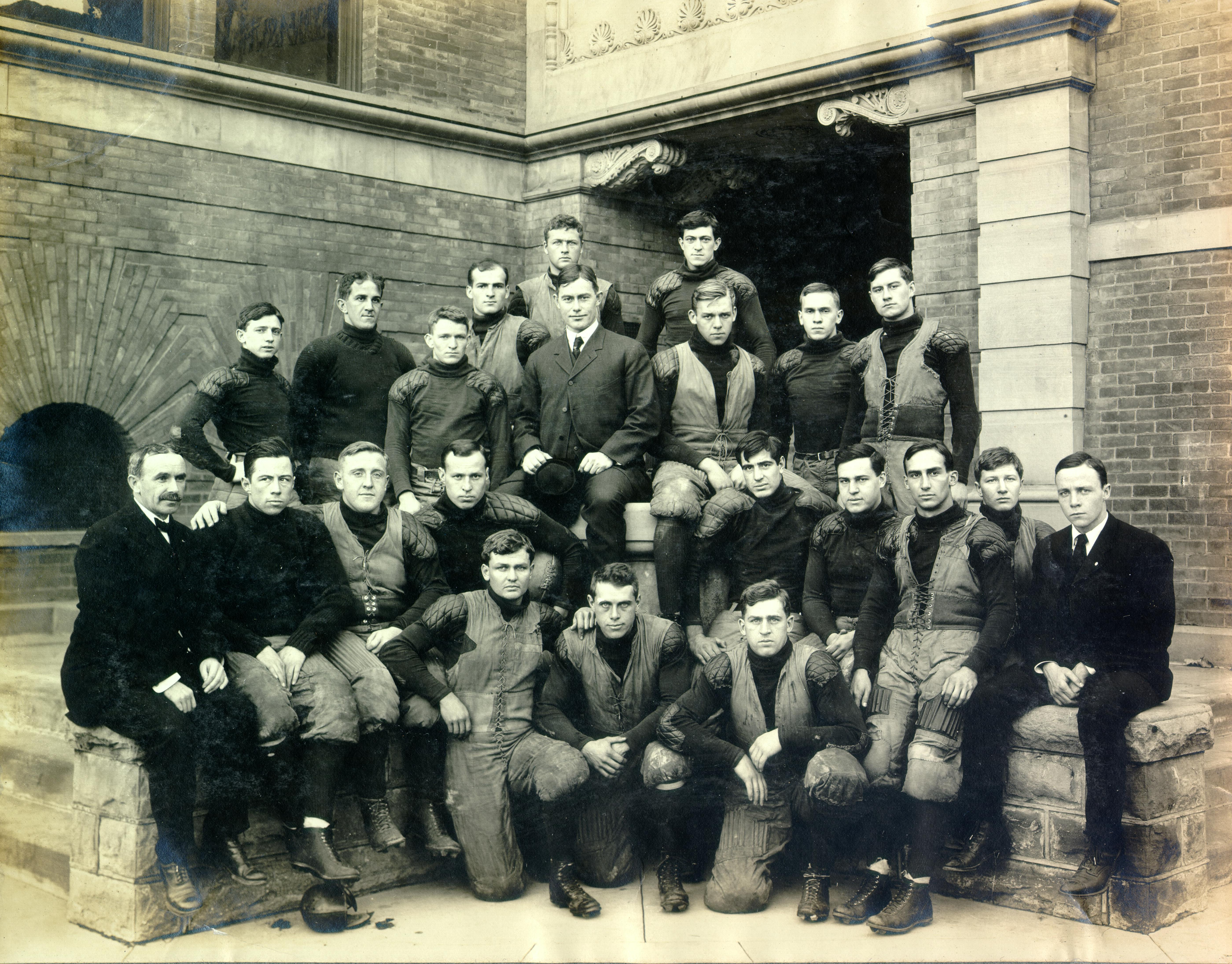
"1906 Football Team and Substitutes" from The Michigan Alumnus, November 1906

For its second game, Michigan defeated Ohio State, 6–0, before a crowd of 6,000 spectators at University Park in Columbus. A special train carried eleven coaches full of Michigan fans to Columbus, arriving one hour before the game started. The game was the eighth meeting in the Michigan–Ohio State football rivalry, with Michigan having won six of the prior meetings and tied once.

The game began shortly after 2:40 p.m., on a cool, but not uncomfortable Saturday afternoon. The game was scoreless for the first 56 minutes of play, as Michigan's offense struggled. The Chicago Daily Tribune attributed the sluggish offensive performance to the fact that Michigan's halfbacks, Ivan Steckle and Paul Magoffin, "were not in the best of shape," having arrived in Columbus on an excursion train a few minutes before the game began. They were rushed to the football field in an automobile and arrived in poor condition. Neither Magoffin nor Steckle had played in the season opener against Case.

With four minutes remaining in the game, John Garrels kicked a field goal from a difficult angle at the Ohio State 25-yard line to give Michigan a 4-0 lead. Garrels had attempted four earlier field goals in the game, all unsuccessful. The Chicago Daily Tribune noted, "Evidently the Wolverines placed all their reliance on Garrels, for the big fellow was constantly trying goal shots." With two minutes remaining, Ohio State's fullback, Gibson, attempted a punt from behind his goal line. Gibson dropped the ball on a poor snap from the sub center, Claggett, and fell on it, resulting in a safety that accounted for Michigan's final two points. On defense, Michigan held Ohio State to four first downs in the game. The Chicago Daily Tribune praised Jack Loell as "a whirlwind at center" who "sustained the heaviest attack of the Ohio backs and drove two of his opponents to the side lines and a third to making the poor pass which gave Michigan the last two points."

Michigan's lineup against Ohio State was Newton (left end), Curtis (left tackle), Eyke (left guard), Loell, (center), Graham (right guard), Patrick (right tackle), Embs (right end), Bishop (quarterback), Magoffin (left halfback), Steckle and Kanaga (right halfback), and Garrels (fullback). Wrenn of Harvard served as referee, and Hoagland of Princeton was the umpire. The game was played in 30-minute halves.

=== Illinois ===
Illinois at Michigan

Team	1	2	Total
Illinois	5	4	9
• Michigan	11	17	28

- Date: October 27, 1906
- Location: Ferry Field • Ann Arbor, MI
- Game attendance: 5,000
- Referee: McCornack (Dartmouth)

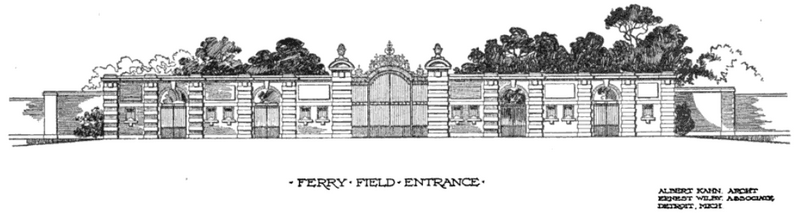
Architectural drawing for "Ferry Field Entrance" by architect Albert Kahn.

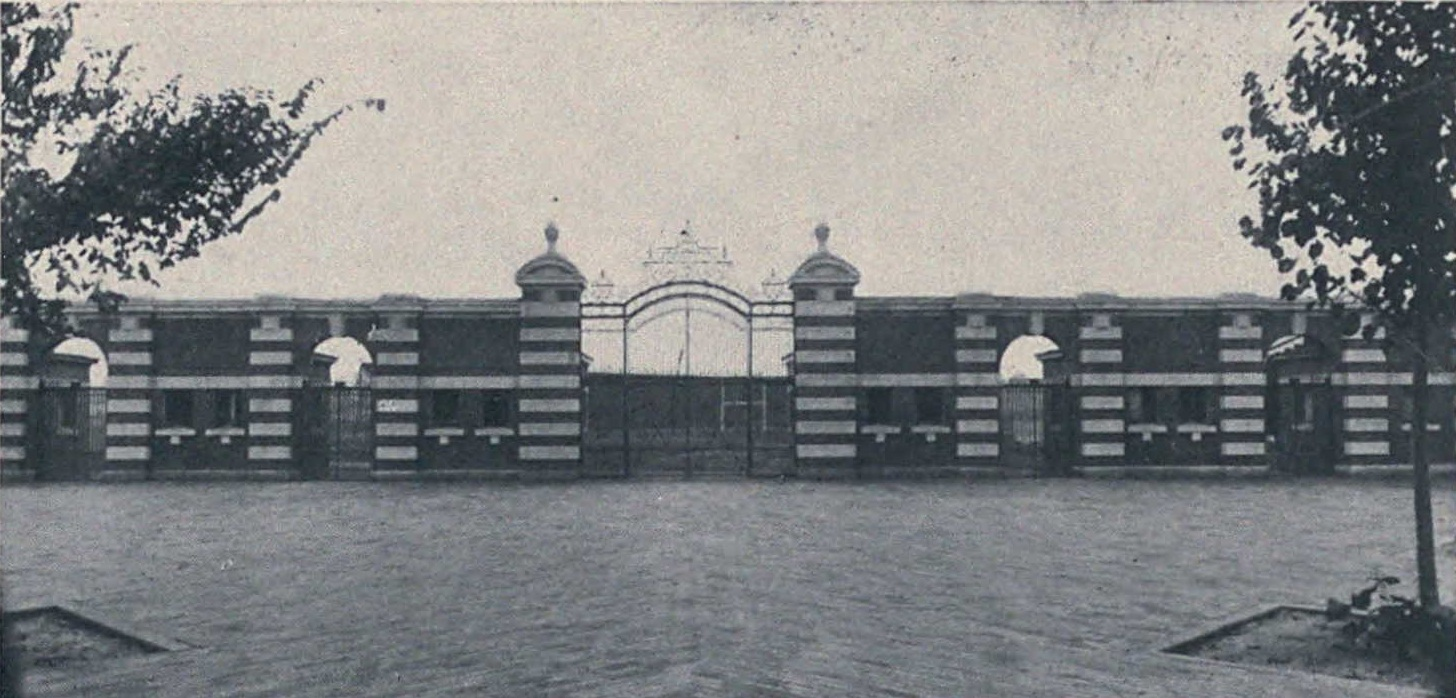
Front entrance and gates to the newly completed Ferry Field, c. October 1906

On October 27, 1906, Michigan defeated Illinois, 28–9, before a crowd estimated at close to 5,000 persons at Ferry Field. The game was the fifth between the two schools. Michigan had won all four of the prior games by a combined score of 62 to 5. The game was also Michigan's only contest in 1906 with a member of the Big Nine Conference.

The game began at 2:37 p.m., and was played on a soggy field resulting from "a constant rain of fourteen hours." The rain continued throughout the game, resulting in a slippery ball and numerous fumbles. Illinois turned the ball over four times on fumbles, and Michigan did so three times. In the Detroit Free Press, Joe S. Jackson wrote: "All during the game there was a heavy rainfall. . . . With a strong west wind driving this on a slant into the faces of one set of players, and down the necks of all the spectators the joy of the day was not extreme." On the first play of the game, John Garrels ran 90 yards for a touchdown. Joe S. Jackson wrote:

"Seldom does one see a run of ninety yards to a touchdown. . . . On the first kick-off, . . . Garrels got the ball on his own twenty-yard line. For twenty yards he went through the weaving mass of players, practically alone. Then interference began to form. Once or twice he was grabbed at, but shook off the tackler. How he got through is a marvel, unless the rain, beating directly into the faces of the Illini, partially blinded them. . . . He had gone by twenty-one men, friends and foes, when he touched the ball down behind the Illinois goal posts."

Joe Curtis kicked the extra point, and Michigan led, 6–0. Illinois scored a touchdown after a poor punt from deep in Michigan territory gave Illinois the ball at Michigan's 20-yard line. The umpire, Wren of Harvard, then called a 15-yard penalty against Michigan for "sideline coaching," moving the ball within two or three yards of the goal line. From there, Pinckney ran for the touchdown, but Green missed the extra point, and Michigan led, 6-5. The touchdown was the first allowed by Michigan since 1904. Before the half had ended, Joe Curtis scored a second touchdown for Michigan. The extra point failed, and Michigan led, 11–5, at halftime.

In the second half, Moynihan kicked a field goal for Illinois from the 40-yard line, narrowing Michigan's lead to 11–9. Michigan responded with three additional touchdowns. Curtis scored on a 20-yard run and then kicked the extra point to give Michigan a 17-9 lead. A short time later, Brooks of Illinois fumbled an on-side kick by Garrels, and Fred Newton fell on the loose ball behind Illinois' goal line. Michigan's final touchdown was set up by a 60-yard punt by Garrels that rolled almost to the goal line. Brooks was tackled at the five-yard line, and Illinois immediately sought to punt the ball out of danger. Joe Curtis leaped into the air at the 10-yard line, blocked the kick, and recovered the ball for Michigan's final touchdown. The extra point failed, and Michigan led, 28–9. According to Joe Jackson's account, the final ten minutes "was all punting, and enthusiasm began to ooze out as the rain oozed in."

Joe Curtis was Michigan's scoring leader with 18 points on three touchdowns and three extra points. The 1907 Michiganensian opined that the team was "at its best" against Illinois, with "eleven men in every play." Seward Cramer in the Detroit Free Press wrote that Yost had "three truly great players" in Garrels, Curtis and Loell. He noted the Curtis "played like a fiend" and called Loell "the find of the year." Cramer also expressed surprise at the improvement over the prior week: "Never has any such improvement been seen in a team in seven days time. Last Saturday, at Columbus, Michigan played a loafing, listless game. The backs did not get into their plays with any quickness. Something was wrong with the machinery, and during the past week Yost has taken apart the old machine, rearranged the gearing and put in a new driving wheel that makes the whole thing run so much more smoothly that the team that played Ohio State would look like a traction engine beside an easy running tourist auto." Michigan's trainer, Keene Fitzpatrick opined that the team was 50 to 75 percent better against Illinois than it was the prior week.

Michigan did not attempt any forward passes, but Illinois completed two passes "in beautiful style," demonstrating "how good the pass may be if it is gotten away with."

Michigan's lineup against Illinois was Curtis (left end), Loell (left tackle), Eyke (left guard), Clement (center), Graham (right guard), Patrick (right tackle), Newton (right end), Workman and Bishop (quarterback), Magoffin (left halfback), Rumney (right halfback), and Garrels (fullback). McCornack of Dartmouth served as referee with Wrenn of Harvard as umpire and Starbuck of Cornell as linesman. The game was played in 30-minute halves.

=== Vanderbilt ===
Vanderbilt at Michigan

Team	1	2	Total
Vanderbilt	0	4	4
• Michigan	4	6	10

- Date: November 3, 1906
- Location: Ferry Field • Ann Arbor, MI
- Game attendance: 10,000
- Referee: Elder

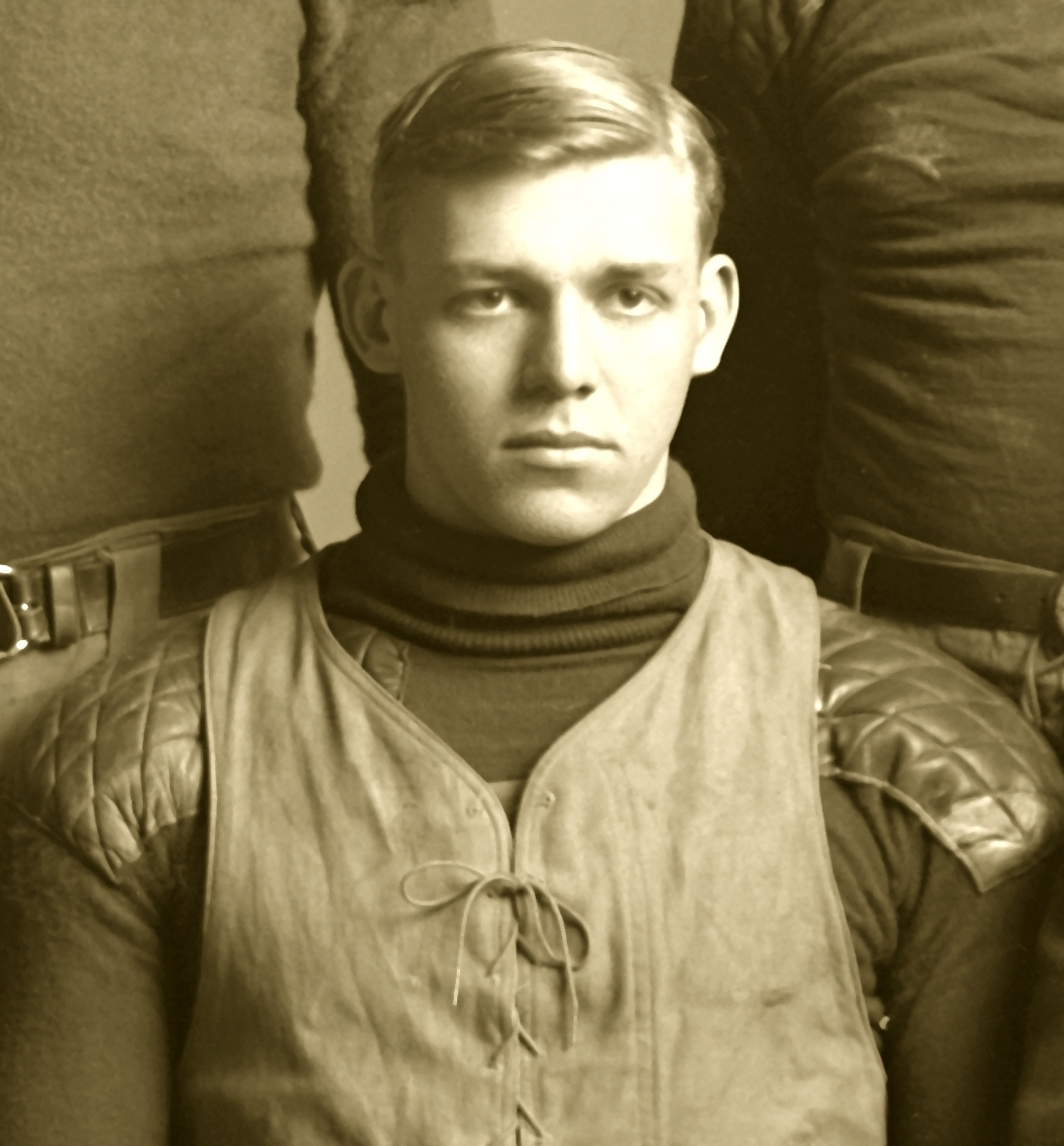
Fullback John Garrels broke world records in the discus thrown and high hurdles and won two Olympic medals.

On November 3, 1906, Michigan defeated Vanderbilt, 10–4, in front of a crowd of 10,000 at Ferry Field. The game matched Michigan head coach Fielding H. Yost against his former player and brother-in-law, Dan McGugin. McGugin's 1906 team was the dominant team in Southern football, defeating Alabama (78–0), Texas (45–0), Mississippi (29–0), Georgia Tech (37–6), and the Carlisle Indian School (4–0). Between 1905 and 1907, Vanderbilt lost only three games – all three of them to Michigan. On the night before the game, 4,200 students attended a mass meeting at University Hall. McGugin and Yost both spoke to the crowd and agreed that the game would be one of the closest played in Ann Arbor in many years. D. G. Fite, father-in-law of both McGugin and Yost, traveled from his home in Tennessee to watch the game.

John Garrels put Michigan ahead with a field goal from the 25-yard line. On the preceding drive, Garrels had completed a 15-yard forward pass to Bishop, the first legal forward pass completed by Michigan under the new rules. Michigan led, 4–0, at halftime. Early in the second half, Vanderbilt tied the score with a field goal by Dan Blake from the 30-yard line. The game remained tied at 4–4 until the closing minutes. With two minutes left in the game, Garrels ran 68 yards for a touchdown. The Chicago Daily Tribune wrote: "Garrels, on a fake kick, with splendid interference by Hammond, Curtis, and Workman, ran Vanderbilt's left end at lightning speed for sixty-eight yards and a touchdown." Curtis kicked the extra point, and Michigan led, 10–4.

Garrels, who scored nine of Michigan's ten points against Vanderbilt, was an outstanding athlete. He broke world records in the discus throw and high hurdles and won two medals in the 1908 Summer Olympics – a silver medal in the 110 meter hurdles and a bronze medal in the shot put. Following the Vanderbilt game, The Pittsburg Press wrote:

"Garrels is the best fullback in the West, and probably has no equal in the country. Weighing 200 pounds, he is a wonderfully speedy runner, capable of covering the 100 yards in 10 seconds. He is a fine punter, place and drop kicker, tackles well, and is a great line plunger."

Michigan's lineup against Vanderbilt was Curtis (left end), Loell (left tackle), Eyke (left guard), Clement (center), Graham (right guard), Patrick and Newton (right tackle), H. Hammond (right end), Workman (quarterback), Magoffin (left halfback), Bishop (right halfback), and Garrels (fullback). Elder of Penn State served as referee with Neil Snow of Michigan was the umpire and Eldridge of Michigan as the head linesman. The game was played in 30-minute halves.

=== Injury to Joe Curtis ===
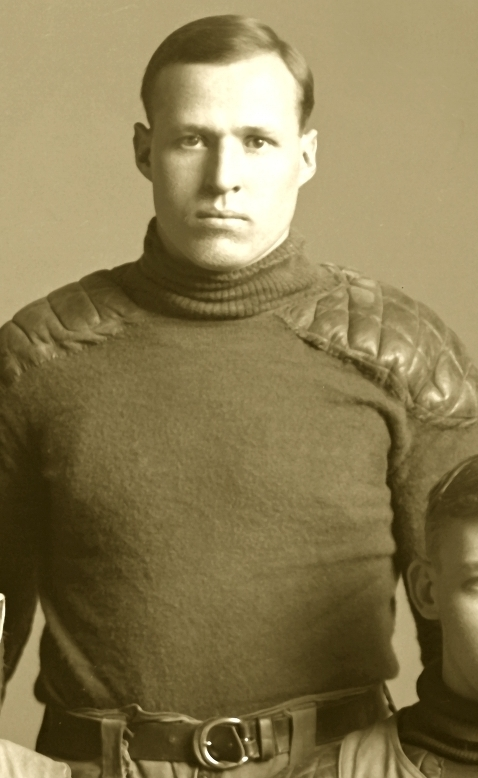
Michigan captain "Big Joe" Curtis

In the first four games of the 1906 football season, Joe Curtis started two games at left end and two games at left tackle. Michigan won those games by a combined score of 72 to 13. Curtis had been one of the leading scorers on Michigan's "Point-a-Minute" teams of 1904 (86 points on 11 touchdowns and 31 extra points) and 1905 (105 points on 15 touchdowns and 30 extra points).

Curtis's final game for Michigan was to have been the season finale against Penn. On November 10, 1906, one week before the Penn game, Curtis suffered a severely broken leg during a practice game. Curtis had not planned to play in the game, but the varsity was playing "listlessly" and had been held to a 0–0 score by the scrubs. Accordingly, Curtis put himself in the lineup at left end for the final three minutes in hopes of inspiring the team. The injury occurred as Curtis carried the ball. An end on the scrub team, Langley, fell trying to keep from being "boxed out." Curtis tripped on Langley and fell into a half somersault. In an attempt to protect his ankle, Curtis gathered his leg under him while in the air. The mass of players "fell in a heap on poor Curtis. 'Snap' went his left leg at a point between the knee and ankle. The noise of the breaking of the bones could be heard distinctly in the bleachers."

Trainer Keene Fitzpatrick walked onto the field to examine Curtis and quickly saw that the leg was broken. In what the Detroit Free Press described as "one of the most touching scenes ever witnessed on a football field," the crowd of 1,000 sitting in the bleachers fell silent and Michigan's quarterback, Harry Workman, "was seen to come out of the bunch of standing players, put his hands to his face, and break down and weep like a child." A surgeon who was in the stands came onto the field, examined Curtis, and called for an ambulance. The crowd sat silently as Curtis was "carefully placed on a stretcher" and into the hospital wagon. As the crowd finally walked slowly up State Street, the "gloom was awful." The Detroit Free Press wrote:

"Big Joe Curtis – one of the best fellows who ever went to college – who was acknowledged to be the best tackle in the west, and who was preparing himself to play the game of his life against Pennsylvania, the last college game in which he could ever participate, and who was practically certain of recognition for the All-American team, is down and out on the eve of what was to be the great climax of his spectacular football career. . . . 'G-L-O-O-M' spells Ann Arbor tonight."

Due to the seriousness of the injury, Curtis was hospitalized for several weeks and did not play in the Penn game.

=== At Penn ===
Michigan at Penn

Team	1	2	Total
Michigan	0	0	0
• Penn	6	11	17

- Date: November 17, 1906
- Location: Franklin Field • Philadelphia, PA

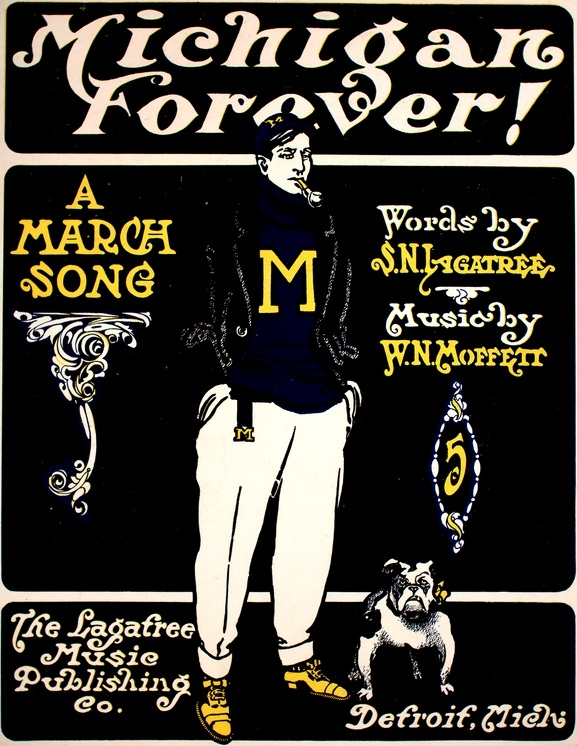
Sheet music for "Michigan Forever!" published in 1906

Michigan concluded its season on November 17, 1906, with a 17–0 loss to Penn in front of a crowd of nearly 26,000 spectators at Franklin Field in Philadelphia. The game was the second between Michigan and Penn. Penn won the first game in 1899, 11–10.

The start of the game was delayed by half an hour after Michigan head coach Fielding H. Yost sought a ruling that Penn's “tackle back” play (in which the tackle dropped back into the backfield as a ball carrier) was illegal under the new rules. The referee, Kelly, agreed with Yost and informed the Pennsylvania team. The Quakers refused to take the field in light of the ruling, and twenty minutes of wrangling followed. Yost reported after the game that the umpire Langford finally approached Yost and said, "Now, Mr. Yost, you act the gentleman and go on the field." According to the Detroit Free Press, the officials ruled that the play was legal if the a guard or tackle had both feet or both hands up to the line of scrimmage and waited until the snap to receive the ball.

With many of its best players either injured or academically disqualified, Michigan played an inexperienced group against Penn. Left guard Sam Davison was playing his first game for the Wolverines. Jack Loell replaced Curtis at left end and played his first game as an end. Walter Eyke and Fred Newton played only their second games at tackle, and Carl Clement played his third game at center.

With Curtis out of action, the Penn team focused on John Garrels. Early in the game, Michigan kept the ball in Penn territory, and Garrels narrowly missed a field goal from the 45-yard line. Also early in the first half, Penn's right tackle Gaston shoved Garrels to the ground after he had punted. The blow nearly knocked Garrels out of the game, and the head linesman called a penalty of 30 yards and ejected Gaston from the game. The Chicago Daily Tribune wrote that "Gaston slugged Garrels, knocking the big acting captain 'silly' for a few minutes and dazing him for the entire half." After the game, Michigan's trainer, Keene Fitzpatrick noted that "Garrels' face is badly disfigured for the time being." The Tribune also reported that Penn's fullback Hollenbach had kneed Michigan halfback Paul Magoffin in the face.

In the Detroit Free Press, Seward Cramer wrote: "The Pennsylvania men watched [Garrels] above all others, and he could not make a move that was not followed. . . . Eleven times did Johnny Garrels try the famous fake play that has worked against every other team this season. He would form for a punt and then try a dash for the harbor. But Scarlett and Levine, the scout boats, would intercept him, and in ten plays of this character he was thrown for a total loss of sixty-five yards, and in only one did he get away with the goods for any substantial gain. That was a run of twenty yards around Pennsylvania's left end." Cramer blamed the "almost total lack of interference" for Garrels' inability to gain through Penn's line. A soggy field was also blamed for slowing Garrels.

Penn's first touchdown was set up by a forward pass that took the ball to Michigan's 25-yard line. Penn then faked a field goal, and Hollenbach ran the ball to the two-yard line. Folwell then scored, and Penn led, 6–0, at halftime. At the start of the second half, Yost again protested the Penn's "tackle back" play in which the tackle was deployed in the backfield. The Penn team refused to accept Yost's interpretation and told him, "Take your team and go home." Rather than risk a disruption in the relations between the schools, Yost opted to lead his team back onto the field for the second half. Penn's captain and right halfback Green scored two touchdowns in the second half.

In a post-game interview, Coach Yost said: "Pennsylvania outplayed us. There are all sorts of 'buts' and 'ifs' that might be put in, but even if they were the Quakers would have a good margin over us. Our line could not hold them, therefore our back field could not do anything on the offense."

In the Detroit Free Press, Joe S. Jackson wrote that Michigan fans considered the game the first real loss ever suffered by a Yost-coached team, the 2–0 loss to Chicago in 1905 having been dismissed as a fluke. Jackson noted, "However, Ann Arbor may now cut out the proud boast referred to. For a Yost-coached team was beaten today, and it was beaten good." The Chicago Daily Tribune wrote: "The Quakers simply trapped the Wolverine, slaughtered him, ripped off his hide, scraped it, and pegged it up to dry in the sun."

Michigan's lineup against Penn was Loell (left end), Eyke (left tackle), Davison (left guard), Clement (center), Graham (right guard), Newton (right tackle), Hammond (right end), Workman (quarterback), Magoffin (left halfback), Bishop and Rumney (right halfback), and Garrels (fullback). Kelly of Princeton served as referee with Langford of Trinity as the umpire and Foltz of Brown as the linesman. The game was played in 30-minute halves.

=== Post-season ===
Two Michigan players, Joe Curtis and John Garrels, were selected as first-team players on the All Western team of the Chicago Daily Tribune. The Tribune chose Curtis as a tackle even though he had been moved to end so he could be drawn back to run with the ball, in light of a rule change the prohibited a tackle from being drawn back behind the line unless he was five yards back of the line of scrimmage. Garrels was chosen at fullback because of his "ability to kick and catch punts, to buck the line, or run the ends and dodge in the open." The Tribune opined that "Garrels is almost as valuable to a team as Eckersall, and if the eastern critics are nonpartisan they will place upon the All-American team Garrels at full back and Eckersall at quarter back."

No Michigan players received first-team All-American honors from Walter Camp or Caspar Whitney. However, Garrels was selected as a second-team player by Camp.

== Players ==
=== Varsity letter winners ===
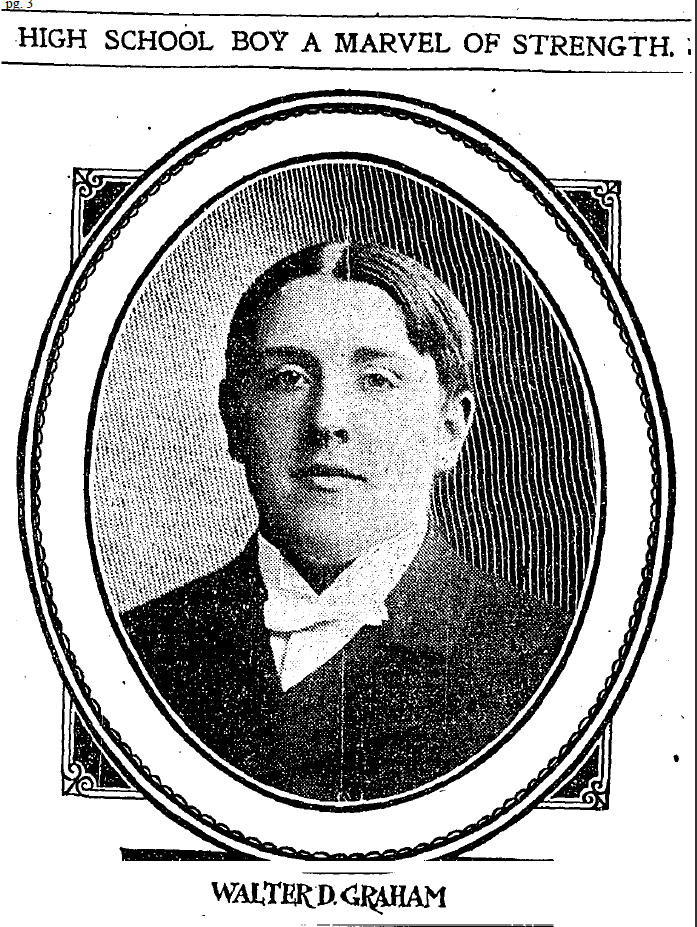
Right guard "Octy" Graham

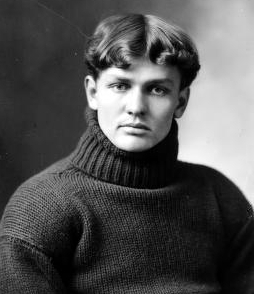
Left halfback Paul Magoffin

The following 14 players received varsity "M" letters for their participation on the 1906 football team:

- Harry S. Bishop, Chicago, Illinois – 2 games (Case and Ohio State) at quarterback, 2 games (Vanderbilt and Penn) at right halfback; also appeared against Illinois as a substitute at quarterback
- Carl H. Clement, Brooklyn, New York – started 3 games (Illinois, Vanderbilt, and Penn) at center
- Joe Curtis, Brooklyn, New York – started 2 games (Case and Ohio State) at left tackle, 2 games at left end (Illinois and Vanderbilt)
- Samuel J. Davison, Alpena, Michigan – started 1 game (Penn) at left guard
- Walter L. Eyke, Muskegon, Michigan – started 3 games (Ohio State, Illinois, and Vanderbilt) at left guard, 1 game (Penn) at left tackle
- John Garrels, Detroit, Michigan – started all 5 games at fullback
- Walter D. Graham, Chicago, Illinois – started all 5 games at right guard
- Harry S. Hammond, Chicago, Illinois – started 2 games (Vanderbilt and Penn) at right end
- John L. "Jack" Loell, Escanaba, Michigan – started 2 games (Case and Ohio State) at center, 2 games at left tackle (Illinois and Vanderbilt), 1 game at left end (Penn)
- Paul Magoffin, Washington, D.C. – started the last 4 games at left halfback
- Fred B. Newton, Portland, Oregon – started 1 game at left end (Ohio State), 1 game at right end (Illinois), 1 game at right tackle (Penn); also appeared as a substitute at right end against Case and at right tackle against Vanderbilt
- Harry E. Patrick, Detroit, Michigan – started 1 game at left guard (Case), 3 games at right tackle (Ohio State, Illinois, and Vanderbilt)
- Mason P. Rumney, Detroit, Michigan – 1 game at right halfback (Illinois); also appeared as a substitute at right halfback against Penn
- Harry A. Workman, Chicago, Illinois – started 3 games at quarterback (Vanderbilt, Illinois, and Penn), 1 game at left halfback (Case)

=== Reserves ===
The following 23 players received "R" letters for their participation on the 1906 football team:

- Thomas V. Bird, Mt. Valley, Illinois
- William M. Casey, Cedar Falls, Iowa
- Albert R. Chandler, Salem, Massachusetts
- Robert G. Chapman, San Antonio, Texas
- J. Blaine Coleman, Middleport, New York
- Maurice E. Crumpacker, Valparaiso, Indiana
- Frank Patrick Davey, Detroit, Michigan
- Harold P. Eastman, Battle Creek, Michigan
- William J. Embs, Escanaba, Michigan – started 2 games (Case and Ohio State) at right end
- Albert de Valois Evans, Cheboygan, Michigan
- Fred N. Featherstone, Conneaut, Ohio
- Allen C. Fullenwider, South Haven, Michigan
- John H. Guenther, Jamestown, New York
- George Guckenberger, Cincinnati, Ohio
- Ben Harris, Salt Lake City, Utah
- Howard K. Holland, Cassopolis, Michigan
- Eber D. Kanaga, Charlevoix, Michigan - appeared as a substitute at right halfback against Ohio State
- Joseph E. Kelly, Lowell, Michigan
- Jesse R. Langley, Alva, Oklahoma
- Ray Earl Ortner, Pueblo, Colorado
- Clayton J. Schenk, Chelsea, Michigan – started 1 game (Case) at right halfback
- Keith S. Simpson, Carrollton, Illinois
- Carl H. Spaanum, Nor Springs, Iowa
- Ivan X. Steckle, Freeport, Michigan - appeared 1 game (Ohio State) at right halfback
- Horace A. Treat, Adrian, Michigan
- William Wasmund, Detroit, Michigan
- James K. Watkins, Ann Arbor, Michigan
- George B. Wheeler, Cortland, New York
- Frederick T. Witmire, Ypsilanti, Michigan
- Arthur F. Wright, Waukegan, Illinois – appeared as a substitute at right tackle against Case

=== Others ===
- Charles Ruby – started 1 game (Case) at right tackle
- Davis - started 1 game (Case) at left end
- Lewis - appeared as a substitute at quarterback against Case

=== Scoring leaders ===
Player	Touchdowns	Extra points	Field goals	Safeties	Points
John Garrels	3	1	2	0	24
Joe Curtis	3	6	0	0	21
Harry Workman	2	0	0	0	10
Fred Newton	1	0	0	0	5
Clayton Schenk	1	0	0	0	5
Arthur Wright	1	0	0	0	5
n/a	0	0	0	1	2
Totals	11	7	2	1	72

== Awards and honors ==
- All-American: John Garrels (Camp, 2nd team)
- All-Conference: Joe Curtis (Chicago Tribune, 1st team), John Garrels (Chicago Tribune, 1st team)

== Coaching staff ==
- Head coach: Fielding H. Yost
- Trainer: Keene Fitzpatrick
- Manager: Lawrence C. Hull, Jr. (appointed); C. A. Lohmiller (resigned)
- Captain: John S. Curtis
