= Frank Hare =

American football and baseball player (1885–1961)

Biographical details
- Born: June 28, 1885; Noblesville, Indiana, U.S.
- Died: 1961 (aged 75–76); Indianapolis, Indiana, U.S.

Playing career

Football
- 1903–1906: Indiana

Baseball
- 1907: Sioux City Packers
- Position: Quarterback

Coaching career (HC unless noted)

Football
- 1907: Rose Polytechnic

Head coaching record
- Overall: 1–3–1

Accomplishments and honors

Awards
- All-Western (1906)

Frank K. "Bunny" Hare (June 28, 1885 – 1961) was an American football and minor league baseball player. He was also a college football coach.

== Indiana University ==
Hare was a quarterback for the Indiana University football team from 1903 to 1906.

== Minor League Baseball ==
Hare played 19 games for the Sioux City Packers of the Western League in 1907.

== College coaching ==
Hare served as the head football coach at the Rose Polytechnic Institute in Terre Haute, Indiana in 1907.
