= 1906 Minnesota Golden Gophers football team =

American college football season

1906 Minnesota Golden Gophers football

Western Conference co-champion
- Conference: Western Conference
- Record: 4–1 (2–0 Western)
- Head coach: Henry L. Williams (7th season)
- Captain: Earl Current
- Home stadium: Northrop Field

1906 Western Conference football standings
	Conf.					Overall
Team	W		L		T	W		L		T
Wisconsin +	3	–	0	–	0	5	–	0	–	0
Minnesota +	2	–	0	–	0	4	–	1	–	0
Michigan +	1	–	0	–	0	4	–	1	–	0
Chicago	3	–	1	–	0	4	–	1	–	0
Illinois	1	–	3	–	0	1	–	3	–	1
Iowa	0	–	1	–	0	2	–	3	–	0
Indiana	0	–	2	–	0	4	–	2	–	0
Purdue	0	–	3	–	0	0	–	5	–	0
+ – Conference co-champions

The 1906 Minnesota Golden Gophers football team represented the University of Minnesota in the 1906 college football season. In their sixth year under head coach Henry L. Williams, the Golden Gophers compiled a 4–1 record (2–0 against Western Conference opponents) and outscored all opponents 47 to 29.

The team featured a 1906 All-America — end Bobby Marshall, tapped by Walter Camp for his second team. Marshall was a pioneer African-American collegiate player.

== Schedule ==
Date	Opponent	Site	Result	Attendance
October 27	Iowa State*	Northrop Field; Minneapolis, MN	W 22–4	3,000
November 3	Nebraska*	Northrop Field; Minneapolis, MN (rivalry)	W 13–0	5,000
November 10	at Chicago	Marshall Field; Chicago, IL	W 4–2	7,000
November 17	Carlisle*	Northrop Field; Minneapolis, MN	L 0–17	20,000
November 24	Indiana	Northrop Field; Minneapolis, MN	W 8–6	10,000
*Non-conference game
