= 1906 Indiana Hoosiers football team =

American college football season

1906 Indiana Hoosiers football
- Conference: Western Conference
- Record: 4–2 (0–2 Western)
- Head coach: James M. Sheldon (2nd season)
- Captain: Frank Wade
- Home stadium: Jordan Field

1906 Western Conference football standings
	Conf.					Overall
Team	W		L		T	W		L		T
Wisconsin +	3	–	0	–	0	5	–	0	–	0
Minnesota +	2	–	0	–	0	4	–	1	–	0
Michigan +	1	–	0	–	0	4	–	1	–	0
Chicago	3	–	1	–	0	4	–	1	–	0
Illinois	1	–	3	–	0	1	–	3	–	1
Iowa	0	–	1	–	0	2	–	3	–	0
Indiana	0	–	2	–	0	4	–	2	–	0
Purdue	0	–	3	–	0	0	–	5	–	0
+ – Conference co-champions

The 1906 Indiana Hoosiers football team was an American football team that represented Indiana University Bloomington during the 1906 college football season. In their second season under head coach James M. Sheldon, the Hoosiers compiled a 4–2 record, finished in a tie for seventh place in the Western Conference, and outscored their opponents by a combined total of 109 to 46.

== Schedule ==
Date	Opponent	Site	Result	Attendance	Source
October 13	Indiana alumni*	Jordan Field; Bloomington, IN	W 16–0		
October 20	at Wabash*	Crawfordsville, IN	W 12–5		
October 27	at Chicago	Marshall Field; Chicago, IL	L 8–33		
November 3	DePauw*	Jordan Field; Bloomington, IN	W 55–0		
November 10	vs. Notre Dame*	Indianapolis, IN	W 12–0		
November 24	at Minnesota	Northrop Field; Minneapolis, MN	L 6–8	10,000	
*Non-conference game
