= Ed Parry =

American football player and coach (1885–1966)

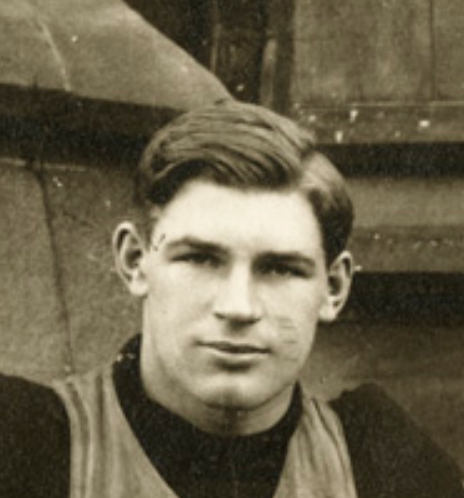

Biographical details
- Born: March 11, 1885; Albia, Iowa, U.S.
- Died: November 30, 1966 (aged 81); Kern County, California, U.S.

Playing career

Football
- 1904–1906: Chicago

Football
- c. 1905: Chicago
- Positions: Tackle (football); Hammer throw (track and field)

Coaching career (HC unless noted)

Football
- 1907: Kansas
- 1908: Oklahoma A&M

Track and field
- 1907: South Dakota

Head coaching record
- Overall: 4–4 (football)

Accomplishments and honors

Awards
- First-team All-Western (1906)

Edwin Eugene Parry (March 11, 1885 – November 30, 1966) was an American college football player and coach and track and field athlete and coach. He served as the head football coach at Oklahoma Agricultural and Mechanical College—now known as Oklahoma State University—for one season, in 1908, compiling a record of 4–4.

Perry attended the University of Chicago, where he played football as a tackle under head coach Amos Alonzo Stagg. He also competed in the hammer throw for Chicago's track and field team, of which he was elected captain for the 1906 season.

Parry coached the track team at the University of South Dakota in the spring of 1907. He assisted A. R. Kennedy in coaching the football team at the University of Kansas in the fall 1907.

== Head coaching record ==
=== Football ===
Year	Team	Overall	Conference	Standing
Oklahoma A&M Aggies (Independent) (1908)
1908	Oklahoma A&M	4–4		
Oklahoma A&M:		4–4		
Total:		4–4		
