= Chicago–Purdue football rivalry =

American college football rivalry

- Chicago Maroons Purdue Boilermakers
- First meeting: November 19, 1892; Purdue, 38–0
- Latest meeting: October 17, 1936; Purdue, 35–7
- Next meeting: Series defunct since 1936

Statistics
- Total meetings: 42
- All-time series: Chicago leads, 27–14–1
- Largest victory: Chicago, 56–0 (1907)
- Longest win streak: Chicago, 16 (1902–1917)
- Current win streak: Purdue, 9 (1928–1936)

Locations of Chicago and Purdue

The Chicago–Purdue football rivalry was an American college football rivalry between the Chicago Maroons and Purdue Boilermakers. Chicago leads the series 27–14–1. The series was first played in 1892. The rivalry has not been played since 1936.

== Game results ==
Chicago victories	Purdue victories	Tie games

No.	Date	Location	Winner	Score
1	November 19, 1892	West Lafayette, IN	Purdue	38–0
2	October 25, 1893	West Lafayette, IN	Purdue	20–10
3	November 3, 1894	Chicago, IL	Purdue	10–6
4	November 5, 1898	Chicago, IL	Chicago	17–0
5	November 25, 1899	Chicago, IL	Chicago	29–0
6	October 6, 1900	Chicago, IL	Chicago	17–5
7	October 12, 1901	Chicago, IL	Tie	5–5
8	October 11, 1902	Chicago, IL	Chicago	33–0
9	October 10, 1903	Chicago, IL	Chicago	22–0
10	October 8, 1904	Chicago, IL	Chicago	20–0
11	November 11, 1905	Chicago, IL	Chicago	19–0
12	October 20, 1906	Chicago, IL	Chicago	39–0
13	November 9, 1907	Chicago, IL	Chicago	56–0
14	October 3, 1908	Chicago, IL	Chicago	39–0
15	October 2, 1909	Chicago, IL	Chicago	40–0
16	November 5, 1910	Chicago, IL	Chicago	14–5
17	October 14, 1911	Chicago, IL	Chicago	11–3
18	October 26, 1912	Chicago, IL	Chicago	7–0
19	October 25, 1913	Chicago, IL	Chicago	6–0
20	October 24, 1914	Chicago, IL	Chicago	21–0
21	October 23, 1915	Chicago, IL	Chicago	7–0
22	November 4, 1916	Chicago, IL	Chicago	16–7

No.	Date	Location	Winner	Score
23	October 20, 1917	Chicago, IL	Chicago	27–0
24	November 2, 1918	West Lafayette, IN	Purdue	7–3
25	October 18, 1919	Chicago, IL	Chicago	16–0
26	October 9, 1920	Chicago, IL	Chicago	20–0
27	October 8, 1921	Chicago, IL	Chicago	9–0
28	October 21, 1922	Chicago, IL	Chicago	12–0
29	October 27, 1923	Chicago, IL	Chicago	20–6
30	November 1, 1924	Chicago, IL	Chicago	19–6
31	October 31, 1925	Chicago, IL	Chicago	6–0
32	October 23, 1926	Chicago, IL	Purdue	6–0
33	October 15, 1927	Chicago, IL	Chicago	7–6
34	October 27, 1928	Chicago, IL	Purdue	40–0
35	October 26, 1929	Chicago, IL	Purdue	26–0
36	November 8, 1930	Chicago, IL	Purdue	26–7
37	October 31, 1931	Chicago, IL	Purdue	14–6
38	November 5, 1932	Chicago, IL	Purdue	37–0
39	October 21, 1933	Chicago, IL	Purdue	14–0
40	November 3, 1934	Chicago, IL	Purdue	26–20
41	October 19, 1935	Chicago, IL	Purdue	19–0
42	October 17, 1936	Chicago, IL	Purdue	35–7
Series: Chicago leads 27–14–1

== See also ==
- List of NCAA college football rivalry games
