= Iowa–Wisconsin football rivalry =

American college football rivalry

Battle for the Heartland
- Iowa Hawkeyes Wisconsin Badgers
- First meeting: October 29, 1894
- Latest meeting: October 31, 2026
- Next meeting: TBA 2027
- Trophy: Heartland Trophy

Statistics
- Total meetings: 100
- All-time series: 49–49–2 (.500)
- Trophy series: Iowa leads, 11–10
- Largest victory: Wisconsin, 44–0 (1894)
- Longest win streak: Iowa, 10 (1985–1996)
- Longest unbeaten streak: Iowa, 18 (1977–1996)
- Current win streak: Iowa, 5 (2022–present)

Locations of Iowa and Wisconsin

The Iowa–Wisconsin football rivalry, also known as the Battle for the Heartland, is an American college football rivalry between the Iowa Hawkeyes and Wisconsin Badgers. Both schools have competed as members of the Big Ten Conference since 1900 (Wisconsin since 1896).

== History ==
The Heartland Trophy is a brass bull that is presented to the winner of the annual game. Although the rivalry is over 100 years old, the trophy is relatively new. It was first presented in 2004 to Iowa, when they defeated Wisconsin 30–7 to claim a share of the conference title. In 2005, Iowa spoiled the last home game for Wisconsin head coach Barry Alvarez, defeating the Badgers at a rain-soaked Camp Randall Stadium 20–10. The Badgers took possession of the trophy for the first time in 2006, defeating Iowa 24–21 in a back-and-forth affair. Wisconsin evened the Heartland Trophy series in 2007, winning another closely contested game 17–13, under the lights at Camp Randall. In 2008, Iowa took the lead in the trophy series with a lopsided 38–16 victory. The Hawkeyes' second-half performance was key again in 2009, as they won 20–10 in Madison. The 2010 game was decided in the final minute, as the Badgers scored a late touchdown for a 31–30 victory at Kinnick Stadium. As of the 2026 season, Iowa leads the trophy series 11–10.

Due to Big Ten expansion, Wisconsin and Iowa were placed in separate divisions, ostensibly ending the annual rivalry after the 2010 season. The annual game resumed, however, during the 2014 season, when a new round of expansion (adding Maryland and Rutgers to the Big Ten), placed Wisconsin and Iowa together in the Big Ten West division. With the addition of Oregon, UCLA, USC and Washington to the conference in 2024, divisions were removed, ending the rivalry as a part of the Big Ten West. However, the rivalry was deemed 'protected' by the Big Ten in 2023, along with 11 other protected Big Ten rivalries that were declared after the latest conference expansion. This ensures the rivalry will continue annually.

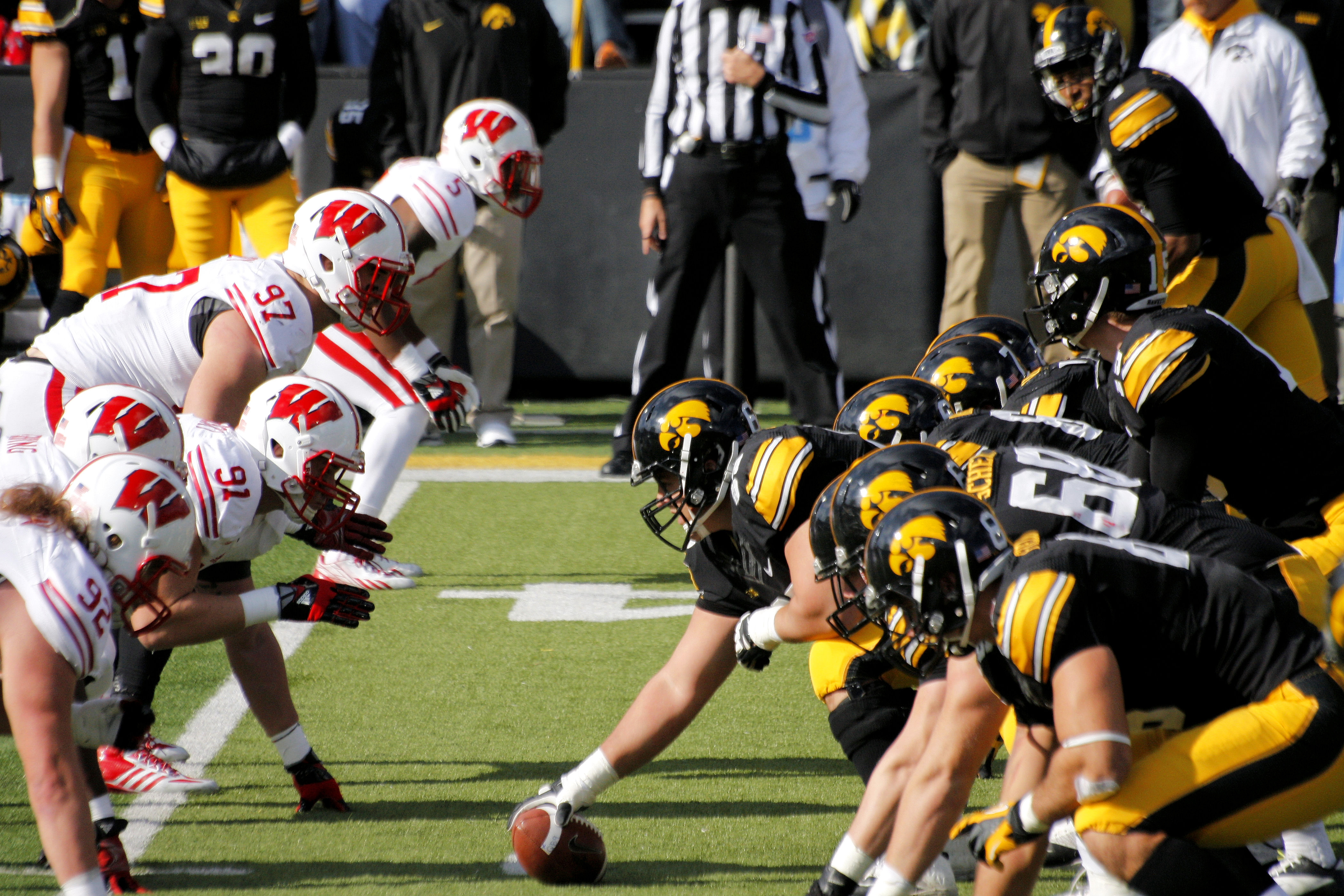
Iowa and Wisconsin facing off in Kinnick Stadium.

== Game results ==
Iowa victories	Wisconsin victories	Tie games

No.	Date	Location	Winning team		Losing team	
1	October 29, 1894	Madison, WI	Wisconsin	44	Iowa	0
2	November 3, 1906	Madison, WI	Wisconsin	18	Iowa	4
3	November 2, 1907	Iowa City, IA	Wisconsin	6	Iowa	5
4	November 4, 1911	Madison, WI	Wisconsin	12	Iowa	0
5	November 23, 1912	Iowa City, IA	Wisconsin	28	Iowa	10
6	October 27, 1917	Madison, WI	Wisconsin	20	Iowa	0
7	November 15, 1924	Madison, WI	Iowa	21	Wisconsin	7
8	November 7, 1925	Iowa City, IA	Wisconsin	6	Iowa	0
9	November 13, 1926	Madison, WI	Wisconsin	20	Iowa	10
10	November 12, 1927	Madison, WI	Iowa	16	Wisconsin	0
11	November 17, 1928	Iowa City, IA	Wisconsin	13	Iowa	0
12	October 26, 1929	Madison, WI	Iowa	14	Wisconsin	0
13	October 8, 1932	Madison, WI	Wisconsin	34	Iowa	0
14	October 21, 1933	Iowa City, IA	Iowa	26	Wisconsin	7
15	October 16, 1937	Madison, WI	Wisconsin	13	Iowa	6
16	October 8, 1938	Iowa City, IA	Wisconsin	31	Iowa	13
17	October 28, 1939	Madison, WI	Iowa	19	Wisconsin	13
18	October 12, 1940	Iowa City, IA	Iowa	30	Wisconsin	12
19	October 18, 1941	Madison, WI	Wisconsin	23	Iowa	0
20	November 7, 1942	Iowa City, IA	Iowa	6	#2 Wisconsin	0
21	October 2, 1943	Iowa City, IA	Wisconsin	7	Iowa	5
22	November 11, 1944	Madison, WI	Wisconsin	26	Iowa	7
23	November 3, 1945	Iowa City, IA	Wisconsin	27	Iowa	7
24	November 9, 1946	Madison, WI	Iowa	21	#15 Wisconsin	7
25	November 8, 1947	Madison, WI	#19 Wisconsin	46	Iowa	14
26	October 30, 1948	Iowa City, IA	Iowa	19	Wisconsin	13
27	November 12, 1949	Madison, WI	Wisconsin	35	Iowa	13
28	October 14, 1950	Iowa City, IA	#15 Wisconsin	14	Iowa	0
29	November 17, 1951	Madison, WI	#8 Wisconsin	34	Iowa	7
30	October 18, 1952	Iowa City, IA	#12 Wisconsin	42	Iowa	13
31	October 31, 1953	Madison, WI	Wisconsin	10	Iowa	6
32	October 30, 1954	Iowa City, IA	Iowa	13	#8 Wisconsin	7
33	October 1, 1955	Madison, WI	#17 Wisconsin	37	#14 Iowa	14
34	October 13, 1956	Iowa City, IA	Iowa	13	Wisconsin	7
35	October 19, 1957	Iowa City, IA	#6 Iowa	21	#13 Wisconsin	7
36	October 18, 1958	Madison, WI	#13 Iowa	20	#4 Wisconsin	9
37	October 17, 1959	Madison, WI	Wisconsin	25	#9 Iowa	16
38	October 15, 1960	Iowa City, IA	#2 Iowa	28	#12 Wisconsin	21
39	October 21, 1961	Iowa City, IA	#4 Iowa	47	Wisconsin	15
40	October 20, 1962	Madison, WI	#10 Wisconsin	42	Iowa	14
41	October 19, 1963	Iowa City, IA	#2 Wisconsin	10	Iowa	7
42	October 17, 1964	Madison, WI	Wisconsin	31	Iowa	21
43	October 2, 1965	Madison, WI	Wisconsin	16	Iowa	13
44	October 1, 1966	Iowa City, IA	Wisconsin	7	Iowa	0
45	October 21, 1967	Madison, WI	Tie	21	Tie	21
46	October 19, 1968	Iowa City, IA	Iowa	41	Wisconsin	0
47	October 11, 1969	Madison, WI	Wisconsin	23	Iowa	17
48	October 10, 1970	Iowa City, IA	Iowa	24	Wisconsin	14
49	October 30, 1971	Iowa City, IA	Iowa	20	Wisconsin	16
50	November 4, 1972	Madison, WI	Wisconsin	16	Iowa	14
51	November 10, 1973	Madison, WI	Wisconsin	35	Iowa	7
52	November 9, 1974	Iowa City, IA	Wisconsin	28	Iowa	15
53	November 8, 1975	Iowa City, IA	Iowa	45	Wisconsin	28
54	November 6, 1976	Madison, WI	Wisconsin	38	Iowa	21
55	November 12, 1977	Madison, WI	Iowa	24	Wisconsin	8
56	November 18, 1978	Iowa City, IA	Iowa	38	Wisconsin	24
57	October 27, 1979	Madison, WI	Iowa	24	Wisconsin	13
58	November 1, 1980	Iowa City, IA	Iowa	22	Wisconsin	13
59	November 14, 1981	Madison, WI	Iowa	17	Wisconsin	7
60	November 13, 1982	Iowa City, IA	Iowa	28	Wisconsin	14
61	November 5, 1983	Madison, WI	#15 Iowa	34	Wisconsin	14
62	November 3, 1984	Iowa City, IA	Tie	10	Tie	10
63	October 12, 1985	Madison, WI	#1 Iowa	23	Wisconsin	13
64	October 11, 1986	Iowa City, IA	#10 Iowa	17	Wisconsin	6
65	October 10, 1987	Madison, WI	Iowa	31	Wisconsin	10
66	October 8, 1988	Iowa City, IA	Iowa	31	Wisconsin	6
67	October 14, 1989	Madison, WI	Iowa	31	Wisconsin	24
68	October 13, 1990	Iowa City, IA	#25 Iowa	30	Wisconsin	10
69	October 12, 1991	Madison, WI	Iowa	10	Wisconsin	6
70	October 10, 1992	Iowa City, IA	Iowa	23	Wisconsin	22
71	November 18, 1995	Madison, WI	Iowa	33	Wisconsin	20
72	November 16, 1996	Iowa City, IA	Iowa	31	Wisconsin	0
73	November 8, 1997	Madison, WI	Wisconsin	13	#12 Iowa	10
74	October 24, 1998	Iowa City, IA	#9 Wisconsin	31	Iowa	0
75	November 13, 1999	Madison, WI	#9 Wisconsin	41	Iowa	3
76	October 28, 2000	Iowa City, IA	Wisconsin	13	Iowa	7
77	November 3, 2001	Madison, WI	Wisconsin	34	Iowa	28
78	November 2, 2002	Iowa City, IA	#9 Iowa	20	Wisconsin	3
79	November 20, 2003	Madison, WI	#17 Iowa	27	Wisconsin	21
80	November 20, 2004	Iowa City, IA	#17 Iowa	30	#9 Wisconsin	7
81	November 12, 2005	Madison, WI	Iowa	20	#19 Wisconsin	10
82	November 11, 2006	Iowa City, IA	#16 Wisconsin	24	Iowa	21
83	September 22, 2007	Madison, WI	#9 Wisconsin	17	Iowa	13
84	October 18, 2008	Iowa City, IA	Iowa	38	Wisconsin	16
85	October 17, 2009	Madison, WI	#11 Iowa	20	Wisconsin	10
86	October 23, 2010	Iowa City, IA	#11 Wisconsin	31	#13 Iowa	30
87	November 2, 2013	Iowa City, IA	#23 Wisconsin	28	Iowa	9
88	November 22, 2014	Iowa City, IA	#14 Wisconsin	26	Iowa	24
89	October 3, 2015	Madison, WI	Iowa	10	#19 Wisconsin	6
90	October 22, 2016	Iowa City, IA	#10 Wisconsin	17	Iowa	9
91	November 11, 2017	Madison, WI	#6 Wisconsin	38	#25 Iowa	14
92	September 22, 2018	Iowa City, IA	#18 Wisconsin	28	Iowa	17
93	November 9, 2019	Madison, WI	#14 Wisconsin	24	#19 Iowa	22
94	December 12, 2020	Iowa City, IA	#19 Iowa	28	#25 Wisconsin	7
95	October 30, 2021	Madison, WI	Wisconsin	27	#9 Iowa	7
96	November 12, 2022	Iowa City, IA	Iowa	24	Wisconsin	10
97	October 14, 2023	Madison, WI	Iowa	15	Wisconsin	6
98	November 2, 2024	Iowa City, IA	Iowa	42	Wisconsin	10
99	October 11, 2025	Madison, WI	Iowa	37	Wisconsin	0
100	October 31, 2026	Iowa City, IA	Iowa	30	#25 Wisconsin	0
Series: Tied 49–49–2
Rankings from the AP Poll

== See also ==
- List of NCAA college football rivalry games
- List of most-played college football series in NCAA Division I
