= 1909 Tulane Olive and Blue football team =

American college football season

1909 Tulane Olive and Blue football
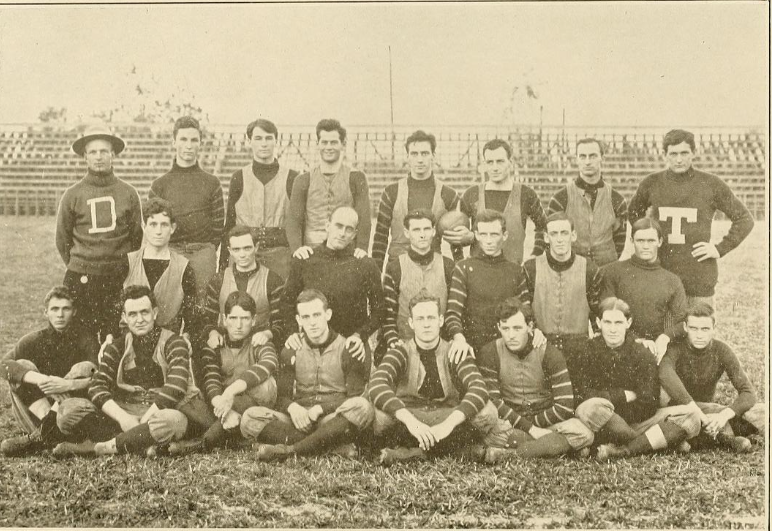

Bacardi Bowl, L 0–11 vs. Cuban Athletic Club
- Conference: Independent
- Record: 4–3–2
- Head coach: R. R. Brown (1st season)
- Captain: H. Tate Moore
- Home stadium: Pelican Park; Tulane Stadium

1909 Southern college football independents records
	Conf.			Overall
Team	W	L	T	W		L		T
Arkansas		–		7	–	0	–	0
Texas A&M		–		7	–	0	–	1
Mississippi College		–		3	–	0	–	0
Stetson		–		3	–	0	–	1
Kentucky State		–		9	–	1	–	0
Virginia		–		7	–	1	–	0
North Carolina A&M		–		6	–	1	–	0
VPI		–		6	–	1	–	0
Florida		–		6	–	1	–	1
Elon		–		4	–	1	–	0
Louisiana Industrial		–		4	–	1	–	0
Spring Hill		–		4	–	1	–	0
Catholic University		–		0	–	1	–	1
North Carolina		–		5	–	2	–	0
Birmingham		–		4	–	2	–	0
Kendall		–		2	–	1	–	0
Southwestern Louisiana Industrial		–		5	–	2	–	2
Marshall		–		3	–	2	–	1
VMI		–		4	–	3	–	0
Navy		–		4	–	3	–	1
Texas		–		4	–	3	–	1
Tulane		–		4	–	3	–	2
West Virginia		–		4	–	3	–	2
Washington and Lee		–		4	–	3	–	0
Oklahoma		–		6	–	4	–	0
Georgetown		–		3	–	2	–	1
Oklahoma A&M		–		5	–	3	–	0
Davidson		–		3	–	4	–	2
George Washington		–		3	–	4	–	1
Chattanooga		–		2	–	3	–	2
Wake Forest		–		2	–	4	–	0
Maryland		–		2	–	5	–	0
South Carolina		–		2	–	6	–	0
Delaware		–		1	–	6	–	1

The 1909 Tulane Olive and Blue football team was an American football team that represented Tulane University as an independent during the 1909 college football season. In its first year under head coach R. R. Brown, Tulane compiled a 4–3–2 record and was outscored by a total of 50 to 40.

Tulane began its season with a "practice game" against the New Orleans Young Men's Gymnastics Club. The regular season began on October 16 with a victory over Ole Miss and concluded on November 25 with a loss to SouthWestern (TX). The team concluded its season with a post-season game on New Year's Day in Havana, Cuba.

== Schedule ==
Date	Time	Opponent	Site	Result	Attendance	Source
October 9	3:30 p.m.	New Orleans YMGC	Pelican Park; New Orleans, LA	W 12–0	1,000	
October 16	3:30 p.m.	Ole Miss	Pelican Park; New Orleans, LA (rivalry)	W 5–0		
October 23	3:30 p.m.	Central University	Tulane Stadium; New Orleans, LA	L 0–6		
October 30		Mississippi A&M	Tulane Stadium; New Orleans, LA	W 2–0		
November 6		Cincinnati	Tulane Stadium; New Orleans, LA	W 6–0		
November 13		Texas	Tulane Stadium; New Orleans, LA	T 10–10		
November 20		Alabama	Tulane Stadium; New Orleans, LA	T 5–5		
November 25		Southwestern (TX)	Tulane Stadium; New Orleans, LA	L 0–18		
January 1, 1910		at Cuban Athletic Club	Almandares Park; Havana, Cuba (Bacardi Bowl)	L 0–11		
All times are in Central time

== Players ==
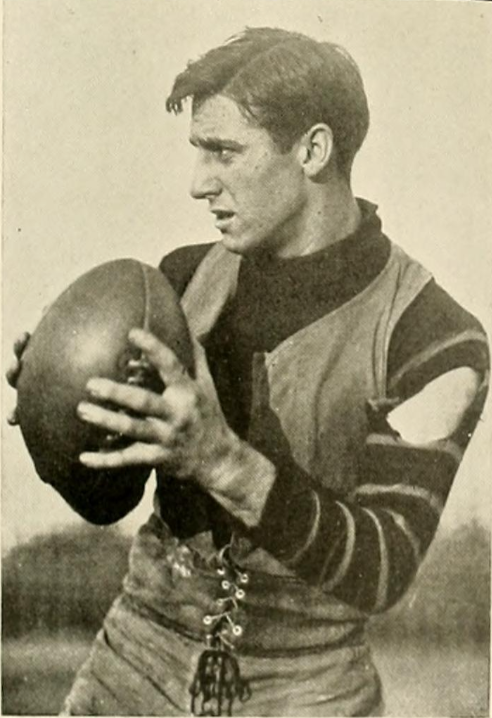
Tate Moore

- "Nick" Callan, line
- Albert Dreyfuss, halfback
- "Tubby" Ellis, center on offense, tackle on defense
- "Bert" Ferrell
- "Bookie" George, end and quarterback
- "Dick" Kock, center
- Lester, end
- "Tommy" Martin, tackle/guard
- "Lanky" McCloud
- Tate Moore, captain and fullback
- "Johnnie" Nix
- Nauman Scott, end
- "Skinny" Scott, right halfback on offense, quarterback on defense
- Sentelle, left tackle
- Semmes Walmsley, left halfback
- Clyde Webb, tackle
- Whisnant
