= 1909 Wake Forest Baptists football team =

American college football season

1909 Wake Forest Baptists football
- Conference: Independent
- Record: 2–4
- Head coach: A. T. Myers (1st season)
- Captain: L. W. Leggett

1909 Southern college football independents records
	Conf.			Overall
Team	W	L	T	W		L		T
Arkansas		–		7	–	0	–	0
Texas A&M		–		7	–	0	–	1
Mississippi College		–		3	–	0	–	0
Stetson		–		3	–	0	–	1
Kentucky State		–		9	–	1	–	0
Virginia		–		7	–	1	–	0
North Carolina A&M		–		6	–	1	–	0
VPI		–		6	–	1	–	0
Florida		–		6	–	1	–	1
Elon		–		4	–	1	–	0
Louisiana Industrial		–		4	–	1	–	0
Spring Hill		–		4	–	1	–	0
Catholic University		–		0	–	1	–	1
North Carolina		–		5	–	2	–	0
Birmingham		–		4	–	2	–	0
Kendall		–		2	–	1	–	0
Southwestern Louisiana Industrial		–		5	–	2	–	2
Marshall		–		3	–	2	–	1
VMI		–		4	–	3	–	0
Navy		–		4	–	3	–	1
Texas		–		4	–	3	–	1
Tulane		–		4	–	3	–	2
West Virginia		–		4	–	3	–	2
Washington and Lee		–		4	–	3	–	0
Oklahoma		–		6	–	4	–	0
Georgetown		–		3	–	2	–	1
Oklahoma A&M		–		5	–	3	–	0
Davidson		–		3	–	4	–	2
George Washington		–		3	–	4	–	1
Chattanooga		–		2	–	3	–	2
Wake Forest		–		2	–	4	–	0
Maryland		–		2	–	5	–	0
South Carolina		–		2	–	6	–	0
Delaware		–		1	–	6	–	1

The 1909 Wake Forest Baptists football team was an American football team that represented Wake Forest College (now known as Wake Forest University) as an independent during the 1909 college football season. In their first year under head coach A. T. Myers, the team compiled a 2–4 record.

== Schedule ==
Date	Opponent	Site	Result	Source
October 2	at North Carolina	Campus Athletic Field; Chapel Hill, NC (rivalry)	L 0–18	
October 4	Maryville (TN)	Wake Forest, NC	W 3–0	
October 16	at Washington and Lee	Wilson Field; Lexington, VA	L 0–17	
October 23	at South Carolina	Davis Field; Columbia, SC	W 8–0	
October 25	North Carolina Medical College	Wake Forest, NC	L 0–5	
November 5	Richmond	Wake Forest, NC	L 0–5	
