= Jesse R. Langley =

American lawyer

Biographical details
- Born: July 23, 1877; Kansas, U.S.
- Died: December 5, 1933 (aged 56); Pittsburgh, Pennsylvania, U.S.

Playing career

Football
- 1904–1907: Michigan

Coaching career (HC unless noted)

Football
- 1908–1909: TCU

Basketball
- 1908–1909: TCU

Head coaching record
- Overall: 11–5–1 (football); 2–3 (basketball)

Jesse Raymond Langley (July 23, 1877 – December 5, 1933) was an American football player and coach, patent attorney, and United States Army officer. He played college football for the University of Michigan from 1904 to 1907. Langley served as the head football coach at Texas Christian University (TCU) from 1908 to 1909, compiling a record of 11–5–1.

Langley was born in Kansas and raised in Oklahoma. At the time of the 1900 United States census, he was living with his parents, Franklin and Charlotte Langley, on the family's farm in Woods County, Oklahoma. Before attending the University of Michigan, Langley was a "critic teacher" in the preparatory department of Northwestern Oklahoma Normal School.

Langley received a Bachelor of Science degree in electrical engineering from Michigan in 1908. While attending Michigan, he played football for Fielding H. Yost's Michigan Wolverines football team from 1904 to 1907.

Langley was the head football coach at Texas Christian University from 1908 to 1909. He compiled a record of 11–5–1 in his two seasons as the head coach.

After retiring from football, Langley became a patent attorney. In 1912, he was employed as an assistant examiner at the U.S. Patent Office in Washington, D.C. Langley worked in the patent department at Westinghouse Electric & Mfg. Co. for 14 years. He later accepted a similar position with Koppers Co., where he worked for six years.

His career as a patent attorney was interrupted by military service during World War I. He served as a major in the infantry during the war and later held the rank of colonel in the Reserve Corps. During combat at the Golfe de Malancourt in France, he suffered machine gun wounds in both of his legs. According to one account, he had "both of his legs shattered by bullets from a German machine gun."

At the time of the 1930 United States census, Langley was living in Wilkinsburg, Pennsylvania with his wife, Margaret L. Langley, and was employed as an attorney in a law office. In December 1933, Langley died at his home in Pittsburgh, Pennsylvania at age 56.

== Head coaching record ==
=== Football ===
Year	Team	Overall	Conference	Standing	Bowl/playoffs
TCU (Independent) (1908)
1908	TCU	6–3			
TCU (Texas Intercollegiate Athletic Association) (1909)
1909	TCU	5–2–1	2–0		
TCU:		11–5–1	2–0		
Total:		11–5–1			
