= 1909 Maryland Aggies football team =

American college football season

1909 Maryland Aggies football
- Conference: Independent
- Record: 2–5
- Head coach: Edward Larkin (1st season) & William Lang (second season)

1909 Southern college football independents records
| | Conf. | | | Overall |
| Team | W | L | T | W | | L | | T |
|---|---|---|---|---|---|---|---|---|
| Arkansas | | – | | 7 | – | 0 | – | 0 |
| Texas A&M | | – | | 7 | – | 0 | – | 1 |
| Mississippi College | | – | | 3 | – | 0 | – | 0 |
| Stetson | | – | | 3 | – | 0 | – | 1 |
| Kentucky State | | – | | 9 | – | 1 | – | 0 |
| Virginia | | – | | 7 | – | 1 | – | 0 |
| North Carolina A&M | | – | | 6 | – | 1 | – | 0 |
| VPI | | – | | 6 | – | 1 | – | 0 |
| Florida | | – | | 6 | – | 1 | – | 1 |
| Elon | | – | | 4 | – | 1 | – | 0 |
| Louisiana Industrial | | – | | 4 | – | 1 | – | 0 |
| Spring Hill | | – | | 4 | – | 1 | – | 0 |
| Catholic University | | – | | 0 | – | 1 | – | 1 |
| North Carolina | | – | | 5 | – | 2 | – | 0 |
| Birmingham | | – | | 4 | – | 2 | – | 0 |
| Kendall | | – | | 2 | – | 1 | – | 0 |
| Southwestern Louisiana Industrial | | – | | 5 | – | 2 | – | 2 |
| Marshall | | – | | 3 | – | 2 | – | 1 |
| VMI | | – | | 4 | – | 3 | – | 0 |
| Navy | | – | | 4 | – | 3 | – | 1 |
| Texas | | – | | 4 | – | 3 | – | 1 |
| Tulane | | – | | 4 | – | 3 | – | 2 |
| West Virginia | | – | | 4 | – | 3 | – | 2 |
| Washington and Lee | | – | | 4 | – | 3 | – | 0 |
| Oklahoma | | – | | 6 | – | 4 | – | 0 |
| Georgetown | | – | | 3 | – | 2 | – | 1 |
| Oklahoma A&M | | – | | 5 | – | 3 | – | 0 |
| Davidson | | – | | 3 | – | 4 | – | 2 |
| George Washington | | – | | 3 | – | 4 | – | 1 |
| Chattanooga | | – | | 2 | – | 3 | – | 2 |
| Wake Forest | | – | | 2 | – | 4 | – | 0 |
| Maryland | | – | | 2 | – | 5 | – | 0 |
| South Carolina | | – | | 2 | – | 6 | – | 0 |
| Delaware | | – | | 1 | – | 6 | – | 1 |

The 1909 Maryland Aggies football team represented Maryland Agricultural College (later part of the University of Maryland) in the 1909 college football season. The Aggies compiled a 2–5 record, were shut out by five opponents, and were outscored by all opponents, 101 to 19. Edward Larkin and William Lang were the team's coaches.

== Schedule ==
| Date | Opponent | Site | Result | Source |
|---|---|---|---|---|
| September 25 | Washington Technical High School | College Park, MD | L 0–11 | |
| October 2 | at Richmond | Broad Street Park; Richmond, VA | L 0–12 | |
| October 9 | at Johns Hopkins | Homewood Field; Baltimore, MD | L 0–9 | |
| October 16 | Rock Hill College | College Park, MD | W 5–0 | |
| October 23 | at George Washington | American League Park; Washington, DC | L 0–26 | |
| October 30 | at North Carolina A&M | Riddick Stadium; Raleigh, NC | L 0–31 | |
| November 6 | at Gallaudet | Washington, DC | W 14–12 | |
