= 1909 Marshall Thundering Herd football team =

American college football season

1909 Marshall Thundering Herd football
- Conference: Independent
- Record: 3–2–1
- Head coach: Boyd Chambers (1st season)
- Captain: Ray Beuhring
- Home stadium: Central Field

1909 Southern college football independents records
	Conf.			Overall
Team	W	L	T	W		L		T
Arkansas		–		7	–	0	–	0
Texas A&M		–		7	–	0	–	1
Mississippi College		–		3	–	0	–	0
Stetson		–		3	–	0	–	1
Kentucky State		–		9	–	1	–	0
Virginia		–		7	–	1	–	0
North Carolina A&M		–		6	–	1	–	0
VPI		–		6	–	1	–	0
Florida		–		6	–	1	–	1
Elon		–		4	–	1	–	0
Louisiana Industrial		–		4	–	1	–	0
Spring Hill		–		4	–	1	–	0
Catholic University		–		0	–	1	–	1
North Carolina		–		5	–	2	–	0
Birmingham		–		4	–	2	–	0
Kendall		–		2	–	1	–	0
Southwestern Louisiana Industrial		–		5	–	2	–	2
Marshall		–		3	–	2	–	1
VMI		–		4	–	3	–	0
Navy		–		4	–	3	–	1
Texas		–		4	–	3	–	1
Tulane		–		4	–	3	–	2
West Virginia		–		4	–	3	–	2
Washington and Lee		–		4	–	3	–	0
Oklahoma		–		6	–	4	–	0
Georgetown		–		3	–	2	–	1
Oklahoma A&M		–		5	–	3	–	0
Davidson		–		3	–	4	–	2
George Washington		–		3	–	4	–	1
Chattanooga		–		2	–	3	–	2
Wake Forest		–		2	–	4	–	0
Maryland		–		2	–	5	–	0
South Carolina		–		2	–	6	–	0
Delaware		–		1	–	6	–	1

The 1909 Marshall Thundering Herd football team represented Marshall College (now Marshall University) as an independent during the 1909 college football season. Marshall posted a 3–2–1 record, outscoring its opposition 107–95. Home games were played on a campus field called "Central Field" which is presently Campus Commons.

== Schedule ==
Date	Opponent	Site	Result
October 16	Charleston Athletic Club	Central Field; Huntington, WV	W 12–0
October 23	Portsmouth	Central Field; Huntington, WV	W 66–0
October 25	at West Virginia Wesleyan	Buckhannon, WV	L 6–25
November 6	at Marietta	Marietta, OH	L 0–70
November 14	Glenville	Central Field; Huntington, WV	T 0–0
November 25	Morris Harvey^{†}	Central Field; Huntington, WV	W 23–0
^{†}Homecoming
