= 1909 Davidson football team =

American college football season

1909 Davidson football
- Conference: Independent
- Record: 3–4–2
- Head coach: Floyd M. Simmons (1st season)
- Home stadium: Sprunt Athletic Field

1909 Southern college football independents records
	Conf.			Overall
Team	W	L	T	W		L		T
Arkansas		–		7	–	0	–	0
Texas A&M		–		7	–	0	–	1
Mississippi College		–		3	–	0	–	0
Stetson		–		3	–	0	–	1
Kentucky State		–		9	–	1	–	0
Virginia		–		7	–	1	–	0
North Carolina A&M		–		6	–	1	–	0
VPI		–		6	–	1	–	0
Florida		–		6	–	1	–	1
Elon		–		4	–	1	–	0
Louisiana Industrial		–		4	–	1	–	0
Spring Hill		–		4	–	1	–	0
Catholic University		–		0	–	1	–	1
North Carolina		–		5	–	2	–	0
Birmingham		–		4	–	2	–	0
Kendall		–		2	–	1	–	0
Southwestern Louisiana Industrial		–		5	–	2	–	2
Marshall		–		3	–	2	–	1
VMI		–		4	–	3	–	0
Navy		–		4	–	3	–	1
Texas		–		4	–	3	–	1
Tulane		–		4	–	3	–	2
West Virginia		–		4	–	3	–	2
Washington and Lee		–		4	–	3	–	0
Oklahoma		–		6	–	4	–	0
Georgetown		–		3	–	2	–	1
Oklahoma A&M		–		5	–	3	–	0
Davidson		–		3	–	4	–	2
George Washington		–		3	–	4	–	1
Chattanooga		–		2	–	3	–	2
Wake Forest		–		2	–	4	–	0
Maryland		–		2	–	5	–	0
South Carolina		–		2	–	6	–	0
Delaware		–		1	–	6	–	1

The 1909 Davidson football team was an American football team that represented the Davidson College as an independent during the 1909 college football season. In their first year under head coach Floyd M. Simmons, the team compiled a 3–4–2 record.

== Schedule ==
Date	Opponent	Site	Result	Source
September 25	North Carolina Medical College	Sprunt Athletic Field; Davidson, NC	W 10–0	
October 1	at Virginia	Madison Hall Field; Charlottesville, VA	L 0–11	
October 9	vs. Clemson	Latta Park; Charlotte, NC	L 5–17	
October 15	at Georgia	Herty Field; Athens, GA	T 0–0	
October 22	vs. Washington and Lee	Fair Grounds; Roanoke, VA	L 6–18	
November 3	vs. The Citadel	State Fairgrounds; Columbia, SC	T 0–0	
November 13	South Carolina	Sprunt Athletic Field; Davidson, NC	W 29–5	
November 20	at Navy	Worden Field; Annapolis, MD	L 6–45	
November 25	vs. VMI	Fairgrounds; Lynchburg, VA	W 8–0	
