= William Newman (American football) =

American football player and coach

Biographical details
- Born: c. 1882
- Died: July 11, 1964 (aged 82)

Playing career
- 1904–1906: Cornell
- Position: Center

Coaching career (HC unless noted)
- 1907: Carlisle (line)
- 1908–1909: Georgetown
- 1913: Cornell (assistant)

Head coaching record
- Overall: 5–6–2

Accomplishments and honors

Awards
- Consensus All-American (1906)

William S. "Dusty" Newman (c. 1882 – July 11, 1964) was an American college football player and coach. He was a first-team All-American center for Cornell University in 1906. He later coached football at the Carlisle Indian Industrial School as an assistant to Pop Warner in 1907 and at Georgetown University as the school's head coach from 1908 to 1909.

== Playing career ==
Newman played at the center position for Cornell University from 1904 to 1906. He was selected as a first-team All-American by Caspar Whitney in 1906. Newman played for the Cornell football team during all three years in which Glenn "Pop" Warner was the head coach. Newman also rowed in the bow seat on Cornell's varsity crews from 1906 to 1907 that won Intercollegiate Rowing Association championships. In 1927, Newman was selected as the second-team center on Cornell's all-time football team. In supporting the selection, the New York Sun wrote: "Although Bill Newman never weighed 170 pounds, he had the reputation of being the strongest man physically who ever attended Cornell. ... Although he attained his greatest fame as an oarsman, Newman was a bull on the gridiron with a punishing drive that carried opponents back to China." For his contributions to championship teams in both football and rowing, Newman was tapped for the Quill and Dagger society and the Cornell Alumni News in 1933 called him "one of Cornell's all time athletic heroes."

== Coaching career ==
Newman graduated from Cornell in 1907. That fall, Warner took over as the head football coach of the Carlisle Indian Industrial School. Warner hired Newman as his line coach at Carlisle. Newman was an assistant coach at Carlisle in 1907. Newman later served as head coach at Georgetown in 1908 and 1909. Newman was inducted into the Cornell University Hall of Fame in 1978. In 1913, Newman returned to Cornell as an assistant football coach.

== Late life and death ==
Newman was a veterinarian and worked for the Bureau of Animal Husbandry. He spent time in the Western United States treating American bison in Yellowstone National Park. Newman was reassigned in 1924 to New York State, where he worked on the eradication of tuberculosis in animals. Newman was found dead at his home of a self-inflicted gunshot, on July 12, 1964. He was estimated to have died the previous evening.

== Head coaching record ==
Year	Team	Overall	Conference	Standing	Bowl/playoffs
Georgetown Blue and Gray (Independent) (1908–1909)
1908	Georgetown	2–4–1			
1909	Georgetown	3–2–1			
Georgetown:		5–6–2			
Total:		5–6–2			
