= 1909 Southwestern Louisiana Industrial football team =

American college football season

1909 Southwestern Louisiana Industrial football
- Conference: Independent
- Record: 5–2–2
- Head coach: Clement J. McNaspy (2nd season)
- Home stadium: Campus Athletic Field

1909 Southern college football independents records
	Conf.			Overall
Team	W	L	T	W		L		T
Arkansas		–		7	–	0	–	0
Texas A&M		–		7	–	0	–	1
Mississippi College		–		3	–	0	–	0
Stetson		–		3	–	0	–	1
Kentucky State		–		9	–	1	–	0
Virginia		–		7	–	1	–	0
North Carolina A&M		–		6	–	1	–	0
VPI		–		6	–	1	–	0
Florida		–		6	–	1	–	1
Elon		–		4	–	1	–	0
Louisiana Industrial		–		4	–	1	–	0
Spring Hill		–		4	–	1	–	0
Catholic University		–		0	–	1	–	1
North Carolina		–		5	–	2	–	0
Birmingham		–		4	–	2	–	0
Kendall		–		2	–	1	–	0
Southwestern Louisiana Industrial		–		5	–	2	–	2
Marshall		–		3	–	2	–	1
VMI		–		4	–	3	–	0
Navy		–		4	–	3	–	1
Texas		–		4	–	3	–	1
Tulane		–		4	–	3	–	2
West Virginia		–		4	–	3	–	2
Washington and Lee		–		4	–	3	–	0
Oklahoma		–		6	–	4	–	0
Georgetown		–		3	–	2	–	1
Oklahoma A&M		–		5	–	3	–	0
Davidson		–		3	–	4	–	2
George Washington		–		3	–	4	–	1
Chattanooga		–		2	–	3	–	2
Wake Forest		–		2	–	4	–	0
Maryland		–		2	–	5	–	0
South Carolina		–		2	–	6	–	0
Delaware		–		1	–	6	–	1

The 1909 Southwestern Louisiana Industrial football team was an American football team that represented the Southwestern Louisiana Industrial Institute (now known as the University of Louisiana at Lafayette) as an independent during the 1909 college football season. In their second year under head coach Clement J. McNaspy, the team compiled a 5–2–2 record.

== Schedule ==
Date	Opponent	Site	Result	Source
	at St. Martinville		T 0–0	
	St. Martinville		W 17–0	
	Crowley		W 36–2	
	Lake Arthur		W 36–0	
November 6	Abbeville		W 62–0	
November 13	at Abbeville		W 49–0	
	Lake Charles		T 5–5	
November 25	at Louisiana Normal	Natchitoches, LA	L 0–46	
December 11	Louisiana Normal	Lafayette, LA	L 0–11	
