= A. T. Myers =

American football coach

Coaching career (HC unless noted)
- 1909: Wake Forest

Head coaching record
- Overall: 2–4

A. T. Myers was an American college football coach. He served as the head football coach at Wake Forest University for one season in 1909, compiling a record of 2–4. He was an alumnus of Harvard University; reports differ on exactly where and when he played. Most sources claimed he played as an end (sometimes more specifically the right end) during the 1907 season, however others wrote that he played a combination of tackle and fullback from 1901 to 1905 for the Crimson, and spent the 1906 season coaching the Harvard freshman team.

== Head coaching record ==
Year	Team	Overall	Conference	Standing	Bowl/playoffs
Wake Forest Baptists (Independent) (1909)
1909	Wake Forest	2–4			
Wake Forest:		2–4			
Total:		2–4			
