= 1909 Oklahoma Sooners football team =

American college football season

1909 Oklahoma Sooners football
- Conference: Independent
- Record: 6–4
- Head coach: Bennie Owen (5th season)
- Captain: Charlie Armstrong
- Home stadium: Boyd Field

1909 Southern college football independents records
	Conf.			Overall
Team	W	L	T	W		L		T
Arkansas		–		7	–	0	–	0
Texas A&M		–		7	–	0	–	1
Mississippi College		–		3	–	0	–	0
Stetson		–		3	–	0	–	1
Kentucky State		–		9	–	1	–	0
Virginia		–		7	–	1	–	0
North Carolina A&M		–		6	–	1	–	0
VPI		–		6	–	1	–	0
Florida		–		6	–	1	–	1
Elon		–		4	–	1	–	0
Louisiana Industrial		–		4	–	1	–	0
Spring Hill		–		4	–	1	–	0
Catholic University		–		0	–	1	–	1
North Carolina		–		5	–	2	–	0
Birmingham		–		4	–	2	–	0
Kendall		–		2	–	1	–	0
Southwestern Louisiana Industrial		–		5	–	2	–	2
Marshall		–		3	–	2	–	1
VMI		–		4	–	3	–	0
Navy		–		4	–	3	–	1
Texas		–		4	–	3	–	1
Tulane		–		4	–	3	–	2
West Virginia		–		4	–	3	–	2
Washington and Lee		–		4	–	3	–	0
Oklahoma		–		6	–	4	–	0
Georgetown		–		3	–	2	–	1
Oklahoma A&M		–		5	–	3	–	0
Davidson		–		3	–	4	–	2
George Washington		–		3	–	4	–	1
Chattanooga		–		2	–	3	–	2
Wake Forest		–		2	–	4	–	0
Maryland		–		2	–	5	–	0
South Carolina		–		2	–	6	–	0
Delaware		–		1	–	6	–	1

The 1909 Oklahoma Sooners football team represented the University of Oklahoma as an independent during the 1909 college football season. In their fifth year under head coach Bennie Owen, the Sooners compiled a 6–4 record, and outscored their opponents by a combined total of 203 to 107.

== Schedule ==
Date	Opponent	Site	Result	Attendance	Source
September 23	Central State Normal	Boyd Field; Norman, OK	W 55–0		
October 2	Kingfisher	Boyd Field; Norman, OK	W 46–5		
October 9	at Kansas	McCook Field; Lawrence, KS	L 0–11	1,200	
October 13	Northwestern Oklahoma State	Boyd Field; Norman, OK	W 23–2		
October 30	at Arkansas	The Hill; Fayetteville, AR	L 6–21		
November 5	Washburn	Boyd Field; Norman, OK	W 42–8		
November 13	at Saint Louis	League Park; St. Louis, MO	W 11–5	2,500	
November 17	vs. Texas A&M	Gaston Park; Dallas, TX	L 5–14	1,200	
November 19	at Texas	Clark Field; Austin, TX (rivalry)	L 0–30		
November 29	at Epworth	Delmar Field; Oklahoma City, OK	W 12–11		
