= 1909 Kendall Orange and Black football team =

American college football season

1909 Kendall Orange and Black football
- Conference: Independent
- Record: 2–1
- Home stadium: Harwell Field

1909 Southern college football independents records
| | Conf. | | | Overall |
| Team | W | L | T | W | | L | | T |
|---|---|---|---|---|---|---|---|---|
| Arkansas | | – | | 7 | – | 0 | – | 0 |
| Texas A&M | | – | | 7 | – | 0 | – | 1 |
| Mississippi College | | – | | 3 | – | 0 | – | 0 |
| Stetson | | – | | 3 | – | 0 | – | 1 |
| Kentucky State | | – | | 9 | – | 1 | – | 0 |
| Virginia | | – | | 7 | – | 1 | – | 0 |
| North Carolina A&M | | – | | 6 | – | 1 | – | 0 |
| VPI | | – | | 6 | – | 1 | – | 0 |
| Florida | | – | | 6 | – | 1 | – | 1 |
| Elon | | – | | 4 | – | 1 | – | 0 |
| Louisiana Industrial | | – | | 4 | – | 1 | – | 0 |
| Spring Hill | | – | | 4 | – | 1 | – | 0 |
| Catholic University | | – | | 0 | – | 1 | – | 1 |
| North Carolina | | – | | 5 | – | 2 | – | 0 |
| Birmingham | | – | | 4 | – | 2 | – | 0 |
| Kendall | | – | | 2 | – | 1 | – | 0 |
| Southwestern Louisiana Industrial | | – | | 5 | – | 2 | – | 2 |
| Marshall | | – | | 3 | – | 2 | – | 1 |
| VMI | | – | | 4 | – | 3 | – | 0 |
| Navy | | – | | 4 | – | 3 | – | 1 |
| Texas | | – | | 4 | – | 3 | – | 1 |
| Tulane | | – | | 4 | – | 3 | – | 2 |
| West Virginia | | – | | 4 | – | 3 | – | 2 |
| Washington and Lee | | – | | 4 | – | 3 | – | 0 |
| Oklahoma | | – | | 6 | – | 4 | – | 0 |
| Georgetown | | – | | 3 | – | 2 | – | 1 |
| Oklahoma A&M | | – | | 5 | – | 3 | – | 0 |
| Davidson | | – | | 3 | – | 4 | – | 2 |
| George Washington | | – | | 3 | – | 4 | – | 1 |
| Chattanooga | | – | | 2 | – | 3 | – | 2 |
| Wake Forest | | – | | 2 | – | 4 | – | 0 |
| Maryland | | – | | 2 | – | 5 | – | 0 |
| South Carolina | | – | | 2 | – | 6 | – | 0 |
| Delaware | | – | | 1 | – | 6 | – | 1 |

The 1909 Kendall Orange and Black football team represented Henry Kendall College (later renamed the University of Tulsa) during the 1909 college football season. The team compiled a 2–1 record and was outscored by its opponents by a total of 33 to 23. The team played only one intercollegiate football game, a 22-6 loss to Northeastern State. Its two victories came in games against Claremore High School.

== Schedule ==
| Date | Opponent | Site | Result |
|---|---|---|---|
| October 8 | at Northeastern State | Tahlequah, OK | L 6–22 |
| October 11 | at Claremore High School | Claremore, OK | W 1–0 (forfeit) |
| October 30 | Claremore High School | Harwell Field; Tulsa, OK | W 16–11 |
