= 1909 Florida football team =

American college football season

1909 Florida football
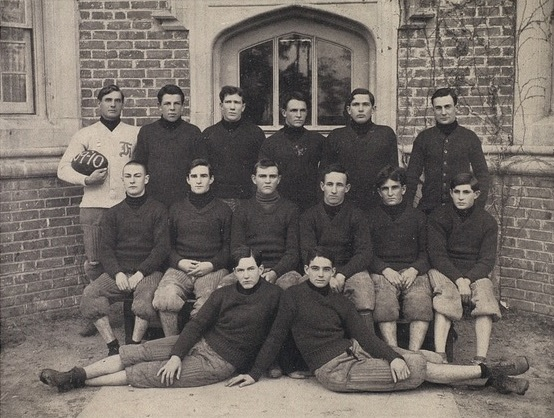
- Conference: Independent
- Record: 6–1–1
- Head coach: George E. Pyle (1st season)
- Captain: Ralph Rader
- Home stadium: The Ballpark

1909 Southern college football independents records
	Conf.			Overall
Team	W	L	T	W		L		T
Arkansas		–		7	–	0	–	0
Texas A&M		–		7	–	0	–	1
Mississippi College		–		3	–	0	–	0
Stetson		–		3	–	0	–	1
Kentucky State		–		9	–	1	–	0
Virginia		–		7	–	1	–	0
North Carolina A&M		–		6	–	1	–	0
VPI		–		6	–	1	–	0
Florida		–		6	–	1	–	1
Elon		–		4	–	1	–	0
Louisiana Industrial		–		4	–	1	–	0
Spring Hill		–		4	–	1	–	0
Catholic University		–		0	–	1	–	1
North Carolina		–		5	–	2	–	0
Birmingham		–		4	–	2	–	0
Kendall		–		2	–	1	–	0
Southwestern Louisiana Industrial		–		5	–	2	–	2
Marshall		–		3	–	2	–	1
VMI		–		4	–	3	–	0
Navy		–		4	–	3	–	1
Texas		–		4	–	3	–	1
Tulane		–		4	–	3	–	2
West Virginia		–		4	–	3	–	2
Washington and Lee		–		4	–	3	–	0
Oklahoma		–		6	–	4	–	0
Georgetown		–		3	–	2	–	1
Oklahoma A&M		–		5	–	3	–	0
Davidson		–		3	–	4	–	2
George Washington		–		3	–	4	–	1
Chattanooga		–		2	–	3	–	2
Wake Forest		–		2	–	4	–	0
Maryland		–		2	–	5	–	0
South Carolina		–		2	–	6	–	0
Delaware		–		1	–	6	–	1

The 1909 Florida football team represented the University of Florida during the 1909 college football season. The University of the State of Florida officially shortened its name to the University of Florida in 1909, and the season was George E. Pyle's first as the head coach of the University of Florida football team. Pyle's 1909 Florida football team finished its fourth varsity football season 6–1–1.

== Schedule ==
Date	Time	Opponent	Site	Result
October 8		Gainesville Athletic Club	The Ballpark; Gainesville, FL	W 5–0
October 23		at Olympics	Jacksonville, FL	W 9–0
October 30		Rollins	The Ballpark; Gainesville, FL	W 14–0
November 6	3:00 p. m.	at Stetson	DeLand, FL	L 0–26
November 15		at Rollins	Orlando, FL	W 28–3
November 20		Olympics	The Ballpark; Gainesville, FL	W 11–0
November 24		Stetson	The Ballpark; Gainesville, FL	T 5–5
November 28		Tallahassee Athletic Club	The Ballpark; Gainesville, FL	W 24–0

== Game summaries ==
=== Gainesville A. C. ===
The season opened with a 5–0 defeat of the Gainesville Athletic Club.

=== At Olympics ===
Team	1	2	Total
• Florida	3	6	9
Olympics	0	0	0

- Location: Jacksonville, FL
- Sources

In the second week of play, Dummy Taylor kicked three field goals to beat the Olympics 9–0 in Jacksonville.

The starting lineup was Moody (left end), Wagner (left tackle), McMillian (left guard), Storter (center), Cox (right guard), Rader (right tackle), Johnston (right en), Pile (quarterback), Shands (left halfback), Taylor (right halfback), Vidal (fullback).

=== Rollins ===
Florida also defeated the Rollins Tars twice. In the first game in Gainesville, Florida beat Rollins 14–0 in a contest described as "fast and furious". Taylor hit McCormick on a 20-yard pass, and scored every point.

The starting lineup was Moody (left end), Wagner (left tackle), Skipper (left guard), Storter (center), Cox (right guard), Rader (right tackle), McCormick (right end), Edgerton (quarterback), Shands (left halfback), Taylor (right halfback), Vidal (fullback).

=== Stetson ===
Team	1	2	Total
Florida	0	0	0
• Stetson	12	14	26

- Location: DeLand, FL
- Game start: 3:00 p. m.
- Referee: E. W. Palmer
- Sources

The 1909 Florida football team played the Stetson Hatters twice in the same season for the second year, first losing 0–26 on the Hatters' home field in DeLand, Florida.

The starting lineup was Moody (left end), Wagner (left tackle), McMillan (left guard), Baker (center), Cox (right guard), Rader (right tackle), Johnstone (right end), Edgerton (quarterback), Shands (left halfback), Taylor (right halfback), Vidal (fullback).

=== Rollins ===
Team	1	2	Total
• Florida	11	17	28
Rollins	3	0	3

- Location: Orlando, FL
- Sources

In a second game in Orlando, Florida beat Rollins 28–3. Florida fumbled the kickoff and Rollins made a field goal. Taylor ran 45 and 75 yards for touchdowns in the first half. In the second half, Taylor had another 60-yard run. Edgerton had a 30-yard run and McCormick one of 80 yards. The game was called early due to darkness.

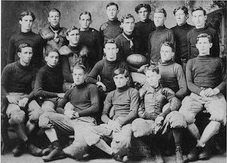

=== Olympics ===
The Gators met the Olympics at home again and beat them 11–0. Under favorable weather, Taylor and Moody scored touchdowns for Florida.

The starting lineup was Moody (left end), Wagner (left tackle), McMillan (left guard), Storter (center), Cox (right guard), Rader (right tackle), McCormick (right end), Edgerton (quarterback), Shands (left halfback), Taylor (right halfback), Vidal (fullback).

=== Stetson ===
Team	1	2	Total
Stetson	0	5	5
Florida	5	0	5

- Location: Gainesville, FL
- Game attendance: 1,000
- Sources

Stetson was also tied 5–5 on the Orange and Blue's home field in Gainesville. 1909 is the last season in which Stetson claims a state championship. About 200 Stetson fans came to Gainesville.

The starting lineup was Moody (left end), Waggoner (left tackle), Tenny (left guard), Storter (center), Cox (right guard), Rader (right tackle), Woolery (right end), Edgerton (quarterback), Bartleson (left halfback), Taylor (right halfback), Vidal (fullback).

=== Tallahassee A. C. ===
In the season's final game, the Tallahassee Athletic Club was beaten 24–0.

== Bibliography ==
- Carlson, Norm (2007). University of Florida Football Vault: The History of the Florida Gators. Atlanta, Georgia: Whitman Publishing, LLC. ISBN 0-7948-2298-3.
