= 1909 South Carolina Gamecocks football team =

American college football season

1909 South Carolina Gamecocks football
- Conference: Independent
- Record: 2–6
- Head coach: Christie Benet (4th season)
- Captain: J. H. Hammond
- Home stadium: Davis Field

1909 Southern college football independents records
	Conf.			Overall
Team	W	L	T	W		L		T
Arkansas		–		7	–	0	–	0
Texas A&M		–		7	–	0	–	1
Mississippi College		–		3	–	0	–	0
Stetson		–		3	–	0	–	1
Kentucky State		–		9	–	1	–	0
Virginia		–		7	–	1	–	0
North Carolina A&M		–		6	–	1	–	0
VPI		–		6	–	1	–	0
Florida		–		6	–	1	–	1
Elon		–		4	–	1	–	0
Louisiana Industrial		–		4	–	1	–	0
Spring Hill		–		4	–	1	–	0
Catholic University		–		0	–	1	–	1
North Carolina		–		5	–	2	–	0
Birmingham		–		4	–	2	–	0
Kendall		–		2	–	1	–	0
Southwestern Louisiana Industrial		–		5	–	2	–	2
Marshall		–		3	–	2	–	1
VMI		–		4	–	3	–	0
Navy		–		4	–	3	–	1
Texas		–		4	–	3	–	1
Tulane		–		4	–	3	–	2
West Virginia		–		4	–	3	–	2
Washington and Lee		–		4	–	3	–	0
Oklahoma		–		6	–	4	–	0
Georgetown		–		3	–	2	–	1
Oklahoma A&M		–		5	–	3	–	0
Davidson		–		3	–	4	–	2
George Washington		–		3	–	4	–	1
Chattanooga		–		2	–	3	–	2
Wake Forest		–		2	–	4	–	0
Maryland		–		2	–	5	–	0
South Carolina		–		2	–	6	–	0
Delaware		–		1	–	6	–	1

The 1909 South Carolina Gamecocks football team represented the University of South Carolina as an independent during the 1909 college football season. Led by Christie Benet in his fourth and final season as head coach, South Carolina compiled a record of 2–6.

== Schedule ==
Date	Opponent	Site	Result	Attendance	Source
October 9	North Carolina Medical College	Davis Field; Columbia, SC	L 0–5		
October 16	at Georgia Tech	Ponce de Leon Park; Atlanta, GA	L 0–59		
October 23	Wake Forest	Davis Field; Columbia, SC	L 0–8		
October 28	College of Charleston	Davis Field; Columbia, SC	W 17–11	500	
November 4	Clemson	Fairgrounds; Columbia, SC	L 0–6		
November 13	at Davidson	Davidson Athletic Field; Davidson, NC	L 5–29		
November 20	at Mercer	Macon, GA	L 3–5		
November 25	at The Citadel	College Park; Charleston, SC	W 11–5	1,600	
