= 1909 West Virginia Mountaineers football team =

American college football season

1909 West Virginia Mountaineers football
- Conference: Independent
- Record: 4–3–2
- Head coach: Charles Augustus Lueder (2nd season)
- Captain: Lee Hutchinson

1909 Southern college football independents records
	Conf.			Overall
Team	W	L	T	W		L		T
Arkansas		–		7	–	0	–	0
Texas A&M		–		7	–	0	–	1
Mississippi College		–		3	–	0	–	0
Stetson		–		3	–	0	–	1
Kentucky State		–		9	–	1	–	0
Virginia		–		7	–	1	–	0
North Carolina A&M		–		6	–	1	–	0
VPI		–		6	–	1	–	0
Florida		–		6	–	1	–	1
Elon		–		4	–	1	–	0
Louisiana Industrial		–		4	–	1	–	0
Spring Hill		–		4	–	1	–	0
Catholic University		–		0	–	1	–	1
North Carolina		–		5	–	2	–	0
Birmingham		–		4	–	2	–	0
Kendall		–		2	–	1	–	0
Southwestern Louisiana Industrial		–		5	–	2	–	2
Marshall		–		3	–	2	–	1
VMI		–		4	–	3	–	0
Navy		–		4	–	3	–	1
Texas		–		4	–	3	–	1
Tulane		–		4	–	3	–	2
West Virginia		–		4	–	3	–	2
Washington and Lee		–		4	–	3	–	0
Oklahoma		–		6	–	4	–	0
Georgetown		–		3	–	2	–	1
Oklahoma A&M		–		5	–	3	–	0
Davidson		–		3	–	4	–	2
George Washington		–		3	–	4	–	1
Chattanooga		–		2	–	3	–	2
Wake Forest		–		2	–	4	–	0
Maryland		–		2	–	5	–	0
South Carolina		–		2	–	6	–	0
Delaware		–		1	–	6	–	1

The 1909 West Virginia Mountaineers football team was an American football team that represented West Virginia University as an independent during the 1909 college football season. In its second season under head coach Charles Augustus Lueder, the team compiled a 4–3–2 record and outscored opponents by a total of 118 to 81. Lee Hutchinson was the team captain.

== Schedule ==
Date	Opponent	Site	Result	Attendance	Source
October 2	Waynesburg	Morgantown, WV	W 15–0		
October 9	at Penn	Philadelphia, PA	L 0–12		
October 16	Slippery Rock	Morgantown, WV	W 40–5		
October 23	Bucknell	Morgantown, WV	T 6–6		
October 30	vs. Marietta	Parkersburg, WV	W 3–0		
November 6	Pittsburgh	Morgantown, WV (rivalry)	T 0–0	3,000	
November 13	at Penn State	State College, PA (rivalry)	L 0–40		
November 17	West Virginia Wesleyan	Morgantown, WV	W 49–0		
November 25	Washington & Jefferson	Morgantown, WV	L 5–18	6,000	
