= 1909 Louisiana Industrial football team =

American college football season

1909 Louisiana Industrial football
- Conference: Independent
- Record: 4–1
- Head coach: Percy S. Prince (1st season)
- Captain: Walter Barr

1909 Southern college football independents records
	Conf.			Overall
Team	W	L	T	W		L		T
Arkansas		–		7	–	0	–	0
Texas A&M		–		7	–	0	–	1
Mississippi College		–		3	–	0	–	0
Stetson		–		3	–	0	–	1
Kentucky State		–		9	–	1	–	0
Virginia		–		7	–	1	–	0
North Carolina A&M		–		6	–	1	–	0
VPI		–		6	–	1	–	0
Florida		–		6	–	1	–	1
Elon		–		4	–	1	–	0
Louisiana Industrial		–		4	–	1	–	0
Spring Hill		–		4	–	1	–	0
Catholic University		–		0	–	1	–	1
North Carolina		–		5	–	2	–	0
Birmingham		–		4	–	2	–	0
Kendall		–		2	–	1	–	0
Southwestern Louisiana Industrial		–		5	–	2	–	2
Marshall		–		3	–	2	–	1
VMI		–		4	–	3	–	0
Navy		–		4	–	3	–	1
Texas		–		4	–	3	–	1
Tulane		–		4	–	3	–	2
West Virginia		–		4	–	3	–	2
Washington and Lee		–		4	–	3	–	0
Oklahoma		–		6	–	4	–	0
Georgetown		–		3	–	2	–	1
Oklahoma A&M		–		5	–	3	–	0
Davidson		–		3	–	4	–	2
George Washington		–		3	–	4	–	1
Chattanooga		–		2	–	3	–	2
Wake Forest		–		2	–	4	–	0
Maryland		–		2	–	5	–	0
South Carolina		–		2	–	6	–	0
Delaware		–		1	–	6	–	1

The 1909 Louisiana Industrial football team was an American football team that represented the Louisiana Industrial Institute—now known as Louisiana Tech University—as an independent during the 1909 college football season. Led by first-year head coach Percy S. Prince, Louisiana Industrial compiled a record of 4–1. The team's captain was A. A. Smith.

== Schedule ==
Date	Time	Opponent	Site	Result	Attendance	Source
October 4	4:30 p.m.	Monroe Athletic Club	Ruston, LA	W 28–0		
October 16		Centenary	Ruston, LA	W 60–0		
November 4		vs. LSU	Alexandria, LA	L 0–23	1,200	
November 9		Henderson	Ruston, LA	W 3–0		
November 19		Louisiana Normal	Athletic Park; Ruston, LA (rivalry)	W 45–0		
All times are in Central time
