= Reddy Rowe =

American athlete and coach (1887–1966)

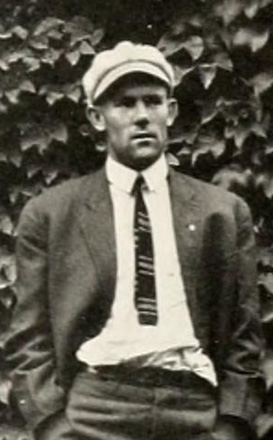
- Rowe pictured in The Howler 1911, Wake Forest yearbook

Biographical details
- Born: August 18, 1887; Plymouth, North Carolina, U.S.
- Died: May 27, 1966 (aged 78); Durham, North Carolina, U.S.

Playing career

Football
- 1909: Elon

Baseball
- 1909: Raleigh Red Birds
- 1910: Lynchburg Shoemakers
- 1911: Albany Senators
- 1912–1913: Ottawa Senators
- 1913: Brantford Red Sox
- 1915: Greensboro Patriots
- Position: Quarterback (football)

Coaching career (HC unless noted)

Football
- 1909: Elon
- 1910: Wake Forest

Baseball
- 1915: Greensboro Patriots

Head coaching record
- Overall: 6–8 (football)

William Harrison "Reddy" Rowe^{[n1]} (August 18, 1887 – May 27, 1966) was an American football and baseball player and coach. He served as the head football coach at Elon College—now known as Elon University—in 1909 and at Wake Forest University in 1910, compiling a career college football record of 6–8. Rowe was born on August 18, 1887, in Plymouth, North Carolina. He died on May 27, 1966, in Durham, North Carolina.

== Head coaching record ==
=== Football ===
Year	Team	Overall	Conference	Standing	Bowl/playoffs
Elon Fightin' Christians (Independent) (1909)
1909	Elon	4–1			
Elon:		4–1			
Wake Forest Baptists (Independent) (1910)
1910	Wake Forest	2–7			
Wake Forest:		2–7			
Total:		6–8			

== Notes ==
- ^[n1]Nickname also given as "Reddi", "Reddie" and "Red".
