= 1909 Oklahoma A&M Aggies football team =

American college football season

1909 Oklahoma A&M Aggies football
- Conference: Independent
- Record: 5–3
- Head coach: Paul J. Davis (1st season)

1909 Southern college football independents records
| | Conf. | | | Overall |
| Team | W | L | T | W | | L | | T |
|---|---|---|---|---|---|---|---|---|
| Arkansas | | – | | 7 | – | 0 | – | 0 |
| Texas A&M | | – | | 7 | – | 0 | – | 1 |
| Mississippi College | | – | | 3 | – | 0 | – | 0 |
| Stetson | | – | | 3 | – | 0 | – | 1 |
| Kentucky State | | – | | 9 | – | 1 | – | 0 |
| Virginia | | – | | 7 | – | 1 | – | 0 |
| North Carolina A&M | | – | | 6 | – | 1 | – | 0 |
| VPI | | – | | 6 | – | 1 | – | 0 |
| Florida | | – | | 6 | – | 1 | – | 1 |
| Elon | | – | | 4 | – | 1 | – | 0 |
| Louisiana Industrial | | – | | 4 | – | 1 | – | 0 |
| Spring Hill | | – | | 4 | – | 1 | – | 0 |
| Catholic University | | – | | 0 | – | 1 | – | 1 |
| North Carolina | | – | | 5 | – | 2 | – | 0 |
| Birmingham | | – | | 4 | – | 2 | – | 0 |
| Kendall | | – | | 2 | – | 1 | – | 0 |
| Southwestern Louisiana Industrial | | – | | 5 | – | 2 | – | 2 |
| Marshall | | – | | 3 | – | 2 | – | 1 |
| VMI | | – | | 4 | – | 3 | – | 0 |
| Navy | | – | | 4 | – | 3 | – | 1 |
| Texas | | – | | 4 | – | 3 | – | 1 |
| Tulane | | – | | 4 | – | 3 | – | 2 |
| West Virginia | | – | | 4 | – | 3 | – | 2 |
| Washington and Lee | | – | | 4 | – | 3 | – | 0 |
| Oklahoma | | – | | 6 | – | 4 | – | 0 |
| Georgetown | | – | | 3 | – | 2 | – | 1 |
| Oklahoma A&M | | – | | 5 | – | 3 | – | 0 |
| Davidson | | – | | 3 | – | 4 | – | 2 |
| George Washington | | – | | 3 | – | 4 | – | 1 |
| Chattanooga | | – | | 2 | – | 3 | – | 2 |
| Wake Forest | | – | | 2 | – | 4 | – | 0 |
| Maryland | | – | | 2 | – | 5 | – | 0 |
| South Carolina | | – | | 2 | – | 6 | – | 0 |
| Delaware | | – | | 1 | – | 6 | – | 1 |

The 1909 Oklahoma A&M Aggies football team represented Oklahoma A&M College in the 1909 college football season. This was the ninth year of football at A&M and the first under Paul J. Davis. The Aggies played their home games in Stillwater, Oklahoma. They finished the season 5–3.

== Schedule ==
| Date | Opponent | Site | Result |
|---|---|---|---|
| October 2 | Oklahoma City High School | Stillwater, OK | L 0–5 |
| October 15 | Phillips | Stillwater, OK | W 6–0 |
| October 22 | Kingfisher | Stillwater, OK | W 6–0 |
| October 29 | at Northwestern Normal | Alva, OK | W 5–0 |
| November 5 | at Southeastern State Normal | Durant, OK | W 6–0 |
| November 13 | at Kansas State | Manhattan, KS | L 0–9 |
| November 19 | Southwestern (KS) | Stillwater, OK | L 0–12 |
| November 24 | at Central State Normal | Edmond, OK | W 27–0 |
