= 1909 Chattanooga Moccasins football team =

American college football season

1909 Chattanooga Moccasins football
- Conference: Independent
- Record: 2–3–2
- Head coach: W. A. Roddick (1st season)
- Captain: Logan Morgan
- Home stadium: Chamberlain Field

1909 Southern college football independents records
	Conf.			Overall
Team	W	L	T	W		L		T
Arkansas		–		7	–	0	–	0
Texas A&M		–		7	–	0	–	1
Mississippi College		–		3	–	0	–	0
Stetson		–		3	–	0	–	1
Kentucky State		–		9	–	1	–	0
Virginia		–		7	–	1	–	0
North Carolina A&M		–		6	–	1	–	0
VPI		–		6	–	1	–	0
Florida		–		6	–	1	–	1
Elon		–		4	–	1	–	0
Louisiana Industrial		–		4	–	1	–	0
Spring Hill		–		4	–	1	–	0
Catholic University		–		0	–	1	–	1
North Carolina		–		5	–	2	–	0
Birmingham		–		4	–	2	–	0
Kendall		–		2	–	1	–	0
Southwestern Louisiana Industrial		–		5	–	2	–	2
Marshall		–		3	–	2	–	1
VMI		–		4	–	3	–	0
Navy		–		4	–	3	–	1
Texas		–		4	–	3	–	1
Tulane		–		4	–	3	–	2
West Virginia		–		4	–	3	–	2
Washington and Lee		–		4	–	3	–	0
Oklahoma		–		6	–	4	–	0
Georgetown		–		3	–	2	–	1
Oklahoma A&M		–		5	–	3	–	0
Davidson		–		3	–	4	–	2
George Washington		–		3	–	4	–	1
Chattanooga		–		2	–	3	–	2
Wake Forest		–		2	–	4	–	0
Maryland		–		2	–	5	–	0
South Carolina		–		2	–	6	–	0
Delaware		–		1	–	6	–	1

The 1909 Chattanooga Moccasins football team represented the University of Chattanooga as an independent during the 1909 college football season.

== Schedule ==
Date	Opponent	Site	Result	Source
October 16	Athens	Chamberlain Field; Chattanooga, TN	W 6–5	
October 23	11th Cavalry	Chamberlain Field; Chattanooga, TN	L 0–5	
October 31	Howard (AL)	Chamberlain Field; Chattanooga, TN	T 0–0	
November 4	at Mercer	Central City Park; Macon, GA	L 2–10	
November 12	at Mississippi A&M	Hardy Field; Starkville, MS	L 6–38	
November 20	Tennessee	Chamberlain Field; Chattanooga, TN	T 0–0	
November 25	Maryville (TN)	Chamberlain Field; Chattanooga, TN	W 20–6	
