= 1909 Georgetown Blue and Gray football team =

American college football season

1909 Georgetown Blue and Gray football
- Conference: Independent
- Record: 3–2–1
- Head coach: William Newman (2nd season)
- Captain: Tom Stewart
- Home stadium: Georgetown Field

1909 Southern college football independents records
	Conf.			Overall
Team	W	L	T	W		L		T
Arkansas		–		7	–	0	–	0
Texas A&M		–		7	–	0	–	1
Mississippi College		–		3	–	0	–	0
Stetson		–		3	–	0	–	1
Kentucky State		–		9	–	1	–	0
Virginia		–		7	–	1	–	0
North Carolina A&M		–		6	–	1	–	0
VPI		–		6	–	1	–	0
Florida		–		6	–	1	–	1
Elon		–		4	–	1	–	0
Louisiana Industrial		–		4	–	1	–	0
Spring Hill		–		4	–	1	–	0
Catholic University		–		0	–	1	–	1
North Carolina		–		5	–	2	–	0
Birmingham		–		4	–	2	–	0
Kendall		–		2	–	1	–	0
Southwestern Louisiana Industrial		–		5	–	2	–	2
Marshall		–		3	–	2	–	1
VMI		–		4	–	3	–	0
Navy		–		4	–	3	–	1
Texas		–		4	–	3	–	1
Tulane		–		4	–	3	–	2
West Virginia		–		4	–	3	–	2
Washington and Lee		–		4	–	3	–	0
Oklahoma		–		6	–	4	–	0
Georgetown		–		3	–	2	–	1
Oklahoma A&M		–		5	–	3	–	0
Davidson		–		3	–	4	–	2
George Washington		–		3	–	4	–	1
Chattanooga		–		2	–	3	–	2
Wake Forest		–		2	–	4	–	0
Maryland		–		2	–	5	–	0
South Carolina		–		2	–	6	–	0
Delaware		–		1	–	6	–	1

The 1909 Georgetown Blue and Gray football team represented Georgetown University during the 1909 college football season. Led by William Newman in his second year as head coach, the team went 3–2–1.

== Schedule ==
Date	Time	Opponent	Site	Result	Source
October 2		Gallaudet	Georgetown Field; Washington, DC	W 36–0	
October 9		Washington College	Georgetown Field; Washington, DC	W 6–5	
October 16		at Richmond	Broad Street Park; Richmond, VA	W 17–0	
October 23		North Carolina	Georgetown Field; Washington, DC	L 0–5	
November 2		at Fordham	American League Park; New York, NY	T 0–0	
November 13	2:30 p.m.	Virginia	Georgetown Field; Washington, DC	L 0–21	
