= 1909 Arkansas Razorbacks football team =

American college football season

1909 Arkansas Razorbacks football
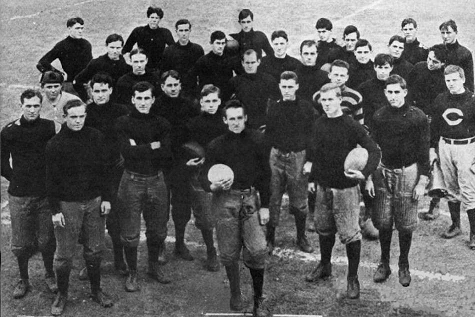
- 1909 Arkansas Razorbacks group photo
- Conference: Independent
- Record: 7–0
- Head coach: Hugo Bezdek (2nd season)
- Captain: Stanley Phillip
- Home stadium: The Hill

1909 Southern college football independents records
	Conf.			Overall
Team	W	L	T	W		L		T
Arkansas		–		7	–	0	–	0
Texas A&M		–		7	–	0	–	1
Mississippi College		–		3	–	0	–	0
Stetson		–		3	–	0	–	1
Kentucky State		–		9	–	1	–	0
Virginia		–		7	–	1	–	0
North Carolina A&M		–		6	–	1	–	0
VPI		–		6	–	1	–	0
Florida		–		6	–	1	–	1
Elon		–		4	–	1	–	0
Louisiana Industrial		–		4	–	1	–	0
Spring Hill		–		4	–	1	–	0
Catholic University		–		0	–	1	–	1
North Carolina		–		5	–	2	–	0
Birmingham		–		4	–	2	–	0
Kendall		–		2	–	1	–	0
Southwestern Louisiana Industrial		–		5	–	2	–	2
Marshall		–		3	–	2	–	1
VMI		–		4	–	3	–	0
Navy		–		4	–	3	–	1
Texas		–		4	–	3	–	1
Tulane		–		4	–	3	–	2
West Virginia		–		4	–	3	–	2
Washington and Lee		–		4	–	3	–	0
Oklahoma		–		6	–	4	–	0
Georgetown		–		3	–	2	–	1
Oklahoma A&M		–		5	–	3	–	0
Davidson		–		3	–	4	–	2
George Washington		–		3	–	4	–	1
Chattanooga		–		2	–	3	–	2
Wake Forest		–		2	–	4	–	0
Maryland		–		2	–	5	–	0
South Carolina		–		2	–	6	–	0
Delaware		–		1	–	6	–	1

The 1909 Arkansas Razorbacks football team represented the University of Arkansas during the 1909 college football season. In their second year under head coach Hugo Bezdek, Arkansas (whose mascot before 1910 was the Cardinals) compiled a 7–0 record, shut out four of seven opponents, and outscored all opponents by a combined total of 185 to 18.

Oklahoma disputes the score of a 21–6 Arkansas win on October 23, but the team achieved its first ever perfect season at 7–0.

After defeating LSU in Memphis on November 13, Bezdek gave an impromptu press conference at the Fayetteville train station after the team arrived, stating that his team had "played like a wild band of razorback hogs!". The University of Arkansas students loved the reference, and the nickname stuck. By the next school year, the student body voted to change the school mascot from Cardinals to Razorbacks.

Amos Alonzo Stagg traveled to Little Rock and refereed the Arkansas-Washington game on Thanksgiving Day.

Arkansas was considered the unofficial "Champions of the South" for 1909.

== Schedule ==
Date	Time	Opponent	Site	Result	Attendance	Source
October 2		Henderson	The Hill; Fayetteville, AR	W 24–0		
October 16		at Drury	Springfield, MO	W 12–6		
October 23		Fairmount	The Hill; Fayetteville, AR	W 23–6		
October 30		Oklahoma	The Hill; Fayetteville, AR	W 21–6		
November 13		vs. LSU	Red Elm Field; Memphis, TN (rivalry)	W 16–0		
November 15		at Ouachita	Arkadelphia, AR	W 55–0		
November 25	2:30 p.m.	Washington University	West End Park; Little Rock, AR	W 34–0	5,000	
