= 1909 Elon Fightin' Christians football team =

American college football season

1906 Elon Fightin' Christians football
- Conference: Independent
- Record: 4–1
- Head coach: Reddy Rowe (1st season)

1909 Southern college football independents records
	Conf.			Overall
Team	W	L	T	W		L		T
Arkansas		–		7	–	0	–	0
Texas A&M		–		7	–	0	–	1
Mississippi College		–		3	–	0	–	0
Stetson		–		3	–	0	–	1
Kentucky State		–		9	–	1	–	0
Virginia		–		7	–	1	–	0
North Carolina A&M		–		6	–	1	–	0
VPI		–		6	–	1	–	0
Florida		–		6	–	1	–	1
Elon		–		4	–	1	–	0
Louisiana Industrial		–		4	–	1	–	0
Spring Hill		–		4	–	1	–	0
Catholic University		–		0	–	1	–	1
North Carolina		–		5	–	2	–	0
Birmingham		–		4	–	2	–	0
Kendall		–		2	–	1	–	0
Southwestern Louisiana Industrial		–		5	–	2	–	2
Marshall		–		3	–	2	–	1
VMI		–		4	–	3	–	0
Navy		–		4	–	3	–	1
Texas		–		4	–	3	–	1
Tulane		–		4	–	3	–	2
West Virginia		–		4	–	3	–	2
Washington and Lee		–		4	–	3	–	0
Oklahoma		–		6	–	4	–	0
Georgetown		–		3	–	2	–	1
Oklahoma A&M		–		5	–	3	–	0
Davidson		–		3	–	4	–	2
George Washington		–		3	–	4	–	1
Chattanooga		–		2	–	3	–	2
Wake Forest		–		2	–	4	–	0
Maryland		–		2	–	5	–	0
South Carolina		–		2	–	6	–	0
Delaware		–		1	–	6	–	1

The 1909 Elon Fightin' Christians football team represented Elon College (now Elon University) in the 1909 college football season. In their inaugural season, the team was coached by Reddy Rowe, and outscored their opponents 62–23.

Elon would not field a team for the next nine years, returning to the field for the 1919 season.

== Schedule ==
Date	Opponent	Site	Result
October 23	Bingham Military	Elon, NC	W 11–6
October 30	High Point School	Elon, NC	W 5–0
November 6	at Bingham Military	Unknown	L 0–17
November 13	Reidsville Seminary	Elon, NC	W 40–0
November 26	Durham YMCA	Elon, NC	W 6–0
