= 1909 Texas A&M Aggies football team =

American college football season

1909 Texas A&M Aggies football

Southwest Champion
- Conference: Independent
- Record: 7–0–1
- Head coach: Charley Moran (1st season)
- Home stadium: Kyle Field

1909 Southern college football independents records
	Conf.			Overall
Team	W	L	T	W		L		T
Arkansas		–		7	–	0	–	0
Texas A&M		–		7	–	0	–	1
Mississippi College		–		3	–	0	–	0
Stetson		–		3	–	0	–	1
Kentucky State		–		9	–	1	–	0
Virginia		–		7	–	1	–	0
North Carolina A&M		–		6	–	1	–	0
VPI		–		6	–	1	–	0
Florida		–		6	–	1	–	1
Elon		–		4	–	1	–	0
Louisiana Industrial		–		4	–	1	–	0
Spring Hill		–		4	–	1	–	0
Catholic University		–		0	–	1	–	1
North Carolina		–		5	–	2	–	0
Birmingham		–		4	–	2	–	0
Kendall		–		2	–	1	–	0
Southwestern Louisiana Industrial		–		5	–	2	–	2
Marshall		–		3	–	2	–	1
VMI		–		4	–	3	–	0
Navy		–		4	–	3	–	1
Texas		–		4	–	3	–	1
Tulane		–		4	–	3	–	2
West Virginia		–		4	–	3	–	2
Washington and Lee		–		4	–	3	–	0
Oklahoma		–		6	–	4	–	0
Georgetown		–		3	–	2	–	1
Oklahoma A&M		–		5	–	3	–	0
Davidson		–		3	–	4	–	2
George Washington		–		3	–	4	–	1
Chattanooga		–		2	–	3	–	2
Wake Forest		–		2	–	4	–	0
Maryland		–		2	–	5	–	0
South Carolina		–		2	–	6	–	0
Delaware		–		1	–	6	–	1

The 1909 Texas A&M Aggies football team represented the Agricultural and Mechanical College of Texas—now known as Texas A&M University—as an independent during the 1909 college football season. Led by first-year head coach Charley Moran, the Aggies compiled a record of 7–0–1. Lob Brown and Frank Shipp were on the team.

== Schedule ==
Date	Opponent	Site	Result	Attendance	Source
October 2	Austin	Kyle Field; College Station, TX	W 17–0		
October 9	TCU	Kyle Field; College Station, TX (rivalry)	T 0–0		
October 23	Haskell	Kyle Field; College Station, TX	W 15–0		
October 30	at Baylor	Carroll Field; Waco, TX (rivalry)	W 9–6		
November 8	vs. Texas	West End Park; Houston, TX (rivalry)	W 23–0		
November 13	Holy Trinity	Kyle Field; College Station, TX	W 44–0		
November 17	vs. Oklahoma	Gaston Park; Dallas, TX	W 14–5	1,200	
November 25	at Texas	Clark Field; Austin, TX	W 5–0		
