= 1909 Texas Longhorns football team =

American college football season

1909 Texas Longhorns football
- Conference: Independent
- Record: 4–3–1
- Head coach: Dexter Draper (1st season)
- Captain: Ben Dyer
- Home stadium: Clark Field

1909 Southern college football independents records
| | Conf. | | | Overall |
| Team | W | L | T | W | | L | | T |
|---|---|---|---|---|---|---|---|---|
| Arkansas | | – | | 7 | – | 0 | – | 0 |
| Texas A&M | | – | | 7 | – | 0 | – | 1 |
| Mississippi College | | – | | 3 | – | 0 | – | 0 |
| Stetson | | – | | 3 | – | 0 | – | 1 |
| Kentucky State | | – | | 9 | – | 1 | – | 0 |
| Virginia | | – | | 7 | – | 1 | – | 0 |
| North Carolina A&M | | – | | 6 | – | 1 | – | 0 |
| VPI | | – | | 6 | – | 1 | – | 0 |
| Florida | | – | | 6 | – | 1 | – | 1 |
| Elon | | – | | 4 | – | 1 | – | 0 |
| Louisiana Industrial | | – | | 4 | – | 1 | – | 0 |
| Spring Hill | | – | | 4 | – | 1 | – | 0 |
| Catholic University | | – | | 0 | – | 1 | – | 1 |
| North Carolina | | – | | 5 | – | 2 | – | 0 |
| Birmingham | | – | | 4 | – | 2 | – | 0 |
| Kendall | | – | | 2 | – | 1 | – | 0 |
| Southwestern Louisiana Industrial | | – | | 5 | – | 2 | – | 2 |
| Marshall | | – | | 3 | – | 2 | – | 1 |
| VMI | | – | | 4 | – | 3 | – | 0 |
| Navy | | – | | 4 | – | 3 | – | 1 |
| Texas | | – | | 4 | – | 3 | – | 1 |
| Tulane | | – | | 4 | – | 3 | – | 2 |
| West Virginia | | – | | 4 | – | 3 | – | 2 |
| Washington and Lee | | – | | 4 | – | 3 | – | 0 |
| Oklahoma | | – | | 6 | – | 4 | – | 0 |
| Georgetown | | – | | 3 | – | 2 | – | 1 |
| Oklahoma A&M | | – | | 5 | – | 3 | – | 0 |
| Davidson | | – | | 3 | – | 4 | – | 2 |
| George Washington | | – | | 3 | – | 4 | – | 1 |
| Chattanooga | | – | | 2 | – | 3 | – | 2 |
| Wake Forest | | – | | 2 | – | 4 | – | 0 |
| Maryland | | – | | 2 | – | 5 | – | 0 |
| South Carolina | | – | | 2 | – | 6 | – | 0 |
| Delaware | | – | | 1 | – | 6 | – | 1 |

The 1909 Texas Longhorns football team was an American football team that represented the University of Texas (now known as the University of Texas at Austin) as an independent during the 1909 college football season. In their first year under head coach Dexter Draper, the Longhorns compiled an overall record of 4–3–1.

== Schedule ==
| Date | Opponent | Site | Result | Source |
|---|---|---|---|---|
| October 9 | Southwestern (TX) | Clark Field; Austin, TX | W 12–0 | |
| October 16 | vs. Haskell | Gaston Park; Dallas, TX | L 11–12 | |
| October 23 | Trinity (TX) | Clark Field; Austin, TX | W 18–0 | |
| October 30 | TCU | Clark Field; Austin, TX (rivalry) | W 24–0 | |
| November 8 | vs. Texas A&M | West End Park; Houston, TX (rivalry) | L 0–23 | |
| November 13 | at Tulane | Tulane Stadium; New Orleans, LA | T 10–10 | |
| November 19 | Oklahoma | Clark Field; Austin, TX (rivalry) | W 30–0 | |
| November 25 | Texas A&M | Clark Field; Austin, TX | L 0–5 | |
