= 1909 Delaware football team =

American college football season

1909 Delaware football
- Conference: Independent
- Record: 1–6–1
- Head coach: William McAvoy (2nd season)

1909 Southern college football independents records
	Conf.			Overall
Team	W	L	T	W		L		T
Arkansas		–		7	–	0	–	0
Texas A&M		–		7	–	0	–	1
Mississippi College		–		3	–	0	–	0
Stetson		–		3	–	0	–	1
Kentucky State		–		9	–	1	–	0
Virginia		–		7	–	1	–	0
North Carolina A&M		–		6	–	1	–	0
VPI		–		6	–	1	–	0
Florida		–		6	–	1	–	1
Elon		–		4	–	1	–	0
Louisiana Industrial		–		4	–	1	–	0
Spring Hill		–		4	–	1	–	0
Catholic University		–		0	–	1	–	1
North Carolina		–		5	–	2	–	0
Birmingham		–		4	–	2	–	0
Kendall		–		2	–	1	–	0
Southwestern Louisiana Industrial		–		5	–	2	–	2
Marshall		–		3	–	2	–	1
VMI		–		4	–	3	–	0
Navy		–		4	–	3	–	1
Texas		–		4	–	3	–	1
Tulane		–		4	–	3	–	2
West Virginia		–		4	–	3	–	2
Washington and Lee		–		4	–	3	–	0
Oklahoma		–		6	–	4	–	0
Georgetown		–		3	–	2	–	1
Oklahoma A&M		–		5	–	3	–	0
Davidson		–		3	–	4	–	2
George Washington		–		3	–	4	–	1
Chattanooga		–		2	–	3	–	2
Wake Forest		–		2	–	4	–	0
Maryland		–		2	–	5	–	0
South Carolina		–		2	–	6	–	0
Delaware		–		1	–	6	–	1

The 1909 Delaware football team was an American football team that represented Delaware College (later renamed the University of Delaware) as an independent during the 1909 college football season. In its second year under head coach William McAvoy, the team compiled a 1–6–1 record.

== Schedule ==
Date	Opponent	Site	Result	Source
October 2	Williamson	Newark, DE	T 0–0	
October 9	at Haverford	Haverford, PA	L 0–3	
October 23	at Gettysburg	Gettysburg, PA	L 10–23	
October 30	at Swarthmore	Swarthmore, PA	L 0–46	
November 6	at Washington College	Chestertown, MD	L 0–34	
November 13	Western Maryland	Newark, DE	L 6–11	
November 20	at Franklin & Marshall	Lancaster, PA	L 0–23	
November 25	Lebanon Valley	Newark, DE	W 6–0	
