= 1909 Kentucky State College Blue and White football team =

American college football season

1909 Kentucky State College Blue and White football
- Conference: Kentucky Intercollegiate Athletic Association
- Record: 9–1 (5–0 KIAA)
- Head coach: Edwin Sweetland (1st season)
- Captain: Dick Barbee

1909 Southern college football independents records
	Conf.			Overall
Team	W	L	T	W		L		T
Arkansas		–		7	–	0	–	0
Texas A&M		–		7	–	0	–	1
Mississippi College		–		3	–	0	–	0
Stetson		–		3	–	0	–	1
Kentucky State		–		9	–	1	–	0
Virginia		–		7	–	1	–	0
North Carolina A&M		–		6	–	1	–	0
VPI		–		6	–	1	–	0
Florida		–		6	–	1	–	1
Elon		–		4	–	1	–	0
Louisiana Industrial		–		4	–	1	–	0
Spring Hill		–		4	–	1	–	0
Catholic University		–		0	–	1	–	1
North Carolina		–		5	–	2	–	0
Birmingham		–		4	–	2	–	0
Kendall		–		2	–	1	–	0
Southwestern Louisiana Industrial		–		5	–	2	–	2
Marshall		–		3	–	2	–	1
VMI		–		4	–	3	–	0
Navy		–		4	–	3	–	1
Texas		–		4	–	3	–	1
Tulane		–		4	–	3	–	2
West Virginia		–		4	–	3	–	2
Washington and Lee		–		4	–	3	–	0
Oklahoma		–		6	–	4	–	0
Georgetown		–		3	–	2	–	1
Oklahoma A&M		–		5	–	3	–	0
Davidson		–		3	–	4	–	2
George Washington		–		3	–	4	–	1
Chattanooga		–		2	–	3	–	2
Wake Forest		–		2	–	4	–	0
Maryland		–		2	–	5	–	0
South Carolina		–		2	–	6	–	0
Delaware		–		1	–	6	–	1

The 1909 Kentucky State College Blue and White football team represented Kentucky State College—now known as the University of Kentucky—during the 1909 college football season. When the Kentucky team was welcomed home after the upset win over Illinois, Philip Carbusier said that they had "fought like wildcats", a nickname that stuck.

== Schedule ==
Date	Opponent	Site	Result	Attendance	Source
September 25	Kentucky Wesleyan	Stoll Field; Lexington, KY	W 18–0		
October 2	Berea	Stoll Field; Lexington, KY	W 28–0		
October 9	at Illinois	Illinois Field; Champaign, IL	W 6–2		
October 16	Tennessee	Stoll Field; Lexington, KY (rivalry)	W 17–0	2,000	
October 21	at North Carolina A&M	Riddick Stadium; Raleigh, NC	L 6–15		
October 30	Rose Polytechnic	Stoll Field; Lexington, KY	W 43–0		
November 3	at Georgetown (KY)	Georgetown, KY	W 22–6		
November 6	St. Mary's (KY)	Stoll Field; Lexington, KY	W 29–0		
November 13	Transylvania	Stoll Field; Lexington, KY (rivalry)	W 77–0		
November 25	Central University	Stoll Field; Lexington, KY (rivalry)	W 15–6		
