= 1909 Navy Midshipmen football team =

American college football season

1909 Navy Midshipmen football
- Conference: Independent
- Record: 4–3–1
- Head coach: Frank Berrien (2nd season)
- Captain: George Meyer
- Home stadium: Worden Field

1909 Southern college football independents records
	Conf.			Overall
Team	W	L	T	W		L		T
Arkansas		–		7	–	0	–	0
Texas A&M		–		7	–	0	–	1
Mississippi College		–		3	–	0	–	0
Stetson		–		3	–	0	–	1
Kentucky State		–		9	–	1	–	0
Virginia		–		7	–	1	–	0
North Carolina A&M		–		6	–	1	–	0
VPI		–		6	–	1	–	0
Florida		–		6	–	1	–	1
Elon		–		4	–	1	–	0
Louisiana Industrial		–		4	–	1	–	0
Spring Hill		–		4	–	1	–	0
Catholic University		–		0	–	1	–	1
North Carolina		–		5	–	2	–	0
Birmingham		–		4	–	2	–	0
Kendall		–		2	–	1	–	0
Southwestern Louisiana Industrial		–		5	–	2	–	2
Marshall		–		3	–	2	–	1
VMI		–		4	–	3	–	0
Navy		–		4	–	3	–	1
Texas		–		4	–	3	–	1
Tulane		–		4	–	3	–	2
West Virginia		–		4	–	3	–	2
Washington and Lee		–		4	–	3	–	0
Oklahoma		–		6	–	4	–	0
Georgetown		–		3	–	2	–	1
Oklahoma A&M		–		5	–	3	–	0
Davidson		–		3	–	4	–	2
George Washington		–		3	–	4	–	1
Chattanooga		–		2	–	3	–	2
Wake Forest		–		2	–	4	–	0
Maryland		–		2	–	5	–	0
South Carolina		–		2	–	6	–	0
Delaware		–		1	–	6	–	1

The 1909 Navy Midshipmen football team represented the United States Naval Academy during the 1909 college football season. In their second season under Frank Berrien, the Midshipmen compiled a 4–3–1 record and outscored their opponents by a combined score of 99 to 42.

== Schedule ==
Date	Opponent	Site	Result	Source
October 6	St. John's (MD)	Worden Field; Annapolis, MD	W 16–6	
October 9	Rutgers	Worden Field; Annapolis, MD	W 12–3	
October 16	Villanova	Worden Field; Annapolis, MD	L 6–11	
October 23	Virginia	Worden Field; Annapolis, MD	L 0–5	
October 30	Princeton	Worden Field; Annapolis, MD	L 3–5	
November 6	Washington & Jefferson	Worden Field; Annapolis, MD	T 0–0	
November 13	Western Reserve	Worden Field; Annapolis, MD	W 17–6	
November 20	Davidson	Worden Field; Annapolis, MD	W 45–6	
