= 1909 TCU football team =

American college football season

1909 TCU football
- Conference: Texas Intercollegiate Athletic Association
- Record: 5–2–1 (2–0 TIAA)
- Head coach: Jesse R. Langley (2nd season)

The 1909 TCU football team represented Texas Christian University (TCU) as a member of the Texas Intercollegiate Athletic Association (TIAA) during the 1909 college football season. Led by Jesse R. Langley in his second and final year as head coach, TCU compiled an overall record of 5–2–1.

== Schedule ==
Date	Time	Opponent	Site	Result	Source
October 2		Polytechnic (TX)*	Waco, TX	W 42–0	
October 9		at Texas A&M*	College Station, TX (rivalry)	T 0–0	
October 16		at Baylor*	Carroll Field; Waco, TX (rivalry)	W 9–0	
October 23		Austin	Waco, TX	W 18–3	
October 30		at Texas*	Clark Field; Austin, TX (rivalry)	L 0–24	
November 6		at Baylor*	Carroll Field; Waco, TX	W 11–0	
November 15	4:30 p.m.	vs. Southwestern (TX)	Gaston Park; Dallas, TX	W 12–0	
November 25		at Baylor*	Carroll Field; Waco, TX	L 3–6	
*Non-conference game
