= 1909 North Carolina A&M Aggies football team =

American college football season

1909 North Carolina A&M Aggies football
- Conference: Independent
- Record: 6–1
- Head coach: Edward L. Greene (1st season)
- Home stadium: Riddick Stadium

1909 Southern college football independents records
	Conf.			Overall
Team	W	L	T	W		L		T
Arkansas		–		7	–	0	–	0
Texas A&M		–		7	–	0	–	1
Mississippi College		–		3	–	0	–	0
Stetson		–		3	–	0	–	1
Kentucky State		–		9	–	1	–	0
Virginia		–		7	–	1	–	0
North Carolina A&M		–		6	–	1	–	0
VPI		–		6	–	1	–	0
Florida		–		6	–	1	–	1
Elon		–		4	–	1	–	0
Louisiana Industrial		–		4	–	1	–	0
Spring Hill		–		4	–	1	–	0
Catholic University		–		0	–	1	–	1
North Carolina		–		5	–	2	–	0
Birmingham		–		4	–	2	–	0
Kendall		–		2	–	1	–	0
Southwestern Louisiana Industrial		–		5	–	2	–	2
Marshall		–		3	–	2	–	1
VMI		–		4	–	3	–	0
Navy		–		4	–	3	–	1
Texas		–		4	–	3	–	1
Tulane		–		4	–	3	–	2
West Virginia		–		4	–	3	–	2
Washington and Lee		–		4	–	3	–	0
Oklahoma		–		6	–	4	–	0
Georgetown		–		3	–	2	–	1
Oklahoma A&M		–		5	–	3	–	0
Davidson		–		3	–	4	–	2
George Washington		–		3	–	4	–	1
Chattanooga		–		2	–	3	–	2
Wake Forest		–		2	–	4	–	0
Maryland		–		2	–	5	–	0
South Carolina		–		2	–	6	–	0
Delaware		–		1	–	6	–	1

The 1909 North Carolina A&M Aggies football team represented the North Carolina A&M Aggies of North Carolina College of Agriculture and Mechanic Arts (now known as North Carolina State University) during the 1909 college football season.

== Schedule ==
Date	Time	Opponent	Site	Result	Attendance	Source
October 2		Maryville (TN)	Riddick Stadium; Raleigh, NC	W 30–0		
October 9		vs. Maryland Athletic Association	Lafayette Field; Norfolk, VA	W 12–0		
October 21		Kentucky State College	Riddick Stadium; Raleigh, NC	W 15–6		
October 30		Maryland	Riddick Stadium; Raleigh, NC	W 33–0		
November 6		at Washington and Lee	Wilson Field; Lexington, VA	W 3–0		
November 13		USS Franklin	Riddick Stadium; Raleigh, NC	W 5–0	3,000	
November 25	2:30 p.m.	vs. VPI	Athletic Park; Norfolk, VA	L 5–18	10,000	
