= 1909 Richmond Spiders football team =

American college football season

1909 Richmond Spiders football
- Conference: Eastern Virginia Intercollegiate Athletic Association
- Record: 3–5–2 (1–2 EVIAA)
- Head coach: E. A. Dunlap (5th season)
- Captain: Ewing P. Stringfellow
- Home stadium: Broad Street Park

1909 Eastern Virginia Intercollegiate Athletic Association football standings
	Conf.					Overall
Team	W		L		T	W		L		T
William & Mary	2	–	1	–	0	6	–	4	–	0
Randolph–Macon	2	–	1	–	0	3	–	2	–	2
Richmond	1	–	2	–	0	3	–	5	–	2
Hampden–Sydney	1	–	2	–	0	3	–	5	–	0

The 1909 Richmond Spiders football team was an American football team that represented Richmond College—now known as the University of Richmond—as a member of the Eastern Virginia Intercollegiate Athletic Association (EVIAA) during the 1909 college football season. Led by fifth-year head coach E. A. Dunlap, Richmond compiled a record of 3–5–2.

== Schedule ==
Date	Time	Opponent	Site	Result	Attendance	Source
October 2		Maryland*	Broad Street Park; Richmond, VA	W 12–0		
October 6	4:30 p.m.	Virginia Boat Club*	Broad Street Park; Richmond, VA	T 0–0		
October 9		Randolph–Macon*	Broad Street Park; Richmond, VA	T 0–0		
October 16		Georgetown*	Broad Street Park; Richmond, VA	L 0–17		
October 23		VPI*	Broad Street Park; Richmond, VA	L 0–52	1,500	
October 30	3:30 p.m.	at North Carolina*	Chapel Hill, NC	L 0–22		
November 5		at Wake Forest*	Wake Forest, NC	W 5–0		
November 13	3:30 p.m.	Hampden–Sydney	Broad Street Park; Richmond, VA	W 6–0		
November 20		William & Mary	Broad Street Park; Richmond, VA (rivalry)	L 0–15	2,000	
November 25	3:30 p.m.	Randolph–Macon	Broad Street Park; Richmond, VA	L 3–29		
*Non-conference game
