= 1909 VMI Keydets football team =

American college football season

1909 VMI Keydets football
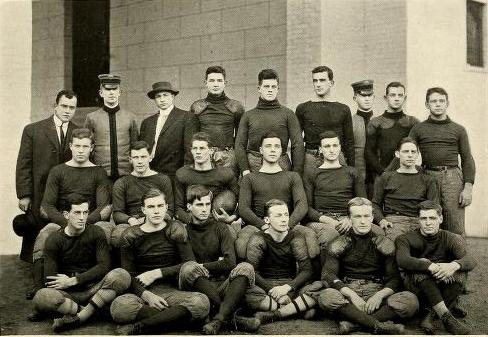
- Conference: Independent
- Record: 4–3
- Head coach: William Gloth (1st season)

1909 Southern college football independents records
	Conf.			Overall
Team	W	L	T	W		L		T
Arkansas		–		7	–	0	–	0
Texas A&M		–		7	–	0	–	1
Mississippi College		–		3	–	0	–	0
Stetson		–		3	–	0	–	1
Kentucky State		–		9	–	1	–	0
Virginia		–		7	–	1	–	0
North Carolina A&M		–		6	–	1	–	0
VPI		–		6	–	1	–	0
Florida		–		6	–	1	–	1
Elon		–		4	–	1	–	0
Louisiana Industrial		–		4	–	1	–	0
Spring Hill		–		4	–	1	–	0
Catholic University		–		0	–	1	–	1
North Carolina		–		5	–	2	–	0
Birmingham		–		4	–	2	–	0
Kendall		–		2	–	1	–	0
Southwestern Louisiana Industrial		–		5	–	2	–	2
Marshall		–		3	–	2	–	1
VMI		–		4	–	3	–	0
Navy		–		4	–	3	–	1
Texas		–		4	–	3	–	1
Tulane		–		4	–	3	–	2
West Virginia		–		4	–	3	–	2
Washington and Lee		–		4	–	3	–	0
Oklahoma		–		6	–	4	–	0
Georgetown		–		3	–	2	–	1
Oklahoma A&M		–		5	–	3	–	0
Davidson		–		3	–	4	–	2
George Washington		–		3	–	4	–	1
Chattanooga		–		2	–	3	–	2
Wake Forest		–		2	–	4	–	0
Maryland		–		2	–	5	–	0
South Carolina		–		2	–	6	–	0
Delaware		–		1	–	6	–	1

The 1909 VMI Keydets football team represented the Virginia Military Institute (VMI) in their 19th season of organized football. First-year coach William Gloth lead VMI to a 4–3 season.

== Schedule ==
Date	Opponent	Site	Result	Source
October 4	Roanoke	VMI Parade Ground; Lexington, VA	W 29–0	
October 9	William & Mary	VMI Parade Ground; Lexington, VA (rivalry)	W 6–0	
October 16	vs. North Carolina	Fairgrounds in Lynchburg; Lynchburg, VA	W 3–0	
October 30	St. John's (MD)	VMI Parade Ground; Lexington, VA	L 0–6	
November 6	at Virginia	Madison Hall Field; Charlottesville, VA	L 0–32	
November 13	Randolph–Macon*	VMI Parade Ground; Lexington, VA	W 21–5	
November 25	vs. Davidson	Lynchburg, VA	L 0–8	
*Non-conference game
