= Hoss Hodgson =

American football player and coach (1886–1967)

Profile
- Position: Guard

Personal information
- Born: March 5, 1886; Washington, DC, US
- Died: December 22, 1967 (aged 81); Poplarville, Mississippi, US

Career information
- College: Georgetown (1906); VPI (1907–1909)

Awards and highlights
- All-Southern (1906, 1907, 1908, 1909)

Emory Riddling "Hoss" Hodgson (March 5, 1886 – December 22, 1967) was an American football player and coach. He was a prominent guard and punter for the VPI Gobblers. Hodgson scored in the near upset of Princeton in 1909.
