= 1909 George Washington Hatchetites football team =

American college football season

1909 George Washington Hatchetites football
- Conference: Independent
- Record: 3–4–1
- Head coach: B. J. Dougherty (1st season)
- Home stadium: American League Park

1909 Southern college football independents records
	Conf.			Overall
Team	W	L	T	W		L		T
Arkansas		–		7	–	0	–	0
Texas A&M		–		7	–	0	–	1
Mississippi College		–		3	–	0	–	0
Stetson		–		3	–	0	–	1
Kentucky State		–		9	–	1	–	0
Virginia		–		7	–	1	–	0
North Carolina A&M		–		6	–	1	–	0
VPI		–		6	–	1	–	0
Florida		–		6	–	1	–	1
Elon		–		4	–	1	–	0
Louisiana Industrial		–		4	–	1	–	0
Spring Hill		–		4	–	1	–	0
Catholic University		–		0	–	1	–	1
North Carolina		–		5	–	2	–	0
Birmingham		–		4	–	2	–	0
Kendall		–		2	–	1	–	0
Southwestern Louisiana Industrial		–		5	–	2	–	2
Marshall		–		3	–	2	–	1
VMI		–		4	–	3	–	0
Navy		–		4	–	3	–	1
Texas		–		4	–	3	–	1
Tulane		–		4	–	3	–	2
West Virginia		–		4	–	3	–	2
Washington and Lee		–		4	–	3	–	0
Oklahoma		–		6	–	4	–	0
Georgetown		–		3	–	2	–	1
Oklahoma A&M		–		5	–	3	–	0
Davidson		–		3	–	4	–	2
George Washington		–		3	–	4	–	1
Chattanooga		–		2	–	3	–	2
Wake Forest		–		2	–	4	–	0
Maryland		–		2	–	5	–	0
South Carolina		–		2	–	6	–	0
Delaware		–		1	–	6	–	1

The 1909 George Washington Hatchetites Colonials football team was an American football team that represented George Washington University as an independent during the 1909 college football season. In their first season under head coach B. J. Dougherty, the team compiled a 3–4–1 record.

== Schedule ==
Date	Opponent	Site	Result	Source
October 2	Eastern College (VA)	American League Park; Washington, DC	W 23–0	
October 9	Western Maryland	American League Park; Washington, DC	T 0–0	
October 16	Washington College	American League Park; Washington, DC	W 8–5	
October 23	Maryland	American League Park; Washington, DC	W 26–0	
October 30	Ursinus	American League Park; Washington, DC	L 0–21	
November 6	Carlisle	American League Park; Washington, DC	L 5–9	
November 12	VPI	American League Park; Washington, DC	L 8–17	
November 25	Bucknell	American League Park; Washington, DC	L 6–12	
