= 1909 North Carolina Tar Heels football team =

American college football season

1909 North Carolina Tar Heels football
- Conference: Independent
- Record: 5–2
- Head coach: Arthur Brides (1st season)
- Captain: C. C. Garrett
- Home stadium: Campus Athletic Field (II)

1909 Southern college football independents records
	Conf.			Overall
Team	W	L	T	W		L		T
Arkansas		–		7	–	0	–	0
Texas A&M		–		7	–	0	–	1
Mississippi College		–		3	–	0	–	0
Stetson		–		3	–	0	–	1
Kentucky State		–		9	–	1	–	0
Virginia		–		7	–	1	–	0
North Carolina A&M		–		6	–	1	–	0
VPI		–		6	–	1	–	0
Florida		–		6	–	1	–	1
Elon		–		4	–	1	–	0
Louisiana Industrial		–		4	–	1	–	0
Spring Hill		–		4	–	1	–	0
Catholic University		–		0	–	1	–	1
North Carolina		–		5	–	2	–	0
Birmingham		–		4	–	2	–	0
Kendall		–		2	–	1	–	0
Southwestern Louisiana Industrial		–		5	–	2	–	2
Marshall		–		3	–	2	–	1
VMI		–		4	–	3	–	0
Navy		–		4	–	3	–	1
Texas		–		4	–	3	–	1
Tulane		–		4	–	3	–	2
West Virginia		–		4	–	3	–	2
Washington and Lee		–		4	–	3	–	0
Oklahoma		–		6	–	4	–	0
Georgetown		–		3	–	2	–	1
Oklahoma A&M		–		5	–	3	–	0
Davidson		–		3	–	4	–	2
George Washington		–		3	–	4	–	1
Chattanooga		–		2	–	3	–	2
Wake Forest		–		2	–	4	–	0
Maryland		–		2	–	5	–	0
South Carolina		–		2	–	6	–	0
Delaware		–		1	–	6	–	1

The 1909 North Carolina Tar Heels football team represented the University of North Carolina in the 1909 college football season. The team captain of the 1909 season was C.C. Garrett.

== Schedule ==
Date	Time	Opponent	Site	Result	Attendance	Source
October 2		Wake Forest	Campus Athletic Field (II); Chapel Hill, NC (rivalry)	W 18–0		
October 9		at Tennessee	Wait Field; Knoxville, TN	W 3–0	2,000	
October 16		vs. VMI	Fair Grounds (Lynchburg); Lynchburg, VA	L 0–3		
October 23	3:00 p.m.	at Georgetown	Georgetown Field; Washington DC	W 5–0		
October 30	3:30 p.m.	Richmond	Campus Athletic Field (II); Chapel Hill, NC	W 22–0		
November 6	3:30 p.m.	vs. VPI	Broad Street Park (I); Richmond, VA	L 0–15	2,000	
November 13	2:00 p.m.	vs. Washington and Lee	Casino Park; Newport News, VA	W 6–0	1,000	
