= 1909 Washington and Lee Generals football team =

American college football season

1909 Washington and Lee Generals football
- Conference: Independent
- Record: 4–3
- Head coach: Timothy N. Pfeiffer (1st season)
- Home stadium: Wilson Field

1909 Southern college football independents records
	Conf.			Overall
Team	W	L	T	W		L		T
Arkansas		–		7	–	0	–	0
Texas A&M		–		7	–	0	–	1
Mississippi College		–		3	–	0	–	0
Stetson		–		3	–	0	–	1
Kentucky State		–		9	–	1	–	0
Virginia		–		7	–	1	–	0
North Carolina A&M		–		6	–	1	–	0
VPI		–		6	–	1	–	0
Florida		–		6	–	1	–	1
Elon		–		4	–	1	–	0
Louisiana Industrial		–		4	–	1	–	0
Spring Hill		–		4	–	1	–	0
Catholic University		–		0	–	1	–	1
North Carolina		–		5	–	2	–	0
Birmingham		–		4	–	2	–	0
Kendall		–		2	–	1	–	0
Southwestern Louisiana Industrial		–		5	–	2	–	2
Marshall		–		3	–	2	–	1
VMI		–		4	–	3	–	0
Navy		–		4	–	3	–	1
Texas		–		4	–	3	–	1
Tulane		–		4	–	3	–	2
West Virginia		–		4	–	3	–	2
Washington and Lee		–		4	–	3	–	0
Oklahoma		–		6	–	4	–	0
Georgetown		–		3	–	2	–	1
Oklahoma A&M		–		5	–	3	–	0
Davidson		–		3	–	4	–	2
George Washington		–		3	–	4	–	1
Chattanooga		–		2	–	3	–	2
Wake Forest		–		2	–	4	–	0
Maryland		–		2	–	5	–	0
South Carolina		–		2	–	6	–	0
Delaware		–		1	–	6	–	1

The 1909 Washington and Lee Generals football team was an American football team that represented Washington and Lee University during the 1909 college football season as an independent. In their first year under head coach Timothy N. Pfeiffer, the team compiled an overall record of 4–3.

== Schedule ==
Date	Opponent	Site	Result	Attendance	Source
October 2	Roanoke	Wilson Field; Lexington, VA	W 24–0		
October 9	Hampden–Sydney	Wilson Field; Lexington, VA	W 6–0		
October 16	Wake Forest	Wilson Field; Lexington, VA	W 17–0		
October 22	vs. Davidson	Fair Grounds; Roanoke, VA	W 18–6		
October 30	vs. VPI	Lynchburg, VA	L 6–34	2,200	
November 6	North Carolina A&M	Wilson Field; Lexington, VA	L 0–3		
November 13	vs. North Carolina	Casino Park; Newport News, VA	L 0–6	1,000	
