= 1909 William & Mary Orange and White football team =

American college football season

1909 William & Mary Orange and White football

EVIAA co-champion
- Conference: Eastern Virginia Intercollegiate Athletic Association
- Record: 6–4 (2–1 EVIAA)
- Head coach: George E. O'Hearn (2nd season)
- Captain: James G. Driver

1909 Eastern Virginia Intercollegiate Athletic Association football standings
	Conf.					Overall
Team	W		L		T	W		L		T
William & Mary	2	–	1	–	0	6	–	4	–	0
Randolph–Macon	2	–	1	–	0	3	–	2	–	2
Richmond	1	–	2	–	0	3	–	5	–	2
Hampden–Sydney	1	–	2	–	0	3	–	5	–	0

The 1909 William & Mary Orange and White football team^{[a]} represented the College of William & Mary as a member of the Eastern Virginia Intercollegiate Athletic Association (EVIAA) during the 1909 college football season. Le by George E. O'Hearn in his second and final year as head coach, the Orange and White compiled an overall record of 6–4.

== Schedule ==
Date	Opponent	Site	Result	Attendance	Source
September 18	at Virginia*	Madison Hall Field; Charlottesville, VA	L 0–30		
October 2	Norfolk Blues*	Williamsburg, VA	W 3–0		
October 9	at VMI*	VMI Parade Ground; Lexington, VA (rivalry)	L 0–6		
October 11	Medical College of Virginia*	Williamsburg, VA	W 6–0		
October 16	Episcopal High School*	Williamsburg, VA	W 9–0		
October 23	vs. Randolph–Macon	Richmond, VA	L 3–15		
October 30	at Hampden–Sydney*	Hampden Sydney, VA	L 3–22		
November 6	at Norfolk High School*	Norfolk, VA	W 11–0		
November 20	at Richmond	Broad Street Park; Richmond, VA (rivalry)	W 15–0	2,000	
November 25	at Hampden–Sydney	Hampden Sydney, VA	W 15–8		
*Non-conference game

== Notes ==
- ^{a} Between 1896 and 1909 their nickname was "Orange and White," deriving that name from the school's former colors (William & Mary now uses green and gold). Since white uniforms dirtied too quickly, they became known as the "Orange and Black" from 1910 through 1916. Between 1917 and 1977 they were known as the Indians, and throughout this period a man dressing up as a Native American would ride around on a pony along the sidelines during games. This practice was discontinued when the outcry of stereotyping Native Americans as well as the use of a live animal became controversial. Since the 1978 season William & Mary has adopted the nickname "Tribe."
