= 1909 Virginia Orange and Blue football team =

American college football season

1909 Virginia Orange and Blue football
- Conference: Independent
- Record: 7–1
- Head coach: John Neff (1st season)
- Captains: B. R. Cecil; Kemper Yancey
- Home stadium: Madison Hall Field

1909 Southern college football independents records
	Conf.			Overall
Team	W	L	T	W		L		T
Arkansas		–		7	–	0	–	0
Texas A&M		–		7	–	0	–	1
Mississippi College		–		3	–	0	–	0
Stetson		–		3	–	0	–	1
Kentucky State		–		9	–	1	–	0
Virginia		–		7	–	1	–	0
North Carolina A&M		–		6	–	1	–	0
VPI		–		6	–	1	–	0
Florida		–		6	–	1	–	1
Elon		–		4	–	1	–	0
Louisiana Industrial		–		4	–	1	–	0
Spring Hill		–		4	–	1	–	0
Catholic University		–		0	–	1	–	1
North Carolina		–		5	–	2	–	0
Birmingham		–		4	–	2	–	0
Kendall		–		2	–	1	–	0
Southwestern Louisiana Industrial		–		5	–	2	–	2
Marshall		–		3	–	2	–	1
VMI		–		4	–	3	–	0
Navy		–		4	–	3	–	1
Texas		–		4	–	3	–	1
Tulane		–		4	–	3	–	2
West Virginia		–		4	–	3	–	2
Washington and Lee		–		4	–	3	–	0
Oklahoma		–		6	–	4	–	0
Georgetown		–		3	–	2	–	1
Oklahoma A&M		–		5	–	3	–	0
Davidson		–		3	–	4	–	2
George Washington		–		3	–	4	–	1
Chattanooga		–		2	–	3	–	2
Wake Forest		–		2	–	4	–	0
Maryland		–		2	–	5	–	0
South Carolina		–		2	–	6	–	0
Delaware		–		1	–	6	–	1

The 1909 Virginia Orange and Blue football team represented the University of Virginia as an independent during the 1903 college football season. Led by John Neff in his first and only season as head coach, the Orange and Blue compiled a record of 7–1.

Freshman Archer Christian was trampled to death in the Georgetown game.

== Schedule ==
Date	Time	Opponent	Site	Result	Source
September 18		William & Mary	Madison Hall Field; Charlottesville, VA	W 30–0	
September 25		Hampden–Sydney	Madison Hall Field; Charlottesville, VA	W 37–0	
October 1		Davidson	Madison Hall Field; Charlottesville, VA	W 11–0	
October 9		St. John's (MD)	Madison Hall Field; Charlottesville, VA	W 12–0	
October 16	2:30 p.m.	vs. Lehigh	Lafayette Field; Norfolk, VA	L 7–11	
October 23		at Navy	Worden Field; Annapolis, MD	W 5–0	
November 6		VMI	Madison Hall Field; Charlottesville, VA	W 32–0	
November 13	2:30 p.m.	at Georgetown	Georgetown Field; Washington, DC	W 21–0	
