= Logan Cunningham (coach) =

American football player and coach (1887–1964)

Biographical details
- Born: February 22, 1887
- Died: November 1964; Pittsburgh, Pennsylvania, U.S.

Playing career
- 1909: Princeton
- Positions: Halfback, fullback

Coaching career (HC unless noted)
- 1911: Princeton (freshmen)
- 1912: Princeton
- 1916: North Carolina (assistant)

Head coaching record
- Overall: 7–1–1

Logan Cunningham (February 22, 1887 – November 1964) was an American college football coach. He was the head football coach at Princeton University in 1912.

== Biography ==
A native of Washington, D.C., Cunningham attended Wesleyan University in Connecticut for two years before transferring to Princeton University. At Princeton, he played on the football team as a halfback and fullback, and was considered an expert drop kicker. He also played on the baseball team as a pitcher. Cunningham studied civil engineering and graduated in 1911.

In 1911, Cunningham coached the freshman team at his alma mater and also mentored the varsity team in the art of drop kicking. After Princeton head coach Bill Roper resigned to focus on his business, the school offered the job to Eddie Hart, but he declined the full-time position. Cunningham accepted the job, and guided the Tigers to a 7–1–1 record in his only season at the helm. Cunningham was invited to return as head coach in 1913, but declined to attend to "business duties".

Cunningham enlisted in the Pennsylvania National Guard in 1913 and served on the Mexican border as an artilleryman. In 1916, he was an assistant coach under Doggie Trenchard at the University of North Carolina. In the Fall of 1917, he was commissioned as a first lieutenant at Camp Hancock in Augusta, Georgia, and served in the Aviation Section of the Signal Corps. On March 30, 1918, he was seriously hurt in an aircraft accident at Fort Sill, Oklahoma, suffering a dislocated hip and fractured arm. By February 1919, he had returned to civilian life and was working at the Williamsport Wirerope Works in Williamsport, Pennsylvania.

== Head coaching record ==
Year	Team	Overall	Conference	Standing	Bowl/playoffs
Princeton Tigers (Independent) (1912)
1912	Princeton	7–1–1			
Princeton:		7–1–1			
Total:		7–1–1			
