= 1909 college football season =

American college football season

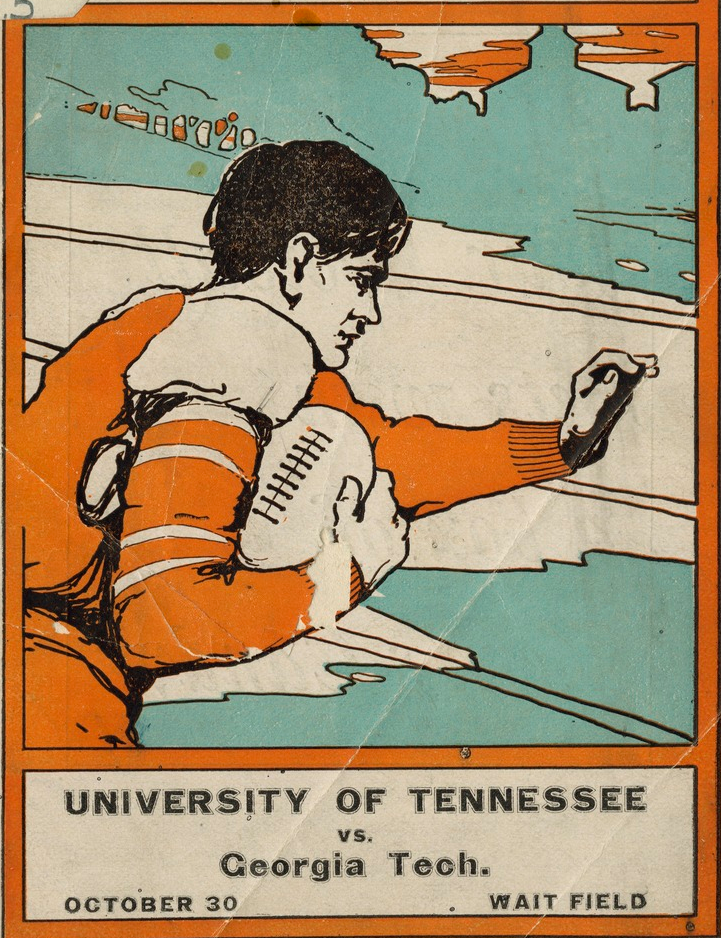
- Tennessee football program
- Total No. of teams: 74
- Regular season: September 25–November 25
- Champion: Yale

The 1909 college football season was the first for the 3-point field goal, which had previously been worth 4 points. The season ran from Saturday, September 25, until Thanksgiving Day, November 25, although a few games were played on the week before.

The 1909 season was also one of the most dangerous in the history of college football. The third annual survey by the Chicago Tribune at season's end showed that 10 college players had been killed and 38 seriously injured in 1909, up from six fatalities and 14 maimings in 1908.

Schools in the Midwest competed in the Western Conference consisting of Illinois, Indiana, Iowa, Minnesota, Northwestern, Purdue and Wisconsin and Chicago. Iowa was also a member of the Missouri Valley Conference, which included future Big 12 teams Iowa State, Kansas, Missouri, and Nebraska, as well as Drake and Washington University in St. Louis. In California, intercollegiate football programs (such as those of Stanford University and the University of California) had been discontinued after the 1905 season, and rugby was the autumn intercollegiate sport.

Although there was no provision for a national championship, major teams played their regular schedules before facing their most difficult matches late in the season. The most eagerly anticipated games were the November 10 matchups, with Princeton at Yale, Dartmouth at Harvard, Michigan vs. Pennsylvania (in Philadelphia), and Cornell at Chicago.

== Rules ==
The rules for American football in 1909 were significantly different than the ones of a century later, as many of the present conventions (100 yard field, four downs to gain ten yards, and the 6-point touchdown) would not be adopted until 1912.

Beginning in 1909, the worth of a field goal dropped from 4 points to 3 points. Touchdowns remained at 5 points. "This has come about gradually," noted one report, "owing to the feeling of players and spectators that two field kick goals should not be reckoned of greater value that a touchdown from which a goal is scored. As it is now, a touchdown if a goal results, counts six points, and two field goals count but six in the aggregate." For the first time, ineligible receivers were identified.

The rules in 1909 were:

- Field 110 yards in length
- Kickoff made from midfield
- Three downs to gain ten yards
- Touchdown worth 5 points
- Field goal worth 3 points
- Game time based on agreement of the teams, not to exceed two 45 minute halves
- Forward pass legal, but subject to penalties

== Conference and program changes ==
=== Conference changes ===
- The Colorado Faculty Athletic Conference (CFAC, later the Rocky Mountain Athletic Conference) began its first season of play in 1909 with four teams in Colorado.

=== Membership changes ===
School	1908 Conference	1909 Conference
Colorado Buffaloes	Colorado	CFAC (Rocky Mountain)
Colorado Agricultural Rams	Colorado	CFAC (Rocky Mountain)
Colorado College Tigers	Colorado	CFAC (Rocky Mountain)
Colorado Mines Orediggers	Colorado	CFAC (Rocky Mountain)
Hawaiʻi Fighting Deans	Program Established	Independent
Troy Normal football	Program Established	Independent

== September ==
The Carlisle Indians played a Wednesday afternoon game on September 22 at home against Lebanon Valley, winning 30–0. The previous Saturday, they had beaten a non-college team from Steelton, Pennsylvania, 35–0.

On September 25, defending champion Pennsylvania beat Gettysburg College 20–0 on two touchdowns, and a field goal (one of the first three-pointers) by Edmund Thayer. Carlisle beat visiting Villanova 9–0. Washington and Jefferson defeated Denison College 13–2. Lehigh beat Lebanon Valley 24–0. To the west, Ohio State defeated Otterbein 14–0, Minnesota beat Lawrence 26–0, and Kansas crushed Kansas Normal (now Emporia State) 55–0. St. Louis edged Shurtleff College 12–11. In the South, Virginia defeated William and Mary 30–0 in a short (two 15 minute halves) game at home and Vanderbilt defeated Southwestern Presbyterian (now Rhodes College) 52–0.

Defending co-champion Harvard opened its season in a Wednesday afternoon game, beating Bates College 11–0 on September 29. In other home openers, Brown beat Rhode Island 6–0, Yale beat Wesleyan 11–0, and Dartmouth beat Massachusetts 22–0. Pennsylvania moved to 2–0–0 with a 22–0 win over Ursinus.

== October ==
On October 2, Brown beat Colgate 12–0, Yale defeated Syracuse 15–0 and Harvard won against Bowdoin 17–0. Army opened its season with a 22–0 win over Tufts. Pennsylvania earned its third win, over Dickinson, 28–0. Elsewhere, Auburn won 11–0 over Howard College (now Samford University), Pitt defeated Ohio Northern 16–0, North Carolina beat Wake Forest 18–0, Arkansas won 24–0 over Henderson State, and Kansas beat little St. Mary's College of Kansas 29–0. State College of Pennsylvania rolled over Grove City, 31–0, North Carolina A&M (now N.C. State) trampled Maryville (Tennessee) College 39–0. In Western Conference play, Chicago overwhelmed Purdue 40–0, and Minnesota crushed Iowa 41–0. Carlisle yielded a score in a 48–6 win over Bucknell, and Princeton surrendered two touchdowns in a 47–12 win over Stevens. Dartmouth was unable to score in a 0–0 tie with Vermont. Lehigh lost at home to Franklin and Marshall, 10–0. In a game the day before, Virginia held off Davidson, 11–0.

In four midweek games on October 6, Navy opened its season with a 16–6 win over the other Annapolis school, St. John's College, and Princeton defeated Villanova, 12–0. Yale, in a 12–0 win over Holy Cross, and Brown (which beat Bates, 17–0), both stayed unscored upon and upped their records to 3–0–0.

October 9: Fewer teams stayed unscored upon. Yale won 33–0 over the Springfield Training School college team, Penn defeated West Virginia 12–0, and Brown won 10–0 over Amherst College. Further south, Virginia beat St. John's of Maryland, 12–0. All four winners were 4–0–0. Harvard was surprised by Williams College, which led in the first half before the Crimson eked out an 8–6 win, and Princeton struggled against Fordham, averting defeat with a last minute field goal, 3–0. Pitt beat Marietta College, 12–0, and Lafayette rolled 50–0 over Hobart College.

Opening their seasons were defending southern champion LSU with a 10–0 triumph over visiting Ole Miss, Kansas (11–0 over Oklahoma), Texas (12–0 over Southwestern), Texas A&M (17–0 over Austin), Wisconsin opened with a 22–0 win over Lawrence College. and Michigan, which struggled in a 3–0 win over Case. Alabama defeated Howard College 14–0, and Arkansas allowed at TD in beating Drury, 12–6. Western Conference games saw Chicago beat Indiana 12–0 and Minnesota defeat Iowa State, 18–0, but Illinois was surprised by visiting Kentucky State College (later the University of Kentucky), 6–2. When the Kentucky team was welcomed home, Philip Carbusier said that they had "fought like wildcats", a nickname that stuck. Navy won 12–3 over Rutgers and Army beat Trinity College of Connecticut, 17–6.

The biggest game of the week was at Wilkes-Barre, where Penn State and Carlisle met on neutral ground. Down 6–5 when Larry Vorhis missed the point after, State was up 8–6 on a Vorhis field goal. Vorhis was sacked in the end zone by Emil Wauseka during a punt return, and the game ended 8–8.

October 13: In a midweek game, Princeton found itself losing 6–5 to visiting Virginia Tech after an interception was returned for a touchdown. The Tigers stayed unbeaten (4–0–0) on a drop kicked field goal in the last four minutes.

October 16: At Philadelphia, Pennsylvania hosted Brown. Both were unbeaten (4–0–0), and neither had been scored upon. Penn shut down the Bears offense and won 13–5. Yale, also 4–0–0 in four shutouts, earned a fifth, handing Army its first defeat, 17–0. In an intersectional battle of Tigers, Princeton handed visiting Sewanee its first defeat, 20–0. Once-tied Carlisle faced Syracuse at New York's Polo Grounds and won 14–11. Pitt yielded its first points in an 18–6 win over Bucknell, and Harvard handled Maine, 17–0. Navy was upset by Villanova, 11–6.

In the South, Virginia, unbeaten (4–0–0) and unscored upon, was upset by a (1–1–1) Lehigh team, 11–7, in a game at Norfolk. LSU beat Mississippi A&M (now Mississippi State), 15–0. Alabama edged Clemson, 3–0, at Birmingham. Arkansas defeated Wichita State, 23–6. Texas A&M and Texas Christian played a scoreless tie. To the West, Chicago beat Illinois, 14–8. Minnesota defeated Nebraska, 14–0. Michigan handed Ohio State its 10th consecutive defeat. Kansas defeated Kansas Agricultural (now Kansas State), 5–3, and Missouri beat visiting Missouri School of Mines (of Rolla, now Missouri S & T) 13–0.

October 23: In Philadelphia, Pennsylvania (5–0–0) hosted Penn State (2–0–1) in a battle of unbeatens. Penn fumbled away two chances to score in the first half, but took a 3–0 lead on a 35–yard field goal. Penn State came within 15 yards of a touchdown, but settled for a dropkicked field goal to tie the Quakers. Harvard handed Brown a second straight loss, 11–0. At Pittsburgh, Pitt hosted unbeaten (3–0–1) Carlisle and won 14–3. Yale Bulldogs stayed unscored on and reached 6–0–0 with a 36–0 win over Colgate. The other major unbeaten team in the east, Princeton, was upset by visiting Lafayette, after the Leopards' Frank Irmschler blocked a field goal in the final six seconds and returned it 92 yards for a touchdown, winning 6–0 in what the New York Times termed "probably the most sensational finish that has ever been seen in a football game." Navy was defeated at home, 5–0, by Virginia.

In the South, Vanderbilt hosted Auburn in a meeting of 3–0–0 teams at Nashville, with Vandy winning 17–0. Alabama and Ole Miss played a scoreless tie at Jackson. Arkansas defeated Oklahoma 21–6. Sewanee beat Georgia Tech in Atlanta, 15–0. To the West, Michigan averted being tied by Marquette, 6–5. Wisconsin beat Indiana 6–3. Missouri was tied by Iowa State, 6–6, and Kansas (4–0–0) hosted Washington University in St. Louis (2–0–0) and won 23–0.

On October 30, the fatal injury of Army player Eugene Byrne, at a game against visiting Harvard, overshadowed the other games of the day. With ten minutes left to play, Byrne had broken his neck in a collision with three Harvard men. The game was halted with Harvard ahead, 9–0. Byrne died the next morning, and Army canceled the remainder of its schedule, including the annual Army–Navy Game.

In other contests Penn beat Carlisle, 29–6. Princeton beat Navy at Annapolis, 5–3. The Lafayette Leopards, who had upset Princeton the week before, tied Penn State, 6–6, giving the Nittany Lions a record of 2 wins, 3 ties, and no losses. Meanwhile, the Yale Bulldogs remained unscored upon as they registered their seventh consecutive shutout, a 34–0 win over visiting Amherst College. Yale had an average score of 21–0 against its opposition, but still had to face Brown, Princeton and Harvard.

In Western Conference play (the future Big Ten) between two unbeatens, Minnesota defeated visiting Chicago, 20–6. Wisconsin won at Northwestern, 21–11. Further west, Missouri edged Iowa, 13–12, and Kansas won at Washburn, 17–0.

In a big game at New Orleans, the LSU Tigers suffered their first defeat in almost two years, losing to Sewanee's Tigers, 15–6. At Nashville, Vanderbilt beat Ole Miss, 17–0, and at Atlanta, Alabama beat Georgia, 14–0. Texas A&M won at Baylor, 9–6. N.C. State (North Carolina A&M) beat visiting Maryland 31–0, Virginia beat VMI 32–0, and Arkansas clobbered Ouachita College, 56–0. TCU lost at Texas, 24–0.

In intersectional games, Michigan beat visiting Syracuse 44–0, while Pittsburgh was upset by visiting Notre Dame, 6–0.

== November ==
On November 6 Yale remained unscored upon, beating Brown, 23–0. Harvard beat Cornell 18–0, and Penn State beat Bucknell 33–0. Penn averted a defeat by visiting Lafayette, managing a 6–6 tie. Other ties were between Princeton and Dartmouth (6–6), Pittsburgh and West Virginia (0–0), and Navy and Washington & Jefferson (0–0). The "Jeffs" had a 7–0–0 record before meeting Navy, against smaller schools. To the west, previously unbeaten (5–0–0) Michigan was upset at home by unheralded Notre Dame, 11–3. Michigan's Coach Fielding H. Yost told a reporter after the game, "I take my hat off to the Irishmen", and a story in the Detroit Free Press the next day made the "Fighting Irishmen" a nickname that would ever after stick with Notre Dame. Kansas won at Nebraska 6–0, to stay unbeaten, and once-tied Missouri beat Washington University in St. Louis, 5–0. Minnesota and Wisconsin were both idle and preparing to meet at Madison on November 13. In the South, Vanderbilt defeated visiting Tennessee, 23–0, and North Carolina A&M (N.C. State) won at Washington & Lee 3–0. Virginia beat visiting VMI 32–0. LSU had won earlier in a Thursday game at Louisiana Tech, 23–0. Further west, the University of California played a football game, beating the University of Nevada 19–8, and the University of Colorado beat the University of New Mexico, 53–0. In a Monday game at Houston, Texas A&M defeated Texas 23–0 to stay unbeaten.

November 13 saw a number of intersectional games. Previously unbeaten and untied Vanderbilt (5–0–0) traveled to Columbus, O. and lost 5–0 to Ohio State. On the same afternoon, unbeaten (5–0–2) Pennsylvania went to Ann Arbor to meet once-beaten (4–1–0) Michigan, and sustained their first loss, 12–6. Penn State stayed unbeaten, reaching 5–0–2 after defeating visiting West Virginia 40–0. Lafayette went to 5–0–1 after beating Stroudsburg, 43–0.

At a Western Conference game between two unbeatens at Madison, Wisconsin, Minnesota (5–0–0) faced Wisconsin (3–0–0). The visitors won 34–6. In the MVIAA, Missouri (5–0–1) hosted Drake (4–0–0 against smaller opponents), and Missouri won 22–6. Arkansas (5–0–0) and LSU (4–1–0) met at Memphis, and the "Cardinals" of Arkansas won 16–0. Coach Hugo Bezdek remarked that his players were like "a wild band of razorback hogs", giving Arkansas teams a new nickname. Alabama stayed unbeaten with a 10–0 win at Tennessee, and Texas A&M reached 5–0–1 with a 47–0 win over visiting Trinity College of Dallas (and three days later at Dallas, A&M defeated Oklahoma, 14–8)

Kansas and North Carolina A&M were idle. Virginia won at Georgetown, 21–0, but the Cavaliers' halfback Archer Christian was fatally injured.

In the East, unbeaten, untied and unscored on Yale (8–0–0) hosted once-beaten Princeton (5–1–1). Yale had a ninth straight shutout, winning 17–0 in its last game before it would meet Harvard, which raised its record to 8–0–0, defeating Dartmouth 12–3.

== Yale vs. Harvard ==
- On November 20 Yale, which had allowed no points in nine games, played its only away game of the season, facing the Harvard Crimson, who had allowed only 9 points all season. Both teams were unbeaten and untied, and met before 38,000 at Cambridge. Yale's Carroll T. Cooney blocked a punt by Wayland Minot, who fell on the ball in the end zone for a safety, and a 2–0 Yale lead. Later, Stephen Philbin's 30 yard run brought Yale to the Harvard 20, and Ted Coy kicked a field goal for a 5–0 Yale lead at halftime. In the second half, Harvard made it past the 55 yard line only once, but still kept Yale out of its end zone. Coy managed another field goal late in the game, and Yale won 8–0.

In other games played on November 20, unbeaten (6–0–0) Minnesota lost, at home, to once-beaten (5–1–0) Michigan, 15–6. Kansas stayed unbeaten with a 20–7 win over visiting Iowa. In its annual game against Lehigh, Lafayette won 21–0, while at New Orleans, Alabama and Tulane played to a 5–5 tie.

Other teams closed out their seasons with games on Thanksgiving Day (November 25). At Kansas City, the MVIAA championship came down to unbeaten (9–0–0) Kansas against unbeaten and once-tied (6–0–1) Missouri. The Missouri Tigers won, 12–6.

Arkansas beat Washington University in St. Louis 32–0 to finish unbeaten and untied (7–0–0). Arkansas was considered the unofficial "Champions of the South" for 1909. Colorado beat Colorado School of Mines 16–0 in a season with four college games, for a 6–0–0 finish.

Lafayette beat Dickinson, Texas A&M won at Texas, and Penn State won at Pittsburgh; the score was 5–0 in all three games, and all three winners finished unbeaten. At Norfolk, unbeaten North Carolina A & M (the future N.C. State) lost to once-beaten Virginia Tech, 18–5, and at Birmingham, unbeaten Alabama lost to LSU, 12–6.

== Conference standings ==
=== Major conference standings ===
1909 Missouri Valley Conference football standings
	Conf.					Overall
Team	W		L		T	W		L		T
Missouri $	4	–	0	–	1	7	–	0	–	1
Kansas	3	–	1	–	0	8	–	1	–	0
Drake	2	–	1	–	0	6	–	1	–	0
Iowa	1	–	3	–	1	2	–	4	–	1
Iowa State	0	–	2	–	1	4	–	3	–	1
Nebraska	0	–	1	–	0	3	–	3	–	2
Washington University	0	–	2	–	0	3	–	4	–	0
$ – Conference champion

1909 Northwest Conference football standings
	Conf.					Overall
Team	W		L		T	W		L		T
Washington +	4	–	0	–	0	7	–	0	–	0
Washington State +	2	–	0	–	0	4	–	1	–	0
Oregon	2	–	1	–	0	3	–	2	–	0
Oregon Agricultural	1	–	2	–	0	4	–	2	–	1
Whitman	1	–	3	–	0	4	–	3	–	1
Idaho	0	–	4	–	0	3	–	4	–	0
+ – Conference co-champions

1909 Southern Intercollegiate Athletic Association football standings
	Conf.					Overall
Team	W		L		T	W		L		T
Sewanee $	4	–	0	–	0	6	–	1	–	0
Vanderbilt	4	–	1	–	0	7	–	3	–	0
Alabama	4	–	1	–	1	5	–	1	–	2
LSU	3	–	1	–	0	6	–	2	–	0
Georgia Tech	4	–	2	–	0	7	–	2	–	0
Auburn	4	–	2	–	0	5	–	2	–	0
Howard (AL)	2	–	2	–	0	5	–	2	–	1
Clemson	2	–	2	–	0	6	–	3	–	0
Ole Miss	1	–	2	–	1	4	–	3	–	2
Mississippi A&M	1	–	3	–	0	5	–	4	–	0
Georgia	1	–	4	–	1	1	–	4	–	2
The Citadel	0	–	1	–	1	3	–	3	–	2
Cumberland (TN)	0	–	1	–	0	0	–	1	–	0
Mercer	0	–	4	–	0	3	–	5	–	0
Tennessee	0	–	5	–	0	1	–	6	–	2
$ – Conference champion

1909 Western Conference football standings
	Conf.					Overall
Team	W		L		T	W		L		T
Minnesota $	3	–	0	–	0	6	–	1	–	0
Chicago	4	–	1	–	1	4	–	1	–	2
Illinois	3	–	1	–	0	5	–	2	–	0
Wisconsin	2	–	1	–	1	3	–	1	–	1
Indiana	1	–	3	–	0	4	–	3	–	0
Northwestern	1	–	3	–	0	1	–	3	–	1
Iowa	0	–	1	–	0	2	–	4	–	1
Purdue	0	–	4	–	0	2	–	5	–	0
$ – Conference champion

=== Independents ===
1909 Eastern college football independents records
	Conf.			Overall
Team	W	L	T	W		L		T
Yale		–		10	–	0	–	0
Lafayette		–		7	–	0	–	1
Franklin & Marshall		–		9	–	1	–	0
Harvard		–		9	–	1	–	0
Penn State		–		5	–	0	–	2
Washington & Jefferson		–		8	–	1	–	1
Springfield Training School		–		5	–	1	–	0
NYU		–		6	–	1	–	1
Ursinus		–		6	–	1	–	1
Penn		–		7	–	1	–	2
Trinity (CT)		–		6	–	1	–	2
Dartmouth		–		5	–	1	–	2
Fordham		–		5	–	1	–	2
Princeton		–		6	–	2	–	1
Pittsburgh		–		6	–	2	–	1
Carlisle		–		8	–	3	–	1
Colgate		–		5	–	2	–	1
Brown		–		7	–	3	–	1
Geneva		–		4	–	2	–	0
Carnegie Tech		–		5	–	3	–	1
Vermont		–		4	–	2	–	2
Lehigh		–		4	–	3	–	2
Army		–		3	–	2	–	0
Villanova		–		3	–	2	–	0
Dickinson		–		4	–	4	–	1
Syracuse		–		4	–	5	–	1
Bucknell		–		3	–	4	–	2
Boston College		–		3	–	4	–	1
Cornell		–		3	–	4	–	1
New Hampshire		–		3	–	4	–	0
Rhode Island State		–		3	–	4	–	0
Rutgers		–		3	–	5	–	1
Wesleyan		–		3	–	5	–	1
Holy Cross		–		2	–	4	–	2
Swarthmore		–		2	–	5	–	0
Drexel		–		1	–	5	–	3
Tufts		–		2	–	6	–	0
Amherst		–		1	–	6	–	1
Temple		–		0	–	4	–	1

1909 Midwestern college football independents records
	Conf.			Overall
Team	W	L	T	W		L		T
Iowa State Normal		–		6	–	0	–	0
Notre Dame		–		7	–	0	–	1
Michigan Agricultural		–		8	–	1	–	0
Carthage		–		6	–	1	–	0
Michigan		–		6	–	1	–	0
Western State Normal		–		6	–	1	–	0
Mount Union		–		8	–	2	–	0
Lake Forest		–		5	–	1	–	1
Haskell		–		7	–	2	–	0
Detroit College		–		3	–	1	–	2
Butler		–		5	–	3	–	0
Central Michigan		–		4	–	3	–	0
St. Mary's (OH)		–		4	–	3	–	0
Cincinnati		–		4	–	3	–	1
Doane		–		3	–	2	–	3
Buchtel		–		4	–	4	–	0
Rose Poly		–		4	–	4	–	0
Marquette		–		2	–	2	–	1
North Dakota Agricultural		–		2	–	2	–	1
Wabash		–		3	–	4	–	1
Miami (OH)		–		3	–	4	–	0
Ohio		–		2	–	4	–	2
Saint Louis		–		3	–	5	–	0
Michigan State Normal		–		2	–	4	–	0
Western Illinois		–		1	–	2	–	0
Fairmount		–		2	–	5	–	1
Northern Illinois State		–		2	–	6	–	0
South Dakota State		–		1	–	3	–	0
Heidelberg		–		0	–	7	–	2

1909 Southern college football independents records
	Conf.			Overall
Team	W	L	T	W		L		T
Arkansas		–		7	–	0	–	0
Texas A&M		–		7	–	0	–	1
Mississippi College		–		3	–	0	–	0
Stetson		–		3	–	0	–	1
Kentucky State		–		9	–	1	–	0
Virginia		–		7	–	1	–	0
North Carolina A&M		–		6	–	1	–	0
VPI		–		6	–	1	–	0
Florida		–		6	–	1	–	1
Elon		–		4	–	1	–	0
Louisiana Industrial		–		4	–	1	–	0
Spring Hill		–		4	–	1	–	0
Catholic University		–		0	–	1	–	1
North Carolina		–		5	–	2	–	0
Birmingham		–		4	–	2	–	0
Kendall		–		2	–	1	–	0
Southwestern Louisiana Industrial		–		5	–	2	–	2
Marshall		–		3	–	2	–	1
VMI		–		4	–	3	–	0
Navy		–		4	–	3	–	1
Texas		–		4	–	3	–	1
Tulane		–		4	–	3	–	2
West Virginia		–		4	–	3	–	2
Washington and Lee		–		4	–	3	–	0
Oklahoma		–		6	–	4	–	0
Georgetown		–		3	–	2	–	1
Oklahoma A&M		–		5	–	3	–	0
Davidson		–		3	–	4	–	2
George Washington		–		3	–	4	–	1
Chattanooga		–		2	–	3	–	2
Wake Forest		–		2	–	4	–	0
Maryland		–		2	–	5	–	0
South Carolina		–		2	–	6	–	0
Delaware		–		1	–	6	–	1

1909 Western college football independents records
	Conf.			Overall
Team	W	L	T	W		L		T
St. Vincent's		–		6	–	0	–	0
Montana		–		6	–	0	–	1
Utah		–		4	–	1	–	0
Denver		–		7	–	2	–	0
Arizona		–		3	–	1	–	0
New Mexico		–		4	–	2	–	0
USC		–		3	–	1	–	2
Hawaii		–		2	–	2	–	0
Utah Agricultural		–		2	–	2	–	1
Wyoming		–		3	–	5	–	0
New Mexico A&M		–		1	–	3	–	1

=== Minor conferences ===
Conference	Champion(s)	Record
Kansas Collegiate Athletic Conference	Kansas State Agricultural	5–0
Michigan Intercollegiate Athletic Association	Olivet	4–0
Ohio Athletic Conference	Oberlin	4–0–1

=== Minor conference standings ===
1909 Colorado Faculty Athletic Conference football standings
	Conf.					Overall
Team	W		L		T	W		L		T
Colorado $	3	–	0	–	0	6	–	0	–	0
Colorado College	2	–	1	–	0	5	–	2	–	0
Colorado Mines	0	–	2	–	0	3	–	3	–	0
Colorado Agricultural	0	–	2	–	0	1	–	2	–	0
$ – Conference champion

1909 Eastern Virginia Intercollegiate Athletic Association football standings
	Conf.					Overall
Team	W		L		T	W		L		T
William & Mary	2	–	1	–	0	6	–	4	–	0
Randolph–Macon	2	–	1	–	0	3	–	2	–	2
Richmond	1	–	2	–	0	3	–	5	–	2
Hampden–Sydney	1	–	2	–	0	3	–	5	–	0

1909 Ohio Athletic Conference football standings
	Conf.					Overall
Team	W		L		T	W		L		T
Oberlin $	4	–	0	–	1	5	–	1	–	1
Case	5	–	0	–	2	6	–	1	–	2
Ohio State	5	–	2	–	0	7	–	3	–	0
Western Reserve	2	–	1	–	1	5	–	3	–	1
Kenyon	4	–	4	–	0	6	–	4	–	0
Denison	3	–	3	–	0	4	–	5	–	1
Ohio Wesleyan	2	–	4	–	0	5	–	4	–	0
Wittenberg	1	–	3	–	0	3	–	6	–	0
Wooster	1	–	5	–	0	1	–	6	–	0
Heidelberg	0	–	5	–	0	0	–	8	–	1
$ – Conference champion

== Awards and honors ==
=== All-Americans ===
The consensus All-America team included Walter Camp's selections:

Position	Name	Height	Weight (lbs.)	Class	Hometown	Team
QB	John McGovern	5'9"	155	Sr.	Arlington, Minnesota	Minnesota
HB	Stephen Philbin					Yale
HB	Wayland Minot				Cambridge, Massachusetts	Harvard
FB	Ted Coy	6'0"	195	Sr.	Andover, Massachusetts	Yale
E	Adrian Regnier					Brown
T	Hamilton Fish	6'4"	200	Sr.	Southboro, Massachusetts	Harvard
G	Albert Benbrook		240	Jr.	Chicago, Illinois	Michigan
C	Carroll Cooney			Sr.		Yale
G	Hamlin Andrus				Yonkers, New York	Yale
T	Henry Hobbs			Sr.		Yale
E	John Kilpatrick					Yale

== Statistical leaders ==
- Rushing yards leader: Jim Thorpe, Carlisle, 781
