= 1909 VPI football team =

American college football team

1909 VPI football
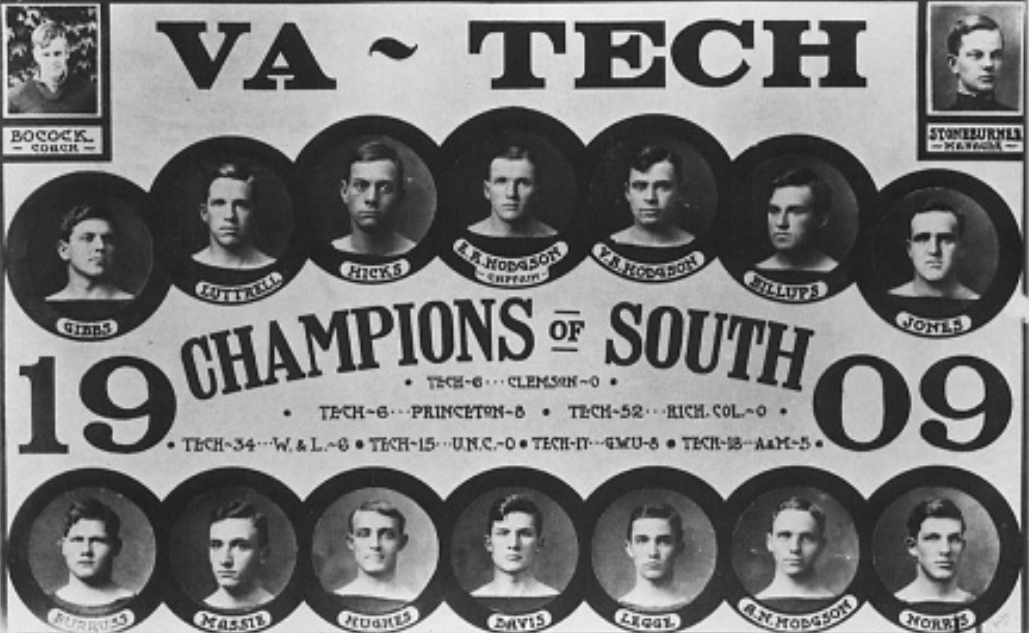

Southern champion
- Conference: Independent
- Record: 6–1
- Head coach: Branch Bocock (1st season)
- Captain: Hoss Hodgson
- Home stadium: Miles Field

1909 South Atlantic Intercollegiate Athletic Association football standings
	Conf.					Overall
Team	W		L		T	W		L		T
VPI +	4	–	0	–	0	6	–	1	–	0
Virginia +	3	–	0	–	0	7	–	1	–	0
George Washington	1	–	1	–	0	1	–	3	–	0
William & Mary	1	–	1	–	0	6	–	4	–	0
Georgetown	1	–	2	–	0	3	–	2	–	0
Richmond	1	–	4	–	0	3	–	5	–	2
Davidson	0	–	1	–	0	3	–	4	–	2
+ – Conference co-champions

The 1909 VPI football team represented the Virginia Agricultural and Mechanical College and Polytechnic Institute in the 1909 college football season. Led by first-year head coach Branch Bocock, the team went 6–1 and claims a Southern championship. Tech outscored its opponents 148 to 27. The starting lineup averaged 172 pounds. This is the first season the team was referred to in print as the "Gobblers", and it became the official nickname in 1912.

== Schedule ==
Date	Time	Opponent	Site	Result	Attendance	Source
October 2		Clemson	Miles Field; Blacksburg, VA	W 6–0		
October 13		at Princeton	University Field; Princeton, NJ	L 6–8		
October 23		at Richmond	Broad Street Park; Richmond, VA	W 52–0	1,500	
October 30		vs. Washington and Lee	Lynchburg, VA	W 34–6	2,200	
November 6	3:30 p.m.	vs. North Carolina	Broad Street Park; Richmond, VA	W 15–0	2,000	
November 12		at George Washington	American League Park; Washington, DC	W 17–8		
November 25	2:30 p.m.	vs. North Carolina A&M	Athletic Park; Norfolk, VA	W 18–5	10,000	

== Before the season ==
The 1908 VPI football team compiled a 5–4 record and were led by R. M. Brown in his only season as head coach.

== Game summaries ==
=== Clemson ===
Clemson at VPI

Team	1	2	Total
Clemson	0	0	0
• VPI	6	0	6

- Date: October 6
- Location: Miles Field
  Blacksburg, VA
- Referee: Frank Shaughnessy

VPI opened its season with the Clemson Tigers, winning 6–0. "Hughes, playing quarter for the first time, starred for V. P. I." Hughes got the touchdown when he picked up a fumble.

The starting lineup for VPI was: Sharpe (left end), Jones (left tackle), H. Hodgson (left guard), Gibbs (center), Burruss (right guard), Norris (right tackle), Hicks (right end), Hughes (quarterback), Davis (left halfback), Luttrell (right halfback), Legge (fullback).

The starting lineup for Clemson was: J. A. Bates (left end), Handy (left tackle), J. T. Cochran (left guard), F. V. Gilmer (center), Onan Hydrick (right guard), David Britt (right tackle), W. H. Hanckle (right end), W. R. Connelly (quarterback), Walter White (left halfback), R. H. Walker (right halfback), Charles Robbs (fullback).

=== Princeton ===
VPI at Princeton

Team	1	2	Total
VPI	6	0	6
• Princeton	5	3	8

- Date: October 13
- Location: University Field
  Princeton, NJ
- Game weather: Frigid
- Referee: Joe Pendleton (Bowdoin)

VPI's strongest showing came in the close loss to Ivy League powerhouse Princeton. In a game plagued by frigid weather conditions, each side scored due to a fumble by the opposition. Princeton's Logan Cunningham scored a touchdown (worth five points in 1909) in the first two minutes of play after VPI fumbled the ball away on its own 10-yard line. Princeton missed the extra point attempt. Later in the contest, a snap from center went over the Princeton quarterback's head, and Tech’s Hoss Hodgson returned the lost fumble 50 yards for a touchdown. Hodgson then made his own extra point. After VPI led 6 to 5 for some time, and with only minutes left to play, Princeton's Cunningham made 30-yard drop kick to secure the 8 to 6 victory.

The starting lineup for VPI was: Luttrell (left end), Burruss (left tackle), Jones (left guard), Gibbs (center), H. Hodgson (right guard), Norris (right tackle), Hicks (right end), Hughes (quarterback), Davis (left halfback), Billups (right halfback), V. Hodgson (fullback). The substitutes were: Legge.

The starting lineup for Princeton was: R. R. Meigs (left end), Rudolph Siegling (left tackle), I. M. Woehr (left guard), F. C. Bamman (center), P. E. Waller (right guard), John McCrohan (right tackle), H. E. Gill (right end), P. P. Chrystie (quarterback), Logan Cunningham (left halfback), W. R. Sparks (right halfback), Fred Dawson (fullback). The substitutes were: G. H. Garrett, P. M. King, A. McGregor, J. C. Musser, E. Norman and H. M. Sawyer.

=== Richmond ===
VPI at Richmond

Team	1	2	Total
• VPI	29	23	52
Richmond	0	0	0

- Date: October 23
- Location: Broad Street Park
  Richmond, VA
- Game attendance: 1,500
- Referee: Hammond Johnson

VPI rolled up the season's largest score on the Richmond Spiders, winning 52–0 and playing well on both sides of the ball, especially the offense. The backfield starred in a game of conventional football.

The starting lineup for VPI was: A. Hodgson (left end), Burruss (left tackle), Pitts (left guard), Gibbs (center), H. Hodgson (right guard), Norris (right tackle), Hicks (right end), Hughes (quarterback), Davis (left halfback), Billups (right halfback), V. Hodgson (fullback). The substitutes were: Austin, Cleaton, Jeffries, Legge and Luttrell.

The starting lineup for Richmond was: Henry Taylor (left end), Albert Hazlett (left tackle), George Sadler (left guard), Ewing Stringfellow (center), Jones (right guard), John Johnson (right tackle), Albert Ransone (right end), Smith (quarterback), Edward McFarland (left halfback), Sidney Sutherland (right halfback), Algienon Meredith (fullback). The substitutes were: Terry Durham and Miller.

=== Washington and Lee ===
VPI at Washington and Lee

Team	1	2	Total
• VPI	11	23	34
W&L	0	6	6

- Date: October 30
- Location: Lynchburg, VA
- Game attendance: 2,200
- Referee: Pat Barry (Georgetown)

VPI "buried" the Washington and Lee Generals by a 34–6 score. Hughes' 65-yard touchdown run and Hoss Hodgson's punting and kicking featured. Fullback Anderson starred for the Generals. The big win was surprising.

The starting lineup for VPI was: Luttrell (left end), Burruss (left tackle), Pitts (left guard), Gibbs (center), H. Hodgson (right guard), Norris (right tackle), Hicks (right end), Hughes (quarterback), Davis (left halfback), Billups (right halfback), V. Hodgson (fullback). The substitutes were: A. Hodgson, Jones and Legge.

The starting lineup for Washington and Lee was: I. R. Simms (left end), J. C. O'Quinn (left tackle), J. W. Bruce (left guard), Joseph Blackburn (center), William Pipes (right guard), Cleon Osbourn (right tackle), Henry Smartt (right end), John Izard (quarterback), William Barnard (left halfback), Edward Brown (right halfback), Edwin Alderson (fullback). The substitutes were: E. F. Burk, Hamilton Derr, Jasper Efird, Donaldson Earwood, Richard Morales and L. W. Wilson.

=== North Carolina ===
North Carolina at VPI

Team	1	2	Total
UNC	0	0	0
• VPI	6	9	15

- Date: November 6
- Location: Broad Street Park
  Richmond, VA
- Game start: 3:30 p. m.
- Game attendance: 2,000
- Referee: Pat Barry (Georgetown)

Hodgson starred in a closely contested game between VPI and the Tar Heels, making a field goal in the second half to lead VPI to a 15–0 win.

The starting lineup for VPI was: Luttrell (left end), Burruss (left tackle), Jones (left guard), Gibbs (center), H. Hodgson (right guard), Norris (right tackle), Hicks (right end), Hughes (quarterback), Legge (left halfback), A. Hodgson (right halfback), V. Hodgson (fullback). The substitutes were: Davis, Massey and Pitts.

The starting lineup for North Carolina was: Bob Winston (left end), Cecil Garrett (left tackle), Robert McLean (left guard), Levi Brown (center), Earl Thompson (right guard), Harry Hedgepath (right tackle), Richard Williams (right end), John Tillett (quarterback), Andrew Porter (left halfback), Louis Belden (right halfback), Elder (fullback). The substitutes were: Will Belk, Roswell, Carl Spainhour and John Venable.

=== George Washington ===
VPI at George Washington

Team	1	2	Total
• VPI	11	6	17
GW	3	5	8

- Date: November 12
- Location: Washington, D. C.
- Referee: Jack Gass

VPI won over the defending Southern champion George Washington Hatchetites in Washington, D. C. 17–8. Hodgson's punting again featured. The weather was much better than last year.

The starting lineup for VPI was: Luttrell (left end), Burruss (left tackle), H. Hodgson (left guard), Gibbs (center), Jones (right guard), Norris (right tackle), Hicks (right end), Hughes (quarterback), Davis (left halfback), Billups (right halfback), V. Hodgson (fullback). The substitutes were: Graveley, Legge and Massie.

The starting lineup for George Washington was: Powell (left end), Wayne Hart (left tackle), Robert Fowler (left guard), M. W. Brandt (center), Theodore Eickhoff (right guard), George Bullough (right tackle), R. E. Whiting (right end), Irwin Porter (quarterback), Bayliss (left halfback), H. Ellis (right halfback), Matthew Farmer (fullback). The substitutes were: Royal Alston, Frederick Crafts, Bryan Morse and Herbert White.

=== North Carolina A&M ===
North Carolina A&M at VPI

Team	1	2	Total
N.C. A&M	0	5	5
• VPI	12	6	18

- Date: November 25
- Location: Athletic Park
  Norfolk, VA
- Game start: 2:30 p. m.
- Game attendance: 10,000
- Referee: Myers (Harvard)

VPI defeated the North Carolina Aggies, (now known as N.C. State) 18–5. Despite the 18–5 score, VPI had to play aggressively throughout. The first score came twelve minutes into the first half, Vivian Hodgson going over. Later, on a fake kick, Luttrell ran 30 yards around left end. The A&M squad followed Hoss Hodgson's helmet, which he tossed as if it were a kicked ball.

The last touchdown came on a new trick play from coach Bocock, apparently similar to a statue of liberty play. Vivian Hodgson prepared to pass, and Hughes took it out of his suspended hand and ran 75 yards for a touchdown. North Carolina's Aggies showed fight in the second half.

The starting lineup for VPI was: Luttrell (left end), Burruss (left tackle), Massie (left guard), Gibbs (center), H. Hodgson (right guard), Norris (right tackle), Hicks (right end), Hughes (quarterback), A. Hodgson (left halfback), Billups (right halfback), V. Hodgson (fullback). The substitutes were: Cleaton, Davis and Legge.

The starting lineup for North Carolina A&M was: Tal Stafford (left end), J. L. Von Glahn (left tackle), Harry Mott (left guard), John Bray (center), D. B. Floyd (right guard), James Dunn (right tackle), David Seifert (right end), Samuel Stephens (quarterback), G. C. Glenn (left halfback), Harry Hartsell (right halfback), Ralph Long (fullback). The substitutes were: Mark Lassiter.

== Postseason ==
VPI claimed a Southern championship at year's end.

== Players ==
The following players were members of the 1909 football team according to the roster published in the 1910 edition of The Bugle, the Virginia Tech yearbook.

VPI 1909 roster
Quarterback: John Leyburn Hughes; Guards: Hoss Hodgson (Capt.); Harry Guilford Jones; Tackles: William Henry Burruss; Edward Raymond Norris; Center: Aubrey Gravatt Gibbs	Ends: Thomas Paret Hicks; Joseph Talmage Luttrell; Halfbacks: Henry Evans Billups; Asbury Nathaniel Hodgson; Fullback: Vivian Burnett Hodgson	Substitutes: Austin; Marvin Luther Cleaton; Winston Bozel Davis; William Seymour Gravely; McChesney Hill Jeffries; Frederick Hughes Legge; Caesar Pancratius Massei; Pitts; Sharp

== Coaching and training staff ==
- Head coach: Branch Bocock
- Manager: Frank Curtis Stoneburner
