= 1909 Cheney Normal football team =

American college football season

1909 Cheney Normal football
- Conference: Independent
- Record: 0–2
- Head coach: Harry Goldsworthy (1st season)

1909 Western college football independents records
	Conf.			Overall
Team	W	L	T	W		L		T
St. Vincent's		–		6	–	0	–	0
Montana		–		6	–	0	–	1
Utah		–		4	–	1	–	0
Denver		–		7	–	2	–	0
Arizona		–		3	–	1	–	0
New Mexico		–		4	–	2	–	0
USC		–		3	–	1	–	2
Hawaii		–		2	–	2	–	0
Utah Agricultural		–		2	–	2	–	1
Wyoming		–		3	–	5	–	0
New Mexico A&M		–		1	–	3	–	1
Cheney Normal		–		0	–	2	–	0
Montana Agricultural		–		0	–	6	–	1

The 1909 Cheney Normal football team represented the State Normal School at Cheney—now known as Eastern Washington University—as an independent during the 1909 college football season. Led by Harry Goldsworthy in his first and only season as head coach, Cheney Normal compiled a record of 0–2.

== Schedule ==
Date	Time	Opponent	Site	Result	Source
October 9		at Gonzaga	Spokane, WA	L 0–17	
October 16		Blair Business	Cheney, WA	L 0–18	
November 6	2:30 p.m.	at Blair Business	Natatorium Park; Spokane, WA		
All times are in Pacific time; Source:
