= McBirney =

McBirney is a surname. Notable people with the surname include:

- James H. McBirney (1870–1944), American banker
- Martin McBirney (1922–1974), Northern Irish judge and politician
- Nettie McBirney (1887–1982), American inventor and writer
- Sam P. McBirney (1877–1936), American football coach and banker
