= Goldsworthy (name) =

Goldsworthy is a Cornish name, from the Cornish language "gol-erewy", meaning field of feast. Notable people with the name include:

Surname:

- Adrian Goldsworthy (born 1969), British historian
- Andy Goldsworthy (born 1956), British artist
- Anna Goldsworthy (born 1974), Australian pianist and writer, daughter of Peter Goldsworthy
- Bill Goldsworthy (1944–1996), Canadian ice hockey player
- Burrington Goldsworthy (c. 1705 – 1774), 18th century English Consul at Leghorn and later Cadiz; father of Philip Goldsworthy
- Clifford R. Goldsworthy (1865–1944), American politician
- Denise Goldsworthy (born 1964/1965), Australian business executive
- Harry E. Goldsworthy (1914–2022), American Air Force lieutenant general
- John Goldsworthy (1884–1958), British actor
- Julia Goldsworthy (born 1978), British politician
- Kay Goldsworthy (born 1956), Australian Anglican bishop
- Kerryn Goldsworthy (born 1953), Australian writer
- Peter Goldsworthy (born 1951), Australian author, father of Anna Goldsworthy
- Philip Goldsworthy (c. 1737 – 1801), General, Colonel of The Royals, Chief Equerry to King George III
- Robert F. Goldsworthy (1917–2014), American politician
- Roger Goldsworthy (colonial administrator) (1839–1900), President of Nevis; Governor of Saint Lucia; Governor of the British Honduras; and Governor of the Falkland Islands
- Samuel Goldsworthy (1855–1889), Wales international rugby player
- Vesna Goldsworthy (born c. 1961), Serbian writer
- Walter Tuckfield Goldsworthy (1837–1911), British Army officer and Conservative Party politician
- W. Brandt Goldsworthy, the pioneer of pultrusion

Given name:

- Goldsworthy Gurney (1793–1875), surgeon, chemist, lecturer, consultant, architect, builder and British gentleman scientist and inventor
- Goldsworthy Lowes Dickinson (1862–1932), Historian and political activist

Fictional characters:

- Eli Goldsworthy, character in Degrassi
