= Harry Goldsworthy =

Harry Goldsworthy may refer to:

- Harry Goldsworthy (American football) (1883–1970), American college football player and coach, state legislator, and farmer
- Harry E. Goldsworthy (1914–2022), American Air Force general, son of the former
