= Goldsworthy =

Goldsworthy may refer to:

== Places ==
- Goldsworthy, Western Australia, a former mining town in the Shire of East Pilbara, Australia
- Goldsworthy Ridge, a ridge extending north from Mount Henderson in Mac. Robertson Land, Antarctica
- Goldsworthy, Gwennap, Cornwall, United Kingdom
- Goldsworthy, Crowan, Cornwall, United Kingdom

== Other uses ==
- Goldsworthy (name)
- Goldsworthy Productions, Australian production company established by actor Reg Goldsworthy
- Goldsworthy railway line, iron ore railway line in Australia
