= Piano Lessons (disambiguation) =

Piano lessons are what a person takes to learn how to play the piano.

Piano Lessons may also refer to:

- Piano Lessons (book), a 2009 non-fiction book by Anna Goldsworthy
- Piano Lessons (TV series), a 1931 American television series
- "Piano Lessons" (song), a song by Porcupine Tree
