= State Theatre Company of South Australia =

Theatre company in South Australia

The State Theatre Company of South Australia (STCSA), branded State Theatre Company South Australia, formerly the South Australian Theatre Company (SATC), is South Australia's leading professional theatre company, and a statutory corporation. It was established as the official state theatre company by the State Theatre Company of South Australia Act 1972, on the initiative of Premier Don Dunstan.

Many of the performances are staged at the Dunstan Playhouse and Space Theatre at the Adelaide Festival Centre. As of November 2024 the artistic director and co-CEO is Petra Kalive. Notable actors, writers and directors working with the company have included Patrick White, Neil Armfield, Ruth Cracknell, Andrew Bovell, Judy Davis, Gale Edwards, Mel Gibson, Geoffrey Rush, Jim Sharman, Hugo Weaving, Elena Carapetis and John Wood.

== History ==
The South Australian Theatre Company (SATC) was established in 1965 under the artistic direction of John Tasker. Tasker directed 10 plays before clashing with the board and leaving in 1967. Actor Leslie Dayman took over from Tasker and Peter Batey followed Dayman.

The date of establishment as the state theatre company dates from the State Theatre Company of South Australia Act of 1972, an initiative of then Premier Dunstan. The name of the company was changed to its current name in 1978 (Note: Although as of 2 August 2019, the About page, History section, cites 1980 as the date of the name change, quoting a 2004 work, the State Library of South Australia catalogue shows several works attributed to the STCSA name from 1978, and notes here that the entity "appears to be operating under State Theatre Company name from August 1978".) as a reflection of this act. The director of the company in its inaugural year was George Ogilvie.

In 1974, the SATC became the inaugural resident theatre company of the Adelaide Festival Centre, performing mostly in The Playhouse (later The Dunstan Playhouse and still the company's primary venue), and was the first state theatre company in Australia to hold its entire operations in one purpose-made building.

In 1977, Magpie Theatre was established as a theatre in education (TIE) branch of STCSA, for young people. After 20 years and numerous productions, it was terminated in 1997, partially due to loss of funding after reconstruction of Arts SA.

Under the artistic direction of Jim Sharman, the company was renamed Lighthouse from 1982 to 1983, operating as an ensemble theatre company with twelve actors: Robynne Bourne, Peter Cummins, Melissa Jaffer (replaced in 1983 by Jacqy Phillips), Alan John, Gillian Jones, Melita Jurisic, Russell Kiefel, Stuart McCreery, Robert Menzies (replaced by Robert Grubb), Geoffrey Rush, Kerry Walker and John Wood.

The company was subtitled Australian Playhouse from 1996 to 1997 during the tenure of Chris Westwood, the company's first female executive producer, appointed in 1993. She aimed at presenting only Australian works until the end of the century; however, she resigned at the end of 1997.

The board reported to Arts SA (later Arts South Australia) from 1993 until 2018, when it started reporting directly to the Department of the Premier and Cabinet.

From 2019 the company was branded "State Theatre Company South Australia", but official reports still refers to the legal name of "State Theatre Company of South Australia". In the same year, Mitchell Butel was appointed artistic director of the company.

In August 2024, Butel announced that he would be leaving STCSA to take up the role of artistic director of Sydney Theatre Company. In November 2024, it was announced that Petra Kalive had been appointed as the new artistic director, as well as co-CEO, joining executive director Julian Hobba in the CEO role. Kalive was formerly associate director at Melbourne Theatre Company and artistic director of the University of Melbourne's Union House Theatre, and has also held leadership roles at Melbourne Playback Theatre and La Mama.

In June 2025, it was announced that Julian Hobba was leaving the co-CEO role after five years at the company, to become executive director of the Adelaide Festival from September.

== Venues ==
As of 2021, the company's administration offices are based at the Lion Arts Centre, on the corner of Morphett Street and North Terrace, Adelaide. The company's main venue is the Dunstan Playhouse, but it also uses the Space Theatre, the Royalty Theatre in Angas Street, and the Thomas Edmonds Opera Studio at the Adelaide Showground. It holds its "Tangent" talks in the Hawke Building at University of South Australia's City West campus.

== Awards for new work ==
The company supports new work through its annual Flinders University Young Playwrights' Awards for writers under 25, offering dramaturgy and a professional reading to the winning scripts in junior (13–17) and senior (18–25) sections.

It also presents the Jill Blewett Playwright's Award, worth $12,500, awarded for an as yet unproduced play of any genre written by a professional South Australian playwright. It is presented at Adelaide Writer's Week during the Adelaide Festival.

== People ==
=== Directors ===
- John Tasker (1965–67)
- Leslie Dayman (1968–69)
- Peter Batey (1970–71)
- George Ogilvie (1972–1976)
- Colin George (1977–1979)
- Kevin Palmer (artistic director), Nick Enright (associate director) (1980–81)
- Jim Sharman (artistic director), Neil Armfield and Louis Nowra (associates) (1982–83) (as Lighthouse)
- Keith Gallasch (1984–85)
- John Gaden (director), Gale Edwards (associate) (1986–89)
- Simon Phillips (1990–93)
- Chris Westwood (executive producer) (1994–97)
- Rodney Fisher (1998–99)
- Rosalba Clemente (2000–04)
- Adam Cook (2005–2012)
- Geordie Brookman (2013–2018)
- Mitchell Butel (2019–November 2024)
- Petra Kalive (from end November 2024); also co-executive director with Julian Hobba until June 2025; then with Kath Fyffe from October 2025

=== Associate Directors ===
- Rosalba Clemente (1997-1999)
- Chris Drummond (2001-2004)
- Michael Hill (2006–2008)
- Geordie Brookman (2008–2010)
- Catherine Fitzgerald (2011–2012)
- Nescha Jelk (2013–2016)
- Elena Carapetis (2017–2019)
- Anthony Nicola (2020–2022)
- Shannon Rush (2023–present)

== Actors ==
Notable actors who have performed as part of the STCSA ensemble include Mark Saturno, James Smith, Nathan O'Keefe, Rachel Burke, Rashidi Edwards, Anna Steen, Miranda Daughtry, and Dale March.

== New works ==
Shows which have been commissioned by State Theatre Company South Australia include:

- 2023 – The Dictionary of Lost Words adapted by Verity Laughton from the novel by Pip Williams
- 2023 – Welcome To Your New Life by Anna Goldsworthy
- 2022 – Cathedral by Caleb Lewis
- 2022 – Antigone by Elena Carapetis
- 2021 – The Boy Who Talked To Dogs by Amy Conroy (co-production with Slingsby)
- 2021 – Euphoria by Emily Steel (co-production with Country Arts SA)
- 2021 – Hibernation by Finegan Kruckemeyer
- 2020 – Decameron 2.0 (co-production with Actnow Theatre)
- 2018 – In The Club by Patricia Cornelius
- 2018 – Terrestrial by Fleur Kilpatrick
- 2018 – The Gods of Strangers by Elena Carapetis
- 2016 – Gorgon by Elena Carapetis
- 2016 – Things I Know To Be True by Andrew Bovell (co-production with UK's Frantic Assembly)
- 2014 – Jesikah by Phillip Kavanagh
- 2014 – Little Bird by Nicki Bloom
- 2013 – The Kreutzer Sonata by Sue Smith
- 2013 – Maggie Stone by Caleb Lewis
- 2009 – Metro Street by Matthew Robinson
- 2009 – Maestro by Anna Goldsworthy and Peter Goldsworthy
- 2008 – Architektin by Robyn Archer
- 2008 – When The Rain Stops Falling by Andrew Bovell (co-presentation with Brink Productions)
- 2007 – Lion Pig Lion by Marty Denniss
- 2006 – Honk If You Are Jesus by Peter Goldsworthy and Martin Laud Gray (winner of the 2006 Ruby Award for Best New Work or Event)
- 2004 – Euripides' Trojan Women adapted by Rosalba Clemente and Dawn Langman
- 2004 – Night Letters by Robert Dessaix adapted by Susan Rogers and Chris Drummond
- 2003 – drowning in my ocean of You by Fiona Sprott
- 2002 – My Life, My Love by Pat Rix
- 2001 – Holy Day by Andrew Bovell (winner of 2 Green Room Awards)
- 1986 – Dreams In An Empty City by Stephen Sewell
- 1985 – Beautland by Barry Dickins
- 1983 – Sunrise by Louis Nowra
- 1983 – The Blind Giant Is Dancing by Stephen Sewell
- 1983 – Netherwood by Patrick White
- 1982 – Spellbound by Louis Nowra
- 1982 – Royal Show by Louis Nowra
- 1982 – Signal Driver: A Morality Play for the Times by Patrick White
- 1978 – A Manual of Trench Warfare by Clem Gorman
- 1978 – Marx by Ron Blair
- 1976 – A Handful of Friends by David Williamson
- 1974 – The Department by David Williamson

== See also ==
- Geoff Cobham, lighting designer 2012–2018
