= Robert Trimble (disambiguation) =

Robert Trimble (1776–1828) was an American lawyer and jurist.

Robert Trimble may also refer to:

- Robert Trimble (politician) (1824–1899), Irish-born New Zealand politician and judge
- Robert F. Trimble (1924–2024), United States Air Force major general
- SS Robert Trimble, a Liberty ship built in the United States
