= McBirney Mansion (Tulsa, Oklahoma) =

Historic house in Oklahoma, United States

- U.S. National Register of Historic Places
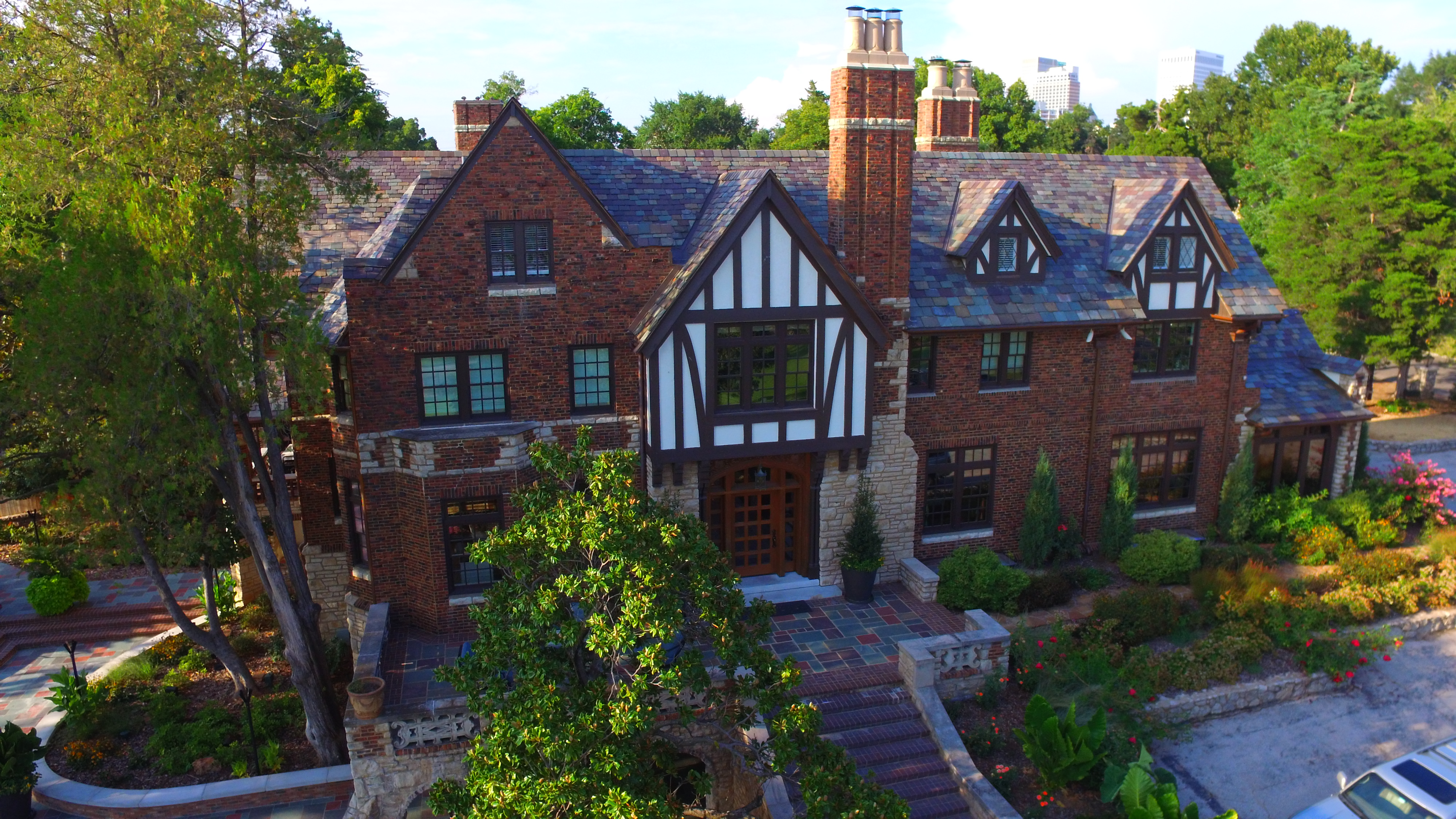

- Location within Oklahoma Location within the United States
- Location: 1414 S. Galveston; Tulsa, Oklahoma
- Coordinates: 36°8′30″N 95°59′52″W
- Area: 3.5 acres (1.4 ha)
- Built: 1927
- Architect: John Long
- Architectural style: Gothic Revival
- NRHP reference No.: 76001577
- Added to NRHP: November 13, 1976

The McBirney Mansion is a residence in Tulsa, Oklahoma, and was the home of James H. McBirney, co-founder of the Bank of Commerce in Tulsa in 1904. (Note: The bank was renamed National Bank of Commerce in 1935, reflecting its change from a state charter to a Federal charter.) He was the original owner of the mansion, built by architect John Long in 1928, and lived there until 1976. The mansion contained 15,900 square feet (1,480 m^{2}) and sits on a 2.91 acres (11,800 m^{2}) lot.

The mansion was bought by Donna and Roger Hardesty who lived there for 5 years. Eventually it was bought by a law firm that turned it into a law office. By 2007, was purchased by former American Airlines President George Warde, who had plans to transform it into a boutique hotel. In the meantime, the McBirney Mansion was used as an event center. Warde died in 2012, and events stopped being held at McBirney. By February 2012, the Pauls Corporation, a Denver real estate management company, acquired the mansion as part of the suit's [what suit?] settlement. Tulsa attorney Gentner Drummond bought the mansion from Pauls Corp. in 2014, announcing his intention to make it his family's home.

== Description ==
The Gothic Revival mansion was designed for James McBirney by John Long, a Kansas City architect. Its site was in Childer's Heights, a residential area located near the Arkansas River, south of downtown Tulsa. The site is at 1414 South Galveston Avenue. Its coordinates are latitude 36.14171 and longitude -95.99183.

Childers Heights Addition is now a part of the Riverside Historical District. This land had been allotted to Wiliam Childers, a member of the Creek tribe, in 1905, when the tribal lands were allotted to individual members of the tribe. In 1918, after Childers' death, his daughter, Nola Childers Tracy, prepared plats for developing the 160 acres (65 ha) that she had inherited from her father.

The house has four levels and is constructed with a steel beam frame under hollow tile. The exterior is covered with brick, stucco and stone. It is decorated with copper gutters and stained glass windows. The foundation is 18 inches (460 mm) thick reinforced concrete. A separate two-level building contains a four-car garage plus quarters. The basement has a separate entrance at ground level and includes a club room with a fireplace, a billiard room with billiard table, furnace room, two storage rooms and a general purpose room. There is also a laundry and a half bath.

The first floor (ground level) has a large foyer, which opens onto a slate-floored terrace. All first floor rooms, except the breakfast area, open onto the terrace, which has a view of the Arkansas River. Rooms on the first floor include a Living room (24 feet (7.3 m) by 51 feet (16 m)), dining room (31 feet (9.4 m)), music room (25 feet (7.6 m) by 19 feet (5.8 m)), kitchen and butler's pantry. There are also two porches. The second floor contains seven bedrooms and three full bathrooms. The third floor has three dormer bedrooms and one full bathroom.

The grounds surrounding the mansion are landscaped with trees, especially magnolias and cedars. The ground at the rear slope toward the Arkansas River. This area also features a rock garden, a grotto and a fresh water spring that has its own historical importance. The spring (now known as "McBirney Spring") is fed by an underground source that has surfaced here since before the Creek Nation stopped in the Tulsa area after their forced emigration. It is said that Washington Irving stopped here in 1832 and subsequently wrote about the spring. The spring was also used by early cattlemen to water their stock before fording the Arkansas River.

== Conversion to other uses ==
In 1975, the home was sold by the McBirney family to a local couple, Roger and Donna Hardesty. The Hardestys then sold it to the Doyle, Holmes, Gasaway and Green law firm, who converted it to their office.

In the mid 90s, the mansion was affiliated with Tulsa Regional Medical Center, in conjunction with The Rader Institute, an inpatient treatment center for eating disorders. By 1999, McBirney Mansion was a bed and breakfast which hosted wedding venues as well.

In January, 2007, three men, doing business as WSL Properties LLC, announced plans to buy the McBirney Mansion and convert it to an 80-suite luxury hotel encompassing 112,000 square feet (10,400 m^{2}). The three investors were George Warde, Jim Seawright and Jack Lee. The announcement said they expected to spend $23 million to convert the facility from a bed and breakfast to a hotel, including adding a 100,000 square feet (9,300 m^{2}), an underground garage and a meeting facility. The seller was McBirney Asset Management Inc. dba Caroline Cardin, and the price was listed at $2.2 million.

Gentner Drummond, a Tulsa attorney, bought the mansion from Pauls Corporation in 2014 for $2.03 million. He and his wife intended to make it their family home. Although the house was in excellent shape, they immediately began to replace some of the kitchen appliances. As of 2025, it remains a private residence and is now on sale.

== NRHP listing ==
The McBirney House was listed on the National Register of Historic Places (NRHP) by the National Park Service on November 13, 1976, under criteria B and C. The registration number is 76001577.
