= Brink Productions =

Australian theatre company based in Adelaide

Brink Productions is an Australian theatre company based in Adelaide, South Australia, specialising in the ensemble-development of new writing. Founded in 1996, its productions have toured interstate, and as of 2024 the company continues to produce stage performances in Adelaide and regional South Australia. Stephen Nicolazzo has been artistic director since April 2024.

== History ==
Brink Productions was established in 1996 as a collective of seven actors, primarily graduates from the drama school of Flinders University, in order to "improve artistic production" in Australian theatre. Brink's founding members were Michaela Cantwell, Michaela Coventry, Lizzy Falkland, Victoria Hill, Richard Kelly, David Mealor, John Molloy, and Paul Moore, joined soon after by director Benedict Andrews. Director Chris Drummond was appointed artistic director in 2004.

One of Brink's most successful collaborations was When The Rain Stops Falling, written by Andrew Bovell with designs by visual artist Hossein Valamanesh and music by Quentin Grant. During 2008-2010 the Brink cast performed the play to over 60,000 people in Adelaide (2008, 2010), Sydney Theatre Company (2009), Melbourne Theatre Company (2009), Queensland Theatre Company (2010), Canberra Theatre Centre (2010) and the Araluen Arts Centre, Alice Springs (2010). The script has been performed all over the world including seasons at the Almeida Theatre in London and the Lincoln Center in New York City.

In 2016–17, Brink worked in association with Far & Away Productions to produce Ancient Rain, created with songwriter Paul Kelly, singer Camille O'Sullivan and musician Feargal Murray. The theatrical song cycle featured the poems of Seamus Heaney, James Joyce, Patrick Kavanagh, Paula Meehan, Padraic Pearse and W. B. Yeats and was presented at the 2016 Dublin Theatre Festival, 2016 Melbourne Festival, Canberra Theatre Centre, Merrigoing Theatre, 2017 Dark Mofo, QPAC and the 2017 Adelaide Cabaret Festival.

In 2018, Brink premiered Memorial at the 2018 Adelaide Festival, before touring it to the 2018 Brisbane Festival and the Barbican Centre. Memorial was a stage adaptation of Alice Oswald's Memorial: An Excavation of the Iliad, with music by Jocelyn Pook. Staged as a theatrical soliloquy performed by Helen Morse, it featured 200 chorus members

In 2018, the company toured The Aspirations of Daise Morrow to Canberra Theatre Centre, Merrigong Theatre, the 2018 Galway Festival and the Assembly Rooms at the 2018 Edinburgh Fringe. The Aspirations of Daise Morrow is Brink's adaptation of Patrick White's short story Down at the Dump, from The Burnt Ones.

Brink has worked with a broad array of other artists not mentioned above, including Roz Hervey, Benedict Andrews, Howard Barker, Paul Blackwell, Kate Box, Geordie Brookman, Paul Capsis, Lenny Grigoryan, and Slava Grigoryan. Its repertoire of work includes "epic narrative, re-imagined classics, music theatre, and children's theatre".

== People ==
Chris Drummond was artistic director of the company from 2004 until the end of July 2023, when he stepped down. He continued to work part-time on several projects during the recruitment process for a new AD.

In November 2023, Stephen Nicolazzo was appointed as artistic director, and became full-time in the role from April 2024 onwards.

== Awards ==
- 2018: Memorial Adelaide Critics Circle Award - Best Group
- 2017: Long Tan Curtain Call Award - Best Design
- 2015: The Aspirations of Daise Morrow Adelaide Critics Circle Award - Best Group
- 2013: Thursday Curtain Call Award - Best Ensemble
- 2011: Skip Miller's Hit Songs by Sean Riley Adelaide Fringe - John Chataway Digital Technology Award
- 2010: When the Rain Stops Falling by Andrew Bovell, a collaboration with Hossein Valamanesh & Brink Productions - ACT Green Room Award - Production
- 2009: The Hypochondriac by Molière, a new adaptation by Paul Galloway (Brink Productions, producer) - Adelaide Critics' Circle Award - Group Prize
- 2008: When the Rain Stops Falling, a collaboration with Hossein Valamanesh & Brink Productions, presented with the State Theatre Company of South Australia and the Adelaide Festival of Arts
  - Adelaide Critics' Circle Award – Group Prize (Brink Productions, producer);
  - Adelaide Critics' Circle Award – Individual Prize(Andrew Bovell, playwright;
  - Ruby Award - Best Work or Event;
  - Curtain Call Awards – Best Drama & Best Technical for Set Design/Video Design & Projection;
  - Victorian Premier's 2008 Literary Awards (Louis Esson Prize for Drama;
  - Queensland Premier's 2008 Literary Awards (Drama Script – Stage - Award;
  - Oscarts 2008 – Best of Everything;
- 2006: This Uncharted Hour by Finegan Kruckemeyer, co-production with the STCSA, presented in association with The Firm and the Adelaide Festival Centre's Inspace - ArtsSA: Jill Blewett Playwright's Award
- 2005: Drums in the Night by Bertolt Brecht, translated by Finegan Kruckemeyer, co-production with STCSA - Adelaide Theatre Guide Curtain Call Awards: Best Show, Drama
- 2001: Killer Joe by Tracy Letts -The Advertiser: Oscart for Best Production
- 2000: The Ecstatic Bible by Howard Barker, a co-production with The Wrestling School - Adelaide Critics' Circle: Excellence in Arts
- 1998: The Dumb Waiter by Harold Pinter -The Advertiser: Overall Artistic Excellence, Adelaide Fringe Festival
- 1998 Mojo The Advertiser: Overall Artistic Excellence, Adelaide Fringe Festival
- 1996: (Uncle) Vanya by Howard Barker -Adelaide Critics' Circle: Best Production
