= 1914 Kendall Orange and Black football team =

American college football season

1914 Kendall Orange and Black football
- Conference: Oklahoma Intercollegiate Conference
- Record: 6–2 (3–2 OIC)
- Head coach: Sam P. McBirney (2nd season)
- Home stadium: South Main Park

The 1914 Kendall Orange and Black football team represented Henry Kendall College (later renamed the University of Tulsa) during the 1914 college football season. Local businessmen urged Sam P. McBirney, who had coached the team in 1908, to take over as the football coach. Prior to 1913, the bulk of its games had been played against high school teams. From 1914 to 1916, McBirney built the Kendall football team into one of the best in the country. The 1914 team finished with a record of 6–2, outscored opponents 261 to 48, defeated Northwestern Oklahoma State (33–0), East Central (12–0), Pittsburg Normal (63–0), and Oklahoma Methodist (39–9), and played respectably against both Oklahoma A&M (a 13–6 loss) and Oklahoma (a 26–7 loss).

== Schedule ==
Date	Opponent	Site	Result	Source
October 3	Northwestern Oklahoma State	South Main Park; Tulsa, OK	W 33–0	
October 9	Tonkawa Tech*	South Main Park; Tulsa, OK	W 47–0	
October 16	at Oklahoma A&M	Lewis Field; Stillwater, OK (rivalry)	L 6–13	
October 23	at East Central	Ada, OK	W 12–0	
October 31	at Pittsburg Normal*	Pittsburg, KS	W 63–0	
November 6	at Claremore High School*	Claremore, OK	W 54–0	
November 13	at Oklahoma Methodist	Guthrie, OK	W 39–9	
November 30	Oklahoma	South Main Park; Tulsa, OK	L 7–26	
*Non-conference game
