= Robert F. Trimble =

United States Air Force major general

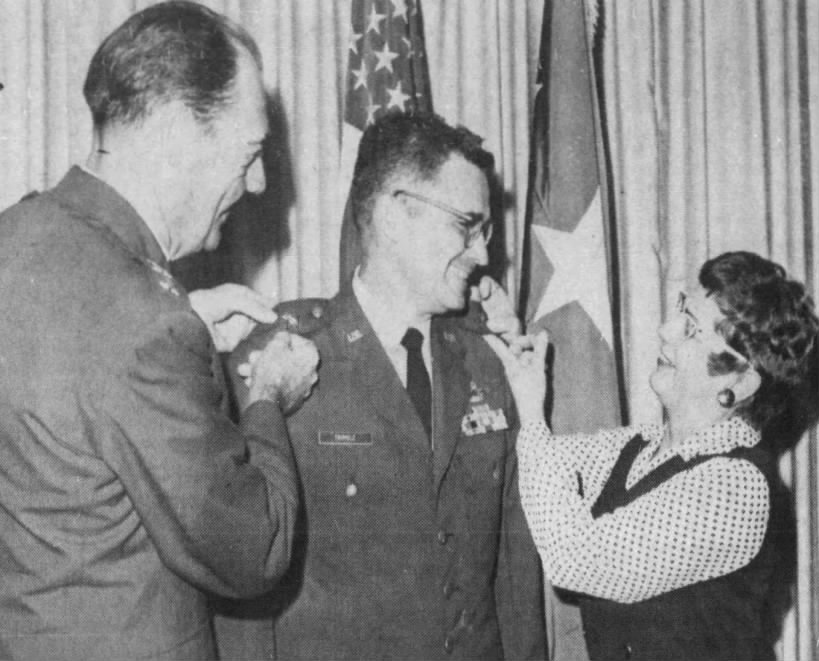
- Trimble (center) with Harry E. Goldsworthy and Trimble's wife, 1971
- Born: July 24, 1924; Boligee, Alabama, U.S.
- Died: March 8, 2024 (aged 99)
- Allegiance: United States of America
- Branch: United States Air Force
- Service years: 1945–1975
- Rank: Major general

Robert F. Trimble (July 24, 1924 – March 8, 2024) was a United States Air Force major general.

== Life and career ==
Trimble was born in Boligee, Alabama, the son of J. M. Trimble. He attended the University of Michigan, earning his master's degree in business administration in 1951.

In 1954, Trimble was an aircraft pilot and operations officer with the 58th Fighter Bomber Wing in Korea.

Trimble was director of procurement policy for the Air Force Headquarters during the 1970s.

On September 1, 1973, Trimble was promoted to the rank of major general. He retired in February 1975.

Trimble died on March 8, 2024, at the age of 99.
