= Maestro (novella) =

1989 novella by Peter Goldsworthy

- First edition
- Author: Peter Goldsworthy
- Cover artist: Michael Goldberg
- Language: English
- Genre: Bildungsroman
- Publisher: Angus & Robertson
- Publication date: 1989
- Publication place: Australia
- Pages: 149
- ISBN: 978-0-207-16289-3
- OCLC: 22273976
- Dewey Decimal: 823 20
- LC Class: PR9619.3.G58 M34 1989

Maestro is a 1989 novella written by Australian author Peter Goldsworthy. It is a bildungsroman novel dealing with themes of art and life. The book has been adapted as a stage play.

== Plot summary ==
The book is loosely based on Goldworthy's daughter Anna's piano lessons with Russian emigre pianist Eleonora Sivan (born 1941), who had moved to Adelaide in 1981 as a refugee.

The protagonist, a boy called Paul Crabbe, is taught piano by his teacher (or maestro), Eduard Keller. Paul dislikes his teacher at first, but by the end of the book has grown to appreciate him dearly. Paul slowly comes to realisation that he is now learning from the maestro, and his talent starts growing day by day. Paul learns the limits of his own musical ability through Keller, but he also grows to understand himself and Keller enough to write the novel. He also has a loving relationship with his sweetheart, Rosie.

== Themes ==
Maestro has an ongoing theme of contrasts, including the differences between Paul's mother and father; Vienna and Darwin; high culture vs. low culture; and the contrast of Paul as an adolescent and Paul as an adult.

The maestro, Eduard Keller, lost his family during The Holocaust, despite performing private concerts for Adolf Hitler in the belief that he would spare Keller's Jewish family. For Keller, the grand piano is his sanctity and security, helping him deal with the horrors of the world "safe beneath that grand piano", and likewise offering him a way of deconstructing life. As Paul matures, Keller's phrasings, which seemed absurd in adolescence, ossify into a "musical bible whose texts I knew by heart"..

Maestro has themes of adolescence and growing up. Paul is educated about life through music and Keller's experiences in Vienna and understanding of human nature. The book tracks Paul as he develops into a responsible, mature man from an obnoxious, egotistical teenager.

== Recognition and awards ==
The book was shortlisted for the 1990 Miles Franklin Award. It has been translated into German,

It was chosen for the inaugural Australian "One Book—One Town" project in 2002.

In 2003, it appeared as 22nd on the Australian Society of Authors' list of the top 40 Australian books ever published.

== Adaptations ==
On 27 February 2009 the State Theatre Company of South Australia presented the premiere of a stage adaptation prepared by Goldsworthy's daughter Anna at Her Majesty's Theatre, Adelaide.
