= John H. Squires =

American football coach

Biographical details
- Born: January 19, 1882; Morven, North Carolina, U.S.
- Died: March 15, 1934 (aged 52); Florida, U.S.

Coaching career (HC unless noted)
- 1909: New Mexico A&M

Head coaching record
- Overall: 1–3–1

John Houston Squires (January 19, 1882 – March 15, 1934) was an American college football coach, agriculturist, chemical engineer, and financier. He served as the head football coach at New Mexico College of Agriculture and Mechanic Arts—now known as New Mexico State University—for one season, in 1909, compiling a record of 1–3–1.

Squires was born on January 19, 1882, in Morven, North Carolina, and moved with his mother to Lenoir, North Carolina in 1894. He attended North Carolina College of Agriculture and Mechanic Arts—now known as North Carolina State University—and earned a bachelor's degree and a master's degree from Virginia Agricultural and Mechanical College and Polytechnic Institute—now known as Virginia Tech. He then received a PhD from Cornell University.

In 1909, Squires was appointed the head of the department of agriculture at New Mexico A&M. He taught there for two years before going to work for DuPont. After World War I, he was a researcher for American Cyanamid and later worked for General Motors. Squires was instrumental in forming the Union National Bank of Lenoir. He served as the bank's vice president from its opening in 1931 until 1933.

Squires died on March 15, 1934, in an automobile accident, in Florida.

== Head coaching record ==
Year	Team	Overall	Conference	Standing	Bowl/playoffs
New Mexico A&M Aggies (Independent) (1909)
1909	New Mexico A&M	1–3–1			
New Mexico A&M:		1–3–1			
Total:		1–3–1			
