= When the Rain Stops Falling =

2008 play by Andrew Bovell

- Written by: Andrew Bovell
- Characters: Gabriel York, Gabriel Law, Gabrielle York, Henry Law, Andrew Price, Elizabeth Law, Joe Ryan
- Genre: Drama
- Setting: Alice Springs, Australia; London, England

Premiere
- Date: February 2008
- Place: Scott Theatre, Adelaide

When the Rain Stops Falling is a play about family, secret legacies, betrayal and forgiveness seen across four generations and spanning two continents. The drama had its world premiere as part of the 2008 Adelaide Festival of Arts.

It was written by renowned Australian playwright and screenwriter, Andrew Bovell.

== Synopsis ==
The play opens to the sound of falling rain in the desert region of Alice Springs, Australia in 2039.

Itinerant, eccentric wanderer, Gabriel York, is waiting for a visit from his adult English son, Andrew, after years of estrangement. Gabriel is keen to make a good impression. With an empty wallet, empty fridge and flooding barring the roads, Gabriel has no idea what to serve his son or where to find food. Suddenly a fish falls from the sky, landing at his feet.

The action then shifts to the past, to a modest flat in London in 1959.

The relationship between married couple Henry and Elizabeth Law (Gabriel York's grandparents) begins to suffer soon after their son (Gabriel Law) is born. In the same flat in 1988, Gabriel Law's relationship is strained due to his mother Elizabeth's refusal to shed light on his father's mysterious disappearance when he was only seven.

Keen to retrace his father's footsteps and piece together his family's past, Gabriel Law journeys to Australia where he meets a vulnerable young roadhouse waitress, Gabrielle York. Gabrielle is troubled by her own tragic past, having lost both her parents in the aftermath of her brother's disappearance. The pair discover the truth about their family histories.

== Setting ==
The play takes place in various timeframes between 1959 and 2039, in rural Alice Springs and Coorong, Australia and London, England. The 2039 scenes feel faintly apocalyptic. Much of the action is staged around a dining room table, where family members almost "catch glimpses of one another across time". Famous Australian landmark, Uluru can be seen as a surreal backdrop in several scenes.

== Characters ==
The full list of characters is:

- Gabriel York
- Gabriel Law
- Gabrielle York (younger and older versions)
- Henry Law
- Andrew Price
- Elizabeth Law (younger and older versions)
- Joe Ryan

The original cast of the 2008 and 2009 production consisted of Paul Blackwell, Michaela Cantwell, Carmel Johnson, Kris McQuade, Yalin Ozucelik, Anna Lise Phillips, Neil Pigot and musician and composer Quentin Grant, who was a collaborator in the creative process and performed the piano music live.

== Structure ==
The two hour full-length play is performed without an intermission. Its non-linear structure is unfolded in 22 scenes. The drama features several monologues.

A critic from Time Magazine described the play as featuring "the most complicated time-shifting dramatic structure I've seen in years" due to the deliberately disorienting shifts in timeframe and characters from different periods often overlapping on stage.

As the drama progresses, the connections between the interweaving stories and the characters become clear.

Repetition and idioms, passed down throughout the generations, are devices used throughout the play.

Described as a "poetic pretzel of a play", the drama has drawn comparisons to another structurally complex piece, Wajdi Mouawad's Incendies (also known as Scorched in English translation).

== Themes ==
When the Rain Stops Falling explores themes relating to self-identity, abandonment, forgiveness and love and how inherited legacies shape our future in seen and unseen ways.

The themes are referenced in Gabriel York's opening monologue as he nervously awaits his son:

"I know what he wants. He wants what all young men want from their fathers. He wants to know who he is. Where he comes from. Where he belongs. And for the life of me I don't know what to tell him."

According to Time Magazine journalist Richard Zoglin, the time shifts throughout the play serve as metaphors for the "impossibility of escaping the past, for the way we are all shaped by what came before — and are living in the shadow of what comes next." The drama poses the question of whether we have the capacity to correct the damage of the past in the present. For all its bleakness, there are surprising moments of humor. The play ends on a note of optimism and hope.

Climate change and how it has reshaped the world is a major theme, with the textured soundscape and lighting design conveying both an ominous atmosphere and an unceasing tropical rainstorm in Alice Springs in 2039.

In an interview, the playwright Andrew Bovell said the play depicted "the relationship between a family saga and the Anthropocene."

"We inherit what is unresolved from the past, and if we do not resolve it ourselves, we pass it on to our descendants. Are we prepared to pass on the damage from the past to our children?"

An Australian ABC Radio review referred to the play as a universal quest for answers, tackling the scope of global issues about whether the environment will survive humankind to more personal questions about "how we can survive our own family histories and traumas".

== Premiere and production history ==
The play was commissioned and originally produced by Brink Productions in Adelaide, South Australia, developed in collaboration with contemporary artist and designer, Hossein Valamanesh.

When Rain the Stops Falling was first performed at the Scott Theatre, University of Adelaide, on 28 February 2008. Directed by Chris Drummond, the production was co-presented by Brink Productions, the 2008 Adelaide Festival of Arts and the State Theatre Company of South Australia.

Australian productions have also taken place in Brisbane, Alice Springs, Cairns, Sydney and Perth.

The play premiered in Europe at the Almeida Theatre, London, on 15 May 2009. This production was directed by Michael Attenborough and designed by Miriam Buether.

In the United States, the play premiered at the Lincoln Center Theater, New York in March 2010 and was directed by David Cromer.

In New Zealand, the Silo Theatre-produced drama premiered at the Herald Theatre, Auckland, in June 2010.

The Canadian premiere was presented at the Shaw Festival in Niagara-on-the-Lake, Canada. The show was directed by renowned Canadian director Peter Hinton-Davis to critical acclaim.

The play’s development was supported by the Australia Council's New Australian Stories Initiative, Arts South Australia's Major Commissions, the Pratt Foundation and Brink Production’s Principal Benefactor Maureen Ritchie.

== Critical reception ==
The Australian newspaper described it as "a spell binding saga" while the Sydney Morning Herald stated it was a "theatre of rare intimacy and resonance."

The Daily Telegraph commented that it was "Visually arresting, cleverly written and populated with interesting, gritty characters…a truly great addition to modern Australian theatre..."

Time Magazine described it as "the best play of 2010".

In contrast, the New York Times commented the "elaborate structure" made it "hard to fully immerse yourself in the destinies of the people onstage".

Meanwhile, a Variety Magazine reviewer noted that the play "is likely to be a divisive work" due to its confusing narrative elements but acclaimed its "suspenseful and peculiar language, which is earthy and naturalistic but also intensely lyrical".

== Awards ==
The play has won a number of awards including:

- AWGIE Stage Award (2009)
- Sydney Theatre Awards - Best new Australian work (2009)
- Green Room Award - Best Production and Best New Writing for the Australian Stage (2009)
- Louis Esson Prize for Drama (2008)
- Queensland Premier's Literary Award - Best Drama (2008).

The production at the Lincoln Center Theater, New York, in 2010 won in five categories at the Lucille Lortel Awards, including Outstanding Director, Outstanding Featured Actress, Outstanding Scenic Design, Outstanding Lighting Design and Outstanding Sound Design.

The production at the Greenhouse Theater Center, Chicago won four awards at the 2013 Non-Equity Jeff Awards for Best Production, Best Director, Best Actress in a Supporting Role and Artistic Specialization.

== Publication ==
The script was first published by Currency Press, Australia in 2009.
