= Sam P. McBirney =

American football coach and banker

Biographical details
- Born: August 8, 1877; Chetopa, Kansas, U.S.
- Died: January 20, 1936 (aged 58); Tulsa, Oklahoma, U.S.

Coaching career (HC unless noted)
- 1908: Kendall
- 1909: New Mexico
- 1910: Kendall
- ?–1913: Tulsa HS (OK)
- 1914–1916: Kendall

Head coaching record
- Overall: 30–8–2 (college)

Accomplishments and honors

Championships
- 1 OIC (1916)

Sam Pendleton McBirney (August 8, 1877 – January 20, 1936) was an American football coach and banker. He was the head football coach for the Tulsa Golden Hurricane football team in 1908 and from 1914 to 1916. His undefeated 1916 team outscored opponents 566 to 40 to become the highest scoring college football team during the 1916 college football season. He has been called "one of the fathers of football in Oklahoma." McBirney was also a founder and vice president of Tulsa's Bank of Commerce from 1904 until his death in 1936.

== Early years ==
McBirney was born in Chetopa, Kansas, in 1877. He was the fourth child of Reverend Hugh McBirney and Susan Mark McBirney, who immigrated from County Tipperary, Ireland in approximately 1875. Rev. McBirney served for 30 years at a Methodist Episcopal Church in southern Kansas.

== Baseball and football player ==
McBirney was an athlete who won a wide reputation as a baseball player. After playing for baseball teams in Columbus and Coffeyville in southeastern Kansas, McBirney moved to Tulsa, Oklahoma in 1897 as the head of an independent baseball team. McBirney's older brother, James H. McBirney (1870–1944), also played as a pitcher for the Tulsa baseball team. One author has written that the McBirney brothers were brought to Tulsa as "ringers" for the city's baseball team.

While living in Tulsa, McBirney was also introduced to American football. McBirney played on a local football team that was described by an Oklahoma newspaper as "a rough-and-ready semi-pro team that met anybody, anywhere."

== Banking career ==
In the late 1890s, the McBirney brothers began working as bookkeepers for the Tulsa Banking Company. In 1904, after the Tulsa Banking Company was reorganized with majority control by individuals from outside Tulsa, Sam and James McBirney, along with two other investors, formed the Bank of Commerce (later known as the National Bank of Commerce) in Tulsa. McBirney served as a cashier and later as vice president of the bank. His older brother served as the president of the bank. The bank grew into the largest bank in Tulsa, and according to the Tulsa Historical Society, "became a cornerstone in the future growth of Tulsa."

== Football coach ==
=== 1908 season ===
In 1907, Henry Kendall College (which later became the University of Tulsa) relocated from Muskogee, Oklahoma, to Tulsa. In 1908, McBirney volunteered to take time away from his duties at the bank to coach the school's football team. McBirney's 1908 football team played no intercollegiate games and played four of its five games against local high schools and the fifth game against the Outrigger Canoe Club from Hawaii. Though outscoring opponents 80 to 43, the 1908 team won 2 games and lost 3.

=== University of New Mexico ===
McBirney was hired as the head football coach at the University of New Mexico in September 1909. After six weeks in Albuquerque, McBirnie returned to Tulsa. Hamilton H. Conwell and Hugh J. Collins assuming the coaching responsibilities for the final game of the season against New Mexico A&M.

=== 1910 season ===
In 1910, he returned to Kendall and coached the team to a 2–1–1 record.

=== Tulsa High School ===
After the 1908 season, McBirney returned to his work at the bank. He developed a love of football and began coaching the Tulsa High School football team. His 1913 Tulsa High School team completed an undefeated season, won a mythical Oklahoma state championship, and defeated Henry Kendall College 27 to 6.

=== 1914 and 1915 seasons ===
In 1914, local businessmen urged McBirney to take over as the football coach at Kendall College. At the time, the college had an enrollment of approximately 100 students and had played only one intercollegiate football game between 1900 and 1912 (the bulk of its games were played against high school teams).

McBirney agreed to take over as Kendall's football coach, and over the next three years, he built the Kendall football team into one of the best teams in the country. In 1914, the first season of true intercollegiate football at Tulsa, McBirney scheduled games against the state's top schools, including Oklahoma and Oklahoma A&M. The 1914 team finished with a record of 6–2, outscored opponents 261 to 48, and played respectably against both Oklahoma State (a 13–6 loss) and Oklahoma (a 26–7 loss).

In 1915, McBirney's football team improved to 6–1–1, played Oklahoma State to a scoreless tie, and lost a close game to Oklahoma by a score of 14–13. In its six victories, the 1915 team outscored opponents 244–19, including one-sided victories over Eastern Oklahoma State College (62–0), Northeastern State (55–0) and Southwestern Oklahoma State (45–7). McBirney's daughter, Mary McBirney, later recalled her father's devotion to coaching football: "We were always going to football games, sitting in the cold. We always had to sit on the top row so he could see all of the plays."

=== 1916 season ===
In 1916, Kendall College's enrollment increased to 400 students, and McBirney petitioned the school to hire a full-time physical education teacher and assistant football coach. McBirney recommended that the school hire Arkansas City, Kansas high school coach Francis Schmidt, who was later inducted into the College Football Hall of Fame.

With McBirney as head coach and Schmidt as his assistant coach, the 1916 Tulsa team compiled an undefeated 10–0 record and outscored opponents 566 to 40 to become the highest scoring college football team during the 1916 college football season. Kendall's 1916 games included high-scoring wins against Missouri-Rolla (117–0), St. Gregory (82–0), Ozarks (81–0), and Haskell Institute (46–0). The 1916 team featured John Young, who had played for McBirney at Tulsa High School and who had been recruited by Fielding H. Yost to play for the University of Michigan, and Ivan Grove, who had played for Schmidt at Arkansas City High School and became the top scoring player in college football in 1916 with 196 points.

The 1916 team gained renown for its short passing offense and for the deceptive and unique play calling of McBirney and Schmidt. In one game, Ivan Grove completed 12 consecutive passes on a single scoring drive. In another game, the team successfully executed a play the called the "tower play." Ivan Grove threw a pass to Vergil Jones as he sat on the shoulders of Puny Blevins. The play resulted in a touchdown and was declared illegal the following year. Schmidt's biographer, Brett Perkins, has suggested that the short-passing game developed by McBirney and Schmidt in 1916 was later absorbed and perfected at TCU by Dutch Meyer and Sammy Baugh.

In the lowest scoring game of the 1916 season, Kendall College defeated the Oklahoma Sooners by a score of 16 to 0 at the Sooners' home field in Norman, Oklahoma. The victory at Norman broke an 18-game winning streak for Oklahoma, and was the first time that the Sooners were beaten in football by another school from Oklahoma. In the three games preceding the 1916 Oklahoma-Kendall game, Oklahoma had outscored its opponents 27–0, 107–0, and 140–0. The 1916 victory over the undefeated Sooners put Tulsa football on the map.

Historian and Tulsa journalist Jenk Jones recalled, "In 1916, there was a lot of agitation here to declare Tulsa the Champion of Mid America."

After the 1916 season, McBirney retired as Kendall's football coach to devote his full-time to the bank. McBirney had hand-picked Francis Schmidt as his successor, but Schmidt enlisted in the U.S. Army after the United States entered World War I in April 1917. After two years of military service, Schmidt led the team to back-to-back undefeated seasons in 1919 and 1920 before moving on to a successful coaching career with Arkansas, TCU, and Ohio State.

=== Inspirational director for Oklahoma Sooners ===
Although McBirney retired from coaching, he later assisted the Oklahoma Sooners' head football coach Bennie Owen as an "inspirational" director before key games.

== Developer of early Tulsa skyscrapers ==
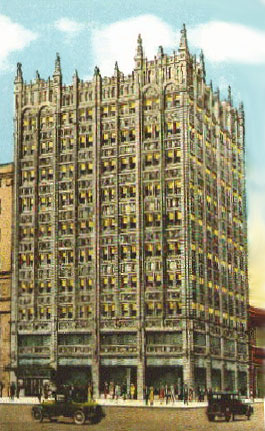
How the McBirney Building should look with all of its terra cotta details intact. This building is now known as the Holarud Building.

The success of the National Bank of Commerce allowed the McBirney brothers to form the McBirney Investment Company, with James as the president and Sam as the treasurer. The McBirney Investment Company built two of Tulsa's early skyscrapers. In 1923, they built a seven-story building originally known as the Bank of Commerce building, at 10 East Third Street. In 1928, they built the McBirney Building, a 10-story office building located at the southwest corner of Main and Third Streets in Tulsa.

== Aunt Chick ==
McBirney's wife, Nettie McBirney, gained national fame as a syndicated newspaper columnist beginning in 1935. Her column, written under the pseudonym Aunt Chick, taught readers about cooking. When McBirney found out that his wife had decided to write a newspaper column, he reportedly said, "That crazy woman will start a run on the bank if people think she has to work!"

McBirney married Nettie in 1913. The couple had four children: Susan Bush, Williams, Samuel, and Mary Megan Bryan.

== Death ==
After a long illness, McBirney died at his home in Tulsa in January 1936 at age 58. At the time of his death, the Associated Press called him "one of the fathers of football in Oklahoma."

== Head coaching record ==
=== College ===
Year	Team	Overall	Conference	Standing	Bowl/playoffs
Kendall Orange and Black (Independent) (1908)
1908	Kendall	2–3			
University of New Mexico (Independent) (1909)
1909	University of New Mexico	4–2			
University of New Mexico:		4–2			
Kendall Orange and Black (Independent) (1908)
1908	Kendall	2–1–1			
Kendall Orange and Black (Oklahoma Intercollegiate Conference) (1914–1916)
1914	Kendall	6–2	3–2	3rd	
1915	Kendall	6–1–1	4–1–1	2nd	
1916	Kendall	10–0	4–0	1st	
Kendall:		26–6–2	11–3–1		
Total:		30–8–2			
National championship Conference title Conference division title or championship game berth

== See also ==
- List of college football head coaches with non-consecutive tenure
