= Colin Spencer =

English writer and artist (1933–2023)

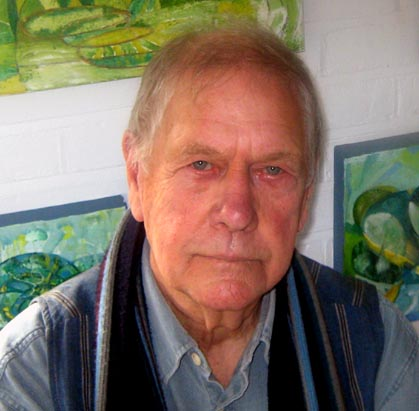
- Born: 17 July 1933; Thornton Heath, London, England
- Died: 6 July 2023 (aged 89)
- Occupation: Writer

Colin Spencer (17 July 1933 – 6 July 2023) was an English writer and artist who produced a prolific body of work in a wide variety of media after his first published short stories and drawings appeared in The London Magazine and Encounter when he was 22. His work included novels, short stories, non-fiction (including histories of food and of homosexuality), vegetarian cookery books, stage and television plays, paintings and drawings, book and magazine illustrations. He wrote and presented a television documentary on vandalism, appeared in numerous radio and television programmes and lectured on food history, literature and social issues. For fourteen years he wrote a regular food column for The Guardian.

== Early and personal life ==
Colin Spencer was born on 17 July 1933 in Thornton Heath, London, and was largely brought up in the south of England. From an early age he knew that he wanted to paint and write. He attended Brighton Grammar School and went on to study at Brighton Art College, but later came to feel himself to be wholly self-educated. His colourful family provided his youthful imagination with rich material for his later novels, as did his passionate emotional involvements with both men and women.

Spencer spent his period of National Service as a pacifist in the Royal Army Medical Corps until 1952. He subsequently lived in London, Vienna, Athens and on the Greek island of Lesbos. His first novel was published when he was 28. His portrait of E.M. Forster was painted when he was 29. He married twice and had three grandsons and a great-granddaughter.

Spencer never stopped painting and writing, and lived in East Sussex where he wrote the second volume of his autobiography, staring with delight at the Seven Sisters, gardening, and producing the paintings he felt he had striven to create throughout his life described in The Financial Times How to Spend It magazine as "muscular, powerfully envisaged oils", the work of "a remarkable Indian summer".

The first volume of his 3-part autobiography, Quartet Books had been published in April 2013. Backing into Light: My Father's Son tells the story of the first 3 decades of his life through his wartime boyhood dominated by his raucous, womanizing and irrepressible father, to his first successes in the 50s and 60s as an artist, novelist and playwright. They were years that saw affairs with both women and men, a stormy marriage, the birth of a son, and a traumatic divorce. The book has been described as “full of clear-eyed observation and thoughtful reflection, as well as comic incident … unflinchingly honest and exuberantly entertaining,” while The Spectator finds it “a remarkable autobiography which subverts everything you thought you knew about love and life.”

Spencer authored several vegetarian cookbooks and a history of vegetarianism but was not a vegetarian in his personal life.

== Fiction ==
From 1955 Spencer had nine novels as well as numerous short stories published both in the UK and abroad. His work can be divided into the 4 semi-autobiographical works of the Generation sequence; the two satirical black comedies Poppy, Mandragora and the New Sex, and How the Greeks Kidnapped Mrs Nixon (republished in paperback under the title Cock-Up); the sexual realist drama Panic, a compassionate examination of the mentality of a child murderer; the experimental Asylum, merging the myths of Oedipus and the Old Testament Fall of Man into a narrative written in a style akin to poetic prose; and his first novel, set mostly in Vienna, An Absurd Affair, which he later felt could be sensibly ignored.

That first novel was followed in 1963 by Anarchists in Love the first book of his four-volume novel sequence GENERATION which the author described as the main core of his work, and “fictionalised autobiography.” Further volumes in the series The Tyranny of Love, Lovers in War and The Victims of Love appeared in 1967, 1969 and 1978. With a Dickensian breadth of characters and social settings, the four volumes follow the saga of the Simpson family from the end of World War I through to the 1960s age of sexual and social experimentation. It focuses in particular on the tortuous search for self-realisation and love by Sundy and Matthew, the two artistically gifted children of the raucously womanising Eddy. The sequence was described by Sir Huw Wheldon as a "work of serious purpose; affecting, hilarious and grave. It is a tapestry of unforgettable characters in all their seaminess and sadness, their idealism and desires."

== Theatre ==
Seven of Colin Spencer's plays have been performed since the first production in December 1966 at the Hampstead Theatre Club of The Ballad of The False Barman. It was directed by Robin Phillips and featured Caroline Blakiston, Penelope Keith and Michael Pennington. The play is a musical fantasy set in a beach bar run by a bald-headed lesbian "barman" and peopled by whores of various sexes and their clientele, including a transvestite thieving vicar.

His next play to be performed, Spitting Image, also first appeared at Hampstead in October 1968 before moving to The Duke of York's in the West End. The production was directed by James Roose-Evans and starred Derek Fowlds, Frank Middlemass and Lally Bowers. Further productions followed in 1969 off Broadway in New York, in Arnhem, The Netherlands, in Vienna and in Australia. The play concerns a homosexual couple who discover that they are expecting a baby, and society's reaction to this unconventional conception. John Russell Taylor in his book, The Second Wave: British Drama of the Sixties, remarks “for all the play’s cheery light fantastic [it] contains altogether more truth than is quite comfortable." The play was revived in a performance at the Hampstead Theatre in 2009 as part of the celebrations of the theatre’s 50th anniversary.

Three comedies: The Trial of St George, a satire on British justice when dealing with sexuality, inspired by the Oz Trial; Why Mrs Neustadter Always Loses, a wry monologue by an American divorcee exiled on a Greek island; and Keep It in the Family, a satire concerning a happy incestuous family (which Colin Spencer also directed) appeared between 1972 and 1978 at the Soho Poly. Interest in his work abroad led to performances of his play The Sphinx Mother, a modern Oedipus, at the Salzburg Festival in 1972, and Lilith, a comedy of surrealist images, at the Schauspielhaus, Vienna in 1979.

== Non-fiction ==
Colin Spencer's first published non-fiction book (written with Chris Barlas), which appeared in 1984, was a treatise on farting, Reports from Behind, illustrated by Spencer cartoons. His moving account of his affair with the Australian theatre director, John Tasker, Which of Us Two?, was first published by Viking in 1990, and then in a paperback edition by Penguin in 1991. The Faber Book of Food, an anthology, collected and written with Claire Clifton, was published by Faber & Faber in 1994. His interest in sexuality and social attitudes towards it led to the publication of Homosexuality – a History in 1995, and The Gay Kama Sutra in the following year.

His scholarly interest in food culture and history led to the publication of The Heretic's Feast – a History of Vegetarianism in 1993 (also published in the US in 1995, and winning a special mention in the Premio Langhe Ceretto prize of Italy), the award-winning British Food – an Extraordinary Thousand Years of History in 2002, and his recently published book From Microliths to Microwaves – The Evolution of British Agriculture, Food and Cooking, an account of the long history of farming, food and cookery in Britain and how our national cuisine was forged.

== Cookery books ==
From early on Colin Spencer's creative instincts were applied to food and cookery, and in 1978 his book Gourmet Cooking for Vegetarians was published. That was followed through the 80s and 90s by a series of other cookery books, totalling 18 in all.

For fourteen years he wrote a regular food column for the Guardian. His column was particularly concerned with exploring current issues and anxieties about food production and manufacture. In 2001 he was described by Germaine Greer as 'the greatest living food writer'.

Spencer received many awards for his food writing, including the Guild of Food Writers Michael Smith Award, the André Simon Memorial Fund Special Award, the Gourmand World Cookbook Award for the Best Culinary History Book in the World, and the Glenfiddich Cookery Writer of the Year Award.

== Visual arts ==
During his twenties numerous of Colin Spencer's drawings were published in The London Magazine, The Transatlantic Review and Encounter. A series of drawings of writers of our time was published in The Times Literary Supplement in 1959. Those he portrayed included John Betjeman, E.M. Forster, C.P.Snow and his wife Pamela Hansford Johnson, Graham Greene, Alan Ross, Iris Murdoch, Angus Wilson, Evelyn Waugh, John Lehmann, Stevie Smith, V.S.Naipaul, and John Osborne, among others. An oil portrait of E.M. Forster hung for many years in his rooms at King's College Cambridge. On his death Forster left it to Benjamin Britten and Peter Pears and it is now in the Britten-Pears Library in Aldeburgh.

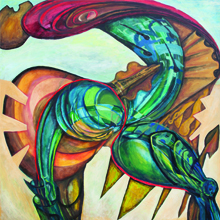
Colin Spencer painting: Travelling Player 2011

Colin Spencer had huge fun working alongside Katharine Whitehorn to illustrate her column in the national Sunday newspaper, The Observer, with satirical drawings delineating the public's interpretation of fashion trends. He was commissioned by the Royal Opera House to draw their idiosyncratic opera audience for their members' Magazine. He has completed oil portraits for a wide range of private customers and collectors, including Carl Winter, Director of the Fitzwilliam Museum, Cambridge; Lady Rawlinson; Diana Hopkinson; Michael Davidson; and Canon Frederic Hood of Pusey House, Oxford. His work resides in a wide range of private collections amongst those of Melvyn Bragg, Germaine Greer, Derek Grainger, Bob Swash, Diana Athill, Prue Leith and the late Mary Renault and Sir Huw Wheldon.

His subsequent artistic work ranged from landscape drawings of Winchelsea Beach and Rye countryside to oil portraits of the poet Harry Fainlight and has lately been exhibited in London, Rye and Brighton. A recent series of paintings entitled The Downs reflected the sensuous forms of the landscape of the South Downs where he lived. He was latterly intensely involved in creating paintings which he described as "images of the unknown, paths through conflict, compounds of sex and spirit, mysterious reflections, hints and fading memories which unsettle the darkness." The themes of his recent paintings are: War, Music, and Sex, the interior life of flowers, the sea bed and how do hills form roots.

== Other activities ==
Spencer was Co-Chairman (1982), Chairman (1988–90) and Vice-President (1990–99) of The Writers Guild of Great Britain and President of the Guild of Food Writers (1994–99). He continued as a judge for the J R Ackerley Prize for Autobiography.

== Death ==
Colin Spencer died on 6 July 2023, eleven days shy of his 90th birthday.

== Works ==
=== Fiction ===
- An Absurd Affair, 1961, Longmans Green. 1970, Panther Books, (paperback), ISBN 0-586-01817-4, ISBN 978-0-586-01817-0.
- Poppy, Mandragora and the New Sex, 1966, Anthony Blond. 1967, Panther Books, (paperback), ISBN 0-586-02233-3, ISBN 978-0-586-02233-7.
- Asylum, 1966, Anthony Blond. 1970, Panther Books, (paperback), ISBN 0-586-03294-0.
- Panic, 1971, Martin Secker & Warburg, ISBN 0-436-48020-4; ISBN 978-0-436-48020-1. 1973, Panther Books (paperback), ISBN 0-586-03766-7, ISBN 978-0-586-03766-9.
- How The Greeks Kidnapped Mrs Nixon, 1974, Quartet Books, ISBN 0-7043-2060-6, ISBN 978-0-7043-2060-4. 1977, republished as Cock-up, Quartet Books, (paperback), ISBN 978-0-7043-1311-8. 1977.

==== Novel sequence Generation ====
- Anarchists in Love, 1963, Eyre & Spottiswood (with jacket designed by author). 1970, Panther Books, (paperback), ISBN 0-586-02329-1.
- The Tyranny of Love, 1967, Anthony Blond, ISBN 0-218-51501-4 ISBN 978-0218515015. 1970, Panther Books (paperback), ISBN 0-586-02561-8, ISBN 978-0-586-02561-1.
- Lovers in War, 1969, Anthony Blond, ISBN 0-218-51276-7, ISBN 978-0-218-51276-2. 1970, Panther Books, ISBN 0-586-03293-2, ISBN 978-0-586-03293-0.
- The Victims of Love, 1978, Quartet Books, ISBN 0-7043-2155-6, ISBN 978-0-7043-2155-7. 1980, Quartet Books (paperback), ISBN 0-7043-3332-5, ISBN 978-0-7043-3332-1.

==== Uncollected short stories ====
- Nightworkers, in London Magazine, vol. 2, no. 12, 1955.
- An Alien World, in London Magazine, vol. 3, no. 6, 1956.
- Nymph and Shepherd, in London Magazine, vol. 6, no. 8, 1959.
- It's Anemones for Mabel, in Transatlantic Review (London), Spring 1963.
- The Room, in Transatlantic Review (London), Summer 1966.
- Carpaccio's Dream, in Harpers and Queen (London), Dec 1985.

=== Plays produced ===
- The Ballad of the False Barman, Dec 1966: Hampstead Theatre Club. Sept 1972: Palace Theatre, Watford.
- Spitting Image, Sept 1968: Hampstead Theatre Club. Oct 1968: Duke of York's, London. March 1969: Theatre de Lys, New York. Sept 1969: Schauspielhaus Wuppertal, Germany. Nov 1969: Arnhem, The Netherlands. 1970: Vienna. 1971: Australia. Published in Plays and Players, September 1968.
- The Sphinx Mother, Aug 1972: Salzburg Festival.
- The Trial of St George, March 1972: Soho Poly, London. 1972: Thalia Theater, Hamburg. 1972: Der Kammerspielen, Wuppertal.
- Why Mrs Neustadter Always Loses, Nov 1972: Soho Poly, London.
- Keep It in the Family (written and directed by Colin Spencer), 1978: Soho Poly, London.
- Lilith, Feb 1979: Schauspielhaus, Vienna.
- A Woman Alone, Feb 1983, performed reading by the RSC at the Pit, Barbican, London

=== Non-fiction ===
- Reports From Behind (with Chris Barlas), 1984, Enigma Books (with 27 illustrations by Colin Spencer), ISBN 978-0727820389.
- Which of Us Two? The Story of a Love Affair, 1990, Viking, ISBN 978-0-670-83076-3.
- The Faber Book of Food, an Anthology (with Claire Clifton), 1994, Faber and Faber ISBN 978-0-571-16467-7.
- The Heretic's Feast – a History of Vegetarianism, 1993, Fourth Estate, ISBN 978-1-85702-078-6.
- Homosexuality – a History, 1995, Fourth Estate, ISBN 978-1-85702-143-1.
- The Gay Kama Sutra, 1996, B.T. Batsford, ISBN 9780713481099. 1996, Harmony Books, (1st US edition).
- British Food – An Extraordinary Thousand Years of History, 2002, Grub Street, (illustrated edition), ISBN 978-1-904010-16-6.
- From Microliths to Microwaves, The Evolution of British Agriculture, Food and Cooking, May 2011, Grub Street, ISBN 978-1-908117-00-7.
- Backing into Light, My Father's Son, April 2013, Quartet, ISBN 9780704372962

=== Television ===
- Vandal Rule OK?, 1977, Documentary on vandalism written, narrated and presented by Colin Spencer.
- Flossie, 1974, TV play.

=== Cookery books ===
- Gourmet Cooking For Vegetarians, 1978, Andre Deutsch, ISBN 0-233-96961-6.
- Good And Healthy, 1983, Robson Books, ISBN 978-0-86051-222-6.
- Colin Spencer's Vegetarian Wholefood Cookbook, 1985, Panther Books, 1985, Panther/Granada, (paperback), ISBN 978-0-586-06316-3.
- Cordon Vert, 52 Vegetarian Gourmet Dinner Party Menus, 1985, Thorsons, ISBN 0722508948/
- Mediterranean Vegetarian Cooking, 1986, Thorsons, ISBN 978-0-7225-0979-1.
- The Vegetarians' Healthy Diet Book (Positive Health Guide), (with T.A.B. Sanders), 1986, Taylor & Francis, ISBN 0-948269-05-7
- The New Vegetarian, 1986, Elm Tree Books, ISBN 9780241118948. 1988
- Colin Spencer's Fish Cookbook, 1986, Pan Books, (paperback) ISBN 0-330-29221-8.
- One-course Feasts, 1986, Conran Octopus (spiral comb-bound), ISBN 978-1-85029-071-1.
- Feast For Health, 1987, Dorling Kindersley, ISBN 978-0-86318-220-4.
- Al Fresco A Feast for Outdoor Entertaining, 1987, Thorsons, ISBN 9780722513378.
- The Romantic Vegetarian: Very Special Meals for That Very Special Occasion, Thorsons, Feb 1988, ISBN 978-0-7225-1327-9.
- Colin Spencer’s Summer Cooking, 1992, Thorsons, (paperback), ISBN 9780722526538.
- The Adventurous Vegetarian, 1989, Weidenfeld Nicolson Illustrated, ISBN 978-0-304-31808-7.
- Vegetable Pleasures, 1992, Fourth Estate, ISBN 978-1-85702-016-8.
- Colin Spencer's Vegetable Guide, 1995, Conran Octopus, ISBN 978-1-85029-645-4.
- Green Gastronomy, 1996, Bloomsbury, ISBN 0-7475-2298-7 ISBN 9780747522980.
- Mainly Vegetables, 1998, Tesco.
- The Vegetarian Kitchen, 1986, with Tom Sanders, Ph.D., The Body Press, HPBooks, Inc., Tucson, AZ; Martin Dunitz Limited, London; ISBN 0-89586-467-3.

== See also ==
- History of vegetarianism
