= Three Dog Night (novel) =

2003 novel by Peter Goldsworthy

- First edition
- Author: Peter Goldsworthy
- Language: English
- Genre: Novel
- Publisher: Viking Press, Australia
- Publication date: 2003
- Publication place: Australia
- Media type: Print (Paperback)
- Pages: 341 pp
- ISBN: 0-670-89398-6
- OCLC: 54104048
- Dewey Decimal: 823/.914 22
- LC Class: PR9619.3.G58 T49 2003
- Preceded by: Keep It Simple, Stupid
- Followed by: Everything I Knew: A Novel

Three Dog Night is a 2003 novel by Australian author Peter Goldsworthy.

== Dramatic adaptation ==
In 2008 Petra Kalive adapted this novel for the stage. Its first production was directed by Andrew Gray at Two Blue Cherries Theatre Company at fortyfivedownstairs in Melbourne from 14–25 May 2008. It then toured nationally.

== Awards ==
- FAW Christina Stead Award, 2003: winner
- Colin Roderick Award, 2003: shortlisted
- New South Wales Premier's Literary Awards, Christina Stead Prize for Fiction, 2004: shortlisted
- Miles Franklin Literary Award, 2004: shortlisted
- Queensland Premier's Literary Awards, Best Fiction Book, 2004: shortlisted
- The Courier-Mail Book of the Year Award, 2004: shortlisted
- International Dublin Literary Award, 2005: longlisted
