= Chris Drummond =

Australian theatre director

- Born: Kimba, South Australia
- Occupation: Theatre director
- Years active: 2001-present
- Notable work: When The Rain Stops Falling, The Flying Dutchman

Chris Drummond is an Australian theatre director. He was artistic director of Brink Productions (2004-2023). and Associate Director with the State Theatre Company of South Australia (2001-2004).

== Personal life ==
Drummond was born in Kimba, South Australia. He studied theatre under Frank Ford at the University of Adelaide graduating in 1992. He is married to arts administrator Susannah Sweeney. They have three children.

== Career ==
From 2001 to 2004, Drummond was Associate Director at the State Theatre Company of South Australia under the Artistic Directorship of Rosalba Clemente. Alongside productions of Art by Yasmina Reza, The Dying Gaul by Craig Lucas and The Merchant of Venice by William Shakespeare, Drummond developed new Australian plays for the State Theatre Company’s On-Site Theatre Laboratory, including Drowning My Ocean of You by Fiona Sprott. In 2004, Drummond directed Night Letters for the State Theatre Company and Playbox Theatre, which he co-adapted from the novel by Robert Dessaix, with writer Susan Rogers.

In 2004, Drummond was appointed inaugural Artistic Director of Brink Productions focusing the company’s work on the creation of original, often large-scale theatre. In 2008, Drummond directed the World Premiere production of When the Rain Stops Falling by Andrew Bovell, with stage designs by visual artist Hossein Valamanesh, for Brink Productions in co-production with the State Theatre Company as part of the Adelaide Festival. The highly acclaimed production went on to tour nationally, appearing in seasons with Sydney Theatre Company, Melbourne Theatre Company, Queensland Theatre, Canberra Theatre Centre and Araluen Arts Centre. In 2013, Drummond directed Thursday by Bryony Lavery for the 2013 Adelaide Festival, in a Brink co-production with English Touring Theatre. Thursday was also staged at the Canberra Theatre Centre as South Australia's 'gift' to the Canberra Centenary. In 2015, Drummond adapted and directed The Aspirations of Daise Morrow, drawn from the short story Down at the Dump by Patrick White. The production toured in 2018 to Galway International Arts Festival and the Edinburgh Fringe. Drummond directed Ancient Rain by Paul Kelly, Camille O'Sullivan and Feargal Murray in 2016, which was produced by Far & Away Productions in association with Brink, with seasons at the Dublin Theatre Festival, Arts Centre Melbourne, Merrigong Theatre, Dark Mofo, Queensland Performing Arts Centre and Adelaide Cabaret Festival. Drummond also directed Memorial, a theatricalisation of the poem by Alice Oswald, starring Helen Morse and featuring an original score by Jocelyn Pook with choreography by Yaron Lifschitz. The acclaimed production was presented at the 2018 Adelaide Festival, 2018 Brisbane Festival and the Barbican.

Drummond received a Best Director Nomination at the 2010 Helpmann Awards for his production of The Flying Dutchman for State Opera South Australia. Conducted by Nicholas Braithwaite, the production starred John Wegner, Margaret Medlyn, Stuart Skelton and Daniel Sumegi.
