= 1909 Arizona football team =

American college football season

1909 Arizona football
- Conference: Independent
- Record: 3–1
- Head coach: H. B. Galbraith (2nd season)
- Captain: Thomas Briggs Rice

1909 Western college football independents records
	Conf.			Overall
Team	W	L	T	W		L		T
St. Vincent's		–		6	–	0	–	0
Montana		–		6	–	0	–	1
Utah		–		4	–	1	–	0
Denver		–		7	–	2	–	0
Arizona		–		3	–	1	–	0
New Mexico		–		4	–	2	–	0
USC		–		3	–	1	–	2
Hawaii		–		2	–	2	–	0
Utah Agricultural		–		2	–	2	–	1
Wyoming		–		3	–	5	–	0
New Mexico A&M		–		1	–	3	–	1
Montana Agricultural		–		0	–	6	–	1

The 1909 Arizona football team was an American football team that represented the University of Arizona as an independent during the 1909 college football season. In its second and final season under head coach H. B. Galbraith, the team compiled a 3–1 record, shut out three of four opponents, and outscored all opponents by a total of 71 to 23. The team captain was Thomas Briggs Rice.

== Schedule ==
Date	Opponent	Site	Result	Attendance	Source
October 30	Fort Huachuca	Tucson, Arizona Territory	W 33–0		
November 6	vs. New Mexico A&M	Washington Park; El Paso, TX	W 6–0		
November 13	Prescott High School	Eastlake Park; Tucson, Arizona Territory	W 21–0		
November 25	New Mexico	Tucson, Arizona Territory (rivalry)	L 11–23	1,500	
