= Harry Goldsworthy (American football) =

American college football player and coach, state legislator, and farmer (1883–1970)

Biographical details
- Born: October 5, 1883; Rosalia, Washington, U.S.
- Died: March 5, 1970 (aged 86); Spokane, Washington, U.S.

Playing career

Football
- 1904–1907: Washington State

Coaching career (HC unless noted)

Football
- 1908: Davenport HS (WA)
- 1909: Cheyney Normal

Track and field
- 1908–1909: Davenport HS (WA)

Administrative career (AD unless noted)
- 1909: Cheyney Normal

Head coaching record
- Overall: 0–2 (college football)

Harry Edgar Goldsworthy (October 5, 1883 – March 5, 1970) was an American college football player and coach, state legislator, and farmer. He served as the head football coach at State Normal School at Cheney–now known as Eastern Washington University–for one season, in 1909, compiling a record of 0–2.

Goldsworthy was born on October 5, 1883, in Rosalia, Washington, to John Henry and Eliza (Booth) Goldsworthy. He played football at the State College of Washington—now known as Washington State University from 1904 to 1907, captaining the 1906 Washington State football team. In 1908, Goldsworthy coached football and track at Davenport High School in Davenport, Washington.

Goldsworthy served in the Washington House of Representatives from 1921 to 1931. He farmed in Rosalia and helped to organize the Northwest Grain Grower's Association. Goldsworthy died on March 5, 1970, at a hospital in Spokane, Washington. He was survived by two sons, Harry E. Goldsworthy and Robert F. Goldsworthy.

== Head coaching record ==
| Year | Team | Overall | Conference | Standing | Bowl/playoffs |
|---|---|---|---|---|---|
Cheyney Normal (Independent) (1909)
| 1909 | Cheyney Normal | 0–2 | | | |
| Cheyney Normal: | | 0–2 | | | |
| Total: | | 0–2 | | | |
