= James H. McBirney =

- Born: March 1, 1870; Cloghjordan, Ireland
- Died: June 8, 1944 (aged 74); Tulsa, Oklahoma
- Occupations: Banking, philanthropy
- Known for: Founded National Bank of Commerce in Tulsa, Oklahoma

James Hugh McBirney (March 1, 1870 – June 8, 1944) was an Ireland-born Oklahoma banker and bank organizer.

Born in County Tipperary, Ireland, McBirney emigrated to the United States with his family when he was about five years old. The family settled in southern Kansas, where his father, Hugh McBirney, served as a Methodist minister. James grew up in Kansas and moved to Oklahoma Territory in time to participate in an 1883 land run, but failed to win the plot of his choice. Armed with only a public school education, he entered the banking business. In 1897, he was offered a job in the newly organized Bank of Tulsa, rising to the position of Vice President. He organized his own Bank of Commerce in Tulsa in 1904, which he renamed in 1911 as the National Bank of Commerce.

== Early life ==
McBirney was born in Cloghjordan, County Tipperary, Ireland on March 1, 1870. He was the eldest son of the Reverend Hugh McBirney D.D., and Susan Mark McBirney. His father was a Methodist minister. Although Hugh and Susan had twelve children, James had only five siblings who survived childhood: Robert A., Anna, Sam P., Lea, and Caroline. The family moved to the United States and settled in southern Kansas when James was about five and a half years old and where he completed his education in public schools.

It appears that James' formal education consisted only of public school. His biography makes no mention of attending college. In 1883, he came to Oklahoma Territory to participate in the Cherokee Outlet Land Run. He claimed a tract of land in what would eventually become Enid, Oklahoma, but lost it when officials discovered that the tract had already been surveyed and reserved for public use. In 1895, James moved to the area of Indian Territory that would become Bartlesville, Oklahoma.

== Banking career ==
He was hired by the Bank of Columbus in Columbus, Kansas, first as a janitor in 1889, then was soon appointed bookkeeper. After working in Columbus for three years, he moved to the same position in the C. M. Condon and Company Bank (later named the Condon National Bank) in Coffeyville, Kansas, where he worked for two years. In 1897, he moved to Tulsa to work for the Tulsa Banking Company (TBC). (Note: Founded in 1895, TBC was the first bank established in Indian Territory (now eastern Oklahoma).) He became vice president of the TBC in 1904.

When controlling interest in TBC passed to a group of non-Tulsans, James decided that he would organize a bank that had local control. On February 4, 1904, James, his brother Sam P. McBirney, Lee Clinton and T. E. Smiley, organized the Bank of Commerce. In 1911, the business reorganized with a federal charter and was renamed National Bank of Commerce. (Note: The bank founded by McBirney should not be confused with today's National Bank of Commerce, Inc., which is headquartered in Altus, Oklahoma.)

His notability as a banker extended well beyond Tulsa. He was a member of the Executive Council of the American Bankers Association (ABA) for ten years, and served as chairman of the ABA Agriculture Committee for six years.

== Personal ==
James married Vera Clinton, the daughter of Charles and Louise (Atkins) Clinton on June 6, 1901. (Note: Vera Clinton was a sister of Dr. Fred S. Clinton, who wrote the biography of James H. McBirney that appeared in the Chronicles of Oklahoma.) The wedding ceremony was held at the Clinton family home in Red Fork, Creek Nation, Indian Territory. The groom's father officiated, with the assistance of Rev. C. W. Kerr, minister of the First Presbyterian Church in Tulsa. The McBirneys had four children, three of whom lived to adulthood: Dorothy Vera, Martha and J. D. The fourth, Simmons, died in 1936. The McBirneys first lived at 417 South Main Street, and later moved to 515 South Denver. In 1928, they moved into a much more spacious house at 1414 South Galveston. The last, often called the McBirney Mansion still stands and is listed on the National Register of Historic Places.

According to biographer, Dr. Fred Clinton, James was enthusiastic about sports, especially football, baseball, hunting, fishing and camping. One of the reasons he accepted a position at the Tulsa Banking Company is that he was promised an opportunity to play on the first Tulsa baseball team in 1897. James' younger brother, Sam, played on the same team.

== Religious affiliation ==
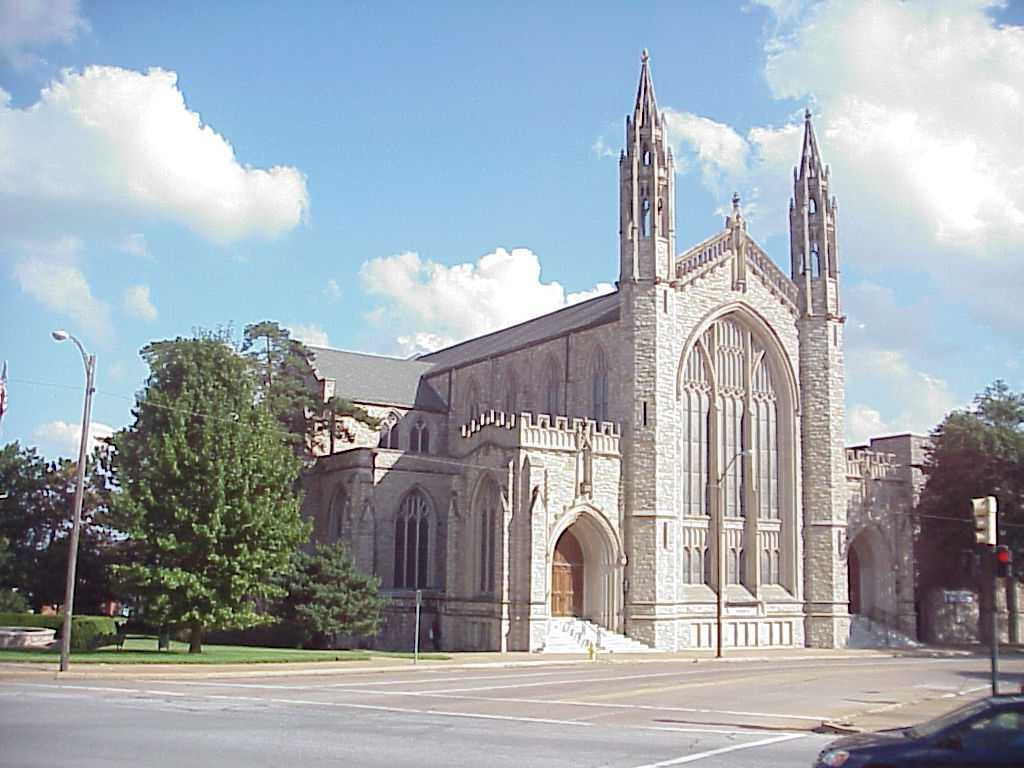
James H. McBirney was long associated with First Methodist Church in Tulsa.

James had joined the First Methodist Church in 1897, soon after he arrived in Tulsa. The church apparently was one of the major beneficiaries of his philanthropy. and he served as chairman of the Board of Trustees for more than 40 years. He is credited with spearheading the effort to build the Gothic structure on Boulder Avenue that is still very active. (Note: The church is now named First United Methodist Church of Tulsa.) A room adjoining the sanctuary is named McBirney Chapel, in honor of James' parents, brothers and sisters.

James McBirney died in Tulsa on June 8, 1944. His funeral was held at First Methodist Church (Tulsa) and he was buried in Rose Hill Cemetery.

== Other activities ==
James was an active member of the Masons, attaining the Knights Templar degree in the York rites and the 32nd degree in the Scottish rites. He also was a member of the Tulsa Club, the Tulsa Country Club, Chamber of Commerce, Mens Dinner Club and the Knife and Fork Club. He also devoted time and money to charitable organizations, especially the Red Cross and Community Chest.
