= 1909 Montana football team =

American college football season

1909 Montana football
- Conference: Independent
- Record: 6–0–1
- Head coach: Roy White (2nd season)
- Captain: Bishop
- Home stadium: Montana Field

1909 Western college football independents records
	Conf.			Overall
Team	W	L	T	W		L		T
St. Vincent's		–		6	–	0	–	0
Montana		–		6	–	0	–	1
Utah		–		4	–	1	–	0
Denver		–		7	–	2	–	0
Arizona		–		3	–	1	–	0
New Mexico		–		4	–	2	–	0
USC		–		3	–	1	–	2
Hawaii		–		2	–	2	–	0
Utah Agricultural		–		2	–	2	–	1
Wyoming		–		3	–	5	–	0
New Mexico A&M		–		1	–	3	–	1
Montana Agricultural		–		0	–	6	–	1

The 1909 Montana football team represented the University of Montana in the 1909 college football season. They were led by second-year head coach Roy White, and finished the season with a record of six wins, zero losses and one tie (6–0–1).

== Schedule ==
Date	Opponent	Site	Result	Source
September 25	Missoula High School	Missoula, MT	W 33–0	
October 1	Fort Shaw Indian School	Missoula, MT	W 52–0	
October 9	at Montana Mines	Butte, MT	T 0–0	
October 22	at Montana Agricultural	Bozeman, MT (rivalry)	W 3–0	
November 6	Fort Missoula	Missoula, MT	W 42–0	
November 12	Montana Mines	Missoula, MT	W 24–0	
November 25	Montana Agricultural	Montana Field; Missoula, MT	W 15–5	
