= John Tasker (theatre director) =

Australian theatre director (1933–1988)

- Born: 25 May 1933; Newcastle, New South Wales, Australia
- Died: 18 June 1988 (aged 55)
- Occupation: theatre director

John Howard Tasker (25 May 1933 – 18 June 1988) was an Australian theatre director.

== Biography ==
He was born in Newcastle, New South Wales and educated at Newcastle Boys’ High School. Travelling to Europe at age 18, he studied at the Central School of Speech Training and Dramatic Art and teaching at the University of London.

He was at one time the lover of the English author, journalist, and broadcaster Colin Spencer. They met in Brighton in 1957, when both were 24 years old. Their off-and-on two-year relationship dramatically changed when Spencer married archaeologist Gillian Chapman in October 1959. Returning to Australia, Tasker became a theatre director, and died of cancer in 1988. Tasker had arranged for his letters to be returned to Spencer. Upon re-reading them, Spencer published his book Which of Us Two as a form of atonement.

Patrick White chose Tasker to produce the play The Ham Funeral for the University of Adelaide Theatre Guild (premiere in Union Hall in 1961). White's life partner Manoly Lascaris acknowledged Tasker as the 'virus' that re-infected White with the excitement of theatre. The Sydney Theatre Critics' Circle named their annual award for best freelance director after him.

== Theatre productions ==
(incomplete list):
1961 - The Break
1961 - The Ham Funeral, by Patrick White (Union Hall)
1962 - The Good Woman of Setzuan, by Bertolt Brecht (Union Hall)
1962 - The Season at Sarsaparilla, by Patrick White (Union Hall)
1963 - Oedipus Rex, by Sophocles (Union Hall)
1964 - Night on Bald Mountain, by Patrick White (Union Hall)
1965 - The Representative, by Rolf Hochhuth (Union Hall)
1965 - Inadmissible Evidence, by
1968 - America Hurrah, by Van Itallie (New Theatre)
1968 - The Boys in the Band, by Mart Crowley (the Playbox)
1969 - Candy Stripe Balloon, revue starring Grahame Bond (Phillip Theatre)
1977 - Don't Piddle against the Wind, Mate, by Kenneth Ross (Jane Street Theater)
1978 - The Cassidy Album. (York Theatre)
1978 - The Good Woman of Setzuan (Port Moresby Theatre Group, PNG)
1979 - Rusty Bugles, by Sumner Locke Elliott (New Theatre)
1981 - The Workroom, by Tom Kempinski (New Theatre)
1982 - The Samseng and The Chettiars’ Daughter (Singapore)
1982 - Duet for One, by Tom Kempinski (Marian Street)
1983 - Caravan, by Donald Macdonald (Marian Street)
1986 - Absurd Person Singular, by Alan Ayckbourn (Northside)
1987 - As Is, by William Hoffman (Seymour Downstairs)

== Opera productions ==
1974 The Excursions of Mr Broucek (Janacek) Adelaide Festival Theatre - New Opera

1976 - The Consul (Canberra Theatre)
1979 - La Belle Hélène (Canberra Theatre)
