= Anna Goldsworthy =

Australian writer, teacher and classical pianist

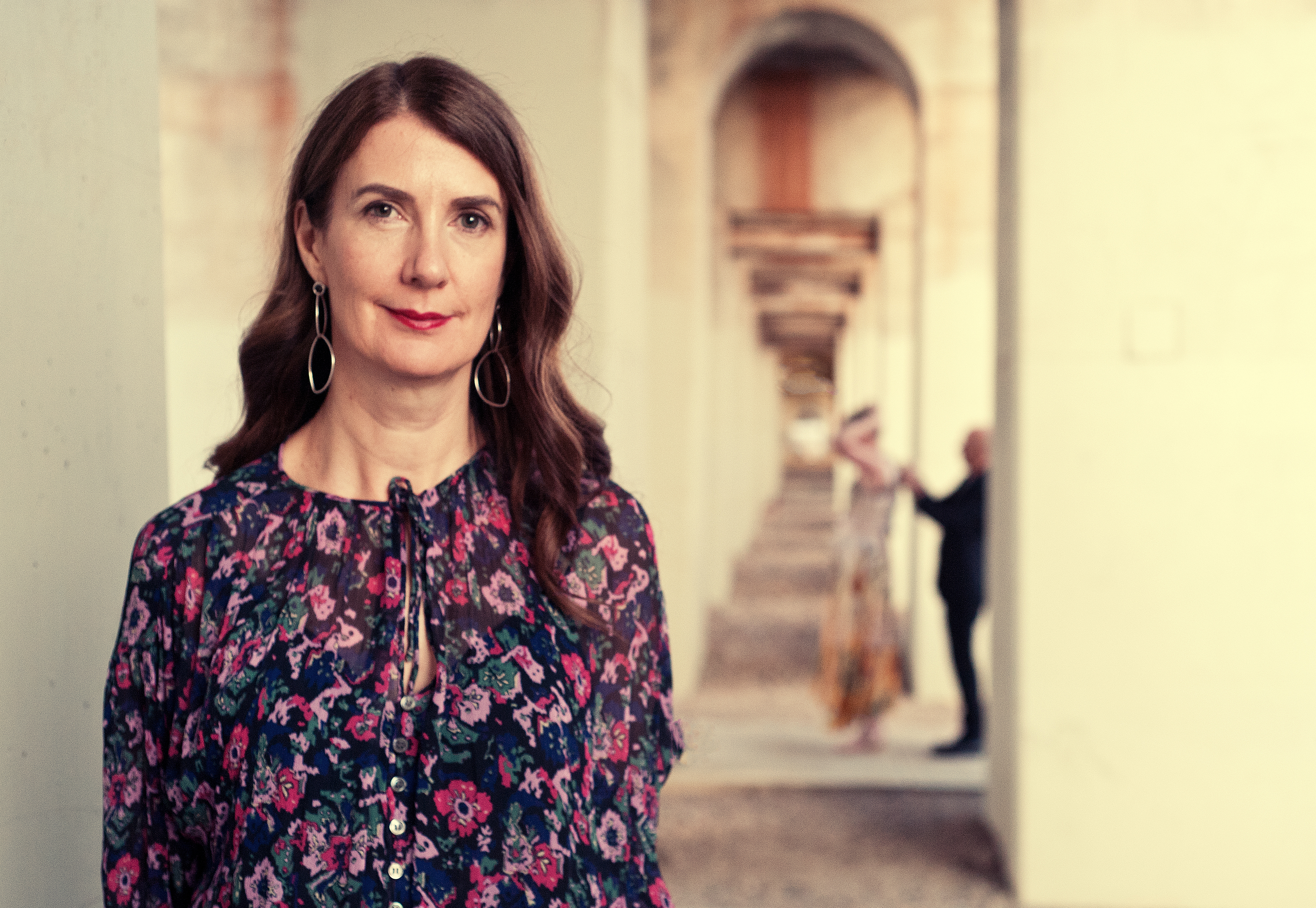
- Goldsworthy in 2024
- Born: Adelaide
- Education: B. Mus. (Hons), Elder Conservatorium; M. Mus., Texas Christian University; D. Mus. Arts, University of Melbourne
- Notable work: Piano Lessons
- Parent(s): Helen and Peter Goldsworthy
- Website: www.annagoldsworthy.com

Anna Louise Goldsworthy is an Australian classical pianist, writer, academic, playwright, and librettist, known for her 2009 memoir Piano Lessons. She has held several academic positions, and as of 2023 is director of the Elder Conservatorium at the University of Adelaide. She is a founder member of the Seraphim Trio, which has toured Australia and the world since 1995.

She is the daughter of writer Peter Goldsworthy.

== Early life and education ==
Anna Louise Goldsworthy was born in Adelaide, South Australia, the eldest daughter of the writer Peter Goldsworthy and Helen Goldsworthy, who graduated with a degree in medicine from the University of Adelaide.

She began studying the piano at the age of six. At the age of eleven she was accepted into the Elder Conservatorium (part of Adelaide University), studying with the pedagogue Eleonora Sivan, to whom she attributes the fact that she is now a pianist. Goldsworthy completed her Bachelor of Music degree with honours at the Elder Conservatorium before acquiring a Master of Music degree at Texas Christian University, where she held the F. Howard and Mary D. Walsh Graduate Piano Scholarship and studied with Tamás Ungár.

She joined the Advanced Performance Program at the Australian National Academy of Music (ANAM) in Melbourne in 1999. Here she was mentored by Stephen McIntyre (an association which led to her later assuming the role of artistic director at the Port Fairy Spring Music Festival).

In 2004, Goldsworthy graduated from the University of Melbourne with a Doctor of Musical Arts degree under the supervision of Ronald Farren-Price. Her thesis topic was "Fanny Hensel and Virtuosity".

Goldsworthy has studied in Moscow with Lev Naumov with the support of an Arts SA Emerging Artist Award.

== Music ==
Goldsworthy has stated that the highlights of her career have included solo piano appearances at the Teatro Colón in the Buenos Aires; for the Orchestra of Colours in Athens, Greece; at the Melbourne International Arts Festival; and in the Adelaide Symphony Orchestra's Masters Series.

In 2009 Goldsworthy was a juror for Chamber Music Australia's Asia-Pacific Chamber Music Competition.

Her debut solo CD, Come With Us, was released by ABC Classics in January 2008. It comprises performances by Goldsworthy from a 2004 world tour.

In July 2010 she recorded for ABC Classics the music that features in her book Piano Lessons.

=== Seraphim Trio ===
Goldsworthy is a founding member of the musical trio Seraphim Trio, established in 1995. Since 1998 and as of May 2026, the trio consists of Helen Ayres on violin, Timothy Nankervis on cello, and Goldsworthy on piano. Seraphim Trio has performed throughout Asia and Europe, and appears regularly in Australia for Musica Viva. They play regularly at Elder Hall in Adelaide, Epsom House near Hobart in Tasmania, and the Melbourne Recital Centre.

The trio studied chamber music with Hatto Beyerle at the Hochschule für Musik, Theater und Medien Hannover.

In 2001, the trio won the trio and audience choice prizes in the Australian National Chamber Music Competition (forerunner to the Asia-Pacific Chamber Music Competition).

In 2007, they launched a national concert series. In March 2010 Seraphim Trio recorded Schubert's Trout Quintet for ABC Classics.

In 2019, Seraphim Trio released the CD Thirteen Ways to Look at Birds, with Paul Kelly, James Ledger, and Alice Keath, which won an ARIA Award. In the same year, the trio released a multi-CD set Trio Through Time, which followed the history of the piano trio from Mozart and Haydn until the present day.

== Writing ==
Goldsworthy has published numerous essays on music and cultural issues, including many articles for The Monthly.

Her memoir Piano Lessons was released by Black Inc in Australia in September 2009, and internationally by Macmillan in 2010.

It was shortlisted in the 2010 New South Wales Premier's Literary Awards for Best Non-Fiction and in the 2010 Australian Book Industry Awards in the categories of Best Non-Fiction and the Newcomer of the Year, winning the latter. The book was sold to St. Martin's Press in the U.S., and the film rights to the book were sold to director Ana Kokkinos in 2010.

Goldsworthy is credited alongside her father, Peter Goldsworthy, as writing the stage adaptation of Maestro which the State Theatre Company of South Australia performed in 2009.

Piano Lessons was adapted by Goldsworthy, commissioned by the Queensland Music Festival (with Deborah Conway at the helm) in August 2011. Goldsworthy played herself in the production, which was staged at the Cremorne Theatre at QPAC before touring the state.

Welcome to Your New Life, also a memoir, was released by Black Inc in March 2013. Goldsworthy adapted it for the stage for the State Theatre Company South Australia's closing play for the 2023 season, an idea raised by artistic director Mitchell Butel.

Goldsworthy wrote a cabaret show, Cole, performed by Michael Griffiths at the Festival Theatre, Adelaide in the Adelaide Cabaret Festival in June 2015, for which he won a Helpmann Award for Best Cabaret Performer in 2016. The show, which showcased the music of Cole Porter and Peter Allen, was again performed in 2020 at the Regal Theatre, Adelaide.

She published her third book, Melting Moments, her first work of fiction, on 3 March 2020. It is a domestic book set in South Australia beginning in 1941, with the main character, Ruby, who travels to Adelaide. It was officially released at the 2020 Adelaide Writers' Week, with an interview of Goldsworthy and Black Inc. author Anna Krien, who discussed how it felt going from "fact to fiction".

Goldsworthy wrote the libretto for Victorian Opera's award-winning production of The Magic Pudding, staged in October 2013. She wrote the libretto for their December 2022 production of A Christmas Carol.

== Academic positions ==
From at least 2009 and until 2011 or later Goldsworthy was teaching piano at the University of Melbourne. She returned to Adelaide in 2013, and took up a post at the J.M. Coetzee Centre for Creative Practice at the University of Adelaide As of August 2021, Goldworthy was director of the J.M. Coetzee Centre for Creative Practice.

Since 18 July 2022 and as of 2023 she is director of the Elder Conservatorium.

== Festival directorships ==
Goldsworthy was appointed artistic director of the Port Fairy Spring Music Festival in May 2009, succeeding her ANAM mentor Stephen McIntyre from 2010.

From 2019 she was artistic director of the Coriole Music Festival in McLaren Vale, until she was appointed director of the Elder Conservatorium of Music at the University of Adelaide in July 2022.

In 2022, she was director of the Hayllar Music and Mountains Festival in Queenstown, New Zealand, and co-curator of the Adelaide Symphony Orchestra's "She Speaks" festival with Anne Cawrse, a classical music festival with a focus on music written by female composers. She also co-curated the PianoLab festival with Anne Wiberg in 2022.

She has said of these directorships that she finds fulfilment in the caretaker or pastoral care role, of both people and music: "[giving] them opportunities to be themselves and to flourish, make contact with an audience – I really love doing that".

== Recognition and awards ==
=== Piano ===
- ?: Arts SA Emerging Artist Award
- Sometime before 2004: David Paul Landa Memorial Scholarship for Pianists
- 2009: Artist-in-residence at Janet Clarke Hall
- 2018?: Inaugural Kenneth Moore Memorial Music Scholar at Janet Clarke Hall, University of Melbourne

=== Writing ===
- 2010: Winner, Newcomer of the Year at the Australian Book Industry Awards (ABIA Awards), for Piano Lessons
- 2010: Shortlisted, Best Writing Award (in the Melbourne Prize for Literature awards), for Piano Lessons
- 2010: Shortlisted, ABIA Awards for Best Non-Fiction, for Piano Lessons
- 2010: Shortlisted, New South Wales Premier's Literary Awards Douglas Stewart Prize for Non-Fiction, for Piano Lessons
- 2011: Shortlisted, National Biography Award, for Piano Lessons
- 201?: Nominated, Matilda Award, for stage adaption of Piano Lessons
- 2020: Shortlisted, Colin Roderick Award
- 2021: Shortlisted, Colin Roderick Award
- 2021: Awarded a linkage grant by the Australian Research Council "to undertake research to find new ways of tackling the challenges facing the Australian performing arts sector in the wake of the COVID-19 pandemic and climate change emergency"

== Music-writing relationship ==
In an interview with Adelaide paper CityMag, Goldsworthy expressed some of her beliefs about the arts and her feelings about her work:

One of the beautiful things about music is it's fundamentally non-materialist. You create something that vanishes into the air and it's about the moment, its about the connection, it's about sitting in that Hall [Elder Hall], for instance, and collectively inhabiting the space.

I think I used to really cut myself up thinking I have to choose between music and writing, mostly because of time... I used to think I had to choose but as time goes on, the more I think I can't. They do speak to each other and I love them both and I love projects in which I can bring the two of them together.

What I find so restorative about the classical music tradition is I think there's an idealism and even a sincerity and earnestness at its hub and I think those things have become a bit of a casualty of modern life. It's very easy, and I’ve found it very easy in my own writing, to be paralysed by irony and trying to be too clever by half and in some ways music has taught me how to reveal more of myself in my writing and be more comfortable with being more naked in my writing.

== Personal life ==
Goldsworthy has two siblings, and two children.

== Selected works ==
Goldsworthy is the author of numerous published articles, essays, and books.

=== Books ===
- Goldsworthy, Anna (2011). Piano Lessons. Collingwood, Victoria: Black Inc. ISBN 9781863955355.
- — (2014). Welcome to Your New Life. Collingwood, Victoria: Black Inc. ISBN 9781863956451.
- —, ed. (2017). The Best Australian Essays 2017. Black Inc. ISBN 9781863959605.
- — (2020). Melting Moments. Collingwood, Victoria: Black Inc. ISBN 9781743820858.

=== Essays and reporting ===
- Numerous articles in The Monthly
- "Unfinished Business: Sex, Freedom and Misogyny" in Quarterly Essay, no. 50, June 2013 ISBN 9781863956024
