= 1909 University of New Mexico football team =

American college football season

1909 University of New Mexico football
- Conference: Independent
- Record: 4–2
- Head coach: Sam P. McBirney (1st season)
- Home stadium: Traction Park

1909 Western college football independents records
	Conf.			Overall
Team	W	L	T	W		L		T
St. Vincent's		–		6	–	0	–	0
Montana		–		6	–	0	–	1
Utah		–		4	–	1	–	0
Denver		–		7	–	2	–	0
Arizona		–		3	–	1	–	0
New Mexico		–		4	–	2	–	0
USC		–		3	–	1	–	2
Hawaii		–		2	–	2	–	0
Utah Agricultural		–		2	–	2	–	1
Wyoming		–		3	–	5	–	0
New Mexico A&M		–		1	–	3	–	1
Montana Agricultural		–		0	–	6	–	1

The 1909 University of New Mexico football team was an American football team that represented the University of New Mexico as an independent during the 1909 college football season. The team compiled a 4–2 record and outscored opponents by a total of 117 to 75. Walter R. Allen was the team captain.

In September 1909, the school hired Sam P. McBirney as its head football coach. McBirnie was a resident of Tulsa, Oklahoma, who had coached an Oklahoma football team in 1908 and was regularly employed as a cashier at the Tulsa National Bank. After six weeks in Albuquerque, McBirnie returned to his home in Tulsa. Assistant coach Hamilton H. Conwell and Hugh J. Collins took over the coaching responsibilities for the final game of the season against New Mexico A&M.

In a season of highs and lows, the team achieved both its greatest margin of victory (51–0 over New Mexico A&M) and its greatest margin of defeat (0–53 against Colorado) to that point in program history.

At the end of the season, University of New Mexico players won six of eleven spots on the All-New Mexico football team: Silva at center; "Doc" Cornish at quarterback; McConnell at right tackle; Price at left tackle; Galles at end; and Walt Allen at right halfback.

== Schedule ==
Date	Time	Opponent	Site	Result	Attendance	Source
October 26		at El Paso Military Institute	Washington Park; El Paso, TX	L 0–11		
October 30		El Paso Military Institute	Traction Park; Albuquerque, New Mexico Territory	W 15–0		
November 6		at Colorado	Gamble Field; Boulder, CO	L 0–53	1,500	
November 13		New Mexico Military	Traction Park; Albuquerque, New Mexico Territory	W 28–2	> 600	
November 25		at Arizona	Tucson, Arizona Territory (rivalry)	W 23–11	1,500	
December 3	2:40 p.m.	New Mexico A&M	Traction Park; Albuquerque, New Mexico Territory (rivalry)	W 51–0	1,000	
