= Peter Goldsworthy =

Australian writer and medical practitioner (born 1951)

Peter Goldsworthy AM
- Born: 1951 (age 74–75); Minlaton, South Australia
- Education: University of Adelaide (MBBS, 1974)
- Relatives: Anna Goldsworthy (daughter)
- Website: www.petergoldsworthy.com

Peter David Goldsworthy AM (born 1951) is an Australian writer and medical practitioner. He has won major awards for his short stories, poetry, novels, and opera libretti. He is known for his novels Maestro, Honk If You Are Jesus, and Three Dog Night.

Goldsworthy began his writing life as a poet, as described in his 2013 comic memoir, His Stupid Boyhood, and regards poetic principles as the basis of all his writing.

== Early life and education ==
Peter David Goldsworthy was born in 1951 in Minlaton, South Australia, and grew up in various Australian country towns, including Penola. He completed his schooling in Darwin in the Northern Territory.

He graduated from the University of Adelaide in 1974 with a degree in medicine.

== Early career ==
Goldsworthy worked in alcohol and drug rehabilitation for several years after graduation, but, with his poetry being published in Westerly and the Friendly Street Poetry Reader, he started dividing his working time equally between general practice and writing.

== Writing career ==
Goldsworthy's novels have sold hundreds of thousands of copies in Australia, and, with his poetry and short stories, have been translated into many European and Asian languages.

He has won major literary prizes across most genres: for poetry, the short story, the novel, plays and opera.

=== Novels ===
His first novel Maestro (1989), was loosely based on observations acquired by attending his daughter Anna's piano lessons with Russian emigre pianist Eleonora Sivan (born 1941), who had moved to Adelaide in 1981 as a refugee. The novel was reissued as part of the Angus & Robertson Australian Classics series, and was voted one of the Top 40 Australian books of all time by members of the Australian Society of Authors.

His 1995 novel Wish was also recently reissued in the Text Publishing Text Classics series. His 1992 novel Honk If You Are Jesus was reissued by the Untapped: Australian Literary Heritage Project in 2022.

Three Dog Night won the 2004 FAW Christina Stead Award, and was long-listed for the International IMPAC Dublin Literary Award.

His first novel in ten years, Minotaur, was published in 2019.

His novels have been widely translated, and adapted for the stage.

=== Poetry ===
The Australian expatriate writer Clive James comments that Goldsworthy's poetry is often seen as a sideline, but argues that it is "at the centre of his achievement". James writes:

His precise wit operates on every level, from the sonic (a concealed dove really does say hidden here, hidden here) to the conceptual (the human body really is packed tight like an attempt on the record of filling a Mini). The general impression is of a fastidious insistence that the particular comes first, and any general comment that follows had better be particular too.

Goldsworthy's poetry has been widely published in the English-speaking world, from journals such as Poetry and the London Review of Books to anthologies ranging from The Twentieth Century in Poetry to Roger McGough's recently edited Happy Poems. His New Selected Poems was published in Australia and the UK in 2001; his Collected Stories appeared in Australia in 2004.

Goldsworthy has been described in A Reader's Guide to Contemporary Australian Poetry as "one of the most skilled and satisfying poets in Australia" and by fellow Australian poet Les Murray as "a poet of crystalline intelligence, but one who can move as well as shine".

The Poetry Archive describes his poetry as follows:

There's a pressing sense of mortality in his work and a desire to ask the big questions, even as he satirises them. Drawn to the discipline of science, Goldsworthy's poems are full of the language of the laboratory—matter, evidence, elements, chemicals—the stuff we are made of, but at the same time frustrated by these limitations into asking what else we might be. He's interested in 'The Dark Side of the Head', the things we can only know in flashes, like glimpsing a skink, but he also retains a rationalist's scepticism of the ecstatic – that "thoughtlessly exquisite" evening sky in 'Sunset' won't fool him into rapture.

The Oxford Companion to Twentieth Century Poetry summarises his work thus: "in every line the poet strives to make language elegant enough to do justice to the world as comedy."

=== Short stories ===
Goldsworthy has published five collections of short stories, including The List of All Answers: Collected Stories, in 2004. The 1992 collection, Little Deaths, was shortlisted for the Christina Stead Award, the Steele Rudd Award, and the SA Premier's prize for fiction. His most recent collection, Gravel, was short-listed for the ASAL Gold Medal. As with his poetry, his stories have been widely anthologised in Australia and overseas. In Australian Short Fiction: a History, Bruce Bennett wrote that "No Australian author has written more convincingly about the power of hormones or the fear of death".

=== Libretti ===
Goldsworthy also writes opera libretti. He wrote the libretti for the Richard Mills operas, Summer of the Seventeenth Doll and Batavia, the latter winning Mills and Goldsworthy the 2002 Helpmann Award for Best Opera and Best New Australian Work. The premiere at the Sydney Opera House on 19 August 2006 was conducted by the composer and attended by the librettist.

He wrote the chamber opera, The ringtone cycle : for soprano, violin, cello, piano, and iPhone with composer Graeme Koehne. Ned Kelly, a new opera written with composer Luke Styles, was premiered by Lost & Found Opera at the Perth Festival in 2019.

=== Film writing ===
Goldsworthy co-wrote the script to the films:

- Ebbtide (1994)
- Passion (1999)

== Other roles ==
Goldsworthy has been chair of the Libraries Board of South Australia, and in 2001 was appointed chair of the Australia Council's Literature Board.

== Adaptations of his works ==
His novels Maestro, Wish, Honk If You Are Jesus, Jesus Wants Me for a Sunbeam and Three Dog Night have been adapted for the stage. Honk was premiered by the State Theatre Company of South Australia in its 2006 season. It won the 2006 Ruby Award for Best New Work, and the 2006 Advertiser Oscart Award for Best Play.

Humphrey Bower's award-winning adaptation of Wish for his company, Night Train, had subsequent seasons with the Perth Theatre Company, and in Canada with Edmonton's Northern Lights. Petra Kalive's adaptation of Three Dog Night was premiered at fortyfivedownstairs in Melbourne, and also performed in the Adelaide Festival Centre's Space Theatre.

Steve Rogers' adaptation of the novella Jesus Wants Me for a Sunbeam won the inaugural Lysicrates Prize in 2015, and premiered at the National Theatre of Parramatta in 2018, directed by Darren Yap. The play was restaged by Belvoir Theatre Company in February 2020.

The short story The Kiss was adapted for stage at Belvoir St Theatre, along with short stories of the same name by Chekhov, Maupassant and Kate Chopin. The Kiss was also made into a multi-award-winning short film by Ashlee Page.

In 2009, Honk If You Are Jesus was adapted as a radio play by Mike Ladd for ABC Radio National and was broadcast by the BBC World Service. The novella Jesus Wants Me for a Sunbeam has also been adapted as a radio-play by Mike Ladd for the ABC.

Goldsworthy's poetry has been set to music by leading Australian composers, including Graeme Koehne, Richard Mills, Anne Cawrse, Paul Stanhope, and Matthew Hindson.

== Awards and nominations ==
- 1979: Western Australian Sesquicentenary Literary Prize for the short-story Memoirs of a small 'm' marxist
- 1982: Commonwealth Poetry Prize, for Readings from Ecclesiastes
- 1982: FAW Anne Elder Award, joint winner for Readings from Ecclesiastes
- 1982: South Australian Premier's Award, for Readings from Ecclesiastes
- 1984: Government Biennial Literature Prize (South Australia), for Readings from Ecclesiastes
- 1988: Australian Bicentennial Prize for Poetry, the Grace Perry Prize, for This Goes With This
- 1991: NBC Banjo Awards, NBC Turnbull Fox Phillips Poetry Prize, shortlisted for This Goes with That
- 1998: ABC / ABA Bicentennial Literary Award, Poetry Australia Literary Award
- 2002: Robert Helpmann Award for Best Opera and Best New Australian Work for Batavia
- 2002: Green Room Award for Special Creative Achievement for Batavia
- 2003: Colin Roderick Award, shortlisted for Three Dog Night
- 2004: Miles Franklin Award, Shortlisted for Three Dog Night
- 2004: FAW Christina Stead Award for Three Dog Night
- 2004: Courier-Mail Book of the Year, shortlisted for Three Dog Night
- 2004: Queensland Premier's Literary Awards, shortlisted for Three Dog Night
- 2004: New South Wales Premier's Literary Awards, shortlisted for Three Dog Night
- 2005: International IMPAC Dublin Literary Award, longlisted for Three Dog Night
- 2009: Prime Minister's Literary Awards, shortlisted, for Everything I Knew
- 2010: Member of the Order of Australia, "For service to literature as an author and poet, through arts administration, and to the community"

== Personal life ==
Goldsworthy's eldest daughter Anna Goldsworthy is a successful concert pianist as well as an accomplished writer. They worked together on a stage adaptation of Goldsworthy's novel Maestro.

== Selected works ==
=== Novels and novellas ===
- Maestro (1989)
- Magpie (1992)
- Honk If You are Jesus (1992)
- Jesus Wants Me for a Sunbeam (1993)
- Wish (1995)
- Keep it Simple, Stupid (1996)
- Three Dog Night (2003)
- Everything I Knew (2008)
- The Kiss (2012)
- Minotaur (2019)

=== Poetry collections ===
- Readings from Ecclesiastes (1982)
- This Goes with That: Selected Poems 1970–1990 (1991)
- After the Ball (1992)
- If, Then: Poems and Songs (1996)
- New Selected Poems (2001)
- Tattered Joys (2002)
- The Rise of the Machines and other Love Poems (2015)
- Anatomy of a Metaphor (2017)

=== Short story collections ===
- Archipelagoes (1982)
- Zooing (1986)
- Bleak Rooms (1988)
- Little Deaths (1993)
- One of My Best Friends (1994)
- Navel Gazing: Essays, Half Truths and Mystery Flights (1998)
- The List of All Answers (2004)
- Gravel (2010)

=== Non-fiction ===
- Navel Gazing (Essays, 1996)
- His Stupid Boyhood: A Memoir (2013)
- "Salman's throat : living with cancer and a fatwa". Commentary. Australian Book Review. 447: 36. October 2022. (extract from forthcoming book The Cancer Finishing School)
- The Cancer Finishing School (2024)

=== Critical studies and reviews ===
- Reimer, Andrew (1994). The Ironic Eye: The Poetry and Prose of Peter Goldsworthy. New South Wales: Angus & Robertson. ISBN 0207182507.
- Gilling, Tom (June 2014). "Peter Goldsworthy". Celebration. Australian Authors Past & Present. Australian Author. 46 (1): 28–31.
