= 1909 Denver Ministers football team =

American college football season

1909 Denver Ministers football
- Conference: Independent
- Record: 7–2
- Head coach: John P. Koehler (4th season)
- Home stadium: University Park Field

1909 Western college football independents records
	Conf.			Overall
Team	W	L	T	W		L		T
St. Vincent's		–		6	–	0	–	0
Montana		–		6	–	0	–	1
Utah		–		4	–	1	–	0
Denver		–		7	–	2	–	0
Arizona		–		3	–	1	–	0
New Mexico		–		4	–	2	–	0
USC		–		3	–	1	–	2
Hawaii		–		2	–	2	–	0
Utah Agricultural		–		2	–	2	–	1
Wyoming		–		3	–	5	–	0
New Mexico A&M		–		1	–	3	–	1

The 1909 Denver Ministers football team represented the University of Denver as an independent during the 1909 college football season. In their fourth season under head coach John P. Koehler, the Ministers compiled a 7–2 record, allowed an average of 3.4 points per game, and outscored all opponents by a total of 177 to 31.

== Schedule ==
Date	Time	Opponent	Site	Result	Attendance	Source
September 25		Longmont High School	Denver, CO	W 6–0		
October 9		Wyoming	Denver, CO	W 56–0		
October 16		Washburn	Denver, CO	W 30–5		
October 23		South Dakota	Denver, CO	W 10–0		
November 6		at Colorado Mines	Golden, CO	W 25–0		
November 13		Haskell	Denver, CO	L 5–8		
November 20		Nebraska	Denver, CO	L 5–6		
November 25		Colorado College	University Park Field; Denver, CO	W 29–6	4,000	
December 4	2:00 p.m.	at Washington State	Recreation Park; Spokane, WA	W 11–6	2,000	
