= 1909 Wyoming Cowboys football team =

American college football season

1909 Wyoming Cowboys football
- Conference: Independent
- Record: 3–5
- Head coach: Harold I. Dean (1st season)
- Home stadium: M. E. Corthell

1909 Western college football independents records
	Conf.			Overall
Team	W	L	T	W		L		T
St. Vincent's		–		6	–	0	–	0
Montana		–		6	–	0	–	1
Utah		–		4	–	1	–	0
Denver		–		7	–	2	–	0
Arizona		–		3	–	1	–	0
New Mexico		–		4	–	2	–	0
USC		–		3	–	1	–	2
Hawaii		–		2	–	2	–	0
Utah Agricultural		–		2	–	2	–	1
Wyoming		–		3	–	5	–	0
New Mexico A&M		–		1	–	3	–	1
Montana Agricultural		–		0	–	6	–	1

The 1909 Wyoming Cowboys football team represented the University of Wyoming as an independent during the 1909 college football season. In their first season under head coach Harold I. Dean, the team compiled a 3–5 record and was outscored by a total of 170 to 93. M. E. Corthell was the team captain

== Schedule ==
Date	Opponent	Site	Result	Source
October 2	at Cheyenne High School	Cheyenne, WY	W 30–0	
October 9	at Denver	Denver, CO	L 0–56	
October 12	Laramie High School	Laramie, WY	W 25–0	
October 16	at Colorado Agricultural	Durkee Field; Fort Collins, CO (rivalry)	L 3–32	
October 30	Colorado College	Laramie, WY	L 5–44	
November 6	at Fort Russell	Cheyenne, WY	L 6–15	
November 13	Fort Russell	Laramie, WY	W 18–0	
November 20	Colorado Mines	Laramie, WY	L 6–23	
