= 1909 St. Vincent's Saints football team =

American college football season

1909 St. Vincent's Saints football
- Conference: Independent
- Record: 6–0
- Head coach: Walter Rheinschild (1st season)
- Captain: Murray
- Home stadium: Fiesta Park

1909 Western college football independents records
| | Conf. | | | Overall |
| Team | W | L | T | W | | L | | T |
|---|---|---|---|---|---|---|---|---|
| St. Vincent's | | – | | 6 | – | 0 | – | 0 |
| Montana | | – | | 6 | – | 0 | – | 1 |
| Utah | | – | | 4 | – | 1 | – | 0 |
| Denver | | – | | 7 | – | 2 | – | 0 |
| Arizona | | – | | 3 | – | 1 | – | 0 |
| New Mexico | | – | | 4 | – | 2 | – | 0 |
| USC | | – | | 3 | – | 1 | – | 2 |
| Hawaii | | – | | 2 | – | 2 | – | 0 |
| Utah Agricultural | | – | | 2 | – | 2 | – | 1 |
| Wyoming | | – | | 3 | – | 5 | – | 0 |
| New Mexico A&M | | – | | 1 | – | 3 | – | 1 |
| Montana Agricultural | | – | | 0 | – | 6 | – | 1 |

The 1909 St. Vincent's Saints football team was an American football team that represented St. Vincent's College (now known as Loyola Marymount University) as an independent during the 1909 college football season. In their first and only season under head coach Walter Rheinschild, the team compiled a 6–0 record.

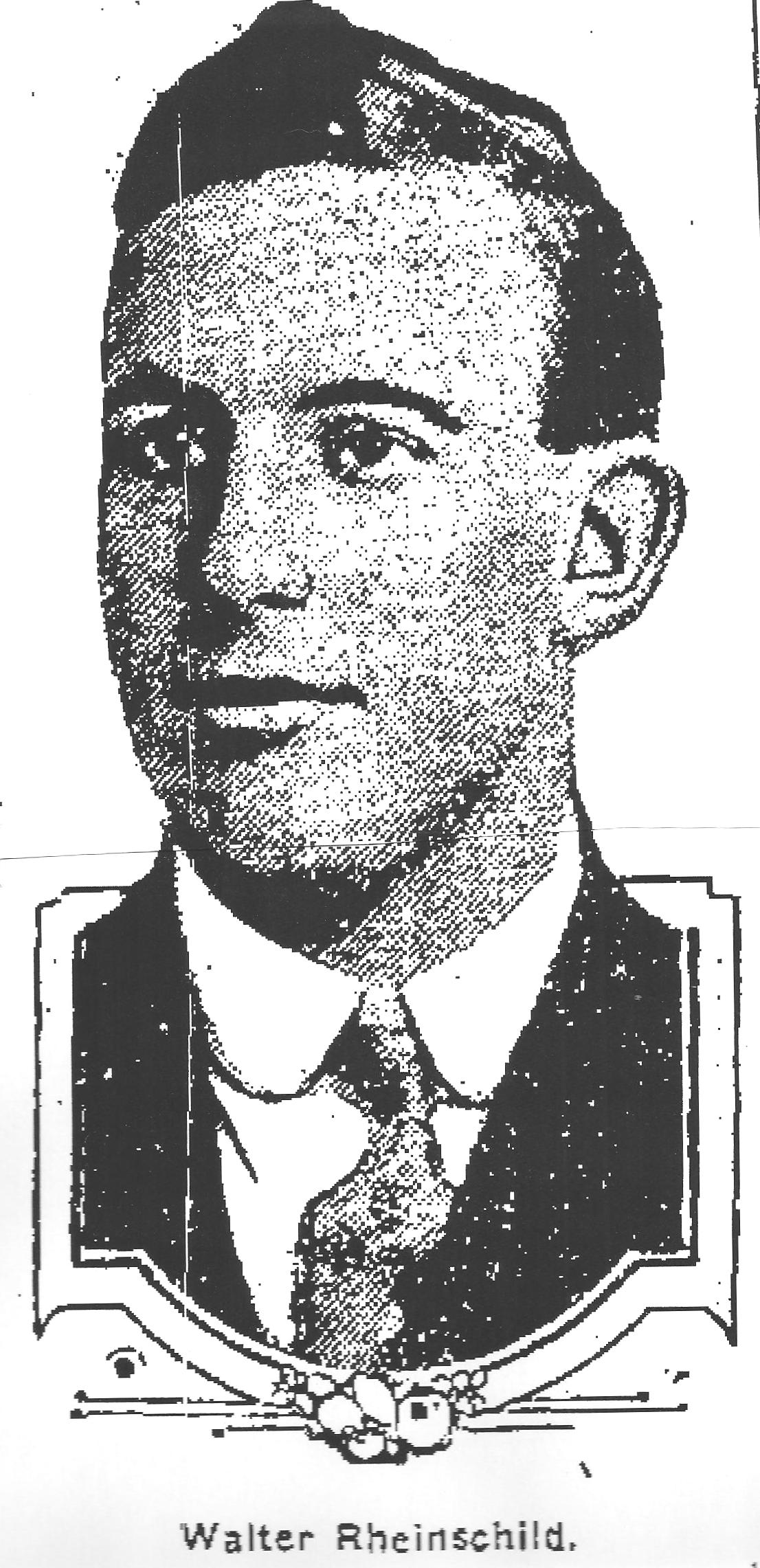
Image of Rheinschild from 1909 newspaper article announcing his hiring by St. Vincent's College

Rheinschild was a Southern California native who had gone east to play football for Michigan. He was hired in April 1909 as head football coach at St. Vincent's. He led St. Vincent's to an undefeated season and the football championship of Southern California in his one year as head coach. The Los Angeles Times praised Rheinschild's efforts in turning the St. Vincent's team into champions:

"Rheinschild has accomplished wonders with a squad which at the outset of the season appeared to be mediocre to an unusual degree. The Saints' athletic authorities are more than pleased with the success of 'Rheiny.' They expected the coach to clean up the Saint athletics and get a start for next year. 'Rheiny' did considerably more. He developed the strongest team the Saints ever had. And the eleven played clean ball too."

In 1910, St. Vincent's withdrew from participation in intercollegiate athletics, opting to confine athletics to the Catholic student body.

== Schedule ==
| Date | Opponent | Site | Result | Source |
|---|---|---|---|---|
| October 9 | vs. Santa Ana High School | Bovard Field; Los Angeles, CA | W 9–0 | |
| October 16 | at San Diego High School | San Diego, CA | W 29–0 | |
| October 23 | at USC | Bovard Field; Los Angeles, CA | W 8–6 | |
| October 30 | San Diego High School | Fiesta Park; Los Angeles, CA | W 63–0 | |
| November 25 | USC Law School | Fiesta Park; Los Angeles, CA | W 17–3 | |
| December 25 | All Stars | Fiesta Park; Los Angeles, CA | W 14–3 | |
