= 1909 University of Utah football team =

American college football season

1909 University of Utah football

Utah state champion
- Conference: Independent
- Record: 6–1
- Head coach: Joe Maddock (6th season)
- Captain: Jacob "Cuddy" Parley Russell
- Home stadium: Cummings Field

1909 Western college football independents records
	Conf.			Overall
Team	W	L	T	W		L		T
St. Vincent's		–		6	–	0	–	0
Montana		–		6	–	0	–	1
Utah		–		4	–	1	–	0
Denver		–		7	–	2	–	0
Arizona		–		3	–	1	–	0
New Mexico		–		4	–	2	–	0
USC		–		3	–	1	–	2
Hawaii		–		2	–	2	–	0
Utah Agricultural		–		2	–	2	–	1
Wyoming		–		3	–	5	–	0
New Mexico A&M		–		1	–	3	–	1
Montana Agricultural		–		0	–	6	–	1

The 1909 University of Utah football team was an American football team that represented the University of Utah as an independent during the 1909 college football season. In its sixth and final season under head coach Joe Maddock, the team compiled a 6–1 record, shut out five of seven opponents, and outscored all opponents by a total of 180 to 19. The team was recognized as the Utah state champion, and played its home games at Cummings Field in Salt Lake City.

== Schedule ==
Date	Opponent	Site	Result	Source
September 29	Granite High School†	Salt Lake City, UT	W 26–0	
October 2	at Ogden High School†	Ogden, UT	W 29–0	
October 9	at Utah Agricultural	Utah A.C. quad; Logan, UT (rivalry)	W 28–0	
October 23	at Colorado Mines	Union Park; Denver, CO	L 8–14	
October 30	Fort Douglas	Cummings Field; Salt Lake City, UT	W 21–5	
November 13	Montana Agricultural	Cummings Field; Salt Lake City, UT	W 46–0	
November 25	Utah Agricultural	Cummings Field; Salt Lake City, UT	W 22–0	
