= 1909 USC Methodists football team =

American college football season

1909 USC Methodists football
- Conference: Independent
- Record: 3–1–2
- Head coach: Dean Cromwell (1st season)
- Captain: Hal Paulin
- Home stadium: Bovard Field

1909 Western college football independents records
	Conf.			Overall
Team	W	L	T	W		L		T
St. Vincent's		–		6	–	0	–	0
Montana		–		6	–	0	–	1
Utah		–		4	–	1	–	0
Denver		–		7	–	2	–	0
Arizona		–		3	–	1	–	0
New Mexico		–		4	–	2	–	0
USC		–		3	–	1	–	2
Hawaii		–		2	–	2	–	0
Utah Agricultural		–		2	–	2	–	1
Wyoming		–		3	–	5	–	0
New Mexico A&M		–		1	–	3	–	1
Montana Agricultural		–		0	–	6	–	1

The 1909 USC Methodists football team was an American football team that represented the University of Southern California during the 1909 college football season. The team competed as an independent under head coach Dean Cromwell, compiling a 3–1–2 record.

== Schedule ==
Date	Time	Opponent	Site	Result	Attendance	Source
October 9		at Cal Poly	San Luis Obispo, CA	W 51–0		
October 16	2:30 p.m.	at Whittier	Hadley Field; Whittier, CA	W 22–2		
October 23		St. Vincent's (CA)	Bovard Field; Los Angeles, CA	L 6–8	1,200	
October 30	2:30 p.m.	Orange Athletic Club	Bovard Field; Los Angeles, CA	W 51–0		
November 6	2:30 p.m.	at Occidental	Baer Field; Los Angeles, CA	T 3–3	3,500	
November 13	2:30 p.m.	Pomona	Bovard Field; Los Angeles, CA	T 0–0		
