= 1909 Hawaii Fighting Deans football team =

American college football season

1909 Hawaii Fighting Deans football
- Conference: Independent
- Record: 2–2
- Head coach: Austin Jones (1st season)
- Captain: Leslie Clark

1909 Western college football independents records
	Conf.			Overall
Team	W	L	T	W		L		T
St. Vincent's		–		6	–	0	–	0
Montana		–		6	–	0	–	1
Utah		–		4	–	1	–	0
Denver		–		7	–	2	–	0
Arizona		–		3	–	1	–	0
New Mexico		–		4	–	2	–	0
USC		–		3	–	1	–	2
Hawaii		–		2	–	2	–	0
Utah Agricultural		–		2	–	2	–	1
Wyoming		–		3	–	5	–	0
New Mexico A&M		–		1	–	3	–	1
Montana Agricultural		–		0	–	6	–	1

The 1909 Hawaii Fighting Deans football team represented the College of Agriculture and Mechanic Arts of the Territory of Hawaiʻi—now known as the University of Hawaiʻi at Mānoa–as an independent during the 1909 college football season. In their first season under head coach Austin Jones, the Fighting Deans compiled a 2–2 record. Leslie Clark was the team captain.

== Schedule ==
Date	Time	Opponent	Site	Result	Attendance	Source
October 23	3:30 p.m.	vs. McKinley High School	Alexander Field; Honolulu, Territory of Hawaii	W 6–5	2,500	
October 30	3:30 p.m.	at Punahou College	Alexander Field; Honolulu, Territory of Hawaii	L 0–23		
November 13		McKinley High School	Honolulu, Territory of Hawaii	W 10–0		
November 20		at Punahou College	Alexander Field; Honolulu, Territory of Hawaii	L 0–11		
