= 1909 Utah Agricultural Aggies football team =

American college football season

1909 Utah Agricultural Aggies football
- Conference: Independent
- Record: 2–2–1
- Head coach: Clayton Teetzel (1st season)

1909 Western college football independents records
	Conf.			Overall
Team	W	L	T	W		L		T
St. Vincent's		–		6	–	0	–	0
Montana		–		6	–	0	–	1
Utah		–		4	–	1	–	0
Denver		–		7	–	2	–	0
Arizona		–		3	–	1	–	0
New Mexico		–		4	–	2	–	0
USC		–		3	–	1	–	2
Hawaii		–		2	–	2	–	0
Utah Agricultural		–		2	–	2	–	1
Wyoming		–		3	–	5	–	0
New Mexico A&M		–		1	–	3	–	1
Montana Agricultural		–		0	–	6	–	1

The 1909 Utah Agricultural Aggies football team was an American football team that represented Utah Agricultural College (later renamed Utah State University) during the 1909 college football season. In their first season under head coach Clayton Teetzel, the Aggies compiled a 2–2–1 record and were outscored by a total of 55 to 34.

Clayton Teetzel was hired as a coach at Utah Agricultural in May 1908. He coached the school's teams in basketball, baseball, track, wrestling, swimming and boxing. He took over as football coach in 1909 after Fred M. Walker left the position.

The players on the 1909 team included Holden (end), William Jones (end), John Paddock (end/fullback), Elmer or Edgar Brossard (tackle), August Nelson (tackle), David Robinson (guard), Vern Martineau (guard/tackle), Mack McCombs (center), Archie Egbert (quarterback/end), Vince Cardon (quarterback), Heber Hancock (halfback), Peterson (halfback/tackle), Frederick Froerer (halfback), Crookston (halfback), and William Batt (fullback/halfback/guard).

== Schedule ==
Date	Opponent	Site	Result	Attendance	Source
October 9	Utah	Logan, UT (rivalry)	L 0–28	2,000	
October 23	Logan All Stars	Logan, UT	W 22–5		
November 6	Fort Douglas	Logan, UT	W 12–0	>2,000	
November 15	Montana Agricultural	Logan, UT	T 0–0		
November 25	at Utah	Cummings Field; Salt Lake City, UT	L 0–22	>3,500	
