= Robert F. Goldsworthy =

American politician

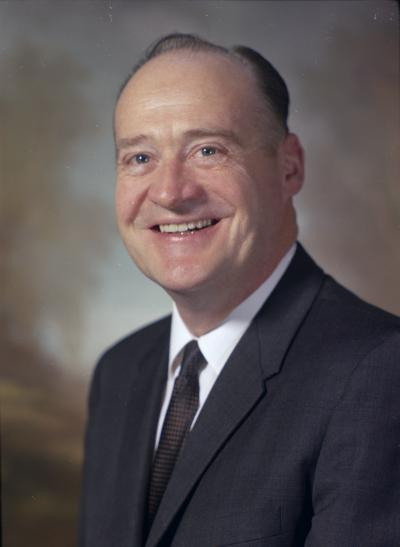
- Goldsworthy in 1967

Member of the Washington House of Representatives from the 9th district
- In office 1957–1973

Personal details
- Born: September 26, 1917 Spokane, Washington, U.S.
- Died: January 25, 2014 (aged 96) Spokane, Washington, U.S.
- Party: Republican
- Spouse: Jean Comegys (m. 1940)
- Relations: Harry E. Goldsworthy (brother)
- Parent: Harry Goldsworthy (father)
- Education: Washington State University

Military service
- Branch/service: United States Air Force
- Years of service: 1940–1975
- Rank: Major General
- Battles/wars: World War II; Korean War

Robert Flood Goldsworthy (September 26, 1917 – January 25, 2014) was a state legislator in the U.S. state of Washington. He was born in Spokane. He is also a retired major general in the United States Air Force. He served 9th district in the Washington House of Representatives from 1957 to 1973 as a Republican.

Goldsworthy served in the United States Air Force during World War II and the Korean War, and was kept as a prisoner of war in Japan during the former. He retired from the Air Force in 1975. He died at the age of 96 in January 2014. His wife, Jean died less than a year later, on January 15, 2015. They survived by her son Robert, her daughter Jill, their six grandchildren and eight great-grandchildren.
