= Nettie McBirney =

American food writer, inventor

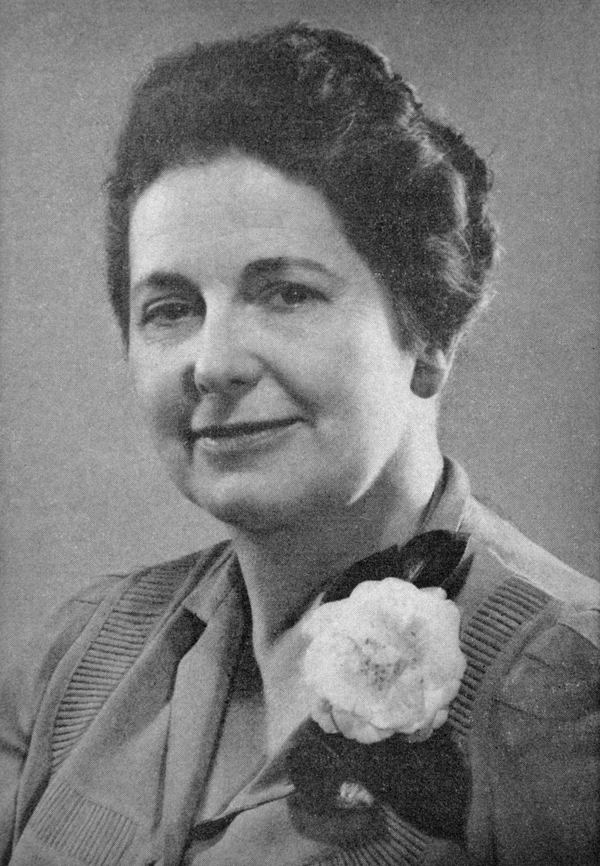
- Portrait of Nettie McBirney from her cookbook "Aunt Chick's Pies".
- Born: Nettie C. Williams; November 24, 1887
- Died: December 16, 1982 (aged 95); Tulsa, Oklahoma
- Other name: Aunt Chick
- Education: Stout Institute
- Occupation: food writer
- Spouse: Sam P. McBirney
- Children: 4

Nettie Williams McBirney (November 24, 1887 – December 16, 1982) was a Tulsa inventor, writer and entrepreneur, who wrote a cooking column under the pseudonym Aunt Chick for the Tulsa Daily World from 1935 to 1955.

== Biography ==
Born November 24, 1887, Nettie McBirney earned a home economics degree from the Stout Institute in Menomonie, Wisconsin. She moved to Claremore, Oklahoma in 1909 to teach home economics. Two years later, she became supervisor of home economics at Muskogee schools. After marrying Sam P. McBirney, coach of the University of Tulsa football team and vice president of the National Bank of Commerce, she settled in Tulsa in 1916.

In 1935, she approached Tulsa World editor N.G. Henthorne about writing a cooking column that contained simple advice and taught cooking techniques. "Kitchen Log" ran five times a week in the World through 1955. She also became a demonstration chef, first at Vandever's Department Store and other stores in Tulsa, and later in many other parts of the country.

McBirney began inventing kitchen aids during the Depression, such as a non-stick pastry canvas and rolling pin cover and a pie pan that promised perfect bottom crusts on pies. The invention she became best known for was her Cooky Molding Cutter, now known as Gramma's Cutter, a cookie cutter designed to easily release the molded cookie dough and maintain a 3-D appearance. She began selling them in 1948 and they quickly caught on; Princess Margaret purchased a set of the cookie cutters for Prince Charles in 1952, and Wrigley purchased, then sold 70,000 sets as a special promotion the same year.

=== Marriage and children ===
She married banker Sam P. McBirney in 1913. The couple had four children: Susan Bush, Williams, Samuel, and Mary Megan Bryan.

=== Death and afterward ===
McBirney died on December 16, 1982. Her collection of about 1,000 cookbooks was donated to the Tulsa City-County Library in 1973.

== Published works ==
While writing her Kitchen Log column, Aunt Chick also found time to write several cookbooks, most of which dealt with pies and other desserts. Most notable is Aunt Chick’s Pies, which sold over 650,000 copies.

=== Patents ===
- Piepan (US Pat. 2135782, filed Oct 10, 1936)
- Piepan (US Pat. 2179512, filed Oct 10, 1936)
- Cooky Molding Cutter (US Pat. 2596159, filed Aug 25, 1948)
- McBirney Cooky Molding Cutter (US Pat. D156549, filed Aug 25, 1948)
