= Piano Lessons (book) =

- Author: Anna Goldsworthy
- Language: English
- Subject: Classical music
- Genre: Autobiography, music
- Publisher: Black Inc
- Publication date: 2009
- Publication place: Australia, United States
- Media type: Hardcover, paperback, audiobook, e-book
- ISBN: 978-0-312-64628-8
- Dewey Decimal: 786.2 GOL

Piano Lessons is a 2009 award-winning non-fiction book by Australian classical pianist Anna Goldsworthy.

In Piano Lessons, Goldsworthy documents her piano study from a young age under the Russian emigre Eleonora Sivan.

== Synopsis ==
Goldsworthy was nine years old when she met Eleonora Sivan, a charismatic Russian émigré and world-class pianist who became her piano teacher. Piano Lessons documents what Sivan brought to Goldsworthy's lessons: a love of music, a respect for life, a generous spirit and the courage to embrace a musical life.

== Publication ==
Originally published in Australia in October 2009 by Black Inc, the US rights were sold to American publisher St. Martin's Press.

== Critical reception ==
The United States Poet Laureate, Philip Levine, said of Piano Lessons, "I have never read a better depiction of a great mentor and of how true learning takes place. Every teacher of anything should read this book. Twice."

The book was received positively by Australian critics.

James Kenny, writing in the Australian Literary Review, called Piano Lessons a "wonderful story, elegantly told".

Jo Case, writing in The Age, said that it was "multi-layered, rich with meditations on identity, creativity, ambition and achievement; deeply felt without a hint of sentimentality. This impressive debut will surely mark Anna Goldsworthy's arrival as an Australian writer to be reckoned with."

== Awards ==
Piano Lessons was shortlisted for a number of awards, including best non-fiction at the New South Wales Premier's Literary Awards and the 2010 Australian Book Industry Awards, and Goldsworthy won Newcomer of the Year at these awards.

== Adaptations ==
The film rights to the book were sold to director Ana Kokkinos in 2010.
