= 1909 New Mexico A&M Aggies football team =

American college football season

1909 New Mexico A&M Aggies football
- Conference: Independent
- Record: 1–3–1
- Head coach: John H. Squires (1st season)
- Home stadium: Miller Field

1909 Western college football independents records
	Conf.			Overall
Team	W	L	T	W		L		T
St. Vincent's		–		6	–	0	–	0
Montana		–		6	–	0	–	1
Utah		–		4	–	1	–	0
Denver		–		7	–	2	–	0
Arizona		–		3	–	1	–	0
New Mexico		–		4	–	2	–	0
USC		–		3	–	1	–	2
Hawaii		–		2	–	2	–	0
Utah Agricultural		–		2	–	2	–	1
Wyoming		–		3	–	5	–	0
New Mexico A&M		–		1	–	3	–	1
Montana Agricultural		–		0	–	6	–	1

The 1909 New Mexico A&M Aggies football team was an American football team that represented New Mexico College of Agriculture and Mechanic Arts (now known as New Mexico State University) as an independent during the 1909 college football season. In their first and only season under head coach John H. Squires, the Aggies compiled a 1–3–1 record. The team played its home games at Miller Field.

== Schedule ==
Date	Time	Opponent	Site	Result	Attendance	Source
		El Paso Military Institute	Mesilla Park, New Mexico Territory	T		
November 6		vs. Arizona	Washington Park; El Paso, TX	L 0–6		
November 13		New Mexico Mines	McFie Field; Mesilla Park, New Mexico Territory	W 17–0		
November 25		at New Mexico Military	Institute grounds; Roswell, New Mexico Territory	L 0–34		
December 3	2:40 p.m.	at New Mexico	Traction Park; Albuquerque, New Mexico Territory (rivalry)	L 0–51	1,000	
