= Harry E. Goldsworthy =

United States Air Force general (1914–2022)

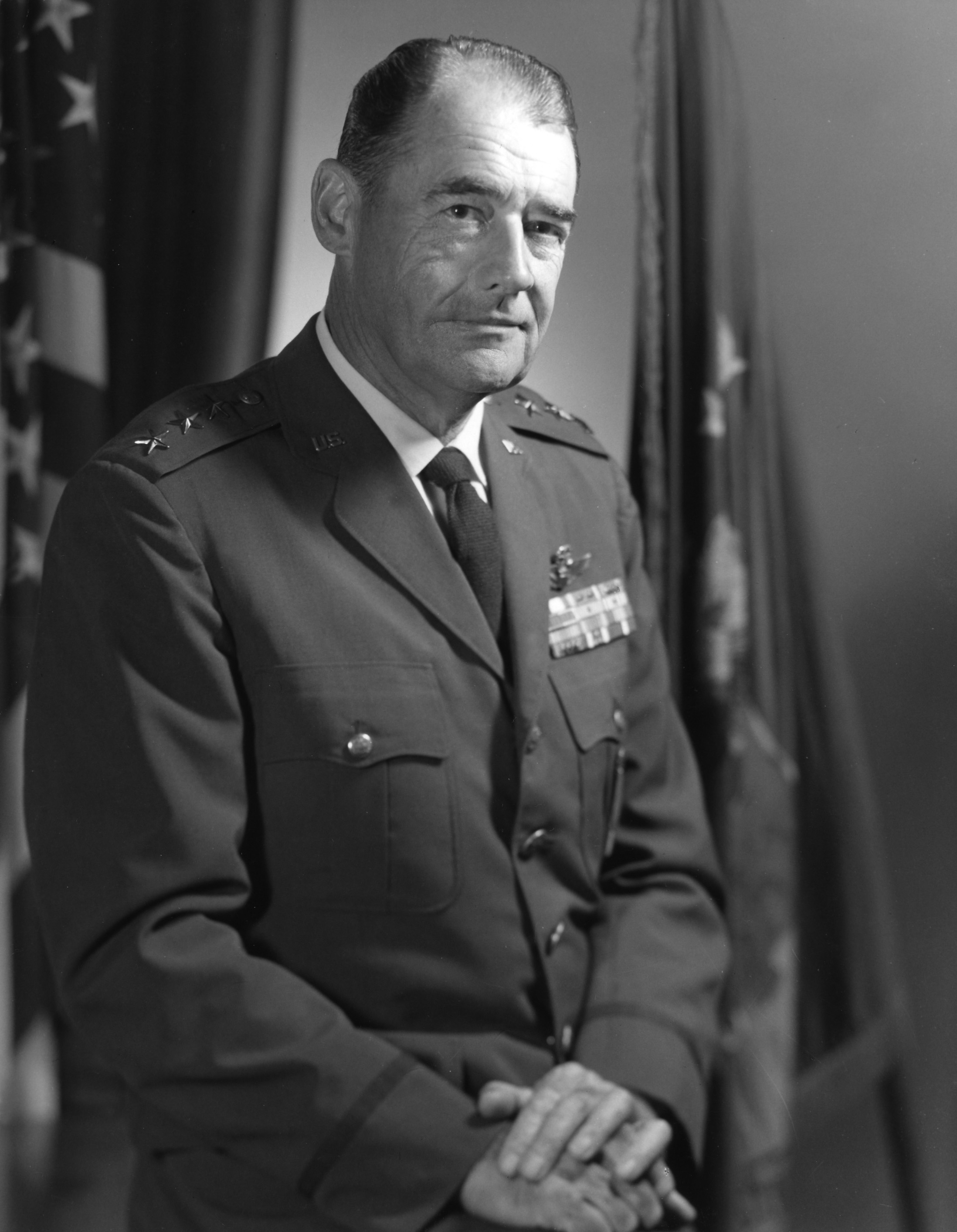
- Born: Harry Edgar Goldsworthy Jr. April 3, 1914; Spokane, Washington, U.S.
- Died: February 16, 2022 (aged 107); Riverside, California, U.S.
- Children: 2 sons
- Relatives: Harry Goldsworthy (father); Robert F. Goldsworthy (brother)
- Military career
- Allegiance: United States of America
- Branch: United States Air Force
- Service years: 1940–1973
- Rank: Lieutenant General
- Conflicts: World War II
- Awards: Air Force Distinguished Service Medal, Legion of Merit with two oak leaf clusters and the Air Medal with four oak leaf clusters

Harry Edgar Goldsworthy Jr. (April 3, 1914 – February 16, 2022) was a United States Air Force lieutenant general who was deputy chief of staff for systems and logistics, Headquarters U.S. Air Force, Washington, D.C. He was responsible for all Air Force logistics support which includes procurement policy, maintenance engineering, transportation, supply and services, and foreign military assistance and sales.

== Biography ==
Goldsworthy was born in Spokane, Washington, in 1914, and was raised on a farm near Rosalia, Washington. He graduated from Rosalia High School in 1931 and Washington State College in 1936 with a Bachelor of Arts degree in business administration and a commission as a second lieutenant, Infantry Reserve. After graduation he worked with the Equitable Life Assurance Society and the U.S. Soil Conservation Service until 1939 when he was accepted for flight training with the Army Air Corps.

His first assignment after graduation from flying school at Kelly Field, Texas in 1940 was at Langley Field, Virginia with the newly activated 25th Bombardment Group. The group was transferred to Borinquen Field, Puerto Rico in late 1940 and was stationed there at the start of World War II. He flew submarine patrol in the Puerto Rico and Trinidad area until 1943 when he was reassigned to a B-25 replacement training unit at Columbia, South Carolina. In July 1945 he went to the Southwest Pacific area and joined the 42d Bombardment Group. When the war ended, he was in Philippines as group commander.

After occupation duty in Japan, Goldsworthy returned to the United States in 1946 and was assigned to a B-29 unit at Davis-Monthan Field, Ariz. In December 1948 he became commander of the 1lth Bombardment Group, Carswell Air Force Base, Texas and, in July 1949, was transferred to Washington, D.C. as a member of the newly formed Weapons System Evaluation Group under the Joint Chiefs of Staff. In 1952 he entered the Army War College at Carlisle Barracks, Pennsylvania, and from 1953 to 1956, served as deputy chief of staff, operations, for the Air Proving Ground Command at Eglin Air Force Base, Florida. From 1956 to 1958 Goldsworthy served as inspector general and then as chief of staff of the Seventeenth Air Force in Morocco and Libya, earning the Legion of Merit during this period.

He attended the Industrial College of the Armed Forces, Washington, D.C. and, upon graduation in 1959, was assigned to Strategic Air Command as vice commander of the 4061st Air Refueling Wing at Malmstrom Air Force Base, Montana. In September 1960 he was transferred to the Ballistic Missiles Center of the Air Materiel Command and assigned as Site Activation Task Force commander for the first Minuteman Intercontinental Ballistic Missile Wing. Goldsworthy was assigned, in August 1963, as director of production and programming, Deputy Chief of Staff, Systems and Logistics, Headquarters U.S. Air Force, Washington, D.C. In June 1967 he assumed command of the Aeronautical Systems Division, AFSC, at Wright-Patterson Air Force Base, Ohio. In August 1969 Goldsworthy was assigned as deputy chief of staff for systems and logistics, Headquarters U.S. Air Force, Washington, D.C.

His military decorations and awards include the Air Force Distinguished Service Medal, Legion of Merit with two oak leaf clusters and the Air Medal with four oak leaf clusters. He was a command pilot.

== Personal life and death ==
By 1990, Goldsworthy resided in Riverside, California. He enjoyed golf. His wife, Edith Lyons Goldsworthy (1918–2010), died after 73 years of marriage. His brother was Robert F. Goldsworthy.

Goldsworthy turned 100 in April 2014, and died on February 16, 2022, at the age of 107.
