= List of undefeated NCAA Division I football teams =

This is a list of undefeated NCAA Division I football teams, which describes all teams that finished a college football season in the NCAA's Division I, or historic equivalent, without any losses.

== Division I Football Bowl Subdivision ==
NCAA Division I Football Bowl Subdivision (FBS) is the highest division of play in college football. However this nomenclature and these categories of divisional play have only existed since 2006 and 1978, respectively. Prior to the formation of the NCAA in 1906, there was no differentiation between the level of play from one college to another, and thus all intercollegiate teams can be thought of as having played in the same division. Likewise, even after the formation of the NCAA, there was no differentiation into divisions until 1956, when play was separated in the upper "University" division and lower "Collegiate" division. In 1973, a three division reorganization occurred placing teams into NCAA Division I (highest), Division II, or Division III (lowest). In 1978, Division I was further subdivided into Division I-A (highest) and Division I-AA. In 2006, these subdivisions were renamed Division I Football Bowl Subdivision (FBS) and Football Championship Subdivision (FCS), respectively.

The following categories represent the historical equivalents of the highest level of play over the history of college football, and the subsequent tables list the teams for each season that went undefeated while competing in these highest categories:

- uncategorized (pre-NCAA) 1869 to 1905
- NCAA 1906 to 1955
- NCAA University Division from 1956 until 1972
- NCAA Division I from 1973 to 1977
- NCAA Division I-A from 1978 to 2005
- NCAA Division I Football Bowl Subdivision (FBS) from 2006–present

=== Undefeated and untied ===
These teams finished the season having won every game in which they played, thus completing a "perfect season".

==== Pre-1900 ====
Year	Team	Record	Notes
1870	Princeton	1–0–0	
1872	Princeton	1–0–0	
1872	Yale	1–0–0	
1873	Princeton	1–0–0	
1874	Princeton	4–0–0	
1874	Yale	3–0–0	
1875	Harvard	4–0–0	
1875	Princeton	2–0–0	
1876	Rutgers	1–0–0	
1876	Yale	3–0–0	
1877	Amherst	1–0–0	
1878	Princeton	6–0–0	
1880	Michigan	1–0–0	
1881	Georgetown	1–0–0	
1881	Penn State	1–0–0	
1882	Michigan	1–0–0	
1882	Navy	1–0–0	
1882	Yale	8–0–0	
1883	California	2–0–0	
1883	Princeton	4–0–0	
1883	NYU	1–0–0	
1883	Albion	1–0–0	
1884	Michigan	2–0–0	
1884	Navy	1–0–0	
1884	Wabash	1–0–0	
1884	Yale	9–0–0	
1885	Albion	1–0–0	
1885	Michigan	3–0–0	Michigan was unscored upon
1885	Princeton	9–0–0	
1886	California	4–0–0	
1886	Fordham	1–0–0	
1886	Michigan	2–0–0	Michigan was unscored upon
1887	Michigan	3–0–0	Michigan was unscored upon
1887	Minnesota	2–0–0	Minnesota was unscored upon
1887	Penn State	2–0–0	Penn State was unscored upon
1887	Yale	9–0–0	
1887	Hanover	2–0–0	
1888	Colorado Mines	1–0–0	
1888	Notre Dame	1–0–0	
1888	USC	2–0–0	
1888	Yale	13–0–0	Yale was unscored upon
1889	Beloit	1–0–0	
1889	Butler	2–0–0	
1889	California	4–0–0	
1889	Colorado Mines	1–0–0	
1889	Miami (OH)	4–0–0	
1889	Notre Dame	1–0–0	
1889	Ohio State	1–0–0	
1889	Princeton	10–0–0	
1889	USC	2–0–0	
1889	Colorado Mines	6–0–0	
1890	Harvard	11–0–0	
1890	Kentucky State College	1–0–0	
1890	Nebraska	2–0–0	
1890	Vanderbilt	1–0–0	
1891	Albion	4–0–0	
1891	Detroit College	1–0–0	
1891	Trinity (KY)	3–0–0	
1891	Purdue	4–0–0	
1891	Wake Forest	1–0–0	
1891	Yale	13–0–0	
1892	Case	3–0–0	
1892	Colgate	3–0–0	
1892	Minnesota	5–0–0	
1892	North Carolina A&M	1–0–0	
1892	Purdue	8–0–0	
1892	USC	1–0–0	
1892	Utah Agricultural	1–0–0	
1892	Wyoming	1–0–0	
1892	Yale	13–0–0	
1893	Case	4–0–0	
1893	Fordham	4–0–0	
1893	Maryland	6–0–0	
1893	Minnesota	6–0–0	
1893	North Carolina A&M	2–0–0	
1893	Princeton	11–0–0	
1893	Texas	4–0–0	
1894	North Dakota Agricultural	2–0–0	
1894	Columbia Physicians & Surgeons	3–0–0	
1894	New Mexico A&M	2–0–0	
1894	Penn	12–0–0	
1894	USC	1–0–0	
1894	Wyoming	3–0–0	
1894	Yale	16–0–0	
1894	Western Reserve	7–0–0	
1895	Arkansas Industrial	1–0–0	
1895	Bloomsburg	1–0–0	
1895	Miami (OH)	3–0–0	
1895	Hanover	2–0–0	
1895	LSU	3–0–0	
1895	Marquette	4–0–0	
1895	Oregon	4–0–0	
1895	Penn	14–0–0	
1895	St. Bonaventure	4–0–0	
1895	Texas	5–0–0	Texas was unscored upon
1895	Kendall	1–0–0	
1895	Washington Agricultural	2–0–0	
1895	Wyoming	1–0–0	
1896	Fordham	1–0–0	
1896	Georgia	4–0–0	
1896	LSU	6–0–0	
1896	North Carolina A&M	1–0–0	
1896	North Dakota	2–0–0	
1896	Oklahoma	2–0–0	
1896	Fordham	1–0–0	
1896	Tennessee	4–0–0	
1896	Wyoming	2–0–0	
1897	Alabama	1–0–0	
1897	Butler	1–0–0	
1897	Buffalo	8–0–0	
1897	Oklahoma	2–0–0	
1897	Oregon Agricultural	2–0–0	
1897	Penn	15–0–0	
1897	Washington Agricultural	2–0–0	
1897	Fairmount	1–0–0	
1897	Wyoming	2–0–0	
1898	Colorado Mines	9–0–0	
1898	Detroit College	5–0–0	
1898	Drexel	7–0–0	Drexel was unscored upon
1898	Harvard	11–0–0	
1898	Kalamazoo	7–0–0	MIAA champions
1898	Kentucky State College	7–0–0	Kentucky State College was unscored upon
1898	LSU	1–0–0	
1898	Michigan	10–0–0	
1898	North Carolina	9–0–0	
1898	Oklahoma	2–0–0	
1898	Kendall	1–0–0	
1899	Sewanee	12–0–0	
1899	New Mexico A&M	1–0–0	
1899	North Dakota	6–0–0	
1899	Utah Agricultural	1–0–0	

==== 1900 to present ====
Year	Team	Coach	Wins	Points for	Points against	Point differential	Average point differential
1900	Auburn	Watkins	4	148	5	143	35.8
1900	Baylor	Hamilton	3	44	6	38	12.7
1900	Central Michigan		1	20	5	15	15.0
1900	Clemson	Heisman	6	222	10	212	35.3
1900	Idaho	Herbold	1	12	6	6	6.0
1900	Texas	Thompson	6	113	13	100	16.7
1900	Tulane	Summersgill	5	105	0	105	21.0
1900	Yale	McBride	12	336	10	326	27.2
1901	Harvard	Reid	12	254	24	230	19.2
1901	Michigan	Yost	11	550	0	550	50.0
1901	North Dakota State	Harrison	7	261	17	244	34.9
1901	Saint Louis		10	233	14	219	21.9
1901	Wisconsin	King	9	316	5	311	34.6
1901	Wyoming	McMurray	1	38	0	38	38.0
1902	Arizona	Gillette	5	134	0	134	26.8
1902	California	Whipple	8	168	12	156	19.5
1902	Central Michigan	Tambling	4	82	0	82	20.5
1902	Michigan	Yost	11	644	12	632	57.5
1902	Nebraska	Booth	10	186	0	186	18.6
1902	North Dakota State	Cochems	4	168	0	168	42.0
1902	Oklahoma A&M		1	40	0	40	40.0
1902	South Dakota	Whittemore	10	239	0	239	23.9
1902	Wyoming	McMurray	1	18	0	18	18.0
1903	Arizona State	Irish	2	33	0	33	16.5
1903	Central Michigan	Tambling	6	69	11	58	9.7
1903	Nebraska	Booth	11	291	17	274	24.9
1903	North Dakota	Kennedy	8	298	11	287	35.9
1903	Princeton	Hillebrand	11	259	6	253	23.0
1903	Utah State	Campbell	3	78	0	78	26.0
1904	Arizona State	Irish	4	116	0	116	29.0
1904	Auburn	Donahue	6	170	11	159	26.5
1904	Charleston (WV)	Ropp	3	90	0	90	30.0
1904	Michigan	Yost	10	567	22	545	54.5
1904	Minnesota	Williams	13	725	12	713	54.8
1904	New Mexico	McEwan	1	11	0	11	11.0
1904	Northern Illinois	Fleager	5	90	17	73	14.6
1904	Penn	Williams	12	222	4	218	18.2
1904	Pittsburgh	Mosse	10	406	5	401	40.1
1904	Saint Louis		11	349	0	349	31.7
1904	Vanderbilt	McGugin	9	474	4	470	52.2
1905	Chicago	Stagg	11	271	5	266	24.2
1905	Colorado School of Mines	Ellsworth	6	125	16	109	18.2
1905	Idaho	Griffith	5	113	2	111	22.2
1905	LSU	Killian	3	36	0	36	12.0
1905	New Mexico State	Miller	3	96	0	96	32.0
1905	Stanford	Lanagan	8	138	13	125	15.6
1905	Yale	Owsley	10	226	4	222	22.2
1906	Butler	Robinson	1	17	0	17	17.0
1906	New Mexico State	Miller	4	71	12	59	14.8
1906	North Dakota State	Dobie	4	236	4	232	58.0
1906	Saint Louis	Cochems	11	407	20	387	35.2
1906	Washington State	Bender	6	44	0	44	7.3
1906	Wisconsin	Hutchins	5	78	15	63	12.6
1907	New Mexico	Angell	1	44	0	44	44.0
1907	New Mexico State	Miller	3	88	6	82	27.3
1907	North Dakota State	Dobie	3	163	10	153	51.0
1907	Oregon State	Norcross	6	137	0	137	22.8
1907	South Carolina	McKay	3	30	4	26	8.7
1908	Arizona	Galbraith	5	136	6	130	26.0
1908	Charleston (WV)		3	49	10	39	13.0
1908	Kansas	Kennedy	9	131	20	111	12.3
1908	Louisiana	McNaspy	6	93	16	77	12.8
1908	LSU	Wingard	10	442	11	431	43.1
1908	Miami (OH)	Foster	7	113	10	103	14.7
1909	Arkansas	Bezdek	7	186	18	168	24.0
1909	Colorado	Folsom	6	141	0	141	23.5
1909	Washington	Dobie	7	214	6	208	29.7
1909	Western Michigan	Spaulding	7	194	9	185	26.4
1909	Yale	Jones	10	209	0	209	20.9
1910	Arizona	Shipp	5	87	8	79	15.8
1910	Colorado	Folsom	6	121	3	118	19.7
1910	Colorado College		7	120	30	90	12.9
1910	Illinois	Hall	9	89	0	89	9.9
1910	Louisiana Industrial	Prince	7	265	6	259	37.0
1910	Pittsburgh	Thompson	9	282	0	282	31.3
1910	Washington	Dobie	6	150	8	142	23.7
1911	Colorado	Folsom	6	88	5	83	13.8
1911	New Mexico State	Badenoch	7	192	6	186	26.6
1911	Oklahoma	Owen	8	282	15	267	33.4
1911	Utah State	Teetzel	5	164	0	164	32.8
1911	Washington	Dobie	7	277	9	268	38.3
1912	Harvard	Haughton	9	176	22	154	17.1
1912	Middle Tennessee	Weber	1	29	7	22	22.0
1912	Notre Dame	Marks	7	389	27	362	51.7
1912	Penn State	Hollenback	8	285	6	279	34.9
1912	Troy	Penton	3	61	10	51	17.0
1912	Washington	Dobie	6	190	17	173	28.8
1912	Wisconsin	Juneau	7	246	29	217	31.0
1913	Auburn	Donahue	8	224	13	211	26.4
1913	Chicago	Stagg	7	124	27	97	13.9
1913	Harvard	Haughton	9	225	21	204	22.7
1913	Michigan State	Macklin	7	180	28	152	21.7
1913	Nebraska	Stiehm	8	138	28	110	13.8
1913	Notre Dame	Harper	7	268	41	227	32.4
1913	Rice	Arbuckle	4	81	14	67	16.8
1913	Washington	Dobie	7	266	20	246	35.1
1913	Western Michigan	Spaulding	4	59	15	44	11.0
1914	Army	Daly	9	219	20	199	22.1
1914	Connecticut	Warner	3	48	9	39	13.0
1914	Illinois	Zuppke	7	224	22	202	28.9
1914	Tennessee	Clevenger	9	374	37	337	37.4
1914	Texas	Allerdice	8	358	21	337	42.1
1914	Washington & Lee		9	324	12	312	34.7
1914	Western Michigan	Spaulding	6	180	7	173	28.8
1915	Colorado State	Hughes	7	243	31	212	30.3
1915	Cornell	Sharpe	9	287	50	237	26.3
1915	Nebraska	Stiehm	8	282	39	243	30.4
1915	Oklahoma	Owen	10	370	54	316	31.6
1915	Pittsburgh	Warner	8	247	19	228	28.5
1915	Washington	Dobie	7	274	14	260	37.1
1915	Washington State	Dietz	7	204	10	194	27.7
1916	Army	Daly	9	235	36	199	22.1
1916	Ohio State	Wilce	7	258	29	229	32.7
1916	Pittsburgh	Warner	8	255	25	230	28.8
1916	Tulsa	McBirney	10	566	40	526	52.6
1917	Denver	Fike	8	226	45	181	22.6
1917	Georgia Tech	Heisman	9	491	17	474	52.7
1917	Mare Island Marines		8	200	10	190	23.8
1917	Middle Tennessee	Floyd	7	201	0	201	28.7
1917	Pittsburgh	Warner	10	260	21	239	23.9
1917	Texas A&M	Bible	8	270	0	270	33.8
1917	Tuskegee	Gayle	7	279	14	265	37.9
1918	Army	Mitchell	1	20	0	20	20.0
1918	Bucknell	Wingard	6	236	7	229	31.2
1918	Central Michigan	Tambling	1	41	6	35	35.0
1918	Colorado School of Mines	Barron	4	184	21	163	40.8
1918	Michigan	Yost	5	96	6	90	18.0
1918	Middle Tennessee		1	12	7	5	5.0
1918	Oklahoma	Owen	6	278	7	271	45.2
1918	Presbyterian	Shaw	2	33	7	26	13.0
1918	Texas	Juneau	9	194	14	180	20.0
1918	Virginia Tech	Bernier	7	152	13	139	19.9
1918	Washington (MO)		6	163	27	136	22.7
1919	Centre	Moran	9	485	23	462	51.3
1919	Marshall	Reilly	8	302	13	289	36.1
1919	Middle Tennessee	Miles	4	148	6	142	35.5
1919	Notre Dame	Rockne	9	229	47	182	20.2
1919	Texas A&M	Bible	10	275	0	275	27.5
1920	Boston College	Cavanaugh	8	181	16	165	20.6
1920	California	Smith	9	510	14	496	55.1
1920	Notre Dame	Rockne	9	251	44	207	23.0
1920	Texas	Whitaker	9	282	13	269	29.9
1920	USC	Henderson	6	170	21	149	24.8
1920	VMI	Clarkson	9	431	20	411	45.7
1921	Cornell	Dobie	8	392	21	371	46.4
1921	Iowa	Jones	7	185	36	149	21.3
1921	Lafayette	Sutherland	9	274	26	248	27.6
1921	Louisiana Tech	Clark	6	106	20	86	14.3
1921	Miami (OH)	Little	8	238	13	225	28.1
1921	Texas State	Strahan	7	185	26	159	22.7
1922	Western Michigan	Olander	6	160	0	160	26.7
1922	Cornell	Dobie	8	339	27	312	39.0
1922	Princeton	Roper	8	127	34	93	11.6
1922	Iowa	Jones	7	208	33	175	25.0
1922	California	Smith	9	398	34	364	40.4
1922	Drake	Solem	7	155	26	129	18.4
1923	Illinois	Zuppke	8	136	20	116	14.5
1923	Michigan	Yost	8	150	12	138	17.3
1923	New Mexico State	Brown	9	218	17	201	22.3
1923	Yale	Jones	8	230	38	192	24.0
1923	Colorado	Witham	9	280	27	253	28.1
1923	Cornell	Dobie	8	320	33	287	35.9
1923	SMU	Freeland; Morrison	9	207	9	198	22.0
1924	Hawaii	Klum	8	185	12	173	21.6
1924	Notre Dame	Rockne	10	285	54	231	23.1
1925	Alabama	Wade	10	297	26	271	27.1
1925	Dartmouth	Hawley	8	340	29	311	38.9
1925	Eastern Michigan	Rynearson	8	106	6	100	12.5
1925	Hawaii	Klum	10	421	17	404	40.4
1925	Louisville	King	8	133	2	131	16.4
1926	Tuskegee	Abbott	10	288	84	204	20.4
1926	Utah	Armstrong	7	164	23	141	20.1
1927	Eastern Michigan	Rynearson	8	186	13	173	21.6
1928	Boston College	McKenney	9	263	39	224	24.9
1928	Georgia Tech	Alexander	10	221	47	174	17.4
1928	Detroit	Dorais	9	267	27	240	26.7
1929	Notre Dame	Rockne	9	145	38	107	11.9
1929	Purdue	Phelan	8	187	44	143	17.9
1929	Tulane	Bierman	9	279	45	234	26.0
1929	Tuskegee	Abbott	9	249	26	223	24.8
1929	Utah	Armstrong	7	219	23	196	28.0
1930	Notre Dame	Rockne	10	265	74	191	19.1
1930	Fresno State	Borleske	8	154	66	88	11.0
1930	Alabama	Wade	10	271	13	258	25.8
1930	Utah	Armstrong	8	340	20	320	40.0
1931	Louisiana Tech	Bohler	7	167	36	131	18.7
1932	USC	Jones	10	201	13	188	18.8
1932	Colgate	Kerr	9	264	0	264	29.3
1932	Michigan	Kipke	8	123	13	110	13.8
1933	DePauw	Neal	7	136	0	136	19.4
1933	Princeton	Crisler	9	217	8	209	23.2
1934	Minnesota	Bierman	8	270	38	232	29.0
1934	Alabama	Thomas	10	316	45	271	27.1
1934	Hawaii	Klum	6	142	21	121	20.1
1935	Alma	Campbell	8	180	13	167	20.9
1935	Middle Tennessee	Floyd	8	128	25	103	12.9
1935	Princeton	Crisler	9	256	32	224	24.9
1935	Minnesota	Bierman	8	194	46	148	18.5
1936	Case Western Reserve	Edwards	10	244	28	216	21.6
1938	Case Western Reserve	Edwards	9	259	31	228	25.3
1938	Georgetown	Hagerty	8	185	26	159	19.9
1938	TCU	Meyer	11	269	60	209	19.0
1938	Memphis	McKeen	10	281	41	240	24.0
1938	Tennessee	Neyland	11	293	16	277	25.2
1939	San Jose State	DeGroot	13	324	29	295	22.7
1939	Texas A&M	Norton	11	212	31	181	16.5
1939	Cornell	Snavely	8	197	52	145	18.1
1940	Minnesota	Bierman	8	154	71	83	10.4
1940	Stanford	Shaughnessy	10	196	85	111	11.1
1940	Boston College	Leahy	11	339	65	274	24.9
1940	Hardin–Simmons	Kimbrough	9	229	76	153	17.0
1940	Lafayette	Mylin	9	238	33	205	22.8
1941	East Carolina	Christenbury	7	159	20	139	19.9
1941	Western Michigan	Gary	8	183	27	156	19.5
1941	Minnesota	Bierman	8	186	38	148	18.5
1941	Duquesne	Donelli	8	143	23	120	15.0
1942	Alma	MacDonald	7	163	26	137	19.6
1942	Central Michigan	Finch	6	93	21	72	12.0
1942	Grambling State	Robinson	9	164	0	164	18.2
1942	Southern Miss	Green	4	142	7	135	33.8
1943	Eastern Michigan	Rynearson	2	28	0	28	14.0
1943	New Mexico State	Moulder	4	107	20	87	21.8
1943	Purdue	Burnham	9	214	55	159	17.7
1943	USNTC Bainbridge		7				
1943	Colorado College		7	199	27	172	24.6
1943	Vanderbilt	Alley	5	143	33	110	22.0
1944	Army	Blaik	9	504	35	469	52.1
1944	Northern Illinois	Evans	7	113	48	65	9.3
1944	Ohio State	Widdoes	9	287	79	208	23.1
1944	Randolph Field		12				
1944	USNTC Bainbridge		9				
1944	NAS Norman		9				
1944	Fort Pierce		9				
1945	Arizona	Casteel	5	193	12	181	36.2
1945	Army	Blaik	9	412	46	366	40.7
1945	Alabama	Thomas	9	430	80	350	38.9
1945	Oklahoma A&M	Lookabaugh	9	285	76	209	23.2
1946	Georgia	Butts	11	392	110	282	25.6
1946	Delaware	Murray	10	358	45	313	31.3
1947	Notre Dame	Leahy	9	291	52	239	26.6
1947	Michigan	Crisler	10	394	53	341	34.1
1948	Alma	Sebo	8	170	57	113	14.1
1948	Clemson	Howard	11	274	76	198	18.0
1948	Michigan	Oosterbaan	9	252	44	208	23.1
1948	Michigan Tech	Bovard	7	209	58	151	21.6
1949	Army	Blaik	9	354	68	286	31.8
1949	Ball State	Magnabosco	8	276	61	215	26.9
1949	Notre Dame	Leahy	10	360	86	274	27.4
1949	Oklahoma	Wilkinson	11	399	88	311	28.3
1949	Pacific	Siemering	11	575	66	509	46.3
1950	Florida State	Veller	8	219	54	165	20.6
1950	Lehigh	Leckonby	9	301	77	224	24.9
1950	Wyoming	Wyatt	10	363	59	304	30.4
1951	Michigan State	Munn	9	270	114	156	17.3
1951	Maryland	Tatum	10	381	75	306	30.6
1951	Northern Illinois	Evans	9	223	101	122	13.6
1951	Princeton	Caldwell	9	310	82	228	25.3
1951	San Francisco	Kuharich	9	286	72	214	23.8
1952	Georgia Tech	Dodd	12	325	59	266	22.2
1952	Michigan State	Munn	9	312	84	228	25.3
1954	Ohio State	Hayes	10	249	75	174	17.4
1954	UCLA	Sanders	9	367	40	327	36.3
1954	Oklahoma	Wilkinson	10	304	62	242	24.2
1955	Oklahoma	Wilkinson	11	385	60	325	29.5
1955	Miami (OH)	Parseghian	9	226	47	179	19.9
1955	Drexel	Eddie Allen	8	198	72	126	15.8
1956	Oklahoma	Wilkinson	10	466	51	415	41.5
1956	Wyoming	Dickens	10	252	112	140	14.0
1957	Auburn	Jordan	10	207	28	179	17.9
1957	Arizona State	Devine	10	397	66	331	33.1
1958	LSU	Dietzel	11	282	53	229	20.8
1959	Syracuse	Schwartzwalder	11	413	73	340	30.9
1960	Yale	Olivar	9	253	73	180	20.0
1960	Missouri	Devine	11	295	93	202	18.4
1960	New Mexico State	Woodson	11	394	113	281	25.5
1961	Alabama	Bryant	11	297	25	272	24.7
1961	Rutgers	Bateman	9	246	102	144	16.0
1962	USC	McKay	11	261	92	169	15.4
1962	Ole Miss	Vaught	10	247	53	194	19.4
1963	Texas	Royal	11	243	71	172	15.6
1964	Arkansas	Broyles	11	231	64	167	15.2
1964	Princeton	Colman	9	216	53	163	18.1
1966	Alabama	Bryant	11	301	44	257	23.4
1968	Ohio State	Hayes	10	323	150	173	17.3
1968	Penn State	Paterno	11	354	120	234	21.3
1969	Texas	Royal	11	435	119	316	28.7
1969	Penn State	Paterno	11	322	90	232	21.1
1969	San Diego State	Coryell	11	492	194	298	27.1
1969	Toledo	Lauterbur	11	385	160	225	20.5
1970	Arizona State	Kush	11	405	148	257	23.4
1970	Toledo	Lauterbur	12	384	88	296	24.7
1970	Dartmouth	Blackman	9	311	42	269	29.9
1971	Nebraska	Devaney	13	507	104	403	31.0
1971	Toledo	Murphy	12	383	96	287	23.9
1972	USC	McKay	12	467	134	333	27.8
1973	Notre Dame	Parseghian	11	382	89	293	26.6
1973	Penn State	Paterno	12	447	129	318	26.5
1973	Miami (OH)	Mallory	11	223	76	147	13.4
1974	Oklahoma	Switzer	11	473	92	381	34.6
1975	Arizona State	Kush	12	347	127	220	18.3
1975	Arkansas State	Davidson	11	355	81	274	24.9
1976	Pittsburgh	Majors	12	381	133	248	20.7
1976	Rutgers	Burns	12	287	81	206	17.2
1979	Alabama	Bryant	12	383	67	316	26.3
1980	Georgia	Dooley	12	333	137	196	16.3
1981	Clemson	Ford	12	338	105	233	19.4
1984	BYU	Edwards	13	456	183	273	21.0
1986	Penn State	Paterno	12	340	133	207	17.3
1987	Miami (FL)	Johnson	12	412	125	287	23.9
1988	Notre Dame	Holtz	12	393	156	237	19.8
1991	Miami (FL)	Erickson	12	386	100	286	23.8
1991	Washington	James	12	495	115	380	31.7
1992	Alabama	Stallings	13	366	122	244	18.8
1993	Auburn	Bowden, Terry	11	353	192	161	14.6
1994	Nebraska	Osborne	13	459	162	297	22.8
1994	Penn State	Paterno	12	564	252	312	26.0
1995	Nebraska	Osborne	12	638	174	464	38.7
1997	Michigan	Carr	12	322	114	208	17.3
1997	Nebraska	Osborne	13	607	214	393	30.2
1998	Tennessee	Fulmer	13	431	189	242	18.6
1998	Tulane	Bowden, Tommy; Scelfo	12	540	295	245	20.4
1999	Florida State	Bowden, Bobby	12	458	203	255	21.3
1999	Marshall	Pruett	13	463	137	326	25.1
2000	Oklahoma	Stoops	13	481	194	287	22.1
2001	Miami (FL)	Coker	12	512	117	395	32.9
2002	Ohio State	Tressel	14	410	183	227	16.2
2004	USC	Carroll	13	496	169	327	25.2
2004	Auburn	Tuberville	13	417	147	270	20.8
2004	Utah	Meyer	12	544	234	310	25.8
2005	Texas	Brown	13	652	213	439	33.8
2006	Boise State	Petersen	13	516	229	287	22.1
2008	Utah	Whittingham	13	480	224	256	19.7
2009	Alabama	Saban	14	449	164	285	20.4
2009	Boise State	Petersen	14	591	240	351	25.1
2010	Auburn	Chizik	14	577	337	240	17.1
2010	TCU	Patterson	13	520	137	383	29.5
2012	Ohio State	Meyer	12	458	276	182	15.2
2013	Florida State	Fisher	14	723	170	553	39.5
2017	UCF	Frost	13	627	329	298	22.9
2018	Clemson	Swinney	15	664	197	467	31.1
2019	LSU	Orgeron	15	726	328	398	26.5
2020	Alabama	Saban	13	630	252	378	29.3
2022	Georgia	Smart	15	551	166	385	25.7
2023	Michigan	Harbaugh	15	538	156	382	25.5
2025	Indiana	Cignetti	16	666	187	479	29.9

note: In 1917, 1918, 1943, and 1944, football teams from military training facilities competed alongside college programs

=== Undefeated with ties ===
These teams all finished the season with no losses, but with ties. This result has been impossible to achieve since the introduction of overtime to college football in 1996 which eliminated ties.

Year	Team	Record	Notes
1873	Harvard	1–0–1	
1877	Princeton	2–0–1	
1877	Yale	3–0–1	
1878	Columbia	0–0–2	
1879	Princeton	4–0–1	
1879	Michigan	1–0–1	
1879	Yale	3–0–2	
1879	Navy	0–0–1	
1880	Princeton	4–0–1	
1880	Yale	4–0–1	
1881	Princeton	7–0–2	
1881	Yale	5–0–1	
1881	Dartmouth	1–0–1	
1883	Yale	3–0–1	
1884	Yale	3–0–1	
1884	Princeton	3–0–1	
1884	Penn	3–0–1	
1886	Wabash	2–0–1	
1886	Yale	9–0–1	
1886	Princeton	7–0–1	
1888	Depauw	0–0–1	
1889	South Dakota	1–0–1	
1890	Butler	3–0–1	
1890	Washington	0–0–1	
1892	Stanford	4–0–2	
1893	Auburn	3–0–2	
1892	Stanford	9–0–1	
1894	Penn State	6–0–1	
1895	Stanford	4–0–1	
1895	Washington	4–0–1	
1896	Princeton	10–0–1	
1896	Lafayette	11–0–1	
1896	Texas A&M	2–0–1	
1897	Auburn	2–0–1	
1897	Yale	9–0–2	
1897	Hanover	4–0–1	
1898	Princeton	11–0–1	
1899	Denver	0–0–1	
1899	Ohio State	9–0–1	Ohio State allowed only five points.
1899	Harvard	10–0–1	
1899	Chicago	16–0–2	
1899	Iowa	8–0–1	
1899	Wabash	1–0–1	
1900	Iowa	7–0–1	
1900	Minnesota	10–0–2	
1901	Georgia Tech	4–0–1	
1901	Marquette	4–0–1	
1902	Texas A&M	7–0–2	
1902	Yale	11–0–1	
1903	Michigan	11–0–1	
1903	Minnesota	14–0–1	
1903	Stanford	8–0–3	
1904	Colorado School of Mines	5–0–1	
1904	Dartmouth	7–0–1	
1904	Colorado School of Mines	4–0–1	
1904	Albion	7–0–1	
1905	Penn	12–0–1	
1905	Georgia Tech	6–0–1	
1905	Colorado School of Mines	5–0–1	
1906	Colorado School of Mines	3–0–2	
1906	Princeton	9–0–1	
1906	Yale	9–0–1	
1906	Clemson	4–0–3	
1906	Colorado School of Mines	3–0–2	
1906	Eastern Michigan	5–0–1	
1907	Yale	9–0–1	
1907	Notre Dame	6–0–1	
1908	Albion	5–0–2	
1908	Penn	11–0–1	
1908	Harvard	9–0–1	
1908	Chicago	5–0–1	
1908	Kansas	12–0–1	
1908	Virginia	7–0–1	
1908	Washington	6–0–1	Part of NCAA Division I FBS record 64-game unbeaten streak
1909	Texas A&M	7–0–1	
1909	Lafayette	7–0–1	
1909	Penn State	5–0–2	
1909	Missouri	7–0–1	
1910	Harvard	8–0–1	
1910	Michigan	3–0–3	
1910	Vanderbilt	12–0–1	
1910	Navy	8–0–1	
1910	Michigan	3–0–3	
1910	Baylor	6–0–2	
1910	NC State	4–0–2	
1911	Princeton	8–0–2	
1911	Minnesota	6–0–1	
1911	Penn State	8–0–1	
1911	Navy	6–0–3	
1911	Florida	5–0–1	
1913	Washington & Jefferson	10–0–1	
1914	Auburn	8–0–1	
1914	Harvard	7–0–2	
1914	Colorado School of Mines	5–0–1	
1914	Nebraska	7–0–1	
1914	Oregon State	7–0–2	
1914	Washington	6–0–1	Part of NCAA Division I FBS record 64-game unbeaten streak
1915	Minnesota	6–0–1	
1915	Georgia Tech	7–0–1	
1915	Illinois	5–0–2	
1916	Miami (OH)	7–0–1	
1916	Georgia Tech	8–0–1	
1916	Oregon	7–0–1	
1916	Tennessee	8–0–1	
1916	Colorado State	5–0–2	
1916	Washington	6–0–1	Part of NCAA Division I FBS record 64-game unbeaten streak
1917	Miami (OH)	6–0–2	
1917	Ohio State	8–0–1	
1917	Washington State	6–0–1	
1917	Utah State	7–0–1	
1918	Miami (OH)	5–0–1	
1918	Naval Station Great Lakes	6–0–2	
1919	Harvard	9–0–1	
1920	Oklahoma	6–0–1	
1920	Georgia	8–0–1	
1920	Harvard	8–0–1	
1920	Pittsburgh	6–0–2	
1920	Princeton	6–0–1	
1920	Penn State	7–0–2	
1921	Washington & Jefferson	10–0–1	
1921	Vanderbilt	7–0–1	
1921	Penn State	8–0–2	
1921	California	9–0–1	
1922	West Virginia	10–0–1	
1922	Michigan	6–0–1	
1922	Vanderbilt	8–0–1	
1922	Army	8–0–2	
1923	California	9–0–1	
1923	Kansas	5–0–3	
1923	King	8–0–1	
1923	Texas	8–0–1	
1924	California	8–0–2	
1924	Connecticut	6–0–2	
1924	Dartmouth	7–0–1	
1924	Gonzaga	5–0–2	
1924	Yale	6–0–2	
1925	Colgate	7–0–2	
1925	North Dakota State	5–0–2	
1925	Tulane	9–0–1	
1926	Alabama	9–0–1	
1926	Stanford	10–0–1	
1926	Navy	9–0–1	
1926	SMU	8–0–1	
1926	Brown	9–0–1	
1927	Illinois	10–0–1	
1927	Minnesota	6–0–2	
1927	Texas A&M	8–0–1	
1927	Washington & Jefferson	7–0–2	
1927	Tennessee	8–0–1	
1928	USC	9–0–1	
1928	Tennessee	9–0–1	
1928	Utah	5–0–2	
1929	Memphis	8–0–2	
1929	TCU	9–0–1	
1929	Tennessee	9–0–1	
1929	SMU	6–0–4	
1930	Michigan	8–0–1	
1930	Marquette	8–0–1	
1932	Auburn	9–0–1	
1932	Western Michigan	6–0–1	
1933	Michigan	7–0–1	
1933	LSU	7–0–3	
1935	Case Western Reserve	9–0–1	
1936	Alabama	8–0–1	
1937	Pittsburgh	9–0–1	
1937	California	10–0–1	
1937	Fordham	7–0–1	
1937	Villanova	8–0–1	
1937	Dartmouth	7–0–2	
1937	Holy Cross	8–0–2	
1937	Marshall	9–0–1	
1938	Villanova	8–0–1	
1939	USC	8–0–2	
1939	UCLA	6–0–4	
1939	Duquesne	8–0–1	
1940	Mississippi State	10–0–1	
1941	Notre Dame	8–0–1	
1941	Utah	6–0–2	
1944	USC	8–0–2	
1945	Eastern Michigan	5–0–1	
1945	Indiana	9–0–1	
1946	Notre Dame	8–0–1	
1946	Army	9–0–1	
1947	Miami (OH)	9–0–1	
1947	SMU	9–0–2	
1947	Penn State	9–0–1	
1947	Penn	7–0–1	
1948	Notre Dame	9–0–1	
1948	Army	8–0–1	
1950	Clemson	9–0–1	
1951	Illinois	9–0–1	
1951	Georgia Tech	11–0–1	
1953	Notre Dame	9–0–1	
1954	Virginia Polytechnic	8–0–1	
1956	Texas A&M	9–0–1	
1957	VMI	9–0–1	
1958	Army	8–0–1	
1958	Auburn	9–0–1	
1958	Air Force	9–0–2	
1960	Ole Miss	10–0–1	
1961	Ohio State	8–0–1	
1963	Memphis State	9–0–1	
1966	Notre Dame	9–0–1	
1966	Michigan State	9–0–1	
1969	USC	10–0–1	
1970	Nebraska	11–0–1	
1973	Michigan	10–0–1	
1973	Ohio State	10–0–1	
1973	Oklahoma	10–0–1	
1974	Miami (OH)	10–0–1	
1979	Central Michigan	10–0–1	
1979	USC	11–0–1	
1982	SMU	11–0–1	
1985	Fresno State	11–0–1	
1987	Syracuse	11–0–1	
1990	Georgia Tech	11–0–1	
1992	Michigan	9–0–3	
1994	Texas A&M	10–0–1	
1995	Toledo	11–0–1	

note: In 1917, 1918, 1943, and 1944, football teams from military training facilities competed alongside college programs
note: In 1996, the NCAA eliminated ties with a new overtime system

=== Teams with multiple undefeated seasons ===
Teams ordered by the number of undefeated seasons in the top division. Teams in italics no longer compete in Division I FBS.

Team	Undefeated	Perfect
Yale	30	16
Princeton	29	18
Michigan	23	15
Notre Dame	22	13
USC	16	9
Harvard	14	8
Penn State	14	8
Oklahoma	13	11
Alabama	13	11
North Dakota State	12	10
Auburn	12	7
Washington	12	7
Nebraska	11	9
Miami (OH)	11	6
Minnesota	11	6
Texas	10	9
Colorado School of Mines	10	6
Ohio State	9	6
Washington State	9	4
Georgia Tech	9	3
Texas A&M	9	3
LSU	8	7
Pittsburgh	8	6
Penn	8	4
Army	8	4
Central Michigan	8	6
Utah	7	5
Tennessee	11	4
Dartmouth	7	3
Case Western Reserve	6	5
Western Michigan	6	5
Clemson	6	4
Georgia	5	4
Illinois	6	3
California	6	2
Utah St.	6	4
Cornell	5	5
Eastern Michigan	5	3
SMU	5	1
Colorado	4	4
Toledo	4	3
Chicago	4	2
Iowa	4	2
Lafayette	4	2
Vanderbilt	4	1
Arizona State	3	3
Arkansas	3	3
Florida State	3	3
Miami (FL)	3	3
Purdue	3	3
Rutgers	3	3
Saint Louis	3	3
Wisconsin	3	3
Michigan State	3	2
Oregon State	3	2
TCU	3	2
Tulane	3	2
Navy	3	0
Washington & Jefferson	3	0
Arkansas St.	2	2
Boise State	2	2
Marshall	2	2
Maryland	2	2
Colorado College	2	2
Ole Miss	2	1
Connecticut	2	1
Colorado State	2	1
Drexel	2	2
Duquesne	2	1
Indiana	2	1
Kansas	2	1
Memphis	2	1
Stanford	2	1
Syracuse	2	1
UCLA	2	1
USNTC Bainbridge	2	2
Villanova	2	0

=== Coaches with multiple undefeated seasons ===
Coaches ordered by the number of undefeated seasons in the top division.

Team	Undefeated	Perfect
Gil Dobie	14	11
Fielding H. Yost	9	6
Earl Blaik	7	3
John Heisman	7	3
Frank Leahy	7	3
Bernie Bierman	6	5
Howard Jones	6	4
Glenn Scobey Warner	6	4
Cleve Abbott	6	2
Robert Neyland	6	1
Joe Paterno	5	5
Knute Rockne	5	5
Ike Armstrong	5	3
Percy Haughton	5	2
Hugo Bezdek	5	1
Bud Wilkinson	4	4
Bear Bryant	4	3
Bennie Owen	4	3
Elton Rynearson	4	3
Warren B. Woodson	4	3
Dana X. Bible	4	2
Walter Camp	4	2
Woody Hayes	4	2
Amos Alonzo Stagg	4	2
Robert Zuppke	4	2
Dan McGugin	4	1
Francis Schmidt	4	0
Tom Osborne	3	3
Nick Saban	2	2
Urban Meyer	2	2

== Division I Football Championship Subdivision ==
This section covers teams that competed in the second tier of Division I since it was split in 1978:

- Division I-AA from 1978 to 2005
- Football Championship Subdivision (FCS) from 2006

Note that Division I FCS features a single-elimination championship tournament, reducing the likelihood of multiple teams finishing the season with undefeated records. However, several conferences voluntarily do not compete in the tournament, thus there exists a chance to have multiple undefeated teams in the same year.

In both lists in this section, teams in bold competed in the I-AA or FCS playoffs, thereby winning the national title.

=== Undefeated and untied ===
These teams finished the season with no losses or ties in Division I-AA or FCS football since 1978.

Year	Team	Record	Coach
1982	**Eastern Kentucky**	**13–0–0**	Kidd
1984	Tennessee State	11–0	Thomas
1986	Penn	10–0–0	Zubrow
1987	Holy Cross	11–0–0	Duffner
1989	**Georgia Southern**	**15–0–0**	Russell
1991	Holy Cross	11–0–0	Duffner
1993	Penn	10–0–0	Bagnoli
1994	Penn	9–0–0	Bagnoli
1996	**Marshall**	**15–0**	Pruett
1996	Dayton	11–0	Kelly
1996	Dartmouth	11–0	Lyons
2000	Davidson	11–0	Susan
2000	Robert Morris	10–0	Walton
2001	Sacred Heart	10–0	Fleming
2001	Harvard	9–0	Murphy
2003	Penn	10–0	Bagnoli
2004	Harvard	10–0	Murphy
2009	South Alabama	7–0	Jones
2010	South Alabama	10–0	Jones
2013	**North Dakota State**	**15–0**	Bohl
2014	Harvard	10–0	Murphy
2017	North Carolina A&T	12–0	Broadway
2018	Princeton	10–0	Surace
2018	**North Dakota State**	**15–0**	Klieman
2019	**North Dakota State**	**16–0**	Entz
2020	Alabama A&M	5–0	Maynor
2020	**Sam Houston**	**10–0**	Keeler
2023	**South Dakota State**	**15–0**	Rogers

=== Undefeated with ties ===
These teams finished the season with no losses, but with ties, in Division I-AA or FCS football since 1978.

Year	Team	Record	Coach
1991	Alabama State	11–0–1	Markham
1994	**Youngstown State**	**14–0–1**	Tressel

== See also ==
- Perfect season
- List of major college football winless seasons
