= 1910 Arizona football team =

American college football season

1910 Arizona football
- Conference: Independent
- Record: 5–0
- Head coach: Frank Shipp (1st season)
- Captain: Charles John Roletti

1910 Western college football independents records
	Conf.			Overall
Team	W	L	T	W		L		T
USC		–		7	–	0	–	1
Utah Agricultural		–		5	–	2	–	0
Hawaii		–		4	–	2	–	0
Montana		–		3	–	2	–	1
New Mexico A&M		–		3	–	2	–	0
Wyoming		–		4	–	4	–	0
Montana Agricultural		–		2	–	3	–	2
New Mexico		–		0	–	3	–	0

The 1910 Arizona football team was an American football team that represented the University of Arizona as an independent during the 1910 college football season. In its first season under head coach Frank Shipp, the team compiled a 5–0 record, shut out three of five opponents, and outscored all opponents by a total of 87 to 12. The team captain was Charles John Roletti.

== Schedule ==
Date	Opponent	Site	Result	Attendance	Source
	Tucson High School	Tucson, Arizona Territory	W 21–0		
October 27	Tucson High School	Tucson, Arizona Territory	W 18–6		
November 5	El Paso Military	Tucson, Arizona Territory	W 29–0		
November 18	New Mexico A&M	Tucson, Arizona Territory	W 18–2		
November 24	New Mexico	(rivalry)	W 1–0 (forfeit)		
