= List of Hawaii Rainbow Warriors football seasons =

This is a list of seasons completed by the Hawaii Rainbow Warriors football program since the team's conception in 1909. The list documents season-by-season records.

== Seasons ==
| Conference champions * | Division champions † | Bowl game berth ^ |

| Season | Head coach | Conference | Season results | | | | | Bowl result | Final ranking | |
| Season | Head coach | Conference | Conference finish | Division finish | Wins | Losses | Ties | Bowl result | Associated Press Poll | Coaches' Poll |
|---|---|---|---|---|---|---|---|---|---|---|
Hawaii Rainbow Warriors
| 1909 | Austin Jones | Independent | N/A | N/A | 2 | 2 | 0 | — | N/A | N/A |
| 1910 | Austin Jones | Independent | N/A | N/A | 4 | 2 | 0 | — | N/A | N/A |
| 1911 | Austin Jones | Independent | N/A | N/A | 2 | 2 | 0 | — | N/A | N/A |
| 1912 | No team | | | | | | | | | |
| 1913 | No team | | | | | | | | | |
| 1914 | No team | | | | | | | | | |
| 1915 | John Peden | Independent | N/A | N/A | 5 | 1 | 1 | — | N/A | N/A |
| 1916 | William Britton | Independent | N/A | N/A | 3 | 2 | 1 | — | N/A | N/A |
| 1917 | David L. Crawford | Independent | N/A | N/A | 4 | 0 | 1 | — | N/A | N/A |
| 1918 | David L. Crawford | Independent | N/A | N/A | 3 | 1 | 0 | — | N/A | N/A |
| 1919 | David L. Crawford | Independent | N/A | N/A | 4 | 0 | 1 | — | N/A | N/A |
| 1920 | Raymond Elliot | Independent | N/A | N/A | 6 | 2 | 0 | — | N/A | N/A |
| 1921 | Otto "Proc" Klum | Independent | N/A | N/A | 3 | 3 | 2 | — | N/A | N/A |
| 1922 | Otto "Proc" Klum | Independent | N/A | N/A | 5 | 1 | 1 | — | N/A | N/A |
| 1923 | Otto "Proc" Klum | Independent | N/A | N/A | 5 | 1 | 2 | — | N/A | N/A |
| 1924 | Otto "Proc" Klum | Independent | N/A | N/A | 8 | 0 | 0 | — | N/A | N/A |
| 1925 | Otto "Proc" Klum | Independent | N/A | N/A | 10 | 0 | 0 | — | N/A | N/A |
| 1926 | Otto "Proc" Klum | Independent | N/A | N/A | 5 | 4 | 0 | — | N/A | N/A |
| 1927 | Otto "Proc" Klum | Independent | N/A | N/A | 5 | 2 | 0 | — | N/A | N/A |
| 1928 | Otto "Proc" Klum | Independent | N/A | N/A | 2 | 5 | 0 | — | N/A | N/A |
| 1929 | Otto "Proc" Klum | Independent | N/A | N/A | 4 | 3 | 0 | — | N/A | N/A |
| 1930 | Otto "Proc" Klum | Independent | N/A | N/A | 5 | 2 | 0 | — | N/A | N/A |
| 1931 | Otto "Proc" Klum | Independent | N/A | N/A | 3 | 2 | 1 | — | N/A | N/A |
| 1932 | Otto "Proc" Klum | Independent | N/A | N/A | 2 | 1 | 1 | — | N/A | N/A |
| 1933 | Otto "Proc" Klum | Independent | N/A | N/A | 4 | 3 | 0 | — | N/A | N/A |
| 1934 | Otto "Proc" Klum | Independent | N/A | N/A | 6 | 0 | 0 | — | N/A | N/A |
| 1935 | Otto "Proc" Klum | Independent | N/A | N/A | 5 | 3 | 0 | — | N/A | N/A |
| 1936 | Otto "Proc" Klum | Independent | N/A | N/A | 3 | 5 | 0 | — | N/A | N/A |
| 1937 | Otto "Proc" Klum | Independent | N/A | N/A | 2 | 6 | 0 | — | N/A | N/A |
| 1938 | Otto "Proc" Klum | Independent | N/A | N/A | 4 | 4 | 0 | — | N/A | N/A |
| 1939 | Otto "Proc" Klum | Independent | N/A | N/A | 3 | 6 | 0 | — | N/A | N/A |
| 1940 | Eugene "Luke" Gill | Independent | N/A | N/A | 2 | 5 | 0 | — | N/A | N/A |
| 1941 | Eugene "Luke" Gill Tom Kaulukukui | Independent | N/A | N/A | 8 | 1 | 0 | — | N/A | N/A |
| 1942 | No team | | | | | | | | | |
| 1943 | No team | | | | | | | | | |
| 1944 | No team | | | | | | | | | |
| 1945 | No team | | | | | | | | | |
| 1946 | Tom Kaulukukui | Independent | N/A | N/A | 8 | 2 | 0 | — | N/A | N/A |
| 1947 | Tom Kaulukukui | Independent | N/A | N/A | 8 | 5 | 0 | — | N/A | N/A |
| 1948 | Tom Kaulukukui | Independent | N/A | N/A | 7 | 4 | 1 | — | N/A | N/A |
| 1949 | Tom Kaulukukui | Independent | N/A | N/A | 6 | 3 | 0 | — | N/A | N/A |
| 1950 | Tom Kaulukukui | Independent | N/A | N/A | 5 | 4 | 2 | — | N/A | N/A |
| 1951 | Archie Kodros | Independent | N/A | N/A | 4 | 7 | 0 | — | N/A | N/A |
| 1952 | Hank Vasconcellos | Independent | N/A | N/A | 5 | 5 | 2 | — | N/A | N/A |
| 1953 | Hank Vasconcellos | Independent | N/A | N/A | 5 | 6 | 0 | — | N/A | N/A |
| 1954 | Hank Vasconcellos | Independent | N/A | N/A | 4 | 4 | 0 | — | N/A | N/A |
| 1955 | Hank Vasconcellos | Independent | N/A | N/A | 7 | 4 | 0 | — | N/A | N/A |
| 1956 | Hank Vasconcellos | Independent | N/A | N/A | 7 | 3 | 0 | — | N/A | N/A |
| 1957 | Hank Vasconcellos | Independent | N/A | N/A | 4 | 4 | 1 | — | N/A | N/A |
| 1958 | Hank Vasconcellos | Independent | N/A | N/A | 5 | 7 | 0 | — | N/A | — (Note: The UPI small college football ratings started in 1958.) |
| 1959 | Hank Vasconcellos | Independent | N/A | N/A | 3 | 6 | 0 | — | N/A | — |
| 1960 | Hank Vasconcellos | Independent | N/A | N/A | 3 | 7 | 0 | — | — (Note: The AP small college football ratings started in 1960.) | — |
| 1961 | No team | | | | | | | | | |
| 1962 | Jim Asato | Independent | N/A | N/A | 6 | 2 | 0 | — | — | — |
| 1963 | Jim Asato | Independent | N/A | N/A | 5 | 5 | 0 | — | — | — |
| 1964 | Jim Asato | Independent | N/A | N/A | 4 | 5 | 0 | — | — | — |
| 1965 | Clark Shaughnessy | Independent | N/A | N/A | 1 | 8 | 1 | — | — | — |
| 1966 | Phil Sarboe | Independent | N/A | N/A | 4 | 6 | 0 | — | — | — |
| 1967 | Don King | Independent | N/A | N/A | 6 | 4 | 0 | — | — | — |
| 1968 | Dave Holmes | Independent | N/A | N/A | 7 | 3 | 0 | — | — | — |
| 1969 | Dave Holmes | Independent | N/A | N/A | 6 | 3 | 1 | — | — | — |
| 1970 | Dave Holmes | Independent | N/A | N/A | 9 | 2 | 0 | — | — | — |
| 1971 | Dave Holmes | Independent | N/A | N/A | 7 | 4 | 0 | — | — | — |
| 1972 | Dave Holmes | Independent | N/A | N/A | 8 | 3 | 0 | — | — | — |
| 1973 | Dave Holmes | Independent | N/A | N/A | 9 | 2 | 0 | — | — | — |
| 1974 | Larry Price | Independent | N/A | N/A | 6 | 5 | 0 | — | — | — |
| 1975 | Larry Price | Independent | N/A | N/A | 6 | 5 | 0 | — | — | — |
| 1976 | Larry Price | Independent | N/A | N/A | 3 | 8 | 0 | — | — | — |
| 1977 | Dick Tomey | Independent | N/A | N/A | 5 | 6 | 0 | — | — | — |
| 1978 | Dick Tomey | Independent | N/A | N/A | 6 | 5 | 0 | — | — | — |
| 1979 | Dick Tomey | WAC | 4th | N/A | 6 | 5 | 0 | — | — | — |
| 1980 | Dick Tomey | WAC | 3rd | N/A | 8 | 3 | 0 | — | — | — |
| 1981 | Dick Tomey | WAC | 2nd | N/A | 9 | 2 | 0 | — | — | — |
| 1982 | Dick Tomey | WAC | 5th | N/A | 6 | 5 | 0 | — | — | — |
| 1983 | Dick Tomey | WAC | 5th | N/A | 5 | 5 | 1 | — | — | — |
| 1984 | Dick Tomey | WAC | 2nd | N/A | 7 | 4 | 0 | — | — | — |
| 1985 | Dick Tomey | WAC | 4th | N/A | 4 | 6 | 2 | — | — | — |
| 1986 | Dick Tomey | WAC | 4th | N/A | 7 | 5 | 0 | — | — | — |
| 1987 | Bob Wagner | WAC | 6th | N/A | 5 | 7 | 0 | — | — | — |
| 1988 | Bob Wagner | WAC | 3rd | N/A | 9 | 3 | 0 | — | — | — |
| 1989 | Bob Wagner | WAC | 3rd | N/A | 9 | 3 | 1 | Lost Aloha Bowl against Michigan State Spartans 13–33 ^ | — | — |
| 1990 | Bob Wagner | WAC | 4th | N/A | 7 | 5 | 0 | — | — | — |
| 1991 | Bob Wagner | WAC | 5th | N/A | 4 | 7 | 1 | — | — | — |
| 1992 * | Bob Wagner | WAC | T-1st | N/A | 11 | 2 | 0 | Won Holiday Bowl against Illinois Fighting Illini 27–17 ^ | 20 | 19 |
| 1993 | Bob Wagner | WAC | 8th | N/A | 6 | 6 | 0 | — | — | — |
| 1994 | Bob Wagner | WAC | 10th | N/A | 3 | 8 | 1 | — | — | — |
| 1995 | Bob Wagner | WAC | 9th | N/A | 4 | 8 | 0 | — | — | — |
| 1996 | Fred von Appen | WAC | — | 7th | 2 | 10 | — (Note: Overtime rules in college football were introduced in 1996, making ties impossible in the years since.) | — | — | — |
| 1997 | Fred von Appen | WAC | — | 8th | 3 | 9 | — | — | — | — |
| 1998 | Fred von Appen | WAC | — | 8th | 0 | 12 | — | — | — | — |
| 1999 * | June Jones | WAC | T-1st | N/A | 9 | 4 | — | Won Oahu Bowl against Oregon State Beavers 23–17 ^ | — | — |
| 2000 | June Jones | WAC | 7th | N/A | 3 | 9 | — | — | — | — |
| 2001 | June Jones | WAC | 4th | N/A | 9 | 3 | — | — | — | — |
| 2002 | June Jones | WAC | 2nd | N/A | 10 | 4 | — | Lost Hawaii Bowl against Tulane Green Wave 28–36 ^ | — | — |
| 2003 | June Jones | WAC | 4th | N/A | 9 | 5 | — | Won Hawaii Bowl against Houston Cougars 54–48 ^ | — | — |
| 2004 | June Jones | WAC | 5th | N/A | 8 | 5 | — | Won Hawaii Bowl against UAB Blazers 59–40 ^ | — | — |
| 2005 | June Jones | WAC | 5th | N/A | 5 | 7 | — | — | — | — |
| 2006 | June Jones | WAC | 2nd | N/A | 11 | 3 | — | Won Hawaii Bowl against Arizona State Sun Devils 41–24 ^ | — | — |
| 2007 * | June Jones | WAC | 1st | N/A | 12 | 1 | — | Lost Sugar Bowl against Georgia Bulldogs 10–41 ^ | 19 | 17 |
| 2008 | Greg McMackin | WAC | 4th | N/A | 7 | 7 | — | Lost Hawaii Bowl against Notre Dame Fighting Irish 21–49 ^ | — | — |
| 2009 | Greg McMackin | WAC | 5th | N/A | 6 | 7 | — | — | — | — |
| 2010 * | Greg McMackin | WAC | T-1st | N/A | 10 | 4 | — | Lost Hawaii Bowl against Tulsa Golden Hurricane 35–62 ^ | — | — |
| 2011 | Greg McMackin | WAC | 4th | N/A | 6 | 7 | — | — | — | — |
| 2012 | Norm Chow | MWC | 10th | N/A | 3 | 9 | — | — | — | — |
| 2013 | Norm Chow | MWC | — | 6th | 1 | 11 | — | — | — | — |
| 2014 | Norm Chow | MWC | — | 4th | 4 | 9 | — | — | — | — |
| 2015 | Norm Chow Chris Naeole | MWC | — | 6th | 3 | 10 | — | — | — | — |
| 2016 | Nick Rolovich | MWC | — | 2nd | 7 | 7 | — | Won Hawaii Bowl against Middle Tennessee Blue Raiders 52–35 ^ | — | — |
| 2017 | Nick Rolovich | MWC | — | 5th | 3 | 9 | — | — | — | — |
| 2018 | Nick Rolovich | MWC | — | 3rd | 8 | 6 | — | Lost Hawaii Bowl against Louisiana Tech Bulldogs 14–31 ^ | — | — |
| 2019 † | Nick Rolovich | MWC | 2nd | 1st | 10 | 5 | — | Won Hawaii Bowl against BYU Cougars 38–34 ^ | — | — |
| 2020 | Todd Graham | MWC | 5th | N/A | 5 | 4 | — | Won New Mexico Bowl against Houston Cougars 28–14 ^ | — | — |
| 2021 | Todd Graham | MWC | — | 5th | 6 | 7 | — | — | — | — |
| 2022 | Timmy Chang | MWC | — | 5th | 3 | 10 | — | — | — | — |
| 2023 | Timmy Chang | MWC | T–8th | — | 5 | 8 | — | — | — | — |
| 2024 | Timmy Chang | MWC | T–5th | — | 5 | 7 | — | — | — | — |
| 2025 | Timmy Chang | MWC | T-5th | — | 9 | 4 | — | Won Hawaii Bowl against California Golden Bears 35–31 ^ | — | — |
| Total | | | | | 589 | 497 | 25 | (only includes regular season games) | | |
| Total | | | | | 9 | 6 | 0 | (only includes bowl games) | | |
| Total | | | | | 598 | 503 | 25 | (all games) | | |
