= Harold Dean =

Harold Dean may refer to:

- Harold Dean (footballer) (1910–?), English footballer
- Harold Dean (politician) (1913–1997), Queensland politician
- Harold I. Dean (1884–1949), American football and college basketball coach
