= 1911 Wyoming Cowboys football team =

American college football season

1911 Wyoming Cowboys football
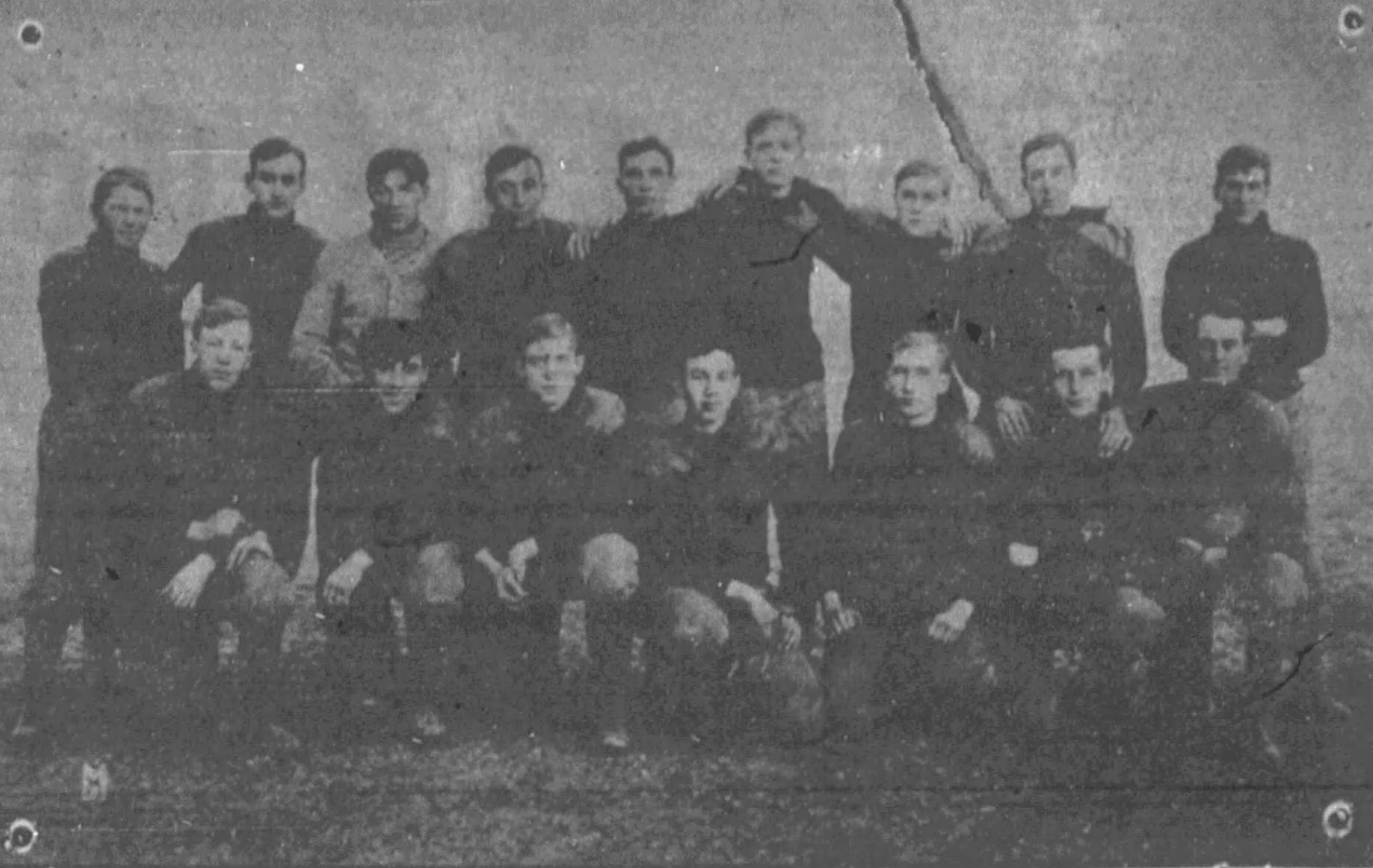
- Conference: Rocky Mountain Conference
- Record: 4–3–1 (2–3 RMC)
- Head coach: Harold I. Dean (3rd season)
- Captain: S. M. Fuller

1911 Rocky Mountain Conference football standings
| | Conf. | | | | | Overall |
| Team | W | | L | | T | W | | L | | T |
|---|---|---|---|---|---|---|---|---|---|---|
| Colorado $ | 5 | – | 0 | – | 0 | 6 | – | 0 | – | 0 |
| Utah | 3 | – | 1 | – | 1 | 5 | – | 1 | – | 1 |
| Denver | 3 | – | 1 | – | 1 | 5 | – | 2 | – | 1 |
| Colorado College | 3 | – | 2 | – | 0 | 4 | – | 3 | – | 0 |
| Wyoming | 2 | – | 3 | – | 0 | 4 | – | 3 | – | 1 |
| Colorado Mines | 1 | – | 5 | – | 0 | 2 | – | 5 | – | 0 |
| Colorado Agricultural | 0 | – | 5 | – | 0 | 0 | – | 6 | – | 0 |
$ – Conference champion

The 1911 Wyoming Cowboys football team was an American football team that represented the University of Wyoming as a member of the Rocky Mountain Conference (RMC) during the 1911 college football season. In their third season under head coach Harold I. Dean, the Cowboys compiled a 4–3–1 overall record (2–3 against conference opponents) and finished fifth in the RMC in their first year in the conference. They outscored opponents by a total of 139 to 53. S. M. Fuller was the team captain

== Schedule ==
| Date | Opponent | Site | Result | Source |
|---|---|---|---|---|
| September 30 | Laramie High School* | Laramie, WY | W 74–0 | |
| October 7 | at Colorado College | Washburn Field; Colorado Springs, CO | L 9–29 | |
| October 14 | at South Dakota Mines* | The ball park; Rapid City, SD | T 0–0 | |
| October 21 | Colorado Mines | Laramie, WY | W 5–0 | |
| October 28 | at Colorado | Boulder, CO | L 3–18 | |
| November 13 | Grand Island Baptist* | Laramie, WY | W 21–0 | |
| November 18 | Denver | Laramie, WY | L 0–6 | |
| November 30 | at Colorado Agricultural | Fort Collins, CO (rivalry) | W 27–0 | |
*Non-conference game
