= List of Colorado State Rams men's basketball head coaches =

The following is a list of Colorado State Rams men's basketball head coaches. There have been 21 head coaches of the Rams in their 123-season history.

Colorado State's current head coach is Ali Farokhmanesh. He was hired as the Rams' head coach in March 2025, replacing Niko Medved who had accepted a Head Coaching position for the University of Minnesota.

No.	Tenure	Coach	Years	Record	Pct.
–	1901–1905	No coach	4	5–3	.625
1	1905–1908 (Note: Colorado State did not field a basketball team for the 1908–09 season.); 1909–1910	Claude Rothgeb	4	10–10	.500
2	1910–1911	George Cassidy	1	5–4	.556
3	1911–1925	Harry W. Hughes	14	60–79	.432
4	1925–1928	Rudy Lavik	3	11–26	.297
5	1928–1934	Joe Ryan	6	30–44	.405
6	1934–1935	Saaly Salwachter	1	6–6	.500
7	1935–1937	Sam Campbell	2	10–15	.400
8	1937–1943 (Note: Colorado State did not field a basketball team for the 1943–44 season.); 1944–1945	John S. Davis	7	42–80	.344
9	1945–1949	E. D. Taylor	4	38–63	.376
10	1949–1950	Bebe Lee	1	7–23	.233
11	1950–1954	Bill Strannigan	4	60–56	.517
12	1954–1980	Jim Williams	26	352–293	.546
13	1980–1987	Tony McAndrews	7	80–120	.400
14	1987–1991	Boyd Grant	4	81–46	.638
15	1991–1998	Stew Morrill	7	121–86	.585
16	1998–2000	Ritchie McKay	2	37–23	.617
17	2000–2007	Dale Layer	7	103–106	.493
18	2007–2012	Tim Miles	5	71–88	.447
19	2012–2018 (Note: Eustachy was suspended pending an investigation into his conduct as head coach. Barnes was named interim coach for the remainder of the season. Eustachy later resigned.)	Larry Eustachy	6	121–74	.621
–	2018* (Note: Barnes was suspended as part of the investigation into the behavior of Colorado State's coaching staff. Herl was named interim coach for the remainder of the season.)	Steve Barnes	1	0–2	.000
–	2018*	Jase Herl	1	1–5	.167
20	2018–2025	Niko Medved	7	143–85	.627
21	2025–Present	Ali Farokhmanesh	2	21–13	.618
Totals		21 coaches	123 seasons	1,415–1,348	.512
Records updated through end of 2024–25 season * - Denotes interim head coach. Source
