= 1911 University of Utah football team =

American college football season

1911 University of Utah football
- Conference: Rocky Mountain Conference
- Record: 5–1–1 (3–1–1 RMC)
- Head coach: Fred Bennion (2nd season)
- Captain: Lon Romney
- Home stadium: Cummings Field

1911 Rocky Mountain Conference football standings
	Conf.					Overall
Team	W		L		T	W		L		T
Colorado $	5	–	0	–	0	6	–	0	–	0
Utah	3	–	1	–	1	5	–	1	–	1
Denver	3	–	1	–	1	5	–	2	–	1
Colorado College	3	–	2	–	0	4	–	3	–	0
Wyoming	2	–	3	–	0	4	–	3	–	1
Colorado Mines	1	–	5	–	0	2	–	5	–	0
Colorado Agricultural	0	–	5	–	0	0	–	6	–	0
$ – Conference champion

The 1911 University of Utah football team was an American football team that represented the University of Utah as a member of the Rocky Mountain Conference (RMC) during the 1911 college football season. In its second season under head coach Fred Bennion, the team compiled an overall record of 5–1–1 record with a mark of 3–1–1 against conference opponents, finished second in RMC, shut out five of seven opponents, and outscored all opponents by a total of 200 to 15. The team played its home games at Cummings Field in Salt Lake City. Lon Romney was the team captain.

== Schedule ==
Date	Opponent	Site	Result	Attendance	Source
October 7	Colorado Agricultural	Cummings Field; Salt Lake City, UT	W 51–0		
October 14	at Denver	Denver, CO	T 0–0	3,000	
October 28	Montana Agricultural*	Cummings Field; Salt Lake City, UT	W 97–0		
November 4	Colorado Mines	Cummings Field; Salt Lake City, UT	W 15–0		
November 11	at Colorado College	Washburn Field; Colorado Springs, CO	W 18–6		
November 18	Colorado	Cummings Field; Salt Lake City, UT (rivalry)	L 0–9		
November 30	Idaho*	Cummings Field; Salt Lake City, UT	W 19–0		
*Non-conference game
