= 1911 Colorado Agricultural Aggies football team =

American college football season

1911 Colorado Agricultural Aggies football
- Conference: Rocky Mountain Conference
- Record: 0–6 (0–5 RMC)
- Head coach: Harry W. Hughes (1st season)
- Home stadium: Durkee Field

1911 Rocky Mountain Conference football standings
	Conf.					Overall
Team	W		L		T	W		L		T
Colorado $	5	–	0	–	0	6	–	0	–	0
Utah	3	–	1	–	1	5	–	1	–	1
Denver	3	–	1	–	1	5	–	2	–	1
Colorado College	3	–	2	–	0	4	–	3	–	0
Wyoming	2	–	3	–	0	4	–	3	–	1
Colorado Mines	1	–	5	–	0	2	–	5	–	0
Colorado Agricultural	0	–	5	–	0	0	–	6	–	0
$ – Conference champion

The 1911 Colorado Agricultural Aggies football team represented Colorado Agricultural College (now known as Colorado State University) in the Rocky Mountain Conference (RMC) during the 1911 college football season. In their first season under head coach Harry W. Hughes, the Aggies compiled a 0–6 record, failed to score a point during the season, and were outscored by a total of 216 to 0.

== Schedule ==
Date	Opponent	Site	Result	Source
October 7	at Utah	Cummings Field; Salt Lake City, UT	L 0–51	
October 14	at Utah Agricultural*	U.A.C. gridiron; Logan, UT	L 0–29	
October 28	Colorado Mines	Durkee Field; Fort Collins, CO	L 0–29	
November 4	at Denver	Denver, CO	L 0–49	
November 11	at Colorado	Gamble Field; Boulder, CO (rivalry)	L 0–31	
November 30	Wyoming	Durkee Field; Fort Collins, CO (rivalry)	L 0–27	
*Non-conference game
