= James Gayle =

James Gayle may refer to:

- James Gayle (American football coach) (fl. 1917–1921)
- James Gayle (linebacker) (born 1991), American football linebacker
