= 1911 University of New Mexico football team =

American college football season

1911 University of New Mexico football
- Conference: Independent
- Record: 1–3–1
- Head coach: Ralph Hutchinson (1st season)
- Home stadium: Traction Park

1911 Western college football independents records
	Conf.			Overall
Team	W	L	T	W		L		T
New Mexico A&M		–		7	–	0	–	0
Utah Agricultural		–		4	–	0	–	1
Arizona		–		3	–	1	–	1
Montana		–		2	–	1	–	0
Hawaii		–		2	–	2	–	0
New Mexico		–		1	–	3	–	1
Montana Agricultural		–		0	–	2	–	1

The 1911 University of New Mexico football team was an American football team that represented the University of New Mexico as an independent during the 1911 college football season. In its first season under head coach Ralph Hutchinson (who was also the university's first athletic director), the team compiled a 1–3–1 record but outscored opponents by a total of 62 to 22. James Guy Hamilton was the team captain.

During the final game of the season against Arizona, the bleachers with 400 persons collapsed, causing several minor injuries.

== Schedule ==
Date	Opponent	Site	Result	Attendance	Source
October 21	at El Paso Military Institute	El Paso, TX	L 0–6		
November 4	New Mexico Military	Traction Park; Albuquerque, New Mexico Territory	T 0–0		
November 12	at New Mexico A&M	Las Cruces, New Mexico Territory (rivalry)	L 6–10		
November 16	vs. New Mexico Normal	St. Michael's College Field; Santa Fe, New Mexico Territory	W 56–0		
November 30	Arizona	Traction Park; Albuquerque, New Mexico Territory (rivalry)	L 0–6	1,000	
