= 1911 Montana Agricultural football team =

American college football season

1911 Montana Agricultural football
- Conference: Independent
- Record: 0–2–1
- Head coach: Earnest A. Dockstader (1st season)
- Home stadium: Fairgrounds

1911 Western college football independents records
	Conf.			Overall
Team	W	L	T	W		L		T
New Mexico A&M		–		7	–	0	–	0
Utah Agricultural		–		4	–	0	–	1
Arizona		–		3	–	1	–	1
Montana		–		2	–	1	–	0
Hawaii		–		2	–	2	–	0
New Mexico		–		1	–	3	–	1
Montana Agricultural		–		0	–	2	–	1

The 1911 Montana Agricultural football team was an American football team that represented the Agricultural College of the State of Montana (later renamed Montana State University) during the 1911 college football season. Led by Earnest A. Dockstader his first season as head coach, they had a 0–2–1 record.

On October 9, freshman player Charles Lange suffered a severe injury to his spine at practice. He died later in the month as a result of this injury, and at that time the remainder of the season was canceled in his memory.

== Schedule ==
Date	Opponent	Site	Result	Source
October 11	Montana Mines	Fairgrounds; Bozeman, MT	T 0–0	
October 25	Utah Agricultural	Fairgrounds; Bozeman, MT	L 0–26	
October 28	at Utah	Cummings Field; Salt Lake City, UT	L 0–97	
