= 1911 Montana football team =

American college football season

1911 Montana football
- Conference: Independent
- Record: 2–1
- Head coach: Robert H. Cary (2nd season)
- Home stadium: Montana Field

1911 Western college football independents records
	Conf.			Overall
Team	W	L	T	W		L		T
New Mexico A&M		–		7	–	0	–	0
Utah Agricultural		–		4	–	0	–	1
Arizona		–		3	–	1	–	1
Montana		–		2	–	1	–	0
Hawaii		–		2	–	2	–	0
New Mexico		–		1	–	3	–	1
Montana Agricultural		–		0	–	2	–	1

The 1911 Montana football team represented the University of Montana in the 1911 college football season. They were led by second-year head coach Robert H. Cary, and finished the season with a record of two wins and one loss (2–1).

== Schedule ==
Date	Opponent	Site	Result	Source
October 21	at Montana Mines	Columbia Gardens; Butte, MT	W 12–0	
October 28	Utah Agricultural	Montana Field; Missoula, MT	L 0–8	
November 4	Polson Independents	Montana Field; Missoula, MT	W 28–6	
