= 1910 New Mexico A&M Aggies football team =

American college football season

1910 New Mexico A&M Aggies football
- Conference: Independent
- Record: 3–2
- Head coach: Art Badenoch (1st season)
- Home stadium: Miller Field

1910 Western college football independents records
	Conf.			Overall
Team	W	L	T	W		L		T
USC		–		7	–	0	–	1
Utah Agricultural		–		5	–	2	–	0
Hawaii		–		4	–	2	–	0
Montana		–		3	–	2	–	1
New Mexico A&M		–		3	–	2	–	0
Wyoming		–		4	–	4	–	0
Montana Agricultural		–		2	–	3	–	2
New Mexico		–		0	–	3	–	0

The 1910 New Mexico A&M Aggies football team was an American football team that represented New Mexico College of Agriculture and Mechanical Arts (now known as New Mexico State University) during the 1910 college football season. In their first year under head coach Art Badenoch, the Aggies compiled a 3–2 record. The team played home games on Miller Field, sometimes also referred to as College Field.

== Schedule ==
Date	Opponent	Site	Result	Source
October 22	vs. El Paso Military Institute	Cowboy Park; Juárez, Mexico	W 12–0	
October 28	El Paso Military Institute	College Field; La Cruces, New Mexico Territory	W 35–0	
November 5	at New Mexico Mines	Socorro, New Mexico Territory	W 14–0	
November 18	at Arizona	Tucson, Arizona Territory	L 2–18	
November 24	New Mexico Military	College Field; La Cruces, New Mexico Territory	L 0–5	
