= 1911 Arizona football team =

American college football season

1911 Arizona football
- Conference: Independent
- Record: 3–1–1
- Head coach: Frank Shipp (2nd season)
- Captain: Clifton Howard Rolfe

1911 Western college football independents records
	Conf.			Overall
Team	W	L	T	W		L		T
New Mexico A&M		–		7	–	0	–	0
Utah Agricultural		–		4	–	0	–	1
Arizona		–		3	–	1	–	1
Montana		–		2	–	1	–	0
Hawaii		–		2	–	2	–	0
New Mexico		–		1	–	3	–	1
Montana Agricultural		–		0	–	2	–	1

The 1911 Arizona football team was an American football team that represented the University of Arizona as an independent during the 1911 college football season. In its second and final season under head coach Frank Shipp, the team compiled a 3–1–1 record, shut our four of five opponents, and outscored all opponents by a total of 16 to 3. The team captain was Clifton Howard Rolfe.

During the final game of the season against New Mexico, the bleachers with 400 persons collapsed, causing several minor injuries.

== Schedule ==
Date	Opponent	Site	Result	Attendance	Source
October 19	vs. New Mexico A&M	Washington Park; El Paso, TX	L 0–3		
	Tucson High School	Tucson, Arizona Territory	T 0–0		
November 18	El Paso Military Institute	Tucson, Arizona Territory	W 5–0		
	Tucson High School	Tucson, Arizona Territory	W 5–0		
November 30	at New Mexico	Traction Park; Albuquerque, New Mexico Territory (rivalry)	W 6–0	1,000	
