= 1910 University of Utah football team =

American college football season

1910 University of Utah football
- Conference: Rocky Mountain Conference
- Record: 4–2 (2–2 RMC)
- Head coach: Fred Bennion (1st season)
- Captain: William "Tiney" Home
- Home stadium: Cummings Field

1910 Rocky Mountain Conference football standings
	Conf.					Overall
Team	W		L		T	W		L		T
Colorado College +	4	–	0	–	0	7	–	0	–	0
Colorado +	3	–	0	–	0	6	–	0	–	0
Utah	2	–	2	–	0	4	–	2	–	0
Denver	2	–	2	–	0	4	–	3	–	1
Colorado Mines	1	–	4	–	0	2	–	4	–	0
Colorado Agricultural	0	–	4	–	0	0	–	5	–	0
+ – Conference co-champions

The 1910 University of Utah football team was an American football team that represented the University of Utah as a member of the Rocky Mountain Conference (RMC) during the 1910 college football season. In its first season under head coach Fred Bennion, the team compiled an overall record of 4–2 record with a mark of 2–2 against conference opponents, tied for third place in the RMC, and outscored all opponents by a total of 70 to 44. The team played its home games at Cummings Field in Salt Lake City. William "Tiney" Home was the team captain.

In January 1910, Bennion was hired as the university's new head coach and athletic director. He had played for the football team earlier in the decade and then served as basketball and baseball coach at Brigham Young University (BYU). In April 1910, the university's petition for admission into the RMC was granted.

== Schedule ==
Date	Opponent	Site	Result	Source
October 8	at Utah Agricultural*	Utah A.C. quad; Logan, UT (rivalry)	W 21–12	
October 15	Colorado Mines	Cummings Field; Salt Lake City, UT	W 6–0	
October 22	Colorado College	Cummings Field; Salt Lake City, UT	L 17–21	
October 29	at Colorado	Gamble Field; Boulder, CO (rivalry)	L 0–11	
November 12	Denver	Cummings Field; Salt Lake City, UT	W 20–0	
November 24	Utah Agricultural*	Cummings Field; Salt Lake City, UT	W 6–0	
*Non-conference game
