= Earnest A. Dockstader =

American football and basketball coach

Biographical details
- Died: September 17, 1970

Coaching career (HC unless noted)

Football
- 1911–1912: Montana Agricultural

Basketball
- 1911–1913: Montana Agricultural

Administrative career (AD unless noted)
- 1911–1913: Montana Agricultural

Head coaching record
- Overall: 0–4–1 (football); 13–7 (basketball)

Earnest Ambrose Dockstader (died September 17, 1970) was an American college football and college basketball coach. He served as the head football coach, and head basketball coach, and athletic director at the Agricultural College of the State of Montana—now known as Montana State University—during the 1911–12 and 1912–13 academic years. During this time he was also a post-graduate student in the school's mathematics department.

== Head coaching record ==
=== Football ===
Year	Team	Overall	Conference	Standing	Bowl/playoffs
Montana Agricultural (Independent) (1911–1912)
1911	Montana Agricultural	0–2–1			
1912	Montana Agricultural	0–2			
Montana Agricultural:		0–4–1			
Total:		0–4–1			
