= 1911 Colorado Silver and Gold football team =

American college football season

1911 Colorado Silver and Gold football

RMC co-champion
- Conference: Rocky Mountain Conference
- Record: 6–0 (5–0 RMC)
- Head coach: Fred Folsom (11th season)
- Captain: John McFadden
- Home stadium: Gamble Field

1911 Rocky Mountain Conference football standings
	Conf.					Overall
Team	W		L		T	W		L		T
Colorado $	5	–	0	–	0	6	–	0	–	0
Utah	3	–	1	–	1	5	–	1	–	1
Denver	3	–	1	–	1	5	–	2	–	1
Colorado College	3	–	2	–	0	4	–	3	–	0
Wyoming	2	–	3	–	0	4	–	3	–	1
Colorado Mines	1	–	5	–	0	2	–	5	–	0
Colorado Agricultural	0	–	5	–	0	0	–	6	–	0
$ – Conference champion

The 1911 Colorado Silver and Gold football team was an American football team that represented the University of Colorado as a member of the Rocky Mountain Conference (RMC) during the 1911 college football season. In its 11th year under head coach Fred Folsom, the team compiled a 6–0 record (5–0 against RMC opponents), won the conference championship, and outscored opponents by a total of 88 to 5.

Colorado sustained a 21-game win streak that began on November 26, 1908, and ended on October 12, 1912. It remains the longest such streak in program history.

== Schedule ==
Date	Opponent	Site	Result	Source
October 14	Colorado alumni*	Gamble Field; Boulder, CO	W 11–0	
October 28	Wyoming	Gamble Field; Boulder, CO	W 18–3	
November 4	Colorado College	Gamble Field; Boulder, CO	W 8–2	
November 11	Colorado Agricultural	Gamble Field; Boulder, CO (rivalry)	W 31–0	
November 18	at Utah	Cummings Field; Salt Lake City, UT (rivalry)	W 9–0	
November 30	at Colorado Mines	Golden, CO	W 11–0	
*Non-conference game
