= 1910 University of New Mexico football team =

American college football season

1910 University of New Mexico football
- Conference: Independent
- Record: 0–3
- Head coach: Carl Hamilton (1st season)
- Home stadium: Traction Park

1910 Western college football independents records
	Conf.			Overall
Team	W	L	T	W		L		T
USC		–		7	–	0	–	1
Utah Agricultural		–		5	–	2	–	0
Hawaii		–		4	–	2	–	0
Montana		–		3	–	2	–	1
New Mexico A&M		–		3	–	2	–	0
Wyoming		–		4	–	4	–	0
Montana Agricultural		–		2	–	3	–	2
New Mexico		–		0	–	3	–	0

The 1910 University of New Mexico football team was an American football team that represented the University of New Mexico as an independent during the 1910 college football season. In its first and only season under head coach Carl Hamilton (sometimes listed as H. B. Hamilton), the team compiled a 0–3 record, failed to score a point during the season, and was outscored by a total of 90 to 0. The team played its only home game at Albuquerque's Traction Park.

The team struggled to secure funding. The 1909 team had finished its season with a deficit, the board of regents passed a resolution prohibiting the student body for incurring debt to fund the football team. The regents appropriated $500 to fund the team, but only on the condition that the students could raise an additional $1,000. Two weeks before the season began, The Albuquerque Morning Journal described the football prospects as "rather gloomy".

With the season in doubt, university president E. McQueen Gray addressed a mass meeting of students on October 10 and announced that the football season would proceed. H. B. Hamilton, who coached at Albuquerque High School in 1909, was hired to coach the team.

The team's 80-point loss to New Mexico Military on November 4, 1910, was the worst defeat in program history to that point. The 1917 team now holds that record after its 107-point loss to New Mexico A&M.

Four days after the loss to the Military Institute, university president Gray directed the athletic council to cancel the remainder of the season, which was to have included games against the El Paso Military Institute, New Mexico A&M, and Arizona. As a result of the cancellation, the Arizona game was deemed a forfeit, and the territorial cup for which the teams played was returned to Arizona.

Walter R. Allen, who played at the center position, was the 1910 team captain. Other players included Lyle Abbott, Allen (center), B. Arens (guard/end/halfback), W. Arens (tackle), C.L. Bernard (forward), Hugh Carlisle (end), Ed DeWolf (guard), R.D. Gladding (guard), James Hamilton (tackle), Harold Hill (halfback), Karl Karsten (guard), Charles Lembke (forward), H.E. Marsh (guard/tackle), Patterson (halfback), Howard Seder (forward), Lawrence Selva (end), and E. Smith (halfback).

== Schedule ==
Date	Opponent	Site	Result	Source
October 22	New Mexico Mines	Traction Park; Albuquerque, New Mexico Territory	L 0–9	
November 4	at New Mexico Military	Roswell, New Mexico Territory	L 0–80	
November 24	at Arizona	Tucson, Arizona Territory (rivalry)	L 0–1 (forfeit)	
