= Fred Bennion =

American sports coach, athletics administrator (1884–1960)

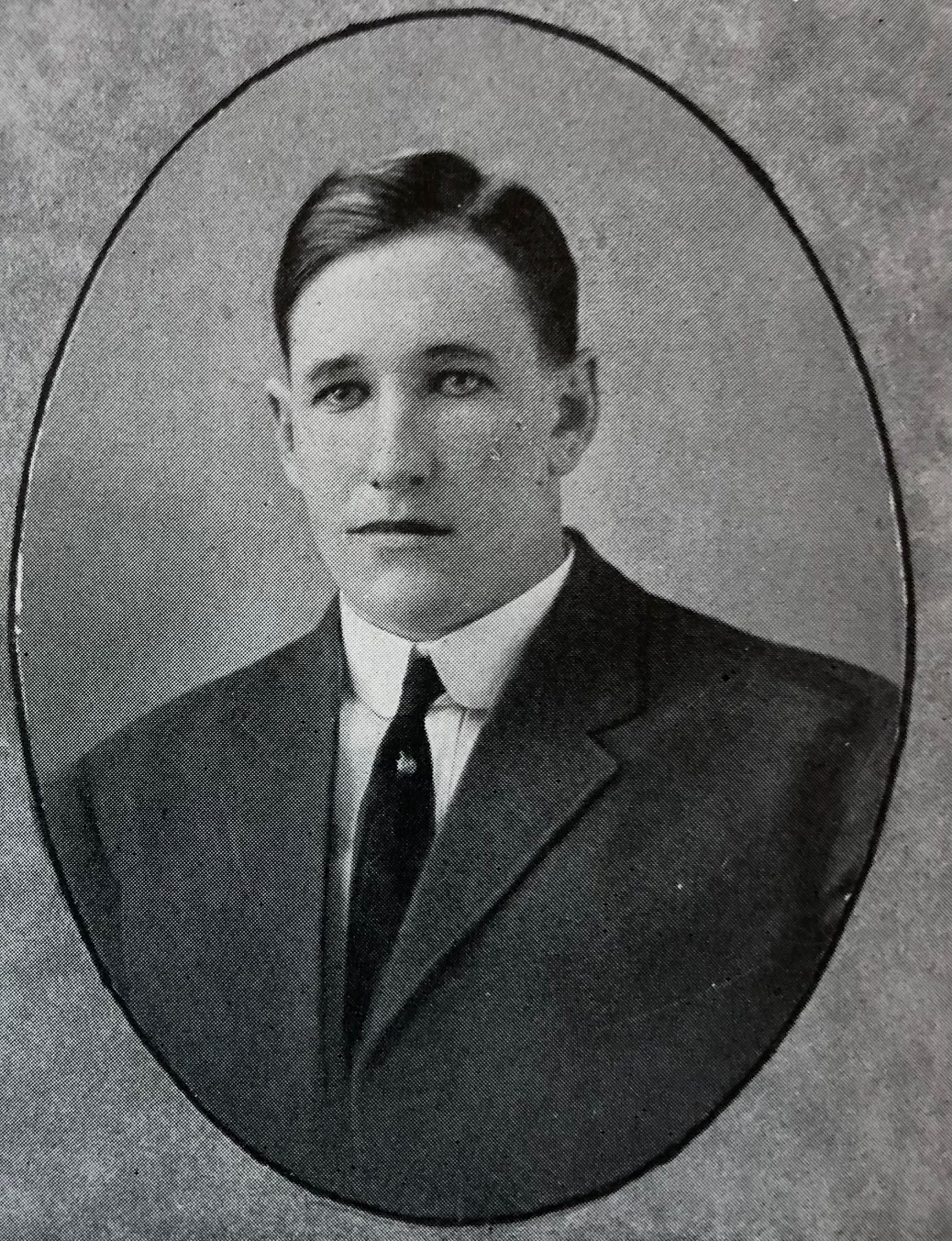
- Bennion from the 1916 Montanan

Biographical details
- Born: September 24, 1884; Detroit, Michigan, U.S.
- Died: January 18, 1960 (aged 75); Denver, Colorado, U.S.

Playing career

Football
- 1902: Utah
- 1904–1906: Utah

Coaching career (HC unless noted)

Football
- 1910–1913: Utah
- 1914–1917: Montana A&M / State

Basketball
- 1908–1910: BYU
- 1911–1914: Utah
- 1914–1919: Montana A&M / State

Baseball
- 1909–1912: BYU

Administrative career (AD unless noted)
- 1914–1918: Montana A&M / State

Head coaching record
- Overall: 27–15–8 (football); 96–31 (basketball); 11–10 (baseball)

Fred W. Bennion (September 29, 1884 – January 18, 1960) was an American football player, coach of football, basketball and baseball, and college athletics administrator. He served as the head football coach at the University of Utah from 1910 to 1913 and at the Agricultural College of the State of Montana—now Montana State University—from 1914 to 1917, compiling a career college football record of 27–15–8. Bennion was also the head basketball coach at Brigham Young University (BYU) from 1908 to 1910, at Utah from 1911 to 1914, and at Montana Agricultural from 1914 to 1919, amassing a career college basketball record of 96–31. In addition, He was the head baseball coach at BYU from 1909 to 1912, tallying a mark of 11–10.

A native of Murray, Utah, Bennion was a graduate of the University of Pennsylvania and the University of Utah. He also studied agriculture at Montana State. Following his coaching career, he worked as an agricultural agent in Umatilla County, Oregon and Montana during the 1920s. He was later the director of the Montana Taxpayers Association. From 1946 to 1955, Bennion served as the executive director of the Colorado Pueblo Expenditures Council in Denver. He died on January 18, 1960, at his home in Denver, following a short illness.

== Head coaching record ==
=== Football ===
Year	Team	Overall	Conference	Standing	Bowl/playoffs
Utah Utes (Rocky Mountain Conference) (1910–1913)
1910	Utah	4–2	2–2	T–3rd	
1911	Utah	5–1–1	3–1–1	T–2nd	
1912	Utah	5–1–1	4–1	2nd	
1913	Utah	2–4–1	1–2	5th	
Utah:		16–8–3	0–6		
Montana A&M / Montana State Bobcats (Independent) (1914–1916)
1914	Montana A&M	5–1			
1915	Montana A&M	4–2–1			
1916	Montana State	2–2–2			
Montana State Bobcats (Rocky Mountain Conference) (1917)
1917	Montana State	0–2–2			
Montana A&M / State:		11–7–5			
Total:		27–15–8			
