= 1910 Colorado Agricultural Aggies football team =

American college football season

1910 Colorado Agricultural Aggies football
- Conference: Rocky Mountain Conference
- Record: 0–5 (0–4 RMC)
- Head coach: George Cassidy (1st season)
- Home stadium: Durkee Field

1910 Rocky Mountain Conference football standings
	Conf.					Overall
Team	W		L		T	W		L		T
Colorado College +	4	–	0	–	0	7	–	0	–	0
Colorado +	3	–	0	–	0	6	–	0	–	0
Utah	2	–	2	–	0	4	–	2	–	0
Denver	2	–	2	–	0	4	–	3	–	1
Colorado Mines	1	–	4	–	0	2	–	4	–	0
Colorado Agricultural	0	–	4	–	0	0	–	5	–	0
+ – Conference co-champions

The 1910 Colorado Agricultural Aggies football team represented Colorado Agricultural College (now known as Colorado State University) in the Rocky Mountain Conference (RMC) during the 1910 college football season. In their first and only season under head coach George Cassidy, the Aggies compiled a 0–5 record, failed to score a point in the final five games of the season, and were outscored by a total of 110 to 6.

== Schedule ==
Date	Opponent	Site	Result	Source
October 22	at Colorado Mines	Golden, CO	L 6–10	
October 29	Denver	Durkee Field; Fort Collins, CO	L 0–22	
November 5	Colorado	Durkee Field; Fort Collins, CO (rivalry)	L 0–44	
November 12	Colorado College	Durkee Field; Fort Collins, CO	L 0–24	
November 24	at Wyoming*	Laramie, WY (rivalry)	L 0–10	
*Non-conference game
