= Harold Dean (footballer) =

English footballer

Personal information
- Full name: Harold Dean
- Date of birth: 1910
- Place of birth: Hulme, Lancashire, England
- Position: Centre-forward

Youth career
- ?–1931: Old Trafford

Senior career*
Years	Team	Apps	(Gls)
1931	Manchester United	2	(0)
1931–?	Mossley		
- * Club domestic league appearances and goals

Harold Dean (born 1910) was an English footballer who played as a centre-forward. Born in Hulme, Manchester, he played for Old Trafford, Manchester United and Mossley.

Following Manchester United's relegation to the Second Division at the end of the 1930–31 season, Dean was one of 31 amateur players signed by the club. He joined from the nearby Old Trafford Amateur club and made his debut in a 3–1 win at home to Chesterfield on 26 September 1931, filling in for the absent Tommy Reid. He also played in the next game, a 2–0 defeat at Burnley, but while his speed and effort were praised, his control and shooting were deemed not to be up to scratch. He did not play for Manchester United again and was transferred to Cheshire County League side Mossley in December 1931.
