= 1910 Colorado College Tigers football team =

American college football season

1910 Colorado College Tigers football

RMC co-champion
- Conference: Rocky Mountain Conference
- Record: 7–0 (4–0 RMC)
- Head coach: Claude Rothgeb (1st season)
- Home stadium: Washburn Field

1910 Rocky Mountain Conference football standings
	Conf.					Overall
Team	W		L		T	W		L		T
Colorado College +	4	–	0	–	0	7	–	0	–	0
Colorado +	3	–	0	–	0	6	–	0	–	0
Utah	2	–	2	–	0	4	–	2	–	0
Denver	2	–	2	–	0	4	–	3	–	1
Colorado Mines	1	–	4	–	0	2	–	4	–	0
Colorado Agricultural	0	–	4	–	0	0	–	5	–	0
+ – Conference co-champions

The 1910 Colorado College Tigers football team represented Colorado College as a member of the Rocky Mountain Conference (RMC) during the 1910 college football season. Led by first-year head coach Claude Rothgeb, the Tigers compiled an overall record of 7–0 with a mark of 4–0 in conference play, sharing the RMC title with Colorado.

== Schedule ==
Date	Opponent	Site	Result
October 8	Colorado Springs High*	Washburn Field; Colorado Springs, CO	W 23–0
October 15	Wyoming*	Washburn Field; Colorado Springs, CO	W 23–0
October 22	at Utah	Cummings Field; Salt Lake City, UT	W 21–17
October 29	Colorado Mines	Washburn Field; Colorado Springs, CO	W 8–0
November 5	Kansas State*	Washburn Field; Colorado Springs, CO	W 15–8
November 12	at Colorado Agricultural	Fort Collins, CO	W 24–0
November 24	at Denver	Denver, CO	W 6–5
*Non-conference game
