= 1910 Montana Agricultural football team =

American college football season

1910 Montana Agricultural football
- Conference: Independent
- Record: 2–3–2
- Head coach: John H. McIntosh (3rd season)
- Home stadium: Fairgrounds

1910 Western college football independents records
	Conf.			Overall
Team	W	L	T	W		L		T
USC		–		7	–	0	–	1
Utah Agricultural		–		5	–	2	–	0
Hawaii		–		4	–	2	–	0
Montana		–		3	–	2	–	1
New Mexico A&M		–		3	–	2	–	0
Wyoming		–		4	–	4	–	0
Montana Agricultural		–		2	–	3	–	2
New Mexico		–		0	–	3	–	0

The 1910 Montana Agricultural football team was an American football team that represented the Agricultural College of the State of Montana (later renamed Montana State University) during the 1910 college football season. Led by John H. McIntosh his third season as head coach, they had a 2–3–2 record.

== Schedule ==
Date	Opponent	Site	Result	Source
October 8	Butte High School	Fairgrounds; Bozeman, MT	W 3–0	
October 15	at Montana Mines	Columbia Gardens; Butte, MT	L 0–14	
October 21	Montana	Fairgrounds; Bozeman, MT (rivalry)	T 0–0	
October 28	Montana Mines	Fairgrounds; Bozeman, MT	T 0–0	
November 9	Utah Agricultural	Fairgrounds; Bozeman, MT	L 0–19	
November 19	Butte Columbias	Fairgrounds; Bozeman, MT	W 2–0	
November 24	at Montana	Missoula, MT	L 0–10	
