= George Cassidy (coach) =

American sports coach and athletics administrator

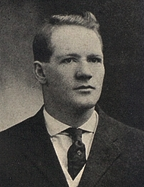
- Cassidy pictured in Ariel 1910, Vermont yearbook

Biographical details
- Born: October 10, 1881; Poultney, Vermont, U.S.
- Died: October 5, 1966 (aged 84); Rutland, Vermont, U.S.
- Education: University of Vermont (1910)

Playing career

Football
- 1909: Vermont
- Position: Guard

Coaching career (HC unless noted)

Football
- 1910: Colorado Agricultural
- 1911–1912: Saint Anselm
- 1920–1932: New Britain HS (CT)

Basketball
- 1910–1911: Colorado Agricultural

Baseball
- 1911: Colorado Agricultural
- 1912–1913: Saint Anselm

Administrative career (AD unless noted)
- 1910–1911: Colorado Agricultural
- 1911–1913: Saint Anselm
- 1913–1920: University of the Philippines

Head coaching record
- Overall: 5–11 (college football); 5–4 (college basketball)

George Michael "Pop" Cassidy (October 10, 1881 – October 5, 1966) was an American college football, college basketball, and college baseball coach and athletics administrator. He served as the head football coach at Colorado Agricultural College—now known as Colorado State University—for one season, in 1910, compiling a record of 0–5. Cassidy was also the head basketball coach at Colorado Agricultural for the 1910–11 season, tallying a mark of 5–4.

Cassidy was born on October 10, 1881, in Poultney, Vermont, to Francis and Mary (Leany) Cassidy. He attended Troy Conference Academy—now known as Green Mountain College—in Poultney. Cassidy attended the University of Vermont, where he participiated in football, basketball and baseball and track. After graduating from Vermont in 1910, Cassidy spent a year at Colorado Agricultural College. From 1911 to 1913, he coach and served as athletic director at Saint Anselm College in Goffstown, New Hampshire. He left the United States in 1913 to coach and direct athletics at the University of the Philippines in Manila. From 1920 to 1932, Cassidy coached football at New Britain High School in New Britain, Connecticut. There he mentored Abraham Ribicoff, who was later the government of Connecticut and United States Secretary of Health, Education, and Welfare.

Cassidy died on October 5, 1966, at Rutland Hospital in Rutland, Vermont.

== Head coaching record ==
=== Collegge football ===
Year	Team	Overall	Conference	Standing
Colorado Agricultural Aggies (Rocky Mountain Conference) (1910)
1910	Colorado Agricultural	0–5	0–4	6th
Colorado Agricultural:		0–5	0–4	
Saint Anselm (Independent) (1911–1912)
1911	Saint Anselm	5–0		
1912	Saint Anselm	0–6		
Saint Anselm:		5–6		
Total:		5–11		
