= 1911 Utah Agricultural Aggies football team =

American college football season

1911 Utah Agricultural Aggies football
- Conference: Independent
- Record: 4–0–1
- Head coach: Clayton Teetzel (3rd season)
- Home stadium: U.A.C. gridiron

1911 Western college football independents records
	Conf.			Overall
Team	W	L	T	W		L		T
New Mexico A&M		–		7	–	0	–	0
Utah Agricultural		–		4	–	0	–	1
Arizona		–		3	–	1	–	1
Montana		–		2	–	1	–	0
Hawaii		–		2	–	2	–	0
New Mexico		–		1	–	3	–	1
Montana Agricultural		–		0	–	2	–	1

The 1911 Utah Agricultural Aggies football team was an American football team that represented Utah Agricultural College (later renamed Utah State University) as an independent during the 1911 college football season. In their third season under head coach Clayton Teetzel, the Aggies compiled a 4–0–1 record, shut out all five opponents, and outscored opponents by a total of 144 to 0.

The team's 83–0 victory over Idaho State (reported in some sources as 88–0) remains the third largest margin of victory in Utah State history.

== Schedule ==
Date	Opponent	Site	Result	Source
September 30	Alumni All Stars	U.A.C. gridiron; Logan, UT	T 0–0	
October 9	Colorado Agricultural	U.A.C. gridiron; Logan, UT	W 29–0	
October 14	Academy of Idaho	U.A.C. gridiron; Logan, UT	W 83–0	
October 25	at Montana Agricultural	Inter-State Fairgrounds; Bozeman, MT	W 26–0	
October 28	at Montana	Montana Field; Missoula, MT	W 8–0	
