= Harold I. Dean =

American football and basketball coach (1884–1949)

Biographical details
- Born: May 8, 1884; Richburg, New York, U.S.
- Died: April 5, 1949 (aged 64); San Diego, California, U.S.
- Education: Ohio Wesleyan (1907)

Playing career

Football
- 1905–1906: Ohio Wesleyan

Coaching career (HC unless noted)

Football
- 1909–1911: Wyoming

Basketball
- 1910–1912: Wyoming

Head coaching record
- Overall: 11–12–1 (football); 9–13 (basketball)

Harold Isaac Dean (May 8, 1884 – April 5, 1949) was an American college football and college basketball coach and United States Army officer. He served as the head football coach at the University of Wyoming from 1909 to 1911, compiling a record of 11–12–1. Dean was he also the head basketball coach at Wyoming from 1910 to 1912, tallying a mark of 9–13. He graduated from Ohio Wesleyan University in 1907.

Dean was born in Richburg, New York. He served as an officer in the United States Army Reserve from 1918 until 1942, when he moved to active service as an infantry major. Dean retired in 1944, and moved to Chula Vista, California. He died on April 5, 1949, at the Naval Hospital in San Diego. Dean was buried at Fort Rosecrans National Cemetery in San Diego.

== Head coaching record ==
=== Football ===
Year	Team	Overall	Conference	Standing	Bowl/playoffs
Wyoming Cowboys (Independent) (1909–1910)
1909	Wyoming	3–5			
1910	Wyoming	4–4			
Wyoming Cowboys (Rocky Mountain Conference) (1911)
1911	Wyoming	4–3–1	2–3	5th	
Wyoming:		11–12–1	2–3		
Total:		11–12–1			
