= 1910 Colorado Silver and Gold football team =

American college football season

1910 Colorado Silver and Gold football

RMC co-champion
- Conference: Rocky Mountain Conference
- Record: 6–0 (3–0 RMC)
- Head coach: Fred Folsom (10th season)
- Captain: John O'Brien
- Home stadium: Gamble Field

1910 Rocky Mountain Conference football standings
	Conf.					Overall
Team	W		L		T	W		L		T
Colorado College +	4	–	0	–	0	7	–	0	–	0
Colorado +	3	–	0	–	0	6	–	0	–	0
Utah	2	–	2	–	0	4	–	2	–	0
Denver	2	–	2	–	0	4	–	3	–	1
Colorado Mines	1	–	4	–	0	2	–	4	–	0
Colorado Agricultural	0	–	4	–	0	0	–	5	–	0
+ – Conference co-champions

The 1910 Colorado Silver and Gold football team was an American football team that represented the University of Colorado as a member of the Rocky Mountain Conference (RMC) during the 1910 college football season. In its tenth year under head coach Fred Folsom, the team compiled a 6–0 record (3–0 against RMC opponents), shut out five of six opponents, won the conference championship, and outscored opponents by a total of 121 to 3.

Colorado sustained a 21-game win streak that began on November 26, 1908, and ended on October 12, 1912. It remains the longest such streak in program history.

The 1910 season was the first for the newly-named Rocky Mountain Conference, which had previously been the Colorado Faculty Athletic Conference, but was renamed with the addition of two schools (Utah and Wyoming) from outside Colorado.

== Schedule ==
Date	Opponent	Site	Result	Source
October 1	Boulder High School*	Gamble Field; Boulder, CO	W 20–0	
October 8	Colorado alumni*	Gamble Field; Boulder, CO	W 11–0	
October 22	at Wyoming*	Laramie, WY	W 14–3	
October 29	vs. Utah	Union Park; Denver, CO (rivalry)	W 11–0	
November 5	at Colorado Agricultural	Durkee Field; Fort Collins, CO (rivalry)	W 44–0	
November 24	vs. Colorado Mines	Denver, CO	W 19–0	
*Non-conference game
