= 1910 Wyoming Cowboys football team =

American college football season

1910 Wyoming Cowboys football
- Conference: Independent
- Record: 4–4
- Head coach: Harold I. Dean (2nd season)
- Captain: Harry H. Hill

1910 Western college football independents records
	Conf.			Overall
Team	W	L	T	W		L		T
USC		–		7	–	0	–	1
Utah Agricultural		–		5	–	2	–	0
Hawaii		–		4	–	2	–	0
Montana		–		3	–	2	–	1
New Mexico A&M		–		3	–	2	–	0
Wyoming		–		4	–	4	–	0
Montana Agricultural		–		2	–	3	–	2
New Mexico		–		0	–	3	–	0

The 1910 Wyoming Cowboys football team represented the University of Wyoming as an independent the 1910 college football season. In its second season under head coach Harold I. Dean, the team compiled a 4–4 record and outscored opponents by a total of 107 to 77. Harry H. Hill was the team captain

== Schedule ==
Date	Opponent	Site	Result	Source
October 1	at Cheyenne High School	Cheyenne, WY	W 61–12	
October 8	at Denver	Denver, CO	L 3–17	
October 15	at Colorado College	Washburn Field; Colorado Springs, CO	L 0–23	
October 22	at Colorado	Gamble Field; Boulder, CO	L 3–14	
November 8	Wyoming all-star alumni	Laramie, WY	W 17–0	
November 12	vs. Colorado Mines	Union Park; Denver, CO	L 8–9	
November 19	Nebraska Wesleyan	Laramie, WY	W 5–0	
November 24	Colorado Agricultural	Laramie, WY (rivalry)	W 10–0	
