= 1910 Utah Agricultural Aggies football team =

American college football season

1910 Utah Agricultural Aggies football
- Conference: Independent
- Record: 5–2
- Head coach: Clayton Teetzel (2nd season)
- Home stadium: U.A.C. gridiron

1910 Western college football independents records
| | Conf. | | | Overall |
| Team | W | L | T | W | | L | | T |
|---|---|---|---|---|---|---|---|---|
| USC | | – | | 7 | – | 0 | – | 1 |
| Utah Agricultural | | – | | 5 | – | 2 | – | 0 |
| Hawaii | | – | | 4 | – | 2 | – | 0 |
| Montana | | – | | 3 | – | 2 | – | 1 |
| New Mexico A&M | | – | | 3 | – | 2 | – | 0 |
| Wyoming | | – | | 4 | – | 4 | – | 0 |
| Montana Agricultural | | – | | 2 | – | 3 | – | 2 |
| New Mexico | | – | | 0 | – | 3 | – | 0 |

The 1910 Utah Agricultural Aggies football team was an American football team that represented Utah Agricultural College (later renamed Utah State University) as an independent during the 1910 college football season. In their second season under head coach Clayton Teetzel, the Aggies compiled a 5–2 record and outscored opponents by a total of 104 to 33.

== Schedule ==
| Date | Opponent | Site | Result | Source |
|---|---|---|---|---|
| October 1 | Ogden High School | U.A.C. gridiron; Logan, UT | W 18–3 | |
| October 8 | Utah | U.A.C. gridiron; Logan, UT (rivalry) | L 12–21 | |
| October 15 | Idaho State | U.A.C. gridiron; Logan, UT | W 45–0 | |
| November 2 | at Montana | Missoula, MT | W 5–3 | |
| November 6 | at Montana Mines | Butte Gardens; Butte, MT | W 5–0 | |
| November 9 | at Montana Agricultural | Bozeman, MT | W 19–0 | |
| November 24 | at Utah | Cummings Field; Salt Lake City, UT | L 0–6 | |
