= 1911 New Mexico A&M Aggies football team =

American college football season

1911 New Mexico A&M Aggies football
- Conference: Independent
- Record: 7–0
- Head coach: Art Badenoch (2nd season)
- Home stadium: Miller Field

1911 Western college football independents records
	Conf.			Overall
Team	W	L	T	W		L		T
New Mexico A&M		–		7	–	0	–	0
Utah Agricultural		–		4	–	0	–	1
Arizona		–		3	–	1	–	1
Montana		–		2	–	1	–	0
Hawaii		–		2	–	2	–	0
New Mexico		–		1	–	3	–	1
Montana Agricultural		–		0	–	2	–	1

The 1911 New Mexico A&M Aggies football team was an American football team that represented New Mexico College of Agriculture and Mechanical Arts (now known as New Mexico State University) during the 1911 college football season. In their second year under head coach Art Badenoch, the Aggies compiled a 7–0 record, shut out six opponents, and outscored all opponents by a total of 193 to 6. The team played home games on Miller Field, sometimes also referred to as College Field.

At the end of the season, three Aggies players were named to the All-Southwest football team selected by The Albuquerque Morning Journal: Richard Quesenberry (tackle); Roy Boat (end); and Samuel Bousman (fullback).

The game between New Mexico A&M and Arizona was played in El Paso, Texas, as part of the Statehood Football Tournament celebrating the admission of New Mexico and Arizona as the country's 47th and 48th states in early 1912.

== Schedule ==
Date	Opponent	Site	Result	Source
October 7	El Paso Military Institute	Miller Field; Mesilla Park, New Mexico Territory	W 3–0	
October 14	El Paso YMCA	Miller Field; Mesilla Park, New Mexico Territory	W 37–0	
October 19	vs. Arizona	Washington Park; El Paso, TX	W 3–0	
October 28	El Paso High School	Miller Field; Mesilla Park, New Mexico Territory	W 76–0	
November 12	New Mexico	Miller Field; Mesilla Park, New Mexico Territory (rivalry)	W 10–6	
November 18	at El Paso YMCA	Washington Park; El Paso, TX	W 28–0	
December 1	at New Mexico Military	Baumer Park; Roswell, New Mexico Territory	W 36–0	
