= Art Badenoch =

American football player, sports coach, and administrator (1884–1972)

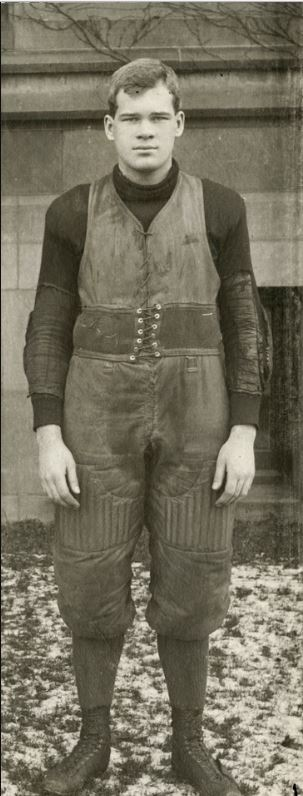

Biographical details
- Born: November 13, 1884; Chicago, Illinois, U.S.
- Died: September 15, 1972 (aged 87); Chico, California, U.S.

Playing career

Football
- 1905: Chicago
- Position: Tackle

Coaching career (HC unless noted)

Football
- 1906: Rose Polytechnic
- 1910–1913: New Mexico A&M

Basketball
- 1910–1913: New Mexico A&M

Baseball
- 1913: New Mexico A&M

Administrative career (AD unless noted)
- 1906–1907: Rose Polytechnic
- 1907–1908: Brigham Young College
- 1908–1910: Illinois Athletic Club
- 1911–1914: New Mexico A&M

Head coaching record
- Overall: 23–7–2 (football); 3–22 (basketball); 2–0 (baseball)

Accomplishments and honors

Championships
- National (1905)

Arthur Hill Badenoch (November 13, 1884 – September 15, 1972) was an American football player, coach of football, basketball, and baseball, and college athletics administrator. Badenoch played college football at the University of Chicago. There he played as a tackle under Amos Alonzo Stagg. Badenoch served as the head football coach at Rose Polytechnic Institute—now Rose-Hulman Institute of Technology—in 1906 and at New Mexico College of Agriculture and Mechanic Arts—now New Mexico State University—from 1910 to 1913, compiling a career college football coaching record of 23–7–2. He was also the head basketball coach at New Mexico A&M from 1910 to 1913 and the school's head baseball coach in 1913. Badenoch served at the athletic director at Rose Polytechnic during the 1906–07 academic year. He held the same position the following year (1907–08) at the now-defunct Brigham Young College in Logan, Utah. From 1908 to 1910, Badenoch was the athletic director of the Illinois Athletic Club in Chicago, Illinois.

Badenoch was born on November 13, 1884, in Chicago to Joseph Badenoch and Elizabeth Hill. He was married to Marion Lucille Bean on August 25, 1908.

== Head coaching record ==
=== Football ===
Year	Team	Overall	Conference	Standing	Bowl/playoffs
Rose Polytechnic (Independent) (1906)
1906	Rose Polytechnic	1–4–1			
Rose Polytechnic:		1–4–1			
New Mexico A&M Aggies (Independent) (1910–1913)
1910	New Mexico A&M	3–2			
1911	New Mexico A&M	7–0			
1912	New Mexico A&M	5–1			
1913	New Mexico A&M	7–0–1			
New Mexico A&M:		22–3–1			
Total:		23–7–2			
