= 1910 Montana football team =

American college football season

1910 Montana football
- Conference: Independent
- Record: 3–2–1
- Head coach: Robert H. Cary (1st season)

1910 Western college football independents records
	Conf.			Overall
Team	W	L	T	W		L		T
USC		–		7	–	0	–	1
Utah Agricultural		–		5	–	2	–	0
Hawaii		–		4	–	2	–	0
Montana		–		3	–	2	–	1
New Mexico A&M		–		3	–	2	–	0
Wyoming		–		4	–	4	–	0
Montana Agricultural		–		2	–	3	–	2
New Mexico		–		0	–	3	–	0

The 1910 Montana football team represented the University of Montana in the 1910 college football season. They were led by first-year head coach Robert H. Cary, and finished the season with a record of three wins, two losses and one tie (3–2–1).

== Schedule ==
Date	Opponent	Site	Result	Source
October 7	Montana Mines	Missoula, MT	W 8–0	
October 21	at Montana Agricultural	Bozeman, MT (rivalry)	T 0–0	
November 2	Utah Agricultural	Missoula, MT	L 3–5	
November 5	at Gonzaga	Recreation Park; Spokane, WA	L 5–17	
November 12	at Montana Mines	Columbia Gardens; Butte, MT	W 3–0	
November 24	Montana Agricultural	Missoula, MT	W 10–0	
