= 1910 USC Methodists football team =

American college football season

1910 USC Methodists football
- Conference: Independent
- Record: 7–0–1
- Head coach: Dean Cromwell (2nd season)
- Captain: Jack Malcolm
- Home stadium: Bovard Field

1910 Western college football independents records
	Conf.			Overall
Team	W	L	T	W		L		T
USC		–		7	–	0	–	1
Utah Agricultural		–		5	–	2	–	0
Hawaii		–		4	–	2	–	0
Montana		–		3	–	2	–	1
New Mexico A&M		–		3	–	2	–	0
Wyoming		–		4	–	4	–	0
Montana Agricultural		–		2	–	3	–	2
New Mexico		–		0	–	3	–	0

The 1910 USC Methodists football team was an American football team that represented the University of Southern California during the 1910 college football season. The team competed as an independent under head coach Dean Cromwell, compiling a 7–0–1 record. Football ceased until the 1914 season and then resumed under the "Trojans" nickname.

== Schedule ==
Date	Time	Opponent	Site	Result	Attendance	Source
October 5		Long Beach Poly High School	Los Angeles, CA	W 22–6		
October 8		Chaffey High School	Bovard Field; Los Angeles, CA	W 65–6		
October 15		at Throop	Elementary grounds near Tournament Park; Pasadena, CA	W 9–0		
October 22		at San Diego High School	San Diego, CA	W 32–0		
October 29		at Redlands	Redlands, CA	W 35–0		
November 5	2:17 p.m.	Occidental	Bovard Field; Los Angeles, CA	W 6–0	5,000	
November 12		at Whittier	Whittier, CA	W 11–3	300–2,000	
November 19		at Pomona	Alumni Field; Claremont, CA	T 9–9	2,500–4,000	
