= 1911 Hawaii Fighting Deans football team =

American college football season

1911 Hawaii Fighting Deans football
- Conference: Independent
- Record: 2–2
- Head coach: Austin Jones (3rd season)
- Home stadium: Moiliili Field

1911 Western college football independents records
	Conf.			Overall
Team	W	L	T	W		L		T
New Mexico A&M		–		7	–	0	–	0
Utah Agricultural		–		4	–	0	–	1
Arizona		–		3	–	1	–	1
Montana		–		2	–	1	–	0
Hawaii		–		2	–	2	–	0
New Mexico		–		1	–	3	–	1
Montana Agricultural		–		0	–	2	–	1

The 1911 Hawaii Fighting Deans football team represented the College of Agriculture and Mechanic Arts of the Territory of Hawaiʻi—now known as the University of Hawaiʻi at Mānoa–as an independent during the 1911 college football season. In their third and final season under head coach Austin Jones, the Fighting Deans compiled a 2–2 record.

== Schedule ==
Date	Time	Opponent	Site	Result	Source
October 28		McKinley High School	Moiliili Field; Honolulu, Territory of Hawaii	W 21–0	
November 11	3:30 p.m.	at Oahu College	Alexander Field; Honolulu, Territory of Hawaii	L 0–17	
November 18	3:30 p.m.	McKinley High School	Moiliili Field; Honolulu, Territory of Hawaii	W 6–3	
November 30	3:00 p.m.	Oahu College	Moiliili Field; Honolulu, Territory of Hawaii	L 5–29	
