= Frank Shipp =

American football and baseball player (1884–1934)

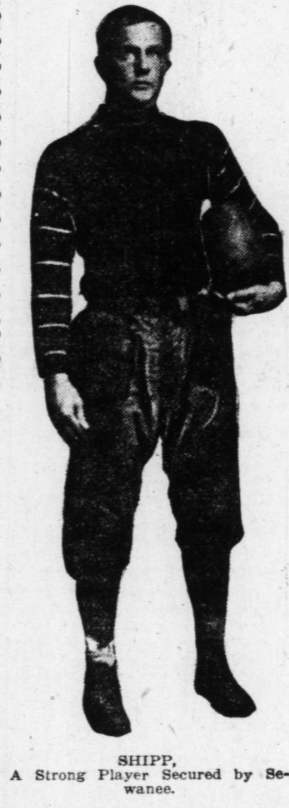
- Shipp, c. 1906

Biographical details
- Born: July 23, 1884; Chattanooga, Tennessee, U.S.
- Died: December 10, 1934 (aged 50); Chattanooga, Tennessee, U.S.

Playing career

Football
- 1906–1907: Sewanee
- 1909: Texas A&M

Baseball
- 1904: Chattanooga
- 1908: Vancouver Beavers
- 1912: Anniston Models
- Positions: Halfback, end (football)

Coaching career (HC unless noted)

Football
- 1910–1911: Arizona

Head coaching record
- Overall: 8–1–1

Accomplishments and honors

Awards
- 2× All-Southern (1906, 1907); 2nd team all-time Sewanee football team

Frank Sterling "Skinny" Shipp (July 23, 1884 – December 10, 1934) was an American college football player and coach, and Minor League Baseball player. He played football at Sewanee: The University of the South in 1906 and 1907 and was a two-time All-Southern selection. After playing for a year at Texas A&M University in 1909, Shipp, served as the head football coach at the University of Arizona for two seasons, from 1910 to 1911, compiling a record of 8–1–1.

== College football playing career ==
Shipp was a prominent halfback for the Sewanee Tigers football team of Sewanee: The University of the South, selected second-team for an all-time Sewanee team.

=== 1906 ===
Shipp was selected All-Southern at end by Dan McGugin.

=== 1907 ===
Shipp was selected All-Southern in 1907, one of Sewanee's greatest years.

== Baseball career ==
Shipp played minor league baseball for the Denver Bears in the Western League.

== Coaching career ==
Shipp was hired as the head football coach at the University of Arizona in 1910 and retained the following season.

== Late life and death ==
Shipp later worked at a private investigator in his hometown of Chattanooga, Tennessee and was active in politics there as a Democratic. He ran for criminal court clerk in 1930 and sherriff in 1934, losing both elections. Shipp died of an apparent heart attack, on December 10, 1934, at his place of business, in Chattanooga.

== Head coaching record ==
| Year | Team | Overall | Conference | Standing | Bowl/playoffs |
|---|---|---|---|---|---|
Arizona (Independent) (1910–1911)
| 1910 | Arizona | 5–0 | | | |
| 1911 | Arizona | 3–1–1 | | | |
| Arizona: | | 8–1–1 | | | |
| Total: | | 8–1–1 | | | |
