= Austin Jones (coach) =

American football coach

Coaching career (HC unless noted)
- 1909–1911: Hawaii

Head coaching record
- Overall: 8–6

Austin Jones was an American college football coach. He became the first head football coach at the College of Hawaii, which later became the University of Hawaiʻi.

== Head coaching record ==
| Year | Team | Overall | Conference | Standing | Bowl/playoffs |
|---|---|---|---|---|---|
Hawaii Fighting Deans (Independent) (1909–1911)
| 1909 | Hawaii | 2–2 | | | |
| 1910 | Hawaii | 4–2 | | | |
| 1911 | Hawaii | 2–2 | | | |
| Hawaii: | | 8–6 | | | |
| Total: | | 8–6 | | | |
