= James Gayle (American football coach) =

American football coach

Biographical details
- Education: Hampton University (1916)

Coaching career (HC unless noted)
- 1917–1921: Tuskegee

Head coaching record
- Overall: 22–6–2

James Gayle was the sixth head football coach at Tuskegee University in Tuskegee, Alabama and he held that position for five seasons, from 1917 to 1921. His coaching record at Tuskegee was 22–6–2.
