= 1910 Hawaii Fighting Deans football team =

American college football season

1910 Hawaii Fighting Deans football
- Conference: Independent
- Record: 4–2
- Head coach: Austin Jones (2nd season)

1910 Western college football independents records
	Conf.			Overall
Team	W	L	T	W		L		T
USC		–		7	–	0	–	1
Utah Agricultural		–		5	–	2	–	0
Hawaii		–		4	–	2	–	0
Montana		–		3	–	2	–	1
New Mexico A&M		–		3	–	2	–	0
Wyoming		–		4	–	4	–	0
Montana Agricultural		–		2	–	3	–	2
New Mexico		–		0	–	3	–	0

The 1910 Hawaii Fighting Deans football team represented the College of Agriculture and Mechanic Arts of the Territory of Hawaiʻi—now known as the University of Hawaiʻi at Mānoa–as an independent during the 1910 college football season. In their second season under head coach Austin Jones, the Fighting Deans compiled a 4–2 record.

== Schedule ==
Date	Time	Opponent	Site	Result	Source
October 29		McKinley High School	Honolulu, Territory of Hawaii	W 16–0	
November 5		at McKinley High School	Boy's Field; Honolulu, Territory of Hawaii	W 24–0	
November 12		at McKinley High School	Boy's Field; Honolulu, Territory of Hawaii	W 36–0	
November 19		at Oahu College	Alexander Field; Honolulu, Territory of Hawaii	W 3–2	
November 24		Oahu College	Honolulu, Territory of Hawaii	L 0–9	
December 3	3:30 p.m.	at Oahu College	Alexander Field; Honolulu, Territory of Hawaii	L 0–5	
