= Colorado College Tigers football =

Football team representing Colorado College

Colorado College Tigers
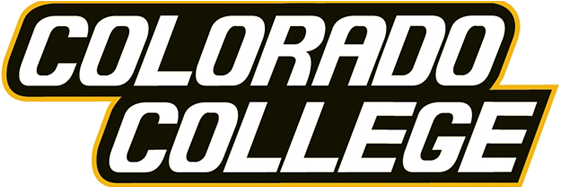
- First season: 1882; 144 years ago
- Last season: 2008; 18 years ago
- Location: Colorado Springs, CO
- Stadium: Washburn Field
- Colors: Black and gold

Conference championships
- 8

The Colorado College Tigers football team represented Colorado College. The team was discontinued in 2008. It last competed at the NCAA Division III level.

== History ==
The team first competed on Christmas Day, 1882. The 1910 team went undefeated. In 1928, Dutch Clark was the first All-American from Colorado.

== Championships ==
=== Conference championships ===
Season	Conf.	Coach	Overall	Conf. results
1910	RMAC	Claude Rothgeb	7–0	4–0
1919†	RMAC	Poss Parsons	4-2-1	3-1-1
1940	RMAC		2-0-1	
1941	RMAC		4-0-0	
1945	RMAC		1-0-0	
1949	RMAC		3-0-0	
1950	RMAC		5-0-0	
1958	RMAC			

† Co-champions

== Playoffs ==
=== NCAA Division III ===
The Tigers made one appearance in the NCAA Division III football playoffs, losing in the quarterfinals.

Year	Round	Opponent	Result
1975	Quarterfinals	Millsaps	L, 21–28
