= 1909 Western Conference football season =

- Sport: Football
- Champion: Minnesota

Football seasons
- 1908 1910

1909 Western Conference football standings
	Conf.					Overall
Team	W		L		T	W		L		T
Minnesota $	3	–	0	–	0	6	–	1	–	0
Chicago	4	–	1	–	1	4	–	1	–	2
Illinois	3	–	1	–	0	5	–	2	–	0
Wisconsin	2	–	1	–	1	3	–	1	–	1
Indiana	1	–	3	–	0	4	–	3	–	0
Northwestern	1	–	3	–	0	1	–	3	–	1
Iowa	0	–	1	–	0	2	–	4	–	1
Purdue	0	–	4	–	0	2	–	5	–	0
$ – Conference champion

The 1909 Western Conference football season was the fourteenth season of college football played by the member schools of the Western Conference (later known as the Big Ten Conference) and was a part of the 1909 college football season.

== Season overview ==
Minnesota was declared the Western Conference champion with an undefeated league record of 3–0, going 6–1 overall. Their only loss was to former conference-mate Michigan, in the first-ever game played for the Little Brown Jug.

After finishing the last two seasons as conference champion, Chicago came in second at 4-1-2 (4-1-1 in league play). Illinois was third at 5-2 (3–1) and Wisconsin fourth with an overall record of 3-1-1 (2–1–1), which rounded out the schools with league records over .500.

Indiana wound up at 4–3, but went 1–3 in conference play; tying Northwestern, who finished overall at 1–3–1.

Iowa and Purdue went winless on the year, but both managed to secure two non-conference victories.

=== Minnesota ===
Date	Time	Opponent	Site	Result	Attendance	Source
September 25		Lawrence*	Northrop Field; Minneapolis, MN	W 25–0	3,000	
October 2		Iowa	Northrop Field; Minneapolis, MN (rivalry)	W 41–0	6,000	
October 9		Iowa State*	Northrop Field; Minneapolis, MN	W 18–0	2,000	
October 16		vs. Nebraska*	Omaha, NE (rivalry)	W 14–0	7,000	
October 30		Chicago	Northrop Field; Minneapolis, MN	W 20–6	26,000	
November 13		at Wisconsin	Randall Field; Madison, WI (rivalry)	W 34–6	7,500	
November 20	1:01 p.m.	Michigan*	Northrop Field; Minneapolis, MN (Little Brown Jug)	L 6–15	22,000–25,000	
*Non-conference game; All times are in Central time

=== Chicago ===
Date	Opponent	Site	Result	Attendance	Source
October 2	Purdue	Marshall Field; Chicago, IL (rivalry)	W 40–0		
October 9	Indiana	Marshall Field; Chicago, IL	W 21–0		
October 16	Illinois	Marshall Field; Chicago, IL	W 14–8		
October 30	at Minnesota	Northrop Field; Minneapolis, MN	L 6–20	26,000	
November 6	Northwestern	Marshall Field; Chicago, IL	W 34–0		
November 13	at Cornell*	Percy Field; Ithaca, NY	T 6–6		
November 20	Wisconsin	Marshall Field; Chicago, IL	T 6–6		
*Non-conference game

=== Illinois ===
Date	Time	Opponent	Site	Result	Attendance	Source
October 2		Millikin*	Illinois Field; Champaign, IL	W 23–0		
October 9		Kentucky State College*	Illinois Field; Champaign, IL	L 2–6		
October 16		at Chicago	Marshall Field; Chicago, IL	L 8–14		
October 30		Purdue	Illinois Field; Champaign, IL(rivalry)	W 24–6		
November 6		Indiana	Illinois Field; Champaign, IL (rivalry)	W 6–5		
November 13		at Northwestern	Northwestern Field; Evanston, IL (rivalry)	W 35–0		
November 20	2:15 p.m.	at Syracuse*	Archbold Stadium; Syracuse, NY	W 17–8	7,000	
*Non-conference game

=== Wisconsin ===
Date	Opponent	Site	Result	Attendance
October 9	Lawrence*	Randall Field; Madison, WI	W 22–0	
October 23	Indiana	Randall Field; Madison, WI	W 6–3	
October 30	at Northwestern	Northwestern Field; Evanston, IL	W 21–11	
November 13	Minnesota^{†}	Randall Field; Madison, WI (rivalry)	L 6–34	7,500
November 20	at Chicago	Marshall Field; Chicago, IL	T 6–6	
*Non-conference game; ^{†}Homecoming

=== Indiana ===
Date	Time	Opponent	Site	Result	Attendance	Source
October 2		DePauw*	Jordan Field; Bloomington, IN	W 28–5		
October 9		at Chicago	Marshall Field; Chicago, IL	L 0–21		
October 16		Lake Forest*	Jordan Field; Bloomington, IN	W 27–5		
October 23		at Wisconsin	Randall Field; Madison, WI	L 3–6		
October 30	4:00 p.m.	at Saint Louis*	League Park; St. Louis, MO	W 30–0	4,000	
November 6		at Illinois	Illinois Field; Champaign, IL (rivalry)	L 5–6		
November 20		Purdue	Bloomington, IN (rivalry)	W 36–3		
*Non-conference game; All times are in Eastern time

=== Northwestern ===
Date	Opponent	Site	Result
October 2	Illinois Wesleyan*	Northwestern Field; Evanston, IL	T 0–0
October 9	at Purdue	Stuart Field; West Lafayette, IN	W 14–5
October 30	Wisconsin	Northwestern Field; Evanston, IL	L 11–21
November 6	at Chicago	Marshall Field; Chicago, IL	L 0–34
November 13	Illinois	Northwestern Field; Evanston, IL (rivalry)	L 0–35
*Non-conference game

=== Iowa ===
Date	Opponent	Site	Result	Attendance	Source
October 2	at Minnesota	Northrop Field; Minneapolis, MN (rivalry)	L 0–41	6,000	
October 9	Cornell (IA)*	Iowa Field; Iowa City, IA	W 3–0		
October 23	at Nebraska	Nebraska Field; Lincoln, NE (rivalry)	T 6–6		
October 30	Missouri	Iowa Field; Iowa City, IA	L 12–13		
November 6	at Drake	Haskins Field; Des Moines, IA	L 14–17	5,000	
November 13	Iowa State	Iowa Field; Iowa City, IA (rivalry)	W 16–0		
November 20	at Kansas	McCook Field; Lawrence, KS	L 7–20		
*Non-conference game

=== Purdue ===
Date	Opponent	Site	Result	Attendance	Source
October 2	at Chicago	Stagg Field; Chicago, IL (rivalry)	L 0–40		
October 9	Northwestern	Stuart Field; West Lafayette, IN	L 5–14		
October 16	DePauw*	Stuart Field; West Lafayette, IN	W 15–12		
October 30	at Illinois	Illinois Field; Champaign, IL (rivalry)	L 6–24		
November 6	Wabash*	Stuart Field; West Lafayette, IN	L 17–18		
November 13	Rose Polytechnic*	Stuart Field; West Lafayette, IN	W 26–3		
November 20	at Indiana	Jordan Field; Bloomington, IN (Old Oaken Bucket)	L 3–36		
*Non-conference game

=== Bowl games ===
No Western Conference schools participated in any bowl games during the 1909 season.

== All-American honors ==
=== Ends ===
- Harlan Page, Chicago (WC-3)

=== Tackles ===
- James Walker, Minnesota (TC-1)

=== Centers ===
- H. E. Farnum, Minnesota (WC-3)

=== Quarterbacks ===
- **John McGovern**, Minnesota (College Football Hall of Fame) (WC-1; TC-1)
- Harlan Page, Chicago (NYT-2)

=== Key ===
NCAA recognized selectors for 1909

- WC = Collier's Weekly as selected by Walter Camp

Other selectors

- NYT = The New York Times
- TC = Tommy Clark, noted sports writer whose work appeared in several papers
- UP = United Press consensus All-American team, based on selections from 22 of "the best football experts." The numbers shown in parentheses reflect the number of voters (out of the total of 22) who selected the person as a first-team All-American.
- AC = The Atlanta Constitution based on aggregating the All-America selections of ten leading Eastern newspapers. The numbers shown in parentheses reflect the number of voters (out of the total of 10) who selected the person as a first-team All-American.

Bold = Consensus All-American

- 1 – First-team selection
- 2 – Second-team selection
- 3 – Third-team selection

== All-Western selections ==
- Harlan Page, End, Chicago (ECP-1, WE)
- James Dean, End, Wisconsin (ECP-2, WE)
- Walter Henry Rademacher, End, Minnesota (ECP-1)
- James Walker, Tackle, Minnesota (ECP-1, WE)
- F. E. Boyle, Tackle, Wisconsin (ECP-2)
- Homer W. Dutter, Tackle, Indiana (ECP-2)
- Glenn D. Butzer, Guard, Illinois (ECP-2)
- Harry W. Powers, Guard, Minnesota (ECP-2)
- Henry E. Farnum, Center, Minnesota (ECP-1)
- John McGovern, Quarterback, Minnesota (ECP-1, WE) (CFHOF)
- Otto E. Seiler, Quarterback, Illinois (ECP-2)
- William Lucas Crawley, Halfback, Chicago (ECP-2)
- Earle T. Pickering, Fullback, Minnesota (ECP-1)
- John Wilce, Fullback, Wisconsin (ECP-2) (CFHOF)
