= Haskell Indian Nations Fighting Indians football =

Football team of the Haskell Indian Nations University

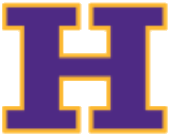
- First season: 1896 (Note: Had two revivals in 1946 and 1963.)
- Last season: 2015 (Note: The program had been previously closed in 1938, and 1947.)
- Stadium: Haskell Memorial Stadium
- Location: Lawrence, Kansas
- Colors: Purple and gold

The Haskell Fighting Indians football team represented the Haskell Institute, later known as Haskell Indian Nations University, in college football. They fielded their first football team in 1895.

From the late 19th century and continuing through the early 1930s, Haskell's football program regularly scheduled games against regional and national powers and became known as the "Powerhouse of the West". (Note: Haskell's opponents during these years included Texas (1902-1907, 1909-1910, 1912, 1914, 1919), Nebraska (1901-1904, 1908-1910, 1913, 1921), Texas A&M (1906-1909, 1913-1916), Kansas (1896-1899, 1901-1904, 1930-1931), Missouri (1899-1905), Kansas State (1906-1907, 1910, 1912, 1919), Minnesota (1901, 1923-1924, 1928), Oklahoma State (1915-1916, 1919, 1930-1931), Illinois (1902, 1915-1916), Chicago (1903, 1915-1916), Boston College (1924-1926), Notre Dame (1914-1916, 1932), Denver (1903, 1909, 1912), Baylor (1909-1910, 1922), Arkansas (1907-1908), Oklahoma (1905, 1914), LSU (1908, 1914), Alabama (1908), Colorado (1905), Purdue (1898), Wisconsin (1916), Michigan State (1926), West Virginia (1928), Texas Tech (1931), and Carlisle (1904).)

== History ==
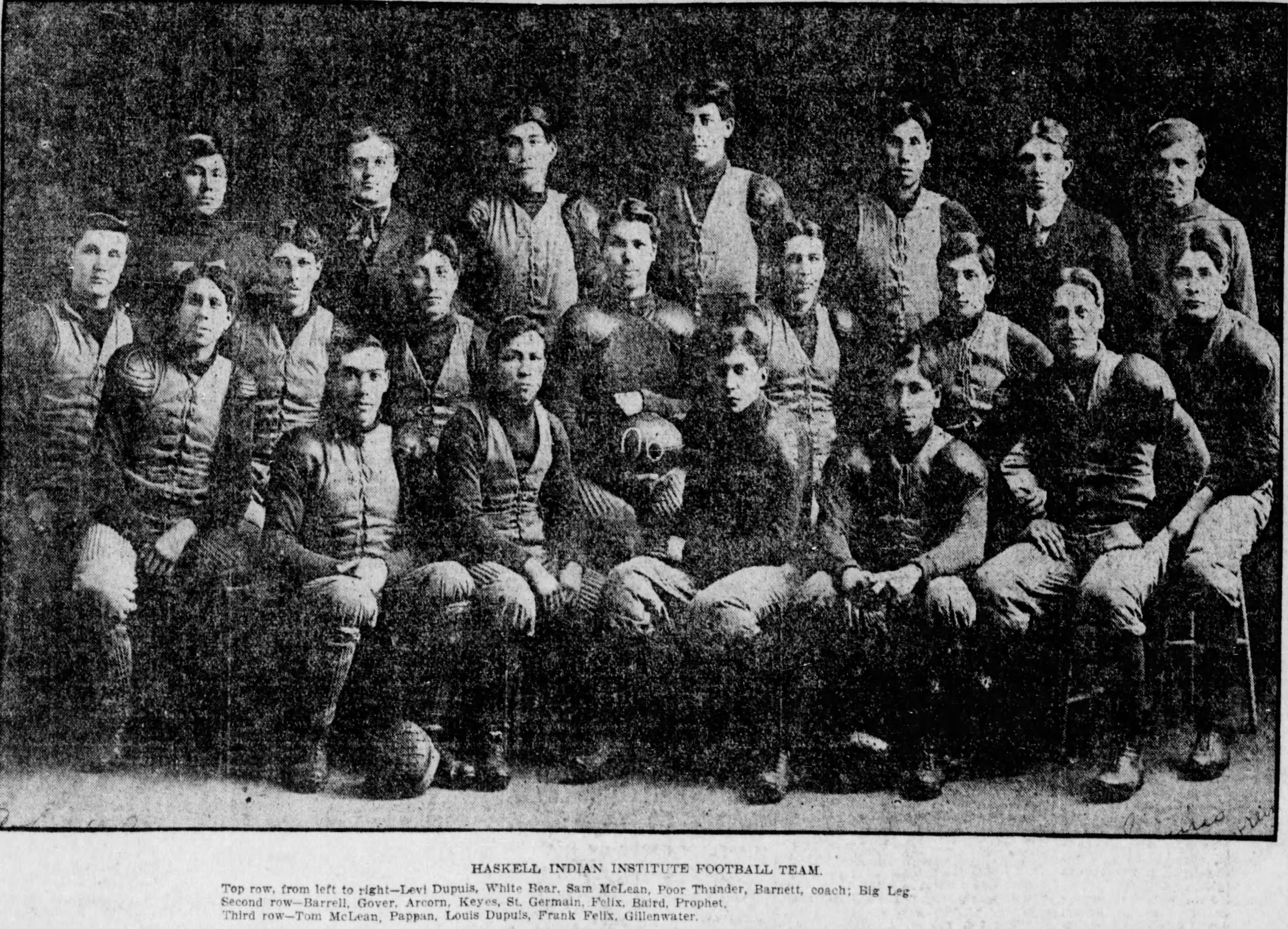
1906 Haskell team

The program had its earliest success in the early 1900s with a combined record of 38–8–1 from 1900 to 1904. The 1909 team compiled a 7–2 record including victories over Texas and Nebraska.

The team experienced further success under head coach A. R. Kennedy from 1911 to 1915. His 1913 team compiled a 10–1 record, including a 28–0 victory over Texas A&M. After Kennedy departed, the success continued as the 1919 team compiled an 8–1–1 record, including victories over Oklahoma A&M and Kansas State.

The program reached its peak of prominence during the tenure of head coach Dick Hanley from 1922 to 1926. Hanley's teams compiled a 47–9–4 record, including an undefeated season for the 1926 team. Prominent players on Hanley's teams included backs John Levi and Mayes McLain. Levi was selected as a first-team All-American in 1923, and McLain set all-time college football scoring records in 1926 with 38 rushing touchdowns, 253 points scored, and a scoring average of 23 points per game.

The program also enjoyed success under head coach William Henry Dietz. Dietz' teams compiled records of 6–2 in 1929 and 9–1 in 1930. Louis Weller starred at halfback during these years.

In the early 1930s, the Bureau of Indian Affairs eliminated junior college courses and reduced the school's emphasis on intercollegiate athletics. After the 1938 season, Haskell dropped intercollegiate football altogether until 1946, when the program was revived, with the schedule mostly consisting of military academys, forts, and junior colleges. After 1947, Haskell once again dropped intercollegiate football.

The program was again dropped in 2015 due to funding shortfalls.
