= 1909 Washington University football team =

American college football season

1909 Washington University football
- Conference: Missouri Valley Conference
- Record: 3–4 (0–2 MVC)
- Head coach: Frank Cayou (2nd season)
- Captain: Hack Hagin
- Home stadium: Francis Field

1909 Missouri Valley Conference football standings
	Conf.					Overall
Team	W		L		T	W		L		T
Missouri $	4	–	0	–	1	7	–	0	–	1
Kansas	3	–	1	–	0	8	–	1	–	0
Drake	2	–	1	–	0	6	–	1	–	0
Iowa	1	–	3	–	1	2	–	4	–	1
Iowa State	0	–	2	–	1	4	–	3	–	1
Nebraska	0	–	1	–	0	3	–	3	–	2
Washington University	0	–	2	–	0	3	–	4	–	0
$ – Conference champion

The 1909 Washington University Pikers football team represented Washington University in St. Louis as a member of the Missouri Valley Conference (MVC) during the 1909 college football season. Led by second-year head coach Frank Cayou, the team compiled an overall record of 3–4 with a mark of 0–2 in conference play, placing last out of seven teams in the MVC. Washington University played home games at Francis Field in St. Louis. Hack Hagin was elected team captain prior to Washington University's first game of the season, against Shurtleff.

== Schedule ==
Date	Time	Opponent	Site	Result	Attendance	Source
October 9		Shurtleff*	Francis Field; St. Louis, MO	W 12–6		
October 16		Millikin*	Francis Field; St. Louis, MO	W 29–5		
October 23		at Kansas	McCook Field; Lawrence, KS	L 0–23		
October 30	3:00 p.m.	Knox*	Francis Field; St. Louis, MO	W 11–2		
November 6	2:30 p.m.	Missouri	Francis Field; St. Louis, MO	L 0–5	7,000	
November 20	2:30 p.m.	Vanderbilt*	Francis Field; St. Louis, MO	L 0–12	5,000	
November 25	2:30 p.m.	at Arkansas*	West End Park; Little Rock, AR	L 0–34	5,000	
*Non-conference game
