= 1909 Kansas Jayhawks football team =

American college football season

1909 Kansas Jayhawks football
- Conference: Missouri Valley Conference
- Record: 8–1 (3–1 MVC)
- Head coach: A. R. Kennedy (6th season)
- Captain: Carl Pleasant
- Home stadium: McCook Field

1909 Missouri Valley Conference football standings
	Conf.					Overall
Team	W		L		T	W		L		T
Missouri $	4	–	0	–	1	7	–	0	–	1
Kansas	3	–	1	–	0	8	–	1	–	0
Drake	2	–	1	–	0	6	–	1	–	0
Iowa	1	–	3	–	1	2	–	4	–	1
Iowa State	0	–	2	–	1	4	–	3	–	1
Nebraska	0	–	1	–	0	3	–	3	–	2
Washington University	0	–	2	–	0	3	–	4	–	0
$ – Conference champion

The 1909 Kansas Jayhawks football team was an American football team that represented the University of Kansas as a member of the Missouri Valley Conference (MVC) during the 1909 college football season. In their sixth season under head coach A. R. Kennedy, the Jayhawks compiled an 8–1 record (3–1 against conference opponents), finished in second place in the conference, and outscored opponents by a total of 172 to 22. The Jayhawks played their home games at McCook Field in Lawrence, Kansas. Carl Pleasant was the team captain.

== Schedule ==
Date	Time	Opponent	Site	Result	Attendance	Source
September 25		Kansas State Normal*	McCook Field; Lawrence, KS	W 54–0		
October 2		St. Mary's (KS)*	McCook Field; Lawrence, KS	W 29–0		
October 9		Oklahoma*	McCook Field; Lawrence, KS	W 11–0	1,200	
October 16		at Kansas State*	Manhattan, KS (rivalry)	W 5–3	3,500	
October 23		Washington University	McCook Field; Lawrence, KS	W 23–0		
October 30		at Washburn*	Topeka, KS	W 17–0		
November 6		at Nebraska	Nebraska Field; Lincoln, NE (rivalry)	W 6–0		
November 20		Iowa	McCook Field; Lawrence, KS	W 20–7		
November 25	2:00 p.m.	vs. Missouri	Association Park; Kansas City, MO (rivalry)	L 6–12	15,000	
*Non-conference game
