= A. R. Kennedy =

American football player and coach (1876–1969)

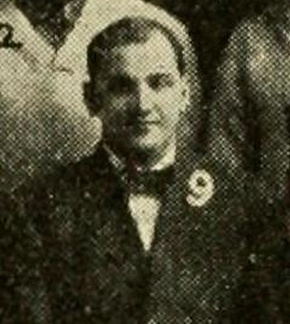
- Kennedy pictured, c. 1908, with the Kansas football team

Biographical details
- Born: October 24, 1876; Douglas County, Kansas, U.S.
- Died: June 29, 1969 (aged 92); Lawrence, Kansas, U.S.

Playing career
- 1895–1897: Kansas
- 1899: Penn
- 1900: Latrobe Athletic Association
- 1901: Philadelphia Pros
- 1902: Philadelphia Phillies
- 1902: New York
- Position: Quarterback

Coaching career (HC unless noted)
- 1903: Washburn
- 1904–1910: Kansas
- 1911–1915: Haskell
- 1916–1917: Washburn

Administrative career (AD unless noted)
- 1916–1919: Washburn

Head coaching record
- Overall: 95–36–10

Accomplishments and honors

Championships
- 1 MVIAA (1908)

Albert Rutherford Kennedy (October 24, 1876 – September 5, 1969) was an American college football player and coach. He played football at both the University of Kansas for three seasons, from 1895 to 1897, including one as team captain, and at the University of Pennsylvania, for one season in 1899. Kennedy also played three years of professional football immediately after graduating from Penn. During this time he played in the first professional football game ever played in Madison Square Garden which was also the first indoor professional football game ever played. After his last year of playing professionally, he returned to his home state of Kansas and coached football at Washburn University (1903, 1916–1917), at the University of Kansas (1904–1910), and at the Haskell Institute—now known as Haskell Indian Nations University (1911–1915), compiling a career record of 95–36–10. His 52 wins with the Kansas Jayhawks football team are the most in the program's history. He remains, as of 2026, the last coach to lead the Jayhawks to a perfect season.

== Early life ==
Kennedy was born on the family farm in rural Wakarusa Township, just outside Lawrence, Kansas, to Leander Jack Kennedy (September 21, 1836 – June 29, 1903) and Amanda E. Kennedy (née Todd) (November 23, 1841 – March 4, 1926).

== Professional football career ==
Kennedy's professional football career spanned three seasons. In 1900, he served as quarterback and co-coach for the Latrobe Athletic Association. He moved to the Philadelphia Pros in 1901, and in the following year captained the Philadelphia Phillies of the first National Football League. After the NFL season concluded in late 1902, he became manager and captain of a "New York" team that competed in the World Series of Football.

== College coaching career ==
=== Washburn ===
Kennedy was the eighth and then the fifteenth head football coach for Washburn University in Topeka, Kansas and he held that position for the 1903 season, and then returned for the 1916 and 1917 seasons. His overall coaching record at Washburn was 12 wins, 12 losses, and 3 ties. Kennedy also served as the athletic director from 1916 to 1919.

=== Kansas ===
Kennedy was the 11th head football coach for the University of Kansas Jayhawks located in Lawrence, Kansas and he held that position for seven seasons, from 1904 until 1910. His overall coaching record at Kansas was 52 wins, 9 losses, and 4 ties. This ranks him first at Kansas in terms of total wins and second at Kansas in terms of winning percentage.

Kennedy is one of the best performing coaches for Kansas in the Border War (as of 2007 called "Border Showdown") between Kansas and Missouri going 4-1-2 (.714) against them as a coach and 7-1-2 (.800) against them cumulatively as a coach and player.

=== Haskell ===
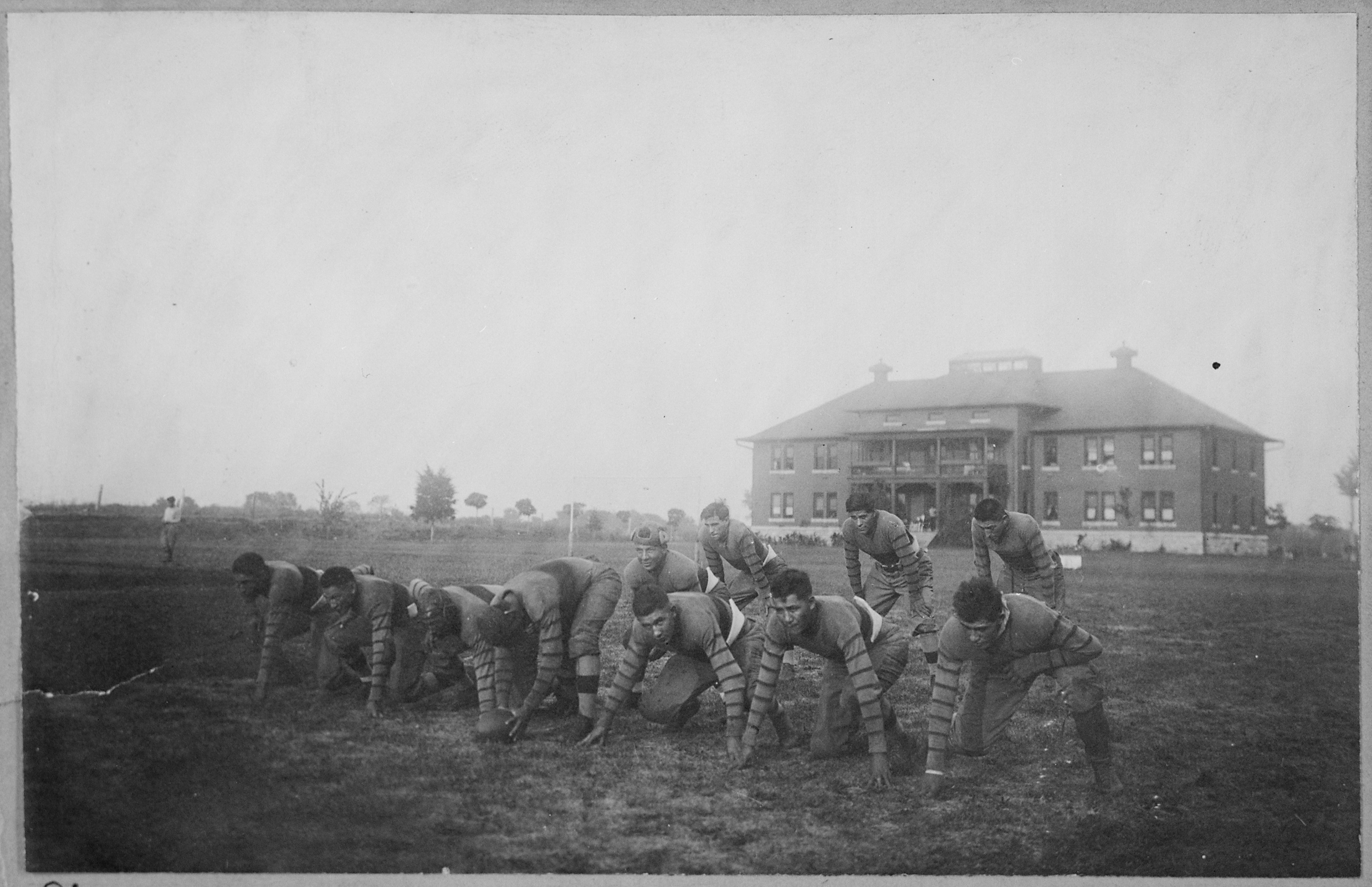
1914 Haskell football team

Kennedy was the head coach of the Haskell Indian Nations Fighting Indians football team from 1911 until 1916. At Haskell, his teams managed 32 wins, 22 losses, and 3 ties.

== Later life, death, and legacy ==
Aside from coaching, Kennedy practiced dentistry for 62 years, even while coaching, until he was 89. He was also briefly the director of athletics for the Manhattan, Kansas YMCA.

He and his wife, Mary Theressa Kennedy (née Kennard), had four children. His youngest son, Ted Kennedy (October 18, 1912 - January 19. 2013), was a two time mayor of Lawrence, Kansas and lifelong dentist in Lawrence, Kansas. He also played a major part in the building of Lake Clinton. His second youngest son, Jesse Kennard "Bud" Kennedy (April 22, 1907 – June 24, 1966) was the head men's basketball coach at Florida State University from 1948 until his untimely death in 1966. Kennedy died on September 5, 1969, at the age of 92. He was survived by his 2nd wife, Harriet H. Kennedy (January 27, 1893 – December 19, 1969), daughters, Mrs. Ruth King, Mrs. Theressa Jane Van Hoy and sons Leander Jack Kennedy and Ted Kennedy. Kennedy was laid to rest in Memorial Park Cemetery in Lawrence, Kansas.

== Head coaching record ==
| Year | Team | Overall | Conference | Standing | Bowl/playoffs |
|---|---|---|---|---|---|
Washburn Ichabods (Kansas College Athletic Conference) (1903)
| 1903 | Washburn | 7–0–1 | | | |
Kansas Jayhawks (Independent) (1904–1906)
| 1904 | Kansas | 8–1–1 | | | |
| 1905 | Kansas | 10–1 | | | |
| 1906 | Kansas | 6–2–2 | | | |
Kansas Jayhawks (Missouri Valley Intercollegiate Athletic Association) (1907–1910)
| 1907 | Kansas | 5–3 | 1–1 | 3rd | |
| 1908 | Kansas | 9–0 | 4–0 | 1st | |
| 1909 | Kansas | 8–1 | 3–1 | 2nd | |
| 1910 | Kansas | 6–1–1 | 1–1–1 | 5th | |
| Kansas: | | 52–9–4 | 9–3–1 | | |
Haskell Indians (Independent) (1911–1915)
| 1911 | Haskell | 4–2–3 | | | |
| 1912 | Haskell | 7–4 | | | |
| 1913 | Haskell | 10–1 | | | |
| 1914 | Haskell | 5–4 | | | |
| 1915 | Haskell | 5–5 | | | |
| Haskell: | | 31–16–3 | | | |
Washburn Ichabods (Kansas College Athletic Conference) (1916–1917)
| 1916 | Washburn | 3–6 | 3–4 | 9th | |
| 1917 | Washburn | 2–6–2 | 2–5–2 | T–11th | |
| Washburn: | | 12–12–3 | | | |
| Total: | | 95–36–10 | | | |

== See also ==
- List of college football head coaches with non-consecutive tenure
