= 1909 Missouri Tigers football team =

American college football season

1909 Missouri Tigers football

MVC champion
- Conference: Missouri Valley Conference
- Record: 7–0–1 (.938) (4–0–1 (.900) MVC)
- Head coach: Bill Roper (1st season)
- Captain: Carl L. Ristine
- Home stadium: Rollins Field

1909 Missouri Valley Conference football standings
| | Conf. | | | | | Overall |
| Team | W | | L | | T | W | | L | | T |
|---|---|---|---|---|---|---|---|---|---|---|
| Missouri $ | 4 | – | 0 | – | 1 | 7 | – | 0 | – | 1 |
| Kansas | 3 | – | 1 | – | 0 | 8 | – | 1 | – | 0 |
| Drake | 2 | – | 1 | – | 0 | 6 | – | 1 | – | 0 |
| Iowa | 1 | – | 3 | – | 1 | 2 | – | 4 | – | 1 |
| Iowa State | 0 | – | 2 | – | 1 | 4 | – | 3 | – | 1 |
| Nebraska | 0 | – | 1 | – | 0 | 3 | – | 3 | – | 2 |
| Washington University | 0 | – | 2 | – | 0 | 3 | – | 4 | – | 0 |
$ – Conference champion

The 1909 Missouri Tigers football team was an American football team that represented the University of Missouri in the Missouri Valley Conference (MVC) during the 1909 college football season. The team compiled a 7–0–1 record (4–0–1 against MVC opponents) and outscored all opponents by a combined total of 86 to 36. Bill Roper was the head coach for the first and only season. The team played its home games at Rollins Field in Columbia, Missouri.

The 1909 season is one of two times Missouri has had an undefeated season (the other being 1960), and the Tigers' .938 winning percentage is the second-best in program history, also behind the 1960 team.

== Schedule ==
| Date | Time | Opponent | Site | Result | Attendance | Source |
|---|---|---|---|---|---|---|
| October 1 | | Monmouth (IL)* | Rollins Field; Columbia, MO | W 12–6 | | |
| October 9 | | Kansas State* | Rollins Field; Columbia, MO | W 3–0 | | |
| October 16 | | Missouri Mines* | Rollins Field; Columbia, MO | W 13–0 | | |
| October 23 | | at Iowa State | State Field; Ames, IA (rivalry) | T 6–6 | | |
| October 30 | | at Iowa | Iowa Field; Iowa City, IA | W 13–12 | | |
| November 6 | 2:30 p.m. | at Washington University | Francis Field; St. Louis, MO | W 5–0 | 7,000 | |
| November 13 | | Drake | Rollins Field; Columbia, MO | W 22–6 | | |
| November 25 | 2:00 p.m. | vs. Kansas | Association Park; Kansas City, MO (rivalry) | W 12–6 | | |
*Non-conference game
