= 1910 Kansas State Aggies football team =

American college football season

1910 Kansas State Aggies football

KCAC champion
- Conference: Kansas Collegiate Athletic Conference
- Record: 10–1 ( KCAC)
- Head coach: Mike Ahearn (6th season)

The 1910 Kansas State Aggies football team represented Kansas State Agricultural College (now Kansas State University) in the 1910 college football season. In their sixth and final year under head coach Mike Ahearn, the Aggies compiled a 10–1 record, and outscored their opponents by a combined total of 336 to 28.

This is the only football season between 1902 and present that Kansas State did not face the University of Kansas.

== Schedule ==
Date	Opponent	Site	Result	Source
September 28	William Jewell	Manhattan, KS	W 57–0	
October 1	Haskell	Manhattan, KS	W 39–0	
October 8	at Kansas State Normal	Emporia, KS	W 22–0	
October 15	at Arkansas	The Hill; Fayetteville, AR	W 5–0	
October 17	at Drury	Springfield, MO	W 75–5	
October 22	Missouri Mines	Manhattan, KS	W 23–0	
October 29	at Creighton	Omaha, NE	W 6–2	
November 5	at Colorado College	Colorado Springs, CO	L 8–15	
November 12	Fairmount	Manhattan, KS	W 33–6	
November 18	Baker	Manhattan, KS	W 35–0	
November 24	at Washburn	Manhattan, KS	W 33–0	
