= Mike Ahearn =

American athlete and college athletics administrator

Biographical details
- Born: November 28, 1878; Rotherham, England
- Died: February 5, 1948 (aged 69); Manhattan, Kansas, U.S.

Playing career

Football
- c. 1900: Massachusetts Agricultural

Basketball
- 1902–1904: Massachusetts Agricultural

Baseball
- 1898: Massachusetts Agricultural
- 1901–1904: Massachusetts Agricultural

Coaching career (HC unless noted)

Football
- 1905–1910: Kansas State

Basketball
- 1906–1911: Kansas State

Baseball
- 1904–1910: Kansas State

Administrative career (AD unless noted)
- 1920–1947: Kansas State

Head coaching record
- Overall: 39–12 (football); 28–27 (basketball); 90–35–12 (baseball)

Accomplishments and honors

Championships
- Football: 2 KCAC (1909–1910); Basketball: 1 KCAC (1910); Baseball: 2 KCAC (1907–1908)

Michael Francis Ahearn (November 28, 1878 – February 5, 1948) was an American athlete and college athletics administrator. Ahearn played and coached American football, basketball, and baseball, and was a college professor and athletic director at Kansas State Agricultural College—now known as Kansas State University. He also helped guide the evolution of the rules of modern football, serving ten years on the college football rules committee (1922–1931), initially under Secretary Walter Camp and alongside Amos Alonzo Stagg.

He was selected as a charter member of the Kansas Sports Hall of Fame.

== Career ==
Over the years, Ahearn served Kansas State in a variety of roles that included coach, professor, head of the Department of Physical Education, and director of athletics. He is considered the "Father of Kansas State athletics."

In 1905, he officially became the tenth head football coach at Kansas State, but was the first to hold the position for more than one year. He was coach from 1905 until 1910, compiling a record of 39–12. His 39 wins were the most in the history of Kansas State Wildcats football until Bill Snyder passed him in 1995. His winning percentage of .765 is still the highest of any coach in program history.

Ahearn was also the head basketball coach at Kansas State from 1906 to 1911, tallying a mark of 28–27, and the head baseball coach at the school from 1904 to 1910, amassing a record of 90–35–12.

From 1920 until 1947, Ahearn was the athletic director at Kansas State, during which time the school built Memorial Stadium, the Wildcats home football venue from 1922 until 1967.

== Personal life ==
Ahearn was born on November 28, 1878, in Rotherham, England. He attended Massachusetts Agricultural College, now the University of Massachusetts Amherst, where he lettered in football, basketball, baseball, and ice hockey. Ahearn died on February 5, 1948, in Manhattan, Kansas.

== Legacy ==
Kansas State honored Ahearn's coaching success in 1911 by naming its first on-campus athletic field Ahearn Field. The location is the current site of Memorial Stadium. The school further honored his memory in 1950 with the opening of Ahearn Field House, which used to house the school's volleyball and indoor track and field teams, and was home to the Kansas State basketball teams from 1950 to 1988.

== Head coaching record ==
=== Football ===
Year	Team	Overall	Conference	Standing	Bowl/playoffs
Kansas State Aggies (Kansas Intercollegiate Athletic Association) (1905–1910)
1905	Kansas State	6–2			
1906	Kansas State	5–2			
1907	Kansas State	5–3			
1908	Kansas State	6–2			
1909	Kansas State	7–2		1st	
1910	Kansas State	10–1		1st	
Kansas State:		39–12			
Total:		39–12			
National championship Conference title Conference division title or championship game berth

=== Basketball ===
Record table
Season	Team	Overall	Conference	Standing	Postseason
Kansas State Aggies (Kansas Intercollegiate Athletic Association) (1906–1911)
1906–07	Kansas State	5–6			
1907–08	Kansas State	1–12			
1908–09	Kansas State	6–3			
1909–10	Kansas State	11–3		1st	
1910–11	Kansas State	5–3			
Kansas State:		28–27			
Total:		28–27			
National champion Postseason invitational champion Conference regular season champion Conference regular season and conference tournament champion Division regular season champion Division regular season and conference tournament champion Conference tournament champion
