= William C. "King" Cole =

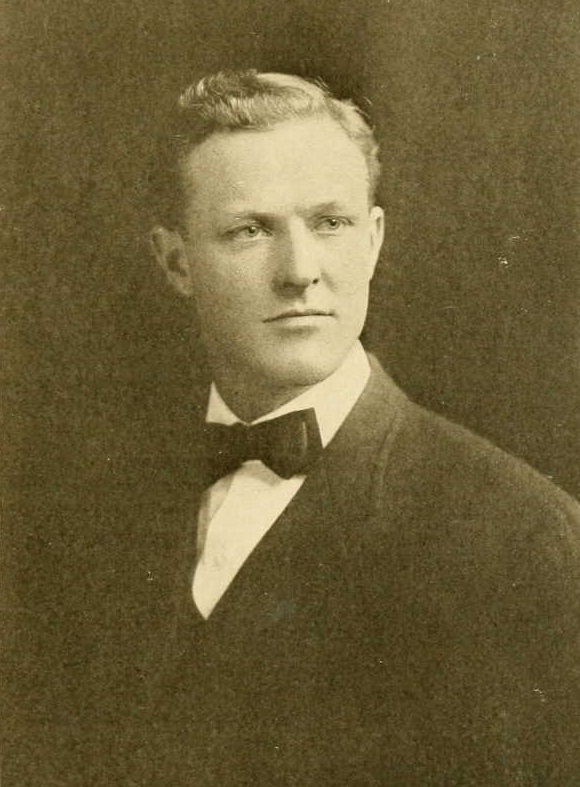
- Cole at Nebraska, c. 1907

Biographical details
- Born: October 7, 1881; Washington County, Ohio, U.S.
- Died: April 23, 1968 (aged 86); Charlottesville, Virginia, U.S.

Playing career

Football
- 1899–1901: Marietta
- 1902: Michigan

Baseball
- 1903: Michigan
- Positions: Tackle, end (football); Center fielder (baseball)

Coaching career (HC unless noted)

Football
- 1903: Marietta
- 1904: Michigan (assistant)
- 1905–1906: Virginia
- 1907–1910: Nebraska
- 1913: Michigan (assistant)

Head coaching record
- Overall: 44–17–5

Accomplishments and honors

Championships
- 2× MVIAA (1907, 1910)

William Cutler "King" Cole (October 7, 1881 – April 23, 1968) was an American college football player and coach. He played as a tackle and end for the undefeated 1902 Michigan Wolverines football team and was assistant coach to Fielding H. Yost on the undefeated 1904 Michigan team. He was also the head football coach at Marietta College (1903), the University of Virginia (1905–1906), and the University of Nebraska (1907–1910). He led the 1907 and 1910 Nebraska teams to conference championships.

== Early years ==
Cole was born on October 7, 1881, in Washington County, Ohio. He attended high school in Charlottesville, Virginia.

== College football player ==
Cole attended Marietta College in Ohio. He played three years for Marietta's football and baseball teams and served as captain of both squads. He played as a back for the football team. He graduated in 1902.

In the fall of 1902, Cole enrolled at the University of Michigan law department. While attending law school, Cole played football as a lineman for Fielding H. Yost's 1902 "Point-a-Minute" football team. The team finished the season 11–0, outscored opponents 644 to 12, and was recognized as a national champion. Cole started three games at left tackle and four games at right end for the 1902 Wolverines. In addition, Cole played as a center fielder on the Michigan baseball team in 1903. Cole received his law degree in 1905.

== Coaching career ==
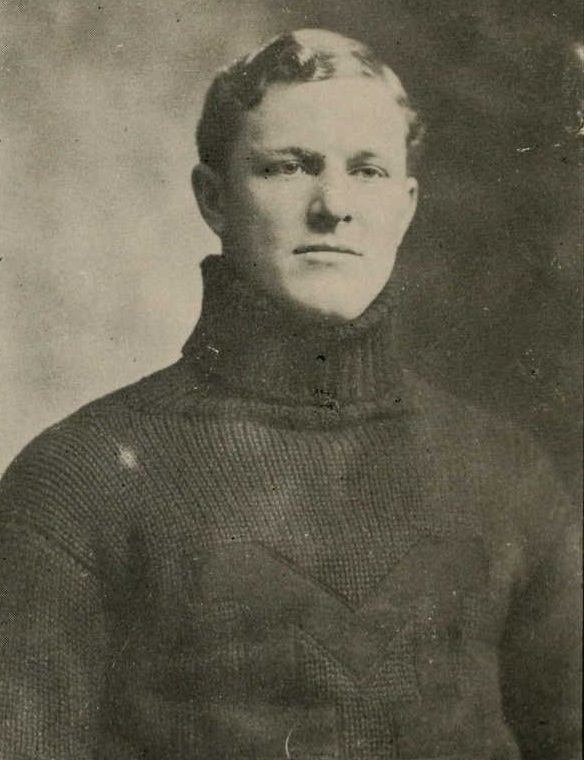
Cole at Michigan

In 1903, Cole took a break from his legal studies to serve as head coach of Marietta's football team. In 1904, he returned to Michigan to complete his legal education and served as an assistant football coach under Yost. As Yost's assistant, Cole helped lead the 1904 Michigan team to another undefeated season.

=== Virginia ===
In January 1905, at age 25, Cole was hired by the University of Virginia as its head football coach, effective upon his graduation from Michigan in the spring. He was hired at a salary of $1,800. At the time of his hiring at Virginia, Michigan's coach Yost said:

There is no better man to be had. He can play anywhere on the team, and his general knowledge of the game on every position makes him just the man for a successful coach. He is an all-round athlete, a man of fine appearance and excellent personality. One of the cleanest and best college men it has been my good fortune to know. In fact, I know of no one whom I could recommend more highly. He is just the type of man needed in American colleges to-day to develop athletes along the right line.

Cole coached the 1905 Virginia Orange and Blue football team to a 5–4 record. After the season, Cole practiced law in Toledo, Ohio. In August 1906, he agreed to return to Virginia for another season as head football coach. His 1906 Virginia football team improved its record to 7–2–2, including a close 18–17 loss to Carlisle.

=== Nebraska ===
In January 1907, Cole was hired by the University of Nebraska as its head football coach. From 1907 to 1910, he coached at Nebraska and compiled a 25–8–3 record. Cole developed many strong players at Nebraska, and his Cornhuskers teams twice won the Missouri Valley Conference championship. In 1911, the Missouri Valley Conference adopted a new rule prohibiting "special coaching" and requiring that coaches must be full-time faculty members. Unwilling to commit to a year-round position, Cole resigned as coach at Nebraska after the 1910 season in which he led Nebraska to a 7–1 record. Cole's last game as Nebraska's head football coach was a 119–0 win over the Haskell Indians, a point total that still ranks as the highest ever by a Cornhuskers team.

Cole's career record as the head coach at Marietta, Virginia, and Nebraska was 44–17–5. In his seven years of head coaching, he never had a losing record.

== Later life ==
While still serving as a coach, Cole practiced law in Toledo, Ohio, in between football seasons. In 1911, Cole left the coaching profession to devote his efforts to the operation of a large ranch of several hundred acres that he owned near Missoula, Montana. Cole died at in Charlottesville in 1968.

== Head coaching record ==
Year	Team	Overall	Conference	Standing	Bowl/playoffs
Marietta Pioneers (Independent) (1903)
1903	Marietta	7–3			
Marietta:		7–3			
Virginia Orange and Blue (Independent) (1905–1906)
1905	Virginia	5–4			
1906	Virginia	7–2–2			
Virginia:		12–6–2			
Nebraska Cornhuskers (Missouri Valley Intercollegiate Athletic Association) (1907–1910)
1907	Nebraska	8–2	1–0	T–1st	
1908	Nebraska	7–2–1	2–1	T–2nd	
1909	Nebraska	3–3–2	0–2–1	T–5th	
1910	Nebraska	7–1	2–0	1st	
Nebraska:		25–8–3	5–3–1		
Total:		44–17–5			
National championship Conference title Conference division title or championship game berth
