= 1909 Indiana Hoosiers football team =

American college football season

1909 Indiana Hoosiers football
- Conference: Western Conference
- Record: 4–3 (1–3 Western)
- Head coach: James M. Sheldon (5th season)
- Captain: Ashel Cunningham
- Home stadium: Jordan Field

1909 Western Conference football standings
	Conf.					Overall
Team	W		L		T	W		L		T
Minnesota $	3	–	0	–	0	6	–	1	–	0
Chicago	4	–	1	–	1	4	–	1	–	2
Illinois	3	–	1	–	0	5	–	2	–	0
Wisconsin	2	–	1	–	1	3	–	1	–	1
Indiana	1	–	3	–	0	4	–	3	–	0
Northwestern	1	–	3	–	0	1	–	3	–	1
Iowa	0	–	1	–	0	2	–	4	–	1
Purdue	0	–	4	–	0	2	–	5	–	0
$ – Conference champion

The 1909 Indiana Hoosiers football team was an American football team that represented Indiana University Bloomington during the 1909 college football season. In their fifth season under head coach James M. Sheldon, the Hoosiers compiled a 4–3 record, finished in a tie for fifth place in the Western Conference, and were outscored by their opponents by a combined total of 129 to 53.

== Schedule ==
Date	Time	Opponent	Site	Result	Attendance	Source
October 2		DePauw*	Jordan Field; Bloomington, IN	W 28–5		
October 9		at Chicago	Marshall Field; Chicago, IL	L 0–21		
October 16		Lake Forest*	Jordan Field; Bloomington, IN	W 27–5		
October 23		at Wisconsin	Randall Field; Madison, WI	L 3–6		
October 30	3:00 p.m.	at Saint Louis*	League Park; St. Louis, MO	W 30–0	4,000	
November 6		at Illinois	Illinois Field; Champaign, IL (rivalry)	L 5–6		
November 20		Purdue	Bloomington, IN (rivalry)	W 36–3		
*Non-conference game
