= 1909 Illinois Fighting Illini football team =

American college football season

1909 Illinois Fighting Illini football
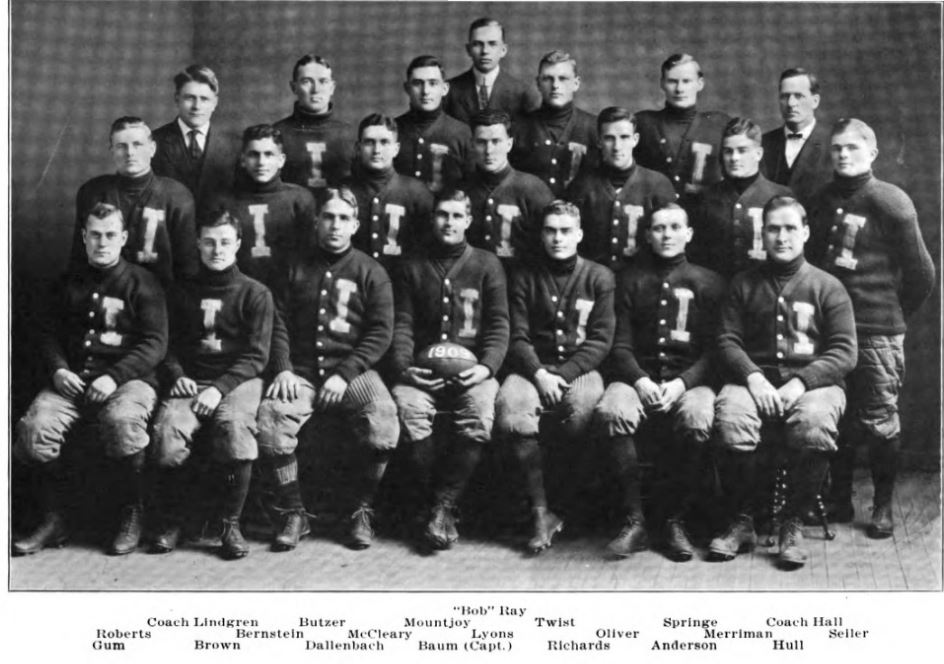
- Conference: Western Conference
- Record: 5–2 (3–1 Western)
- Head coach: Arthur R. Hall (4th season)
- Captain: Benjamin F. Baum
- Home stadium: Illinois Field

1909 Western Conference football standings
	Conf.					Overall
Team	W		L		T	W		L		T
Minnesota $	3	–	0	–	0	6	–	1	–	0
Chicago	4	–	1	–	1	4	–	1	–	2
Illinois	3	–	1	–	0	5	–	2	–	0
Wisconsin	2	–	1	–	1	3	–	1	–	1
Indiana	1	–	3	–	0	4	–	3	–	0
Northwestern	1	–	3	–	0	1	–	3	–	1
Iowa	0	–	1	–	0	2	–	4	–	1
Purdue	0	–	4	–	0	2	–	5	–	0
$ – Conference champion

The 1909 Illinois Fighting Illini football team was an American football team that represented the University of Illinois during the 1909 college football season. In their fourth season under head coach Arthur R. Hall, the Illini compiled a 5–2 record and finished in third place in the Western Conference. End Benjamin F. Baum was the team captain.

== Schedule ==
Date	Time	Opponent	Site	Result	Attendance	Source
October 2		Millikin*	Illinois Field; Champaign, IL	W 23–0		
October 9		Kentucky State College*	Illinois Field; Champaign, IL	L 2–6		
October 16		at Chicago	Marshall Field; Chicago, IL	L 8–14		
October 30		Purdue	Illinois Field; Champaign, IL(rivalry)	W 24–6		
November 6		Indiana	Illinois Field; Champaign, IL (rivalry)	W 6–5		
November 13		at Northwestern	Northwestern Field; Evanston, IL (rivalry)	W 35–0		
November 20	2:15 p.m.	at Syracuse*	Archbold Stadium; Syracuse, NY	W 17–8	7,000	
*Non-conference game
