= 1909 Minnesota Golden Gophers football team =

American college football season

1909 Minnesota Golden Gophers football

Western Conference champion
- Conference: Western Conference
- Record: 6–1 (3–0 Western)
- Head coach: Henry L. Williams (10th season)
- Captain: John McGovern
- Home stadium: Northrop Field

1909 Western Conference football standings
	Conf.					Overall
Team	W		L		T	W		L		T
Minnesota $	3	–	0	–	0	6	–	1	–	0
Chicago	4	–	1	–	1	4	–	1	–	2
Illinois	3	–	1	–	0	5	–	2	–	0
Wisconsin	2	–	1	–	1	3	–	1	–	1
Indiana	1	–	3	–	0	4	–	3	–	0
Northwestern	1	–	3	–	0	1	–	3	–	1
Iowa	0	–	1	–	0	2	–	4	–	1
Purdue	0	–	4	–	0	2	–	5	–	0
$ – Conference champion

The 1909 Minnesota Golden Gophers football team represented the University of Minnesota in the 1909 college football season. In their tenth year under head coach Henry L. Williams, the Golden Gophers compiled a 6–1 record (3–0 against Western Conference opponents), won the conference championship, and outscored their opponents by a combined total of 158 to 27.

== Schedule ==
Date	Time	Opponent	Site	Result	Attendance	Source
September 25		Lawrence*	Northrop Field; Minneapolis, MN	W 25–0	3,000	
October 2		Iowa	Northrop Field; Minneapolis, MN (rivalry)	W 41–0	6,000	
October 9		Iowa State*	Northrop Field; Minneapolis, MN	W 18–0	2,000	
October 16		vs. Nebraska*	Omaha, NE (rivalry)	W 14–0	7,000	
October 30		Chicago	Northrop Field; Minneapolis, MN	W 20–6	26,000	
November 13		at Wisconsin	Randall Field; Madison, WI (rivalry)	W 34–6	7,500	
November 20	1:01 p.m.	Michigan*	Northrop Field; Minneapolis, MN (Little Brown Jug)	L 6–15	22,000–25,000	
*Non-conference game; All times are in Central time
