= 1909 Drake Bulldogs football team =

American college football season

1909 Drake Bulldogs football

Iowa state champion
- Conference: Missouri Valley Conference
- Record: 7–1 (2–1 MVC)
- Head coach: John L. Griffith (2nd season)
- Home stadium: Haskins Field

1909 Missouri Valley Conference football standings
	Conf.					Overall
Team	W		L		T	W		L		T
Missouri $	4	–	0	–	1	7	–	0	–	1
Kansas	3	–	1	–	0	8	–	1	–	0
Drake	2	–	1	–	0	6	–	1	–	0
Iowa	1	–	3	–	1	2	–	4	–	1
Iowa State	0	–	2	–	1	4	–	3	–	1
Nebraska	0	–	1	–	0	3	–	3	–	2
Washington University	0	–	2	–	0	3	–	4	–	0
$ – Conference champion

The 1909 Drake Bulldogs football team was an American football team that represented Drake University in the Missouri Valley Conference (MVC) during the 1909 college football season. In its second season under head coach John L. Griffith, the team compiled a 7–1 record (2–1 against MVC opponents), finished in third place in the conference, shut out six of eight opponents, and outscored all opponents by a total of 138 to 36.

With victories over every Iowa opponent, including Iowa, Iowa State, and Grinnell, Drake was recognized as the Iowa state champion. It was the first championship in the school's history. The team's only setback was against undefeated conference champion Missouri.

Center Bart Warren was the team captain. Fullback Purdy was the team's leading scorer, but sustained an injury against Iowa.

The team played its home games at Haskins Field.

== Schedule ==
Date	Opponent	Site	Result	Attendance	Source
October 2	Des Moines*	Haskins Field; Des Moines, IA	W 9–0		
October 9	Drake alumni*	Haskins Field; Des Moines, IA	W 12–0		
October 16	Coe*	Haskins Field; Des Moines, IA	W 35–0		
October 23	Simpson*	Haskins Field; Des Moines, IA	W 16–0		
October 30	Grinnell*	Haskins Field; Des Moines, IA	W 32–0		
November 6	Iowa	Haskins Field; Des Moines, IA	W 17–14	5,000	
November 13	at Missouri	Rollins Field; Columbia MO	L 6–22		
November 25	Iowa State	Haskins Field; Des Moines, IA	W 11–0		
*Non-conference game
