= 1909 Wisconsin Badgers football team =

American college football season

1909 Wisconsin Badgers football
- Conference: Western Conference
- Record: 3–1–1 (2–1–1 Western)
- Head coach: Thomas A. Barry (2nd season)
- Captain: John Wilce
- Home stadium: Randall Field

1909 Western Conference football standings
	Conf.					Overall
Team	W		L		T	W		L		T
Minnesota $	3	–	0	–	0	6	–	1	–	0
Chicago	4	–	1	–	1	4	–	1	–	2
Illinois	3	–	1	–	0	5	–	2	–	0
Wisconsin	2	–	1	–	1	3	–	1	–	1
Indiana	1	–	3	–	0	4	–	3	–	0
Northwestern	1	–	3	–	0	1	–	3	–	1
Iowa	0	–	1	–	0	2	–	4	–	1
Purdue	0	–	4	–	0	2	–	5	–	0
$ – Conference champion

The 1909 Wisconsin Badgers football team represented the University of Wisconsin as a member of the Western Conference during the 1909 college football season. Led by second-year head coach Thomas A. Barry, the Badgers compiled an overall record of 3–1–1 with a mark of 2–1–1 in conference play, placing fourth in the Western Conference. The team's captain was John Wilce.

== Schedule ==
Date	Opponent	Site	Result	Attendance
October 9	Lawrence*	Randall Field; Madison, WI	W 22–0	
October 23	Indiana	Randall Field; Madison, WI	W 6–3	
October 30	at Northwestern	Northwestern Field; Evanston, IL	W 21–11	
November 13	Minnesota^{†}	Randall Field; Madison, WI (rivalry)	L 6–34	7,500
November 20	at Chicago	Marshall Field; Chicago, IL	T 6–6	
*Non-conference game; ^{†}Homecoming
