= 1909 Iowa State Cyclones football team =

American college football season

1909 Iowa State Cyclones football
- Conference: Missouri Valley Conference
- Record: 4–3–1 (0–2–1 MVC)
- Head coach: Clyde Williams (3rd season)
- Captain: W. H. Willmarth
- Home stadium: State Field

1909 Missouri Valley Conference football standings
	Conf.					Overall
Team	W		L		T	W		L		T
Missouri $	4	–	0	–	1	7	–	0	–	1
Kansas	3	–	1	–	0	8	–	1	–	0
Drake	2	–	1	–	0	6	–	1	–	0
Iowa	1	–	3	–	1	2	–	4	–	1
Iowa State	0	–	2	–	1	4	–	3	–	1
Nebraska	0	–	1	–	0	3	–	3	–	2
Washington University	0	–	2	–	0	3	–	4	–	0
$ – Conference champion

The 1909 Iowa State Cyclones football team represented Iowa State College of Agricultural and Mechanic Arts (later renamed Iowa State University) in the Missouri Valley Conference during the 1909 college football season. In their third season under head coach Clyde Williams, the Cyclones compiled a 4–4 record (2–2 against conference opponents), tied for fifth place in the conference, and outscored their opponents by a combined total of 82 to 62. W.H. Willmarth was the team captain.

Between 1892 and 1913, the football team played on a field that later became the site of the university's Parks Library. The field was known as State Field; when the new field opened in 1914, it became known as "New State Field".

== Schedule ==
Date	Opponent	Site	Result	Attendance	Source
October 2	Coe*	State Field; Ames, IA	W 11–5		
October 9	at Minnesota*	Northrop Field; Minneapolis, MN	L 0–18	2,000	
October 16	at Grinnell*	Grinnell, IA	W 24–0		
October 23	Missouri	State Field; Ames, IA (rivalry)	T 6–6		
October 30	Des Moines*	State Field; Ames, IA	W 23–0		
November 6	Cornell (IA)*	State Field; Ames, IA	W 18–6		
November 13	at Iowa	Iowa Field; Iowa City, IA (rivalry)	L 0–16		
November 25	at Drake	Haskins Field; Des Moines, IA	L 0–11		
*Non-conference game
