= 1909 Northwestern Purple football team =

American college football season

1909 Northwestern Purple football
- Conference: Western Conference
- Record: 1–3–1 (1–3 Western)
- Head coach: Bill Horr (1st season)
- Captain: Dave August
- Home stadium: Northwestern Field

1909 Western Conference football standings
| | Conf. | | | | | Overall |
| Team | W | | L | | T | W | | L | | T |
|---|---|---|---|---|---|---|---|---|---|---|
| Minnesota $ | 3 | – | 0 | – | 0 | 6 | – | 1 | – | 0 |
| Chicago | 4 | – | 1 | – | 1 | 4 | – | 1 | – | 2 |
| Illinois | 3 | – | 1 | – | 0 | 5 | – | 2 | – | 0 |
| Wisconsin | 2 | – | 1 | – | 1 | 3 | – | 1 | – | 1 |
| Indiana | 1 | – | 3 | – | 0 | 4 | – | 3 | – | 0 |
| Northwestern | 1 | – | 3 | – | 0 | 1 | – | 3 | – | 1 |
| Iowa | 0 | – | 1 | – | 0 | 2 | – | 4 | – | 1 |
| Purdue | 0 | – | 4 | – | 0 | 2 | – | 5 | – | 0 |
$ – Conference champion

The 1909 Northwestern Purple team represented Northwestern University during the 1909 college football season. In their first and only year under head coach Bill Horr, the Purple compiled a 1–3–1 record (1–3 against Western Conference opponents) and finished in sixth place in the Western Conference.

== Schedule ==
| Date | Opponent | Site | Result |
|---|---|---|---|
| October 2 | Illinois Wesleyan* | Northwestern Field; Evanston, IL | T 0–0 |
| October 9 | at Purdue | Stuart Field; West Lafayette, IN | W 14–5 |
| October 30 | Wisconsin | Northwestern Field; Evanston, IL | L 11–21 |
| November 6 | at Chicago | Marshall Field; Chicago, IL | L 0–34 |
| November 13 | Illinois | Northwestern Field; Evanston, IL (rivalry) | L 0–35 |
*Non-conference game
