= 1909 Iowa Hawkeyes football team =

American college football season

1909 Iowa Hawkeyes football
- Conference: Missouri Valley Conference, Western Conference
- Record: 2–4–1 (0–1 MVC, 0–1 Western)
- Head coach: John G. Griffith (1st season)
- Captain: H. R. "Raymond" Gross
- Home stadium: Iowa Field

1909 Missouri Valley Conference football standings
| | Conf. | | | | | Overall |
| Team | W | | L | | T | W | | L | | T |
|---|---|---|---|---|---|---|---|---|---|---|
| Missouri $ | 4 | – | 0 | – | 1 | 7 | – | 0 | – | 1 |
| Kansas | 3 | – | 1 | – | 0 | 8 | – | 1 | – | 0 |
| Drake | 2 | – | 1 | – | 0 | 6 | – | 1 | – | 0 |
| Iowa | 1 | – | 3 | – | 1 | 2 | – | 4 | – | 1 |
| Iowa State | 0 | – | 2 | – | 1 | 4 | – | 3 | – | 1 |
| Nebraska | 0 | – | 1 | – | 0 | 3 | – | 3 | – | 2 |
| Washington University | 0 | – | 2 | – | 0 | 3 | – | 4 | – | 0 |
$ – Conference champion

1909 Western Conference football standings
| | Conf. | | | | | Overall |
| Team | W | | L | | T | W | | L | | T |
|---|---|---|---|---|---|---|---|---|---|---|
| Minnesota $ | 3 | – | 0 | – | 0 | 6 | – | 1 | – | 0 |
| Chicago | 4 | – | 1 | – | 1 | 4 | – | 1 | – | 2 |
| Illinois | 3 | – | 1 | – | 0 | 5 | – | 2 | – | 0 |
| Wisconsin | 2 | – | 1 | – | 1 | 3 | – | 1 | – | 1 |
| Indiana | 1 | – | 3 | – | 0 | 4 | – | 3 | – | 0 |
| Northwestern | 1 | – | 3 | – | 0 | 1 | – | 3 | – | 1 |
| Iowa | 0 | – | 1 | – | 0 | 2 | – | 4 | – | 1 |
| Purdue | 0 | – | 4 | – | 0 | 2 | – | 5 | – | 0 |
$ – Conference champion

The 1909 Iowa Hawkeyes football team was an American football team that represented the State University of Iowa ("S.U.I."), now commonly known as the University of Iowa, as a member of both the Missouri Valley Conference (MVC) and the Western Conference during the 1909 college football season. In their first year under head coach John G. Griffith, the Hawkeyes compiled a 2–4–1 record. They were 1–3–1 in MVC games to finish in fourth place. In the Western Conference, the Hawkeyes played only one conference game, losing to rival Minnesota by a 41–0 score.

Tackle H.R. "Raymond" Gross was the team captain. In 1909, Archie Alexander became the second African-American to play football at Iowa. (Frank Kinney Holbrook was the first.)

The team played its home games at Iowa Field in Iowa City, Iowa.

== Schedule ==
| Date | Opponent | Site | Result | Attendance | Source |
|---|---|---|---|---|---|
| October 2 | at Minnesota | Northrop Field; Minneapolis, MN (rivalry) | L 0–41 | 6,000 | |
| October 9 | Cornell (IA)* | Iowa Field; Iowa City, IA | W 3–0 | | |
| October 23 | at Nebraska | Nebraska Field; Lincoln, NE (rivalry) | T 6–6 | | |
| October 30 | Missouri | Iowa Field; Iowa City, IA | L 12–13 | | |
| November 6 | at Drake | Haskins Field; Des Moines, IA | L 14–17 | 5,000 | |
| November 13 | Iowa State | Iowa Field; Iowa City, IA (rivalry) | W 16–0 | | |
| November 20 | at Kansas | McCook Field; Lawrence, KS | L 7–20 | | |
*Non-conference game

== Players ==
- Archie Alexander, tackle
- Charles Bell, guard
- Benjamin Collins, halfback
- Walter Dyer, halfback
- James Ehret, tackle/guard
- Joseph Fee, quarterback
- H.R. "Raymond" Gross, tackle and captain
- Thomas Hanlon, end
- Henry Hanson, guard
- Charles "Peck" Hazard, fullback
- Mike Hyland, end
- Walter Kresensky, end
- James Murphy Sr., halfback/fullback
- Willis O'Brien, center
- Walter Stewart, quarterback
