= 1909 Kansas State Aggies football team =

American college football season

1909 Kansas State Aggies football

KCAC champion
- Conference: Kansas Collegiate Athletic Conference
- Record: 7–2 ( KCAC)
- Head coach: Mike Ahearn (5th season)

The 1909 Kansas State Aggies football team represented Kansas State Agricultural College (now Kansas State University) in the 1909 college football season. In their fifth year under head coach Mike Ahearn, the Aggies compiled a 7–2 record, and outscored their opponents by a combined total of 320 to 11.

== Schedule ==
Date	Opponent	Site	Result	Attendance	Source
October 2	Kansas Wesleyan	Manhattan, KS	W 35–0		
October 9	at Missouri	Rollins Field; Columbia, MO	L 0–3		
October 16	Kansas	Manhattan, KS (rivalry)	L 3–5	3,500	
October 23	Southwestern (KS)	Manhattan, KS	W 60–0		
October 30	at Kansas State Normal	Emporia, KS	W 44–0		
November 6	at Creighton	Manhattan, KS	W 58–3		
November 13	Oklahoma A&M	Manhattan, KS	W 9–0		
November 20	Fairmount	Manhattan, KS	W 71–0		
November 25	at Washburn	Topeka, KS	W 40–0		
