= 1909 Nebraska Cornhuskers football team =

American college football season

1909 Nebraska Cornhuskers football
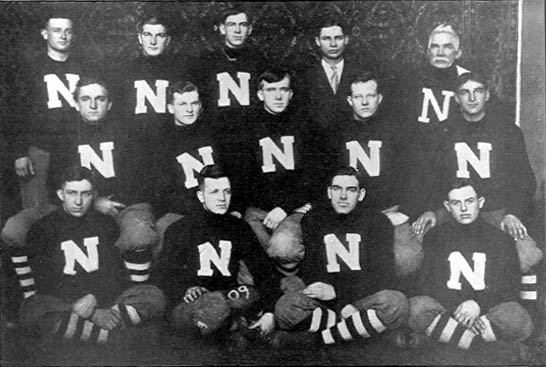
- Conference: Missouri Valley Conference
- Record: 3–3–2 (0–1 MVC)
- Head coach: William C. "King" Cole (3rd season)
- Home stadium: Antelope Park; Nebraska Field

1909 Missouri Valley Conference football standings
	Conf.					Overall
Team	W		L		T	W		L		T
Missouri $	4	–	0	–	1	7	–	0	–	1
Kansas	3	–	1	–	0	8	–	1	–	0
Drake	2	–	1	–	0	6	–	1	–	0
Iowa	1	–	3	–	1	2	–	4	–	1
Iowa State	0	–	2	–	1	4	–	3	–	1
Nebraska	0	–	1	–	0	3	–	3	–	2
Washington University	0	–	2	–	0	3	–	4	–	0
$ – Conference champion

The 1909 Nebraska Cornhuskers football team represented the University of Nebraska as a member of the Missouri Valley Conference (MVC) during the 1909 college football season. The team was coached by third-year head coach William C. "King" Cole and played its home games at Antelope Park and Nebraska Field in Lincoln, Nebraska.

During the season the university finished construction of Nebraska Field, located on campus adjacent to where Memorial Stadium was later built. It replaced Antelope Field, where NU had played its home games from 1897 through 1907. Nebraska played its first two games at Antelope Park (a separate venue from Antelope Field) prior to the new stadium's completion.

== Schedule ==
Date	Time	Opponent	Site	Result	Source
October 2		South Dakota*	Antelope Park; Lincoln, NE	T 6–6	
October 9		Knox*	Antelope Park; Lincoln, NE	W 34–0	
October 16	3:00 p.m.	vs. Minnesota*	Vinton Street Park; Omaha, NE (rivalry)	L 0–13	
October 23	3:00 p.m.	Iowa*	Nebraska Field; Lincoln, NE (rivalry)	T 6–6	
October 30		Doane*	Nebraska Field; Lincoln, NE	W 12–0	
November 6		Kansas	Nebraska Field; Lincoln, NE (rivalry)	L 0–6	
November 20		at Denver*	Denver, CO	W 6–5	
November 25		Haskell*	Nebraska Field; Lincoln, NE	L 5–16	
*Non-conference game

== Coaching staff ==
Coach	Position	First year	Alma mater
William C. "King" Cole	Head coach	1907	Marietta
Jack Best	Trainer	1890	Nebraska

== Roster ==
Beltzer, Oren HB
Bentley, Orlando QB
Chauner, Walter E
Collins, Sydney C
Dobson PLAYER
Elliott, E.B. G
Ewing, Henry RG
Frank, Owen HB
Harte, Louis LT
Hascoll, Vincent QB
Johnson, Frank E
Lofgren, Gus E
Magor, Louis E
McDonald HB
Rathbone, Harvey FB
Schauner E
Shonka, Sylvester C
Spellmeyer RT
Sturmer, Frederick LT
Sturzenegger, Alfonzo FB
Temple, LeRoy RT
Wendstrand PLAYER
Wenstrand, Ralph RG
Wolcott, O.M. LG

== Game summaries ==
=== South Dakota ===
South Dakota at Nebraska

Team	1	2	Total
South Dakota	6	0	6
Nebraska	0	6	6

- Date: October 2
- Location: Antelope Park, Lincoln, NE

=== Knox ===
Knox at Nebraska

Team	1	2	Total
Knox			0
• Nebraska			34

- Date: October 9
- Location: Antelope Park, Lincoln, NE

This was the final meeting between Knox and Nebraska.

=== Minnesota ===
Minnesota at Nebraska

Team	1	2	Total
• Minnesota	14	0	14
Nebraska	0	0	0

- Date: October 16
- Location: Omaha, NE
- Game start: 3:00 PM CT

After seven consecutive games in Minneapolis, Minnesota and Nebraska faced off in Nebraska for a second time.

=== Iowa ===
Iowa at Nebraska

Team	1	2	Total
Iowa			6
Nebraska			6

- Date: October 23
- Location: Nebraska Field, Lincoln, NE
- Game start: 3:00 PM CT

After two Iowa field goals, Nebraska recovered its own fumble in the end zone, and the game ended in a 6–6 tie.

=== Doane ===
Doane at Nebraska

Team	1	2	Total
Doane			0
• Nebraska			12

- Date: October 30
- Location: Nebraska Field, Lincoln, NE

=== Kansas ===
Kansas at Nebraska

Team	1	2	Total
• Kansas			6
Nebraska			0

- Date: November 6
- Location: Nebraska Field, Lincoln, NE

Two 15-yard Nebraska penalties late in the game led to a game-winning punt return touchdown by Kansas.

=== At Denver ===
Nebraska at Denver

Team	1	2	Total
• Nebraska			6
Denver			5

- Date: November 20
- Location: Denver, CO

Nebraska scored its only touchdown off a muffed Denver kick return, and held on for a 6–5 win.

=== Haskell ===
Nebraska at Haskell

Team	1	2	Total
Nebraska	5	0	5
• Haskell	11	5	16

- Date: November 25
- Location: Nebraska Field, Lincoln, NE

Haskell blocked five Nebraska punts, and rode the favorable field position to a 16–5 victory.
