= 1909 Purdue Boilermakers football team =

American college football season

1909 Purdue Boilermakers football
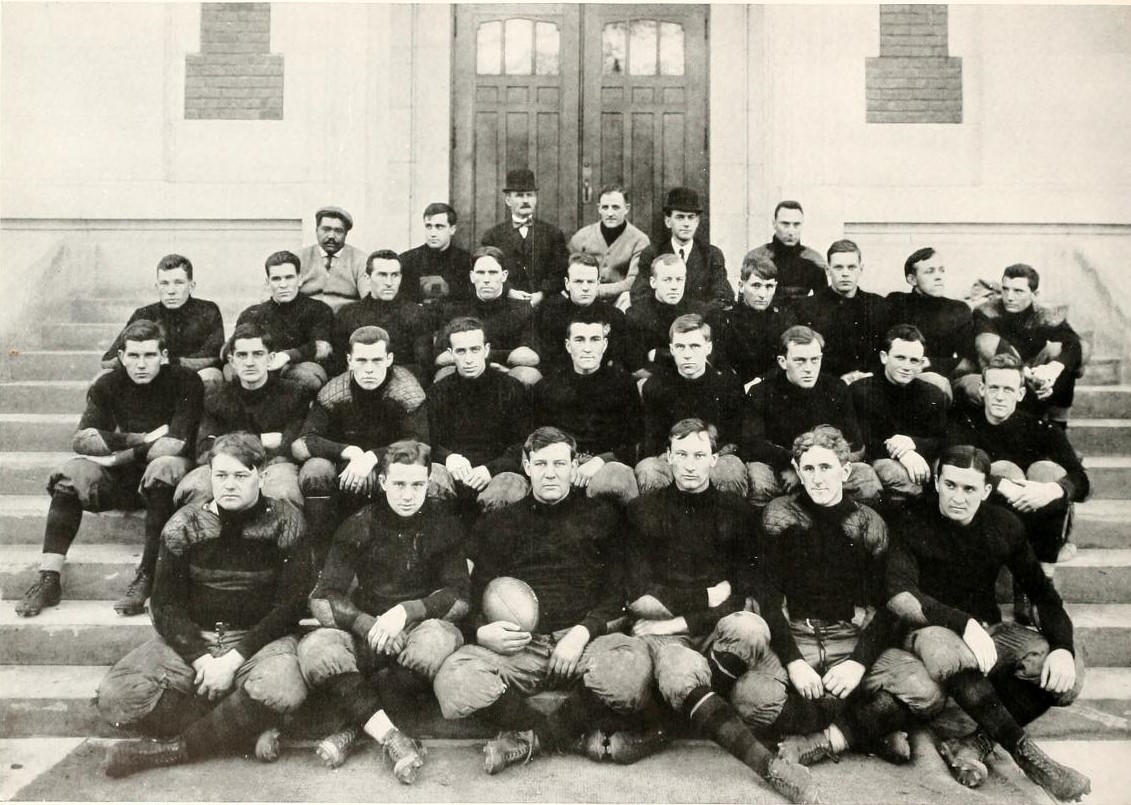
- Conference: Western Conference
- Record: 2–5 (0–4 Western)
- Head coach: Frederick A. Speik (2nd season)
- Captain: F. W. Eggeman
- Home stadium: Stuart Field

1909 Western Conference football standings
	Conf.					Overall
Team	W		L		T	W		L		T
Minnesota $	3	–	0	–	0	6	–	1	–	0
Chicago	4	–	1	–	1	4	–	1	–	2
Illinois	3	–	1	–	0	5	–	2	–	0
Wisconsin	2	–	1	–	1	3	–	1	–	1
Indiana	1	–	3	–	0	4	–	3	–	0
Northwestern	1	–	3	–	0	1	–	3	–	1
Iowa	0	–	1	–	0	2	–	4	–	1
Purdue	0	–	4	–	0	2	–	5	–	0
$ – Conference champion

The 1909 Purdue Boilermakers football team was an American football team that represented Purdue University during the 1909 college football season. In their second season under head coach Frederick A. Speik, the Boilermakers compiled a 2–5 record, finished in last place in the Western Conference with an 0–4 record against conference opponents, and were outscored by their opponents by a total of 147 to 72. F. W. Eggeman was the team captain.

== Schedule ==
Date	Opponent	Site	Result	Attendance	Source
October 2	at Chicago	Stagg Field; Chicago, IL (rivalry)	L 0–40		
October 9	Northwestern	Stuart Field; West Lafayette, IN	L 5–14		
October 16	DePauw*	Stuart Field; West Lafayette, IN	W 15–12		
October 30	at Illinois	Illinois Field; Champaign, IL (rivalry)	L 6–24		
November 6	Wabash*	Stuart Field; West Lafayette, IN	L 17–18		
November 13	Rose Polytechnic*	Stuart Field; West Lafayette, IN	W 26–3		
November 20	at Indiana	Jordan Field; Bloomington, IN (Old Oaken Bucket)	L 3–36		
*Non-conference game

== Roster ==
- C. Christiansen, C
- F. W. Eggeman, T
- L. E. Eisensmith, E
- H. J. Fauber, G
- G. H. Fletcher, QB
- C. D. Franks, T
- Louis Geupel, QB
- W. H. Hanna, QB
- Drewry Kassebaum, G
- J. H. Klumpp, E
- Paul Lisher, G
- J. W. McFarland, FB
- Don Miles, E
- W. K. Mitchell, T
- Alan Ogan, FB
- Thaddeus Reese, T
- Herbert Sebold, HB
- R. S. Shade, HB
- E. J. Smith, FB
- W. C. Speak, G
- E. S. Urwitz, HB
