= 1909 Chicago Maroons football team =

American college football season

1909 Chicago Maroons football
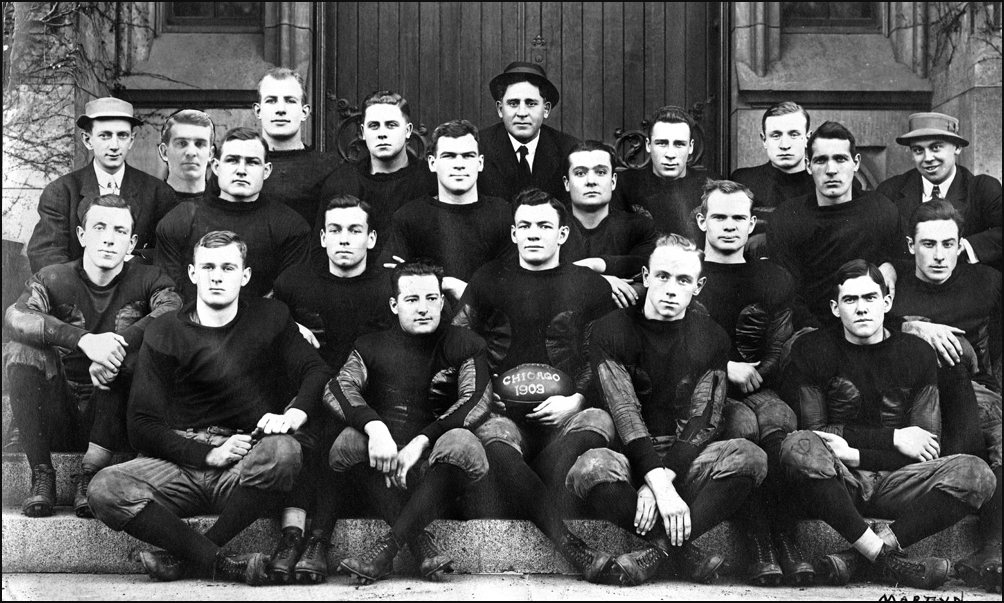
- Conference: Western Conference
- Record: 4–1–2 (4–1–1 Western)
- Head coach: Amos Alonzo Stagg (18th season)
- Captain: Harlan Page
- Home stadium: Marshall Field

1909 Western Conference football standings
	Conf.					Overall
Team	W		L		T	W		L		T
Minnesota $	3	–	0	–	0	6	–	1	–	0
Chicago	4	–	1	–	1	4	–	1	–	2
Illinois	3	–	1	–	0	5	–	2	–	0
Wisconsin	2	–	1	–	1	3	–	1	–	1
Indiana	1	–	3	–	0	4	–	3	–	0
Northwestern	1	–	3	–	0	1	–	3	–	1
Iowa	0	–	1	–	0	2	–	4	–	1
Purdue	0	–	4	–	0	2	–	5	–	0
$ – Conference champion

The 1909 Chicago Maroons football team was an American football team that represented the University of Chicago during the 1909 college football season. In their 18th season under head coach Amos Alonzo Stagg, the Maroons compiled a 4–1–2 record, finished in second place in the Western Conference with a 4–1–1 record against conference opponents, and outscored all opponents by a combined total of 134 to 40.

== Schedule ==
Date	Opponent	Site	Result	Attendance	Source
October 2	Purdue	Marshall Field; Chicago, IL (rivalry)	W 40–0		
October 9	Indiana	Marshall Field; Chicago, IL	W 21–0		
October 16	Illinois	Marshall Field; Chicago, IL	W 14–8		
October 30	at Minnesota	Northrop Field; Minneapolis, MN	L 6–20	26,000	
November 6	Northwestern	Marshall Field; Chicago, IL	W 34–0		
November 13	at Cornell*	Percy Field; Ithaca, NY	T 6–6		
November 20	Wisconsin	Marshall Field; Chicago, IL	T 6–6		
*Non-conference game

== Roster ==
Player	Position	Weight
Harlan Page (captain)	quarterback	152
Benjamin Harrison Badenoch	center	172
William Lucas Crawley	right halfback	176
Herman John Ehrhorn	right end	170
Matthias S. Gerend	left guard	217
Marcus Andrew Hirschl	right guard	171
A. C. Hoffman	left tackle	178
Walter Scott Kassulker	left end	163
Thomas Kelley	right tackle	193
Charlie Rademacher	right guard	194
Rufus Boynton Rogers	left halfback	154
Clark G. Sauer	left end	167
David Edwin Smith	left guard	188
William Joseph Sunderland	right end	132
Oscar William Worthwine	fullback	166
Ira Nelson Davenport	substitute	158
James Menaul	substitute	153
Hume Cliffton Young	substitute	148
Nicolai B. Johnson	trainer

- Head coach: Amos Alonzo Stagg (18th year at Chicago)
