= Nebraska Field =

Former American football stadium in Lincoln, Nebraska, U.S.

Coordinates: 40.8206°N 96.7056°W

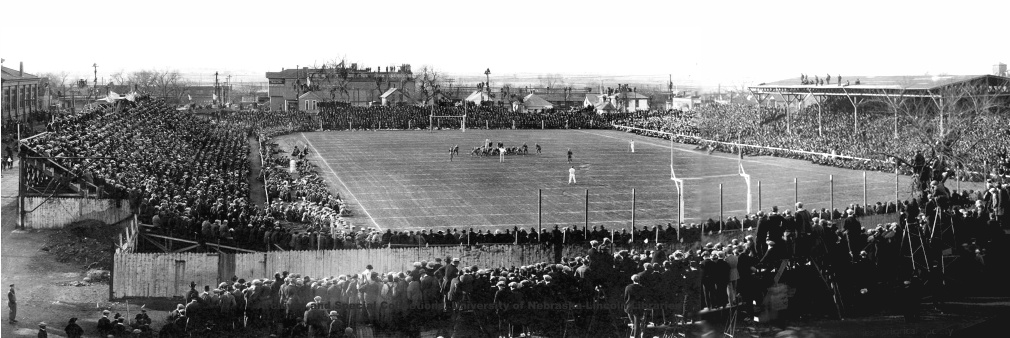
- Panoramic view of Nebraska Field
- Interactive map of Nebraska Field
- Location: N. 10th Street and T Street; Lincoln, Nebraska
- Owner: University of Nebraska
- Operator: University of Nebraska
- Surface: Natural grass
- Record attendance: Est. 16,000 (Nov. 30, 1922)

Construction
- Opened: October 23, 1909; 116 years ago
- Closed: November 30, 1922
- Demolished: 1923

Tenant
- Nebraska Cornhuskers football (1909–1922)

Nebraska Field was an American football stadium on the campus of the University of Nebraska in Lincoln, Nebraska, United States. The stadium primarily served as the home venue for the Nebraska Cornhuskers football team and a variety of other university and state activities. Nebraska Field was demolished in 1923 when the university constructed Memorial Stadium on its former site.

== History ==
The first person to put considerable effort into creating a football-only stadium at the University of Nebraska was Earl Eager, the school's first graduate manager of athletics. Eager had played his entire NU career at Antelope Field, which was "either as hard as a pavement or was a sea of mud" and had no seating other than a few wooden benches. Eager's cause was assisted by the university's expansion, which necessitated the construction of academic buildings on Antelope Field. Eager himself prepared much of the land for the new stadium, and upon its completion at the northeast corner of North 10th Street and T Street, Nebraska Field served as NU's primary home venue from 1909 through 1922. The stadium's main seating area was a wooden grandstand on its south sideline with bleachers along both sides. Nebraska Field opened on October 23, 1909, a 6–6 tie between Nebraska and Iowa.

The stadium's exact capacity is unknown, but the largest recorded attendance was an estimated 16,000 against Notre Dame on November 30, 1922, the final game at the stadium. It was the first of only two losses for Notre Dame's famed Four Horsemen; the other came in Lincoln the following season. The stadium's capacity must have been lower than 16,000, as overflow fans would sometimes climb rooftops or scaffolding to get a view of the field if the grandstands were full.

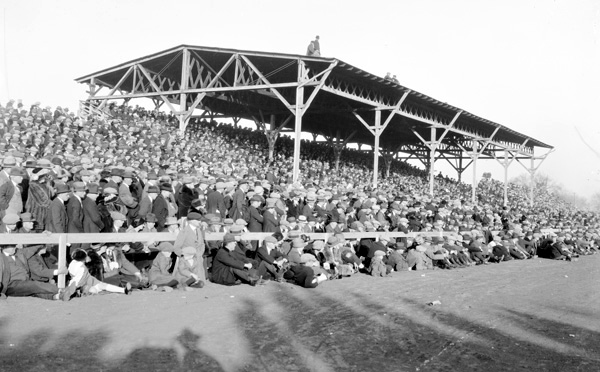
The crowd at Nebraska Field on Nov. 30, 1922, during the last game played at the stadium

The largest margin of victory in Nebraska football history took place at Nebraska Field on November 24, 1910, a 119–0 Cornhuskers victory over Haskell. Following the game, Nebraska head coach William C. "King" Cole resigned to spend time at his Montana ranch. NU's greatest stretch of success at Nebraska Field came under the direction of Cole's successor, Ewald O. "Jumbo" Stiehm. The fiery Stiehm was subject to such frequent outbursts that the school established a women's sitting section at Nebraska Field far from the home sideline. However, his "Stiehm Roller" teams were highly successful, particularly at home: his lifetime record at the stadium was 37–0–2. It was during this streak that Guy Chamberlin became the first All-American in school history.

By 1915, there was considerable momentum toward a steel-and-concrete football stadium for NU, due to both the program's success and the already-deteriorating state of Nebraska Field. Stiehm's departure temporarily slowed this momentum, but by the early 1920s, with "the present athletic field as inadequate now as the old one was in 1907," the university began plans to build a new stadium. The final game at Nebraska Field was a 14–6 victory over Notre Dame on November 30, 1922, also the last home game attended by Nebraska's longtime trainer Jack Best, who had served since the program's inception in 1890. Nebraska's all-time record at Nebraska Field was 60–10–4. Nebraska Field was torn down in early 1923 and the university constructed Memorial Stadium on the site. The portion of North 10th Street passing Memorial Stadium was renamed Stadium Drive in the years following construction. The playing surface at Nebraska Field was aligned east-to-west, while Memorial Stadium is aligned north-to-south.
